= 2010 Mimaropa local elections =

Local elections were held in Mimaropa on May 10, 2010, as part of the 2010 Philippine general election.

== Marinduque ==
=== Governor ===
Incumbent governor Jose Antonio Carrion of Lakas–Kampi–CMD ran for re-election to a second term, but was defeated by representative Carmencita Reyes of Bigkis Pinoy.

Candidate	Party	Votes	%
Carmencita Reyes	Bigkis Pinoy	40,639	41.54
Jose Antonio Carrion	Lakas–Kampi–CMD	28,548	29.18
Wilfredo Red	Independent	27,799	28.41
Narcisso Daquioag	Independent	849	0.87
Total		97,835	100.00
Valid votes		97,835	94.06
Invalid/blank votes		6,178	5.94
Total votes		104,013	100.00
Bigkis Pinoy gain from Lakas–Kampi–CMD			
Source: Commission on Elections

=== Vice Governor ===
Incumbent Vice Governor Tomas Pizarro of the Nacionalista Party ran for re-election to a second term, but was defeated by Antonio Uy Jr. of the Liberal Party.

Candidate	Party	Votes	%
Antonio Uy Jr.	Liberal Party	47,345	51.75
Jaime Jasper Lim	Lakas–Kampi–CMD	30,845	33.72
Tomas Pizarro	Nacionalista Party	13,297	14.53
Total		91,487	100.00
Valid votes		91,487	87.96
Invalid/blank votes		12,526	12.04
Total votes		104,013	100.00
Liberal Party gain from Nacionalista Party			
Source: Commission on Elections

=== Provincial Board ===
The Marinduque Provincial Board is composed of 11 board members, 8 of whom are elected.

Party	Votes	%	Seats
Liberal Party	104,242	37.97	5
Lakas–Kampi–CMD	62,339	22.71	1
Nacionalista Party	18,472	6.73	0
Independent	89,484	32.59	2
Total	274,537	100.00	8
Total votes	104,013	–	
Source: Commission on Elections

==== 1st district ====
Candidate	Party	Votes	%
Melecio Go	Independent	21,149	14.61
Allan Nepomuceno	Liberal Party	21,130	14.59
Mark Anthony Seño	Liberal Party	16,424	11.34
George Aliño	Independent	15,879	10.97
Leticia Monte	Independent	15,852	10.95
Florante Saet	Liberal Party	13,959	9.64
Roberto Narito	Nacionalista Party	10,784	7.45
Rolando Larracas	Independent	10,629	7.34
Henry Evia	Lakas–Kampi–CMD	10,274	7.10
Ramoncito Morales	Independent	7,729	5.34
Mark Joseph de Leon	Independent	970	0.67
Total		144,779	100.00
Total votes		54,492	–
Source: Commission on Elections

==== 2nd district ====
Candidate	Party	Votes	%
Amelia Aguirre	Lakas–Kampi–CMD	18,212	14.04
Harold Red	Liberal Party	15,231	11.74
Eleuterio Raza Jr.	Liberal Party	14,693	11.32
Epifania Rosas	Liberal Party	12,888	9.93
Ildefonso de los Santos	Lakas–Kampi–CMD	12,483	9.62
Aristeo Lecaroz	Independent	12,426	9.58
Yolando Querubin	Lakas–Kampi–CMD	11,610	8.95
Ramfel Preclaro	Liberal Party	9,917	7.64
Cesaria Zoleta	Lakas–Kampi–CMD	9,760	7.52
Juan Carlos Pizarro	Nacionalista Party	7,688	5.92
Manuel Rejano	Independent	4,850	3.74
Total		129,758	100.00
Total votes		49,521	–
Source: Commission on Elections

== Occidental Mindoro ==
=== Governor ===
Incumbent governor Josephine Sato of the Nationalist People's Coalition won re-election to a third term.

Candidate	Party	Votes	%
Josephine Sato	Nationalist People's Coalition	109,366	68.15
Ronilo Omanio	Lakas–Kampi–CMD	49,021	30.55
Regalado Dimayacyac	Philippine Green Republican Party	2,084	1.30
Total		160,471	100.00
Valid votes		160,471	93.13
Invalid/blank votes		11,842	6.87
Total votes		172,313	100.00
Nationalist People's Coalition hold			
Source: Commission on Elections

=== Vice Governor ===
Incumbent Vice Governor Mario Gene Mendiola of the Nationalist People's Coalition won re-election.

Candidate	Party	Votes	%
Mario Gene Mendiola	Nationalist People's Coalition	97,717	68.97
Marleo Barrera	Lakas–Kampi–CMD	43,967	31.03
Total		141,684	100.00
Valid votes		141,684	82.22
Invalid/blank votes		30,629	17.78
Total votes		172,313	100.00
Nationalist People's Coalition hold			
Source: Commission on Elections

=== Provincial Board ===
The Occidental Mindoro Provincial Board is composed of 14 board members, 10 of whom are elected.

Party	Votes	%	Seats
Nationalist People's Coalition	257,723	42.91	6
Lakas–Kampi–CMD	217,500	36.21	2
Nacionalista Party	44,036	7.33	1
Liberal Party	39,944	6.65	1
Philippine Green Republican Party	8,171	1.36	0
Independent	33,235	5.53	0
Total	600,609	100.00	10
Total votes	172,313	–	
Source: Commission on Elections

==== 1st district ====
Candidate	Party	Votes	%
Damaso Abeleda II	Nationalist People's Coalition	41,990	13.66
Joel Panaligan	Nationalist People's Coalition	41,910	13.64
Antonio Rebong Jr.	Nationalist People's Coalition	40,598	13.21
Marilou Ignacio	Nationalist People's Coalition	35,240	11.47
Rocky Legaspi	Nationalist People's Coalition	33,565	10.92
Ferdinand Tria	Lakas–Kampi–CMD	32,227	10.49
Jesus Villarosa	Independent	21,024	6.84
Estelito Ignacio Jr.	Lakas–Kampi–CMD	20,698	6.74
Narciso Ebora	Lakas–Kampi–CMD	19,549	6.36
Oscar Catama	Lakas–Kampi–CMD	14,867	4.84
Lorenzo Ocampo Jr.	Lakas–Kampi–CMD	5,646	1.84
Total		307,314	100.00
Total votes		92,239	–
Source: Commission on Elections

==== 2nd district ====
Candidate	Party	Votes	%
Roderick Agas	Liberal Party	39,944	13.62
Ernesto Pablo Jr.	Lakas–Kampi–CMD	38,368	13.08
Nathaniel Cruz	Nationalist People's Coalition	35,707	12.17
Marian Haydee Villaroza	Lakas–Kampi–CMD	33,499	11.42
Ulysses Javier	Nacionalista Party	28,908	9.86
Ernesto Jaravata	Nationalist People's Coalition	28,713	9.79
Nathaniel Garcia	Lakas–Kampi–CMD	23,236	7.92
Mariboy Ysibido	Lakas–Kampi–CMD	20,826	7.10
Oscar Lim	Nacionalista Party	15,128	5.16
Bernabe Macaraig	Lakas–Kampi–CMD	8,584	2.93
Ricardo Pechon	Independent	8,520	2.90
Alexander Mina	Independent	3,691	1.26
Feliciano Estigoy	Philippine Green Republican Party	2,089	0.71
Edwin Beltran	Philippine Green Republican Party	1,802	0.61
Oscar Baren	Philippine Green Republican Party	1,620	0.55
Morillo Martinez	Philippine Green Republican Party	1,600	0.55
Dionisio Conde	Philippine Green Republican Party	1,060	0.36
Total		293,295	100.00
Total votes		80,074	–
Source: Commission on Elections

== Oriental Mindoro ==
=== Governor ===
Incumbent governor Arnan Panaligan of Lakas–Kampi–CMD ran for re-election to a second term, but was defeated by representative Alfonso Umali Jr. of the Liberal Party.

Candidate	Party	Votes	%
Alfonso Umali Jr.	Liberal Party	149,658	50.02
Arnan Panaligan	Lakas–Kampi–CMD	149,537	49.98
Total		299,195	100.00
Valid votes		299,195	93.36
Invalid/blank votes		21,271	6.64
Total votes		320,466	100.00
Liberal Party gain from Lakas–Kampi–CMD			
Source: Commission on Elections

=== Vice Governor ===
Incumbent Vice Governor Maria Estela Felipa Aceron of the Nacionalista Party ran for the House of Representatives in Oriental Mindoro's 1st district. Provincial board member Humerlito Dolor of the Liberal Party won the election.

Candidate	Party	Votes	%
Humerlito Dolor	Liberal Party	160,597	57.38
Rafael Infantado	Lakas–Kampi–CMD	105,371	37.65
Marcos Bacay	Independent	13,902	4.97
Total		279,870	100.00
Valid votes		279,870	87.33
Invalid/blank votes		40,596	12.67
Total votes		320,466	100.00
Liberal Party gain from Nacionalista Party			
Source: Commission on Elections

=== Provincial Board ===
The Oriental Mindoro Provincial Board is composed of 13 board members, 10 of whom are elected.

Party	Votes	%	Seats
Lakas–Kampi–CMD	508,613	49.27	6
Liberal Party	405,942	39.33	3
Nacionalista Party	32,697	3.17	0
Lapiang Manggagawa	3,386	0.33	0
Independent	81,610	7.91	1
Total	1,032,248	100.00	10
Total votes	320,466	–	
Source: Commission on Elections

==== 1st district ====
Candidate	Party	Votes	%
Patrick dela Rosa	Lakas–Kampi–CMD	83,341	14.61
Ryan Arago	Lakas–Kampi–CMD	72,008	12.63
Roberto Concepcion	Lakas–Kampi–CMD	63,205	11.08
Abraham Abas	Lakas–Kampi–CMD	59,055	10.36
Romeo Infantado	Liberal Party	57,611	10.10
Philip Cesar Joson	Liberal Party	49,275	8.64
Michael Malaluan	Lakas–Kampi–CMD	48,592	8.52
Teddy Jose Flores	Liberal Party	45,818	8.03
Antonio Consolacion	Liberal Party	35,005	6.14
Leo Cueto	Liberal Party	32,646	5.72
Maximo Evora	Nacionalista Party	23,726	4.16
Total		570,282	100.00
Total votes		181,432	–
Source: Commission on Elections

==== 2nd district ====
Candidate	Party	Votes	%
Ramil Dimapilis	Liberal Party	61,773	13.37
Ferdinand Thomas Soller	Lakas–Kampi–CMD	49,705	10.76
Flor de Roxas	Independent	49,291	10.67
Corazon Agarap	Liberal Party	48,808	10.57
Martin Buenaventura	Lakas–Kampi–CMD	39,206	8.49
Crispin Bawasanta	Lakas–Kampi–CMD	34,069	7.37
Reynaldo Malaluan	Lakas–Kampi–CMD	32,411	7.02
Dennis Mambil	Independent	32,319	7.00
Lysander Fetizanan	Liberal Party	29,002	6.28
Jocelyn Solabo	Lakas–Kampi–CMD	27,021	5.85
Renato Zosimo Evangelista	Liberal Party	24,997	5.41
Osias Cadacio	Liberal Party	21,007	4.55
Mamerto Guillan	Nacionalista Party	6,994	1.51
Joelito Mendizabal	Lapiang Manggagawa	3,386	0.73
Dennis Velasquez	Nacionalista Party	1,977	0.43
Total		461,966	100.00
Total votes		139,034	–
Source: Commission on Elections

== Palawan ==
=== Governor ===
Term-limited incumbent governor Mario Joel Reyes of Lakas–Kampi–CMD ran for the House of Representatives in Palawan's 2nd district. Representative Abraham Mitra of the Liberal Party won the election.

Candidate	Party	Votes	%
Abraham Mitra	Liberal Party	146,847	52.05
Jose Alvarez	Partidong Pagbabago ng Palawan	131,872	46.74
Richard Lopez	Independent	1,956	0.69
Lezenie Tomori	Philippine Green Republican Party	770	0.27
Mardonio Gamos	Independent	685	0.24
Total		282,130	100.00
Valid votes		282,130	93.51
Invalid/blank votes		19,581	6.49
Total votes		301,711	100.00
Liberal Party gain from Lakas–Kampi–CMD			
Source: ibanangayon.ph

=== Vice Governor ===
Term-limited incumbent Vice Governor David Ponce de Leon of the Liberal Party ran for mayor of Puerto Princesa. Clara Reyes of Lakas–Kampi–CMD, wife of Governor Mario Joel Reyes, won the election.

Candidate	Party	Votes	%
Clara Reyes	Lakas–Kampi–CMD	155,932	59.16
Leoncio Ola	Partidong Pagbabago ng Palawan	107,640	40.84
Total		263,572	100.00
Valid votes		263,572	87.36
Invalid/blank votes		38,139	12.64
Total votes		301,711	100.00
Lakas–Kampi–CMD gain from Liberal Party			
Source: ibanangayon.ph

=== Provincial Board ===
The Palawan Provincial Board is composed of 14 board members, 10 of whom are elected.

Party	Votes	%	Seats
Lakas–Kampi–CMD	372,143	35.87	4
Partidong Pagbabago ng Palawan	356,782	34.39	4
Liberal Party	132,140	12.74	2
Nacionalista Party	36,336	3.50	0
Bangon Pilipinas	16,383	1.58	0
Independent	123,709	11.92	0
Total	1,037,493	100.00	10
Total votes	301,711	–	
Source: ibanangayon.ph

==== 1st district ====
Candidate	Party	Votes	%
Franz Josef Alvarez	Lakas–Kampi–CMD	65,808	12.15
Derrick Pablico	Lakas–Kampi–CMD	58,568	10.81
Gil Acosta	Partidong Pagbabago ng Palawan	56,166	10.37
Winson Arzaga	Liberal Party	52,689	9.73
Roseller Pineda	Lakas–Kampi–CMD	50,347	9.29
Jim Gerald Pe	Lakas–Kampi–CMD	49,048	9.05
Ramon Zabala	Lakas–Kampi–CMD	37,762	6.97
Rouel Caralipio	Independent	30,848	5.69
Solomon Maagad	Partidong Pagbabago ng Palawan	29,678	5.48
Arthur Ventura	Independent	28,862	5.33
David Aurello	Partidong Pagbabago ng Palawan	28,450	5.25
Roberto Dabuit	Partidong Pagbabago ng Palawan	24,331	4.49
Joel Carceler	Partidong Pagbabago ng Palawan	21,309	3.93
Jayce Mark de los Angeles	Independent	4,885	0.90
Edwin Flores	Independent	2,986	0.55
Total		541,737	100.00
Total votes		156,740	–
Source: ibanangayon.ph

==== 2nd district ====
Candidate	Party	Votes	%
Frederick Abueg	Liberal Party	47,809	9.64
Marivic Roxas	Partidong Pagbabago ng Palawan	45,246	9.13
Rolando Bonoan Jr.	Lakas–Kampi–CMD	44,078	8.89
Sunny Batul	Partidong Pagbabago ng Palawan	41,481	8.37
Ernesto Llacuna	Partidong Pagbabago ng Palawan	39,973	8.06
Myrna Lacanilao	Partidong Pagbabago ng Palawan	37,587	7.58
Celsa Adier	Lakas–Kampi–CMD	35,792	7.22
Jan Abiog	Partidong Pagbabago ng Palawan	32,561	6.57
Pamela Garcia	Liberal Party	31,642	6.38
Cipriano Barroma	Lakas–Kampi–CMD	30,740	6.20
Belen Abordo	Nacionalista Party	20,247	4.08
Carlito Leoncio	Independent	16,780	3.38
Nelson Peneyra	Bangon Pilipinas	16,383	3.30
Haron Narrazid	Nacionalista Party	16,089	3.25
Modesto Eduardo Rodriguez	Independent	11,784	2.38
Presentacion Quitain	Independent	11,499	2.32
Arthuro Serna	Independent	8,195	1.65
Rizador Calvo	Independent	4,384	0.88
Jose Terbio	Independent	3,486	0.70
Total		495,756	100.00
Total votes		144,971	–
Source: ibanangayon.ph

== Puerto Princesa ==
=== Mayor ===
Incumbent mayor Edward Hagedorn of the Nationalist People's Coalition won re-election to a third term against Palawan vice governor David Ponce de Leon of the Liberal Party, former Criminal Investigation and Detection Group director Eduardo Matillano of the Sulong Palawan Party, and Hagedorn's wife Maria Elena Hagedorn, an independent candidate.

=== Vice mayor ===
Incumbent vice mayor Lucilo Bayron of the Nationalist People's Coalition won re-election to a third term against former vice mayor Ceferino Dimalanta, an independent, and former city councilor Gerardo Abordo of the Sulong Palawan Party.

=== City council ===
The Puerto Princesa City Council is composed of 13 city councilors, 10 of whom are elected.

The following candidates were elected as city councilors.

- Luis Marcaida III (Independent)
- Gregorio Austria (Independent)
- Mark David Hagedorn (Independent)
- Jimmy Carbonell (Independent)
- Vicky de Guzman (Liberal Party)
- Rafaelita Oliveros (Independent)
- Modesto Rodriguez II (Independent)
- Miguel Cuaderno IV (Independent)
- Henry Gadiano (Independent)
- Eleutherius Edualino (Independent)

The following also ran as candidates in the city council election.

- Fortunato Almasco Jr. (Independent)
- Trisha Mae Asuncion (Independent)
- Letecia Batul (Sulong Palawan Party)
- Sabino Camacho (Independent)
- Ben Carlos (Independent)
- Joselito Cruz (Independent)
- Francisco delos Reyes (Bangon Pilipinas)
- Nestor Diaz (Sulong Palawan Party)
- Trinidad Ganzon (Independent)
- Edmond Gastanes (Sulong Palawan Party)
- Rustico Hitosis (Independent)
- Geraldine Ibañez (Sulong Palawan Party)
- Marivic Javarez (Independent)
- Victor Josol (Sulong Palawan Party)
- Edmundo Katon (Independent)
- Ester Anastacia Manila (Independent)
- Peter Maristela (Sulong Palawan Party)
- Edgar Allan Naraga (Nacionalista Party)
- Joaquin Palanca Jr. (Independent)
- Alan Pe (Independent)
- Daniel Pedoy (Sulong Palawan Party)
- Marvin Ramos (Sulong Palawan Party)
- Mil Reynoso (Liberal Party)
- Wilfredo Setiota (Nacionalista Party)
- Jessie Tabang (Independent)

== Romblon ==
=== Governor ===
Incumbent governor Natalio Beltran III of Lakas–Kampi–CMD ran for re-election to a second term, but was defeated by Eduardo Firmalo of the Liberal Party.

Candidate	Party	Votes	%
Eduardo Firmalo	Liberal Party	63,368	52.04
Natalio Beltran III	Lakas–Kampi–CMD	55,382	45.48
Telesforo Gaan	Independent	3,013	2.47
Total		121,763	100.00
Valid votes		121,763	92.08
Invalid/blank votes		10,476	7.92
Total votes		132,239	100.00
Liberal Party gain from Lakas–Kampi–CMD			
Source: Commission on Elections

=== Vice governor ===
Incumbent vice governor Alicia Fetalvero of the Nationalist People's Coalition (NPC) ran for the House of Representatives in Romblon's lone district. The NPC nominated provincial board member Manuel Madrid, who won the election.

Candidate	Party	Votes	%
Manuel Madrid	Nationalist People's Coalition	55,177	51.91
Rolindo Perez	Nacionalista Party	51,115	48.09
Total		106,292	100.00
Valid votes		106,292	80.38
Invalid/blank votes		25,947	19.62
Total votes		132,239	100.00
Nationalist People's Coalition hold			
Source: Commission on Elections

=== Provincial board ===
The Romblon Provincial Board is composed of 11 board members, 8 of whom are elected.

Party	Votes	%	Seats
Lakas–Kampi–CMD	115,376	33.42	3
Nationalist People's Coalition	109,630	31.75	3
Liberal Party	58,842	17.04	1
Nacionalista Party	48,794	14.13	1
Independent	12,599	3.65	0
Total	345,241	100.00	8
Total votes	132,239	–	
Source: Commission on Elections

==== 1st district ====
Candidate	Party	Votes	%
Samuel Romero	Nacionalista Party	26,553	16.58
Abner Perez	Nationalist People's Coalition	20,264	12.65
Gil Moreno	Lakas–Kampi–CMD	19,928	12.44
Nelson Lim	Lakas–Kampi–CMD	19,636	12.26
Roberto Madera	Nationalist People's Coalition	17,365	10.84
Jorge Ramos	Lakas–Kampi–CMD	17,169	10.72
Rodne Galicha	Liberal Party	14,126	8.82
Ibarra Silverio	Nationalist People's Coalition	12,498	7.80
Harold Feudo	Independent	9,085	5.67
Elmo Panopio	Independent	3,514	2.19
Total		160,138	100.00
Total votes		63,479	–
Source: Commission on Elections

==== 2nd district ====
Candidate	Party	Votes	%
Felix Ylagan	Nationalist People's Coalition	30,550	16.50
Jim Fondevilla	Nationalist People's Coalition	28,953	15.64
Venizar Maravilla	Liberal Party	24,996	13.50
Fred Dorado	Lakas–Kampi–CMD	22,404	12.10
Michael Arevalo	Nacionalista Party	22,241	12.02
Dinah Fradejas	Lakas–Kampi–CMD	21,289	11.50
Benjamin Irao Jr.	Liberal Party	19,720	10.65
Fred Hernandez	Lakas–Kampi–CMD	14,950	8.08
Total		185,103	100.00
Total votes		68,760	–
Source: Commission on Elections
