= Amy Alvarez =

Filipino politician (born 1977)

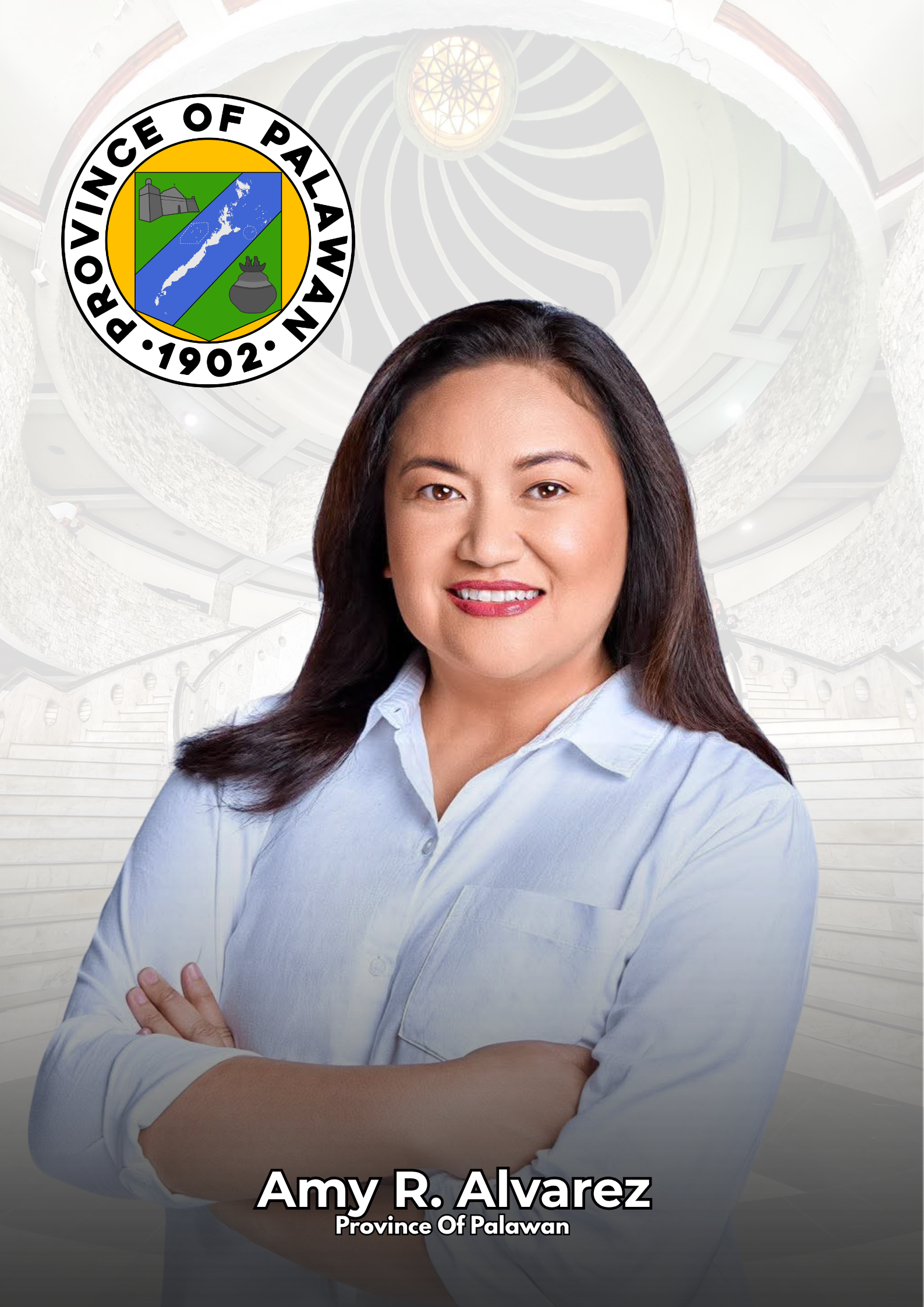
- Alvarez as Governor of Palawan

25th Governor of Palawan
- Incumbent
- Assumed office June 30, 2025
- Vice Governor: Leoncio Ola
- Preceded by: Victorino Dennis Socrates

Mayor of San Vicente, Palawan
- In office June 30, 2019 – June 30, 2025

Personal details
- Born: Amy Roa Alvarez; May 22, 1977 (age 49)
- Party: PPPL (2018–present)
- Parent: Jose Alvarez (father)
- Occupation: Politician

Amy Roa Alvarez (born May 22, 1977) is a Filipino politician who has served as Governor of Palawan since 2025. She ran under the Partidong Pagbabago ng Palawan (PPP), a local party.

She was previously mayor of San Vicente. She is the daughter of Palawan's 2nd district representative Jose Alvarez.

== See also ==
- List of current Philippine governors
- List of female governors in the Philippines
