= Fort Santa Isabel =

Coastal fortification in Taytay, Palawan, Philippines

- Kutang Santa Isabel (Filipino); Fuerza de Santa Isabel (Spanish)
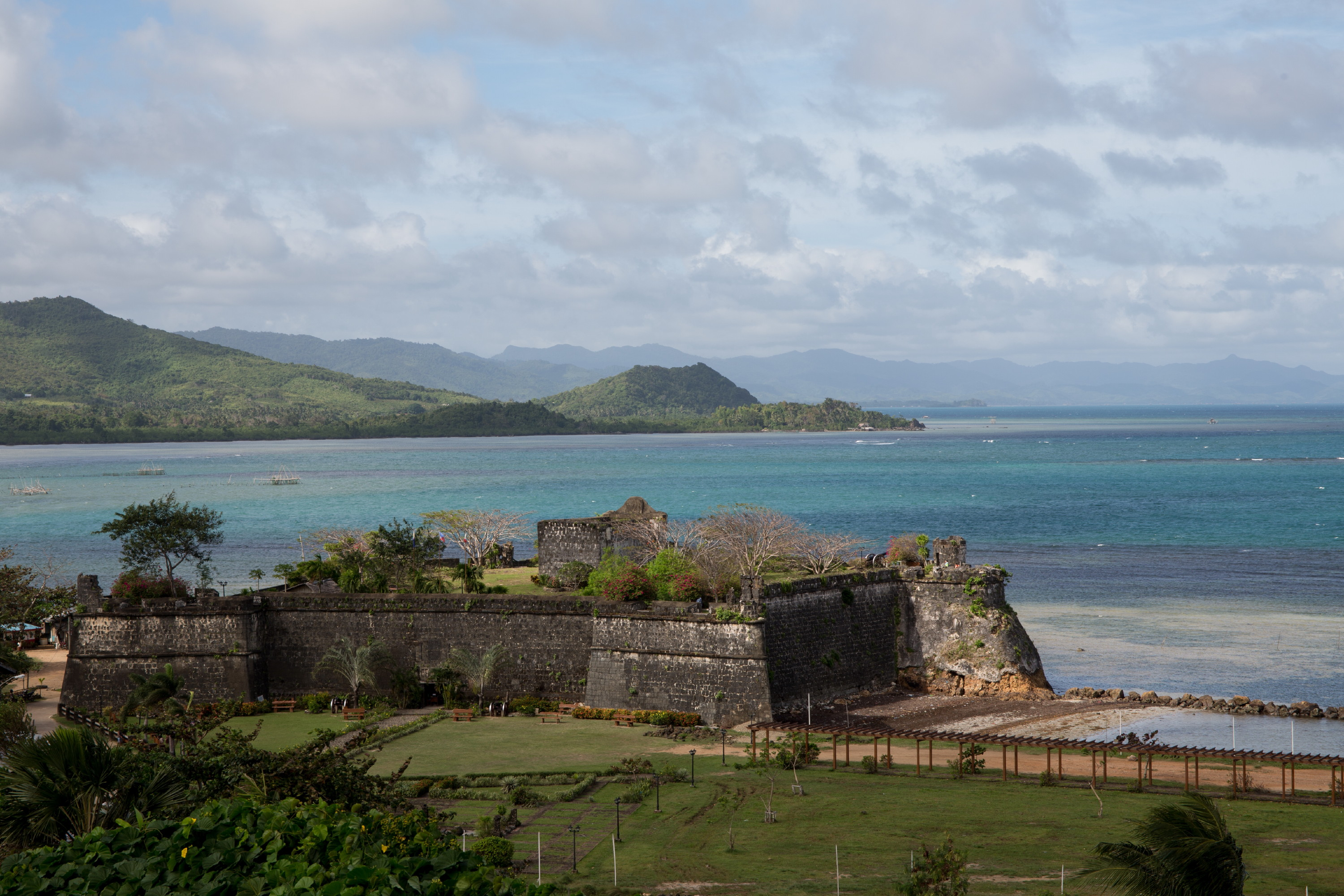

- Location within Palawan
- Alternative names: Taytay Fort

General information
- Location: Taytay, Palawan, Philippines
- Coordinates: 10°49′41.9″N 119°31′3.9″E
- Named for: Isabella II of Spain
- Completed: 1667 (original wooden structure); 1748 (current limestone fort)
- Renovated: 2018–2019

Technical details
- Material: Coral limestone

Renovating team
- Architect: Joel Rico

Fort Santa Isabel (Filipino: Kutang Santa Isabel; Spanish: Fuerza de Santa Isabel), also known as Taytay Fort, is a coastal fortification in the town of Taytay in Palawan, Philippines.

== History ==
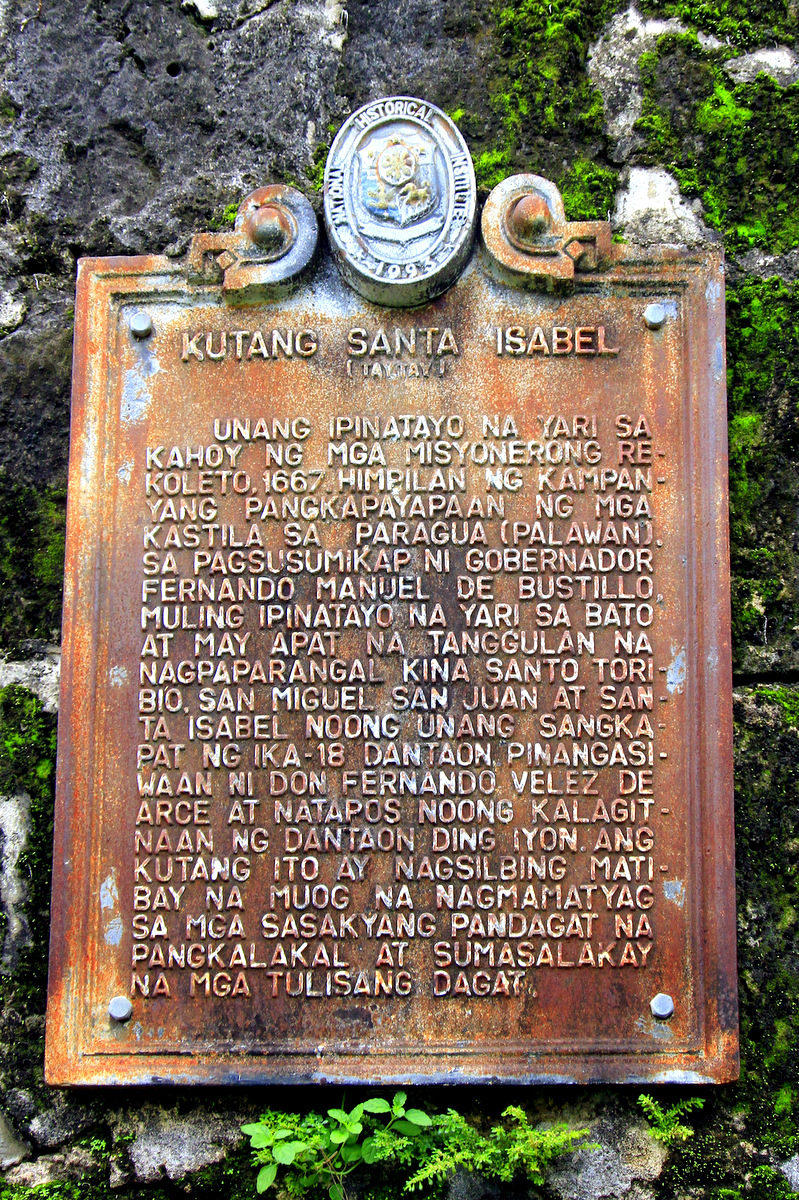
NHCP historical marker

=== Background ===
Fort Santa Isabel was originally built in 1667 as a wooden palisade under the Augustinian Recollect priests. It was named in honor of Isabella II of Spain.

Through the efforts of Governor General Fernando Manuel de Bustillo, the structure was replaced in 1738 by a coral limestone fort and was primarily used by the Spanish as a defensive structure against Muslim raiders.

=== 2018–2019 restoration ===
The municipal government of Taytay, with help from the National Historical Commission, commenced renovation works on the fort in 2018 as part of its Estrella del Norte Heritage Development Project. The project, led by heritage architect Joel Rico, was set to be finished by May 1, 2019.

== Gallery ==
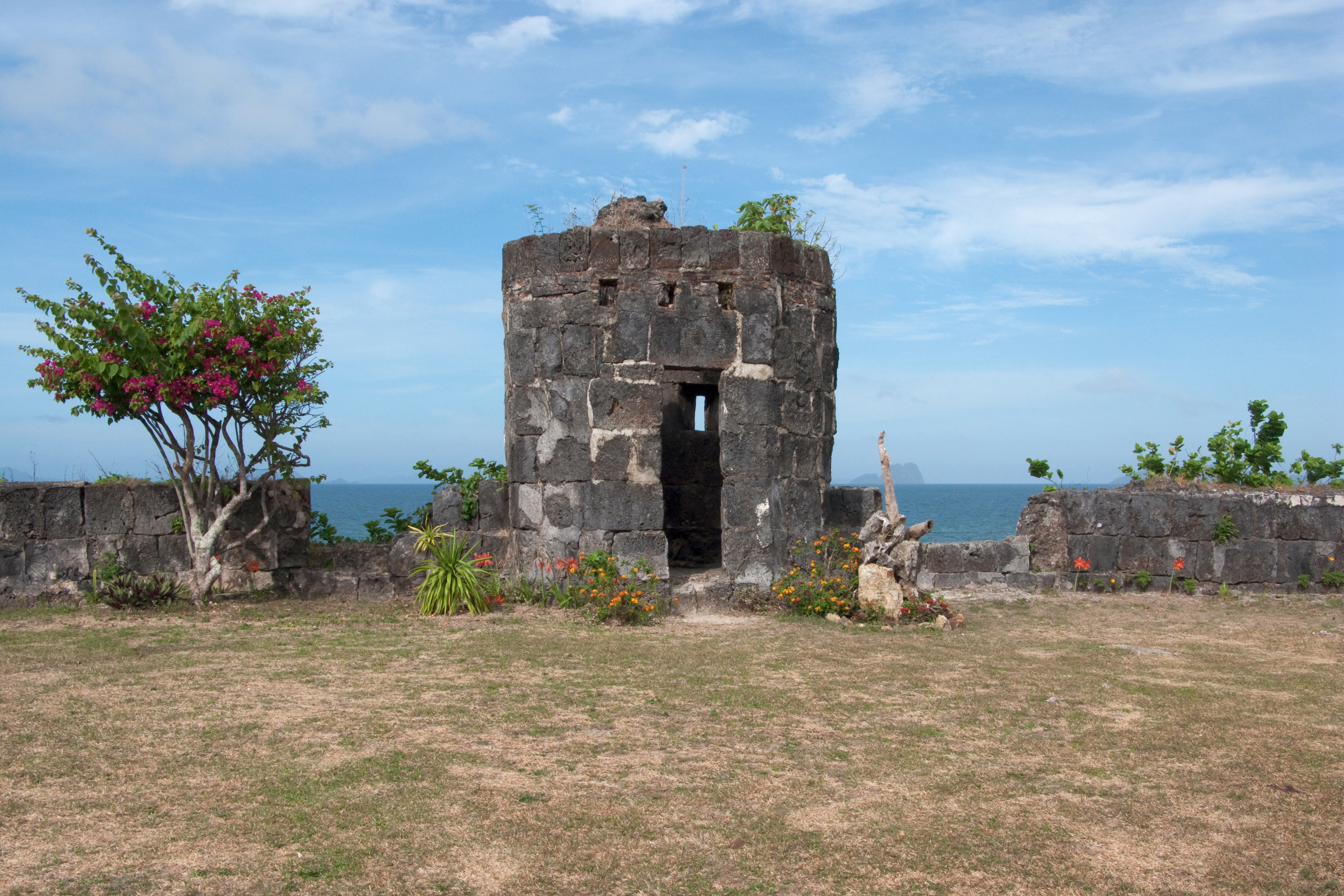
Bastion

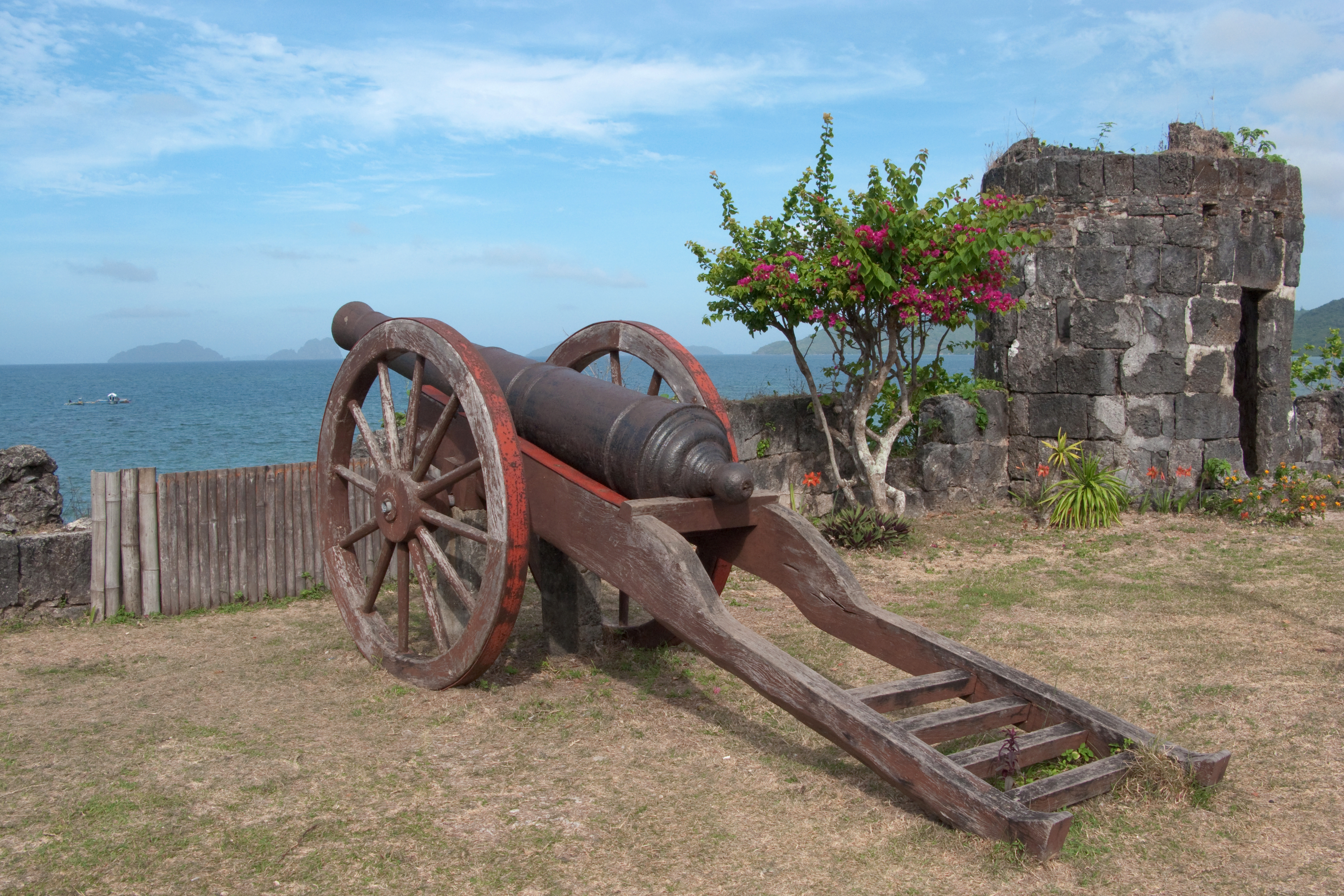
Cannon

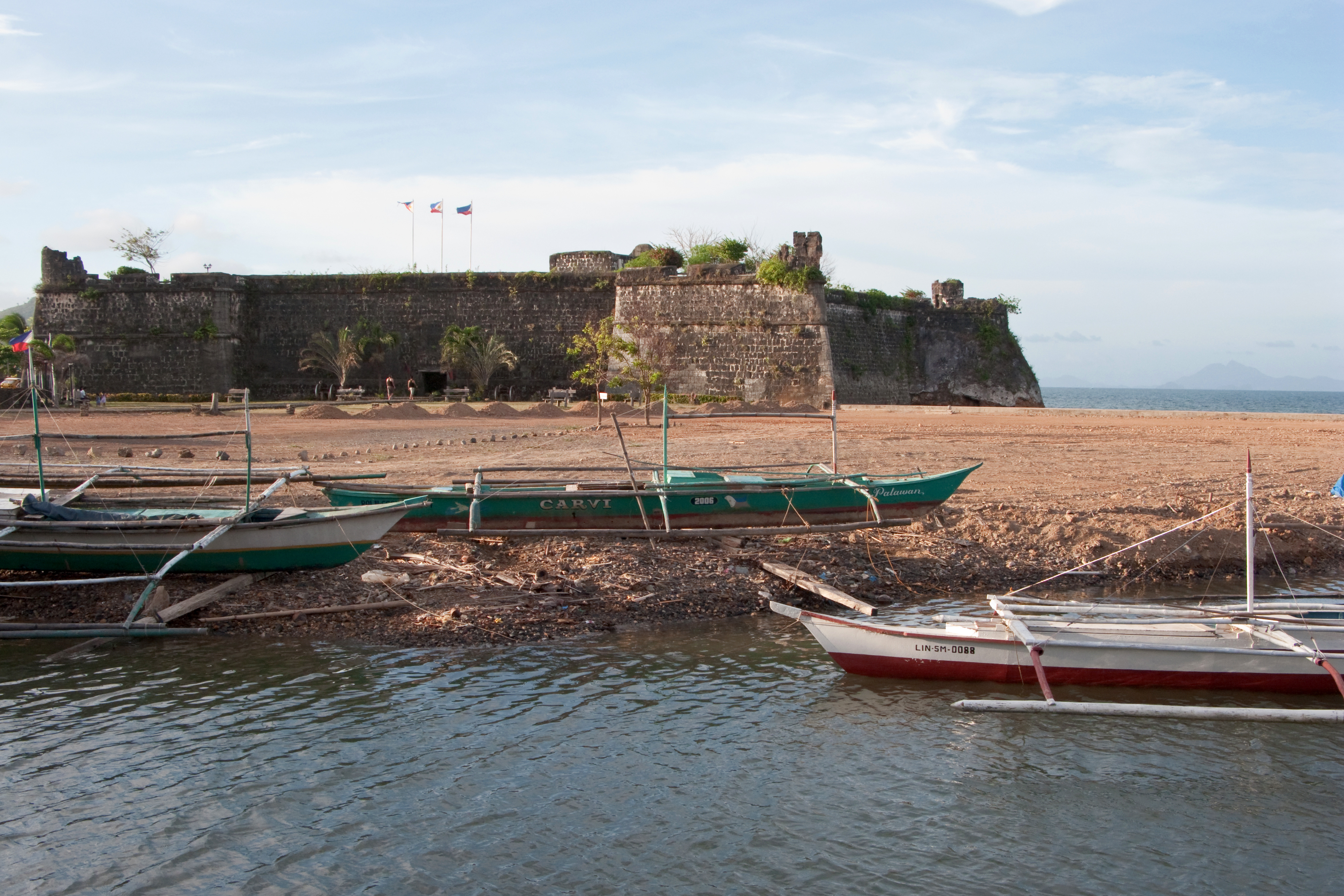
The fort as seen from the coast

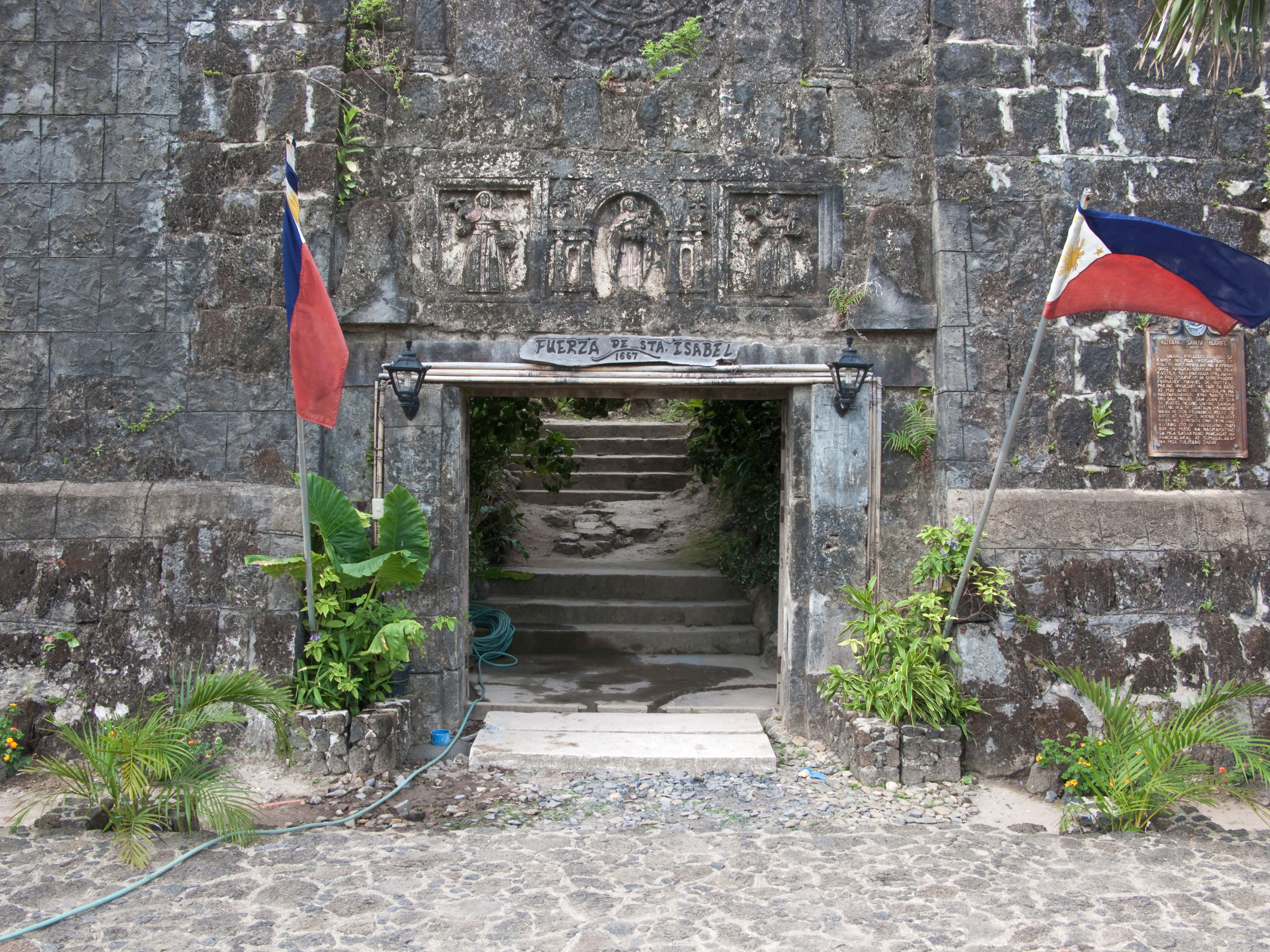
Entrance portal

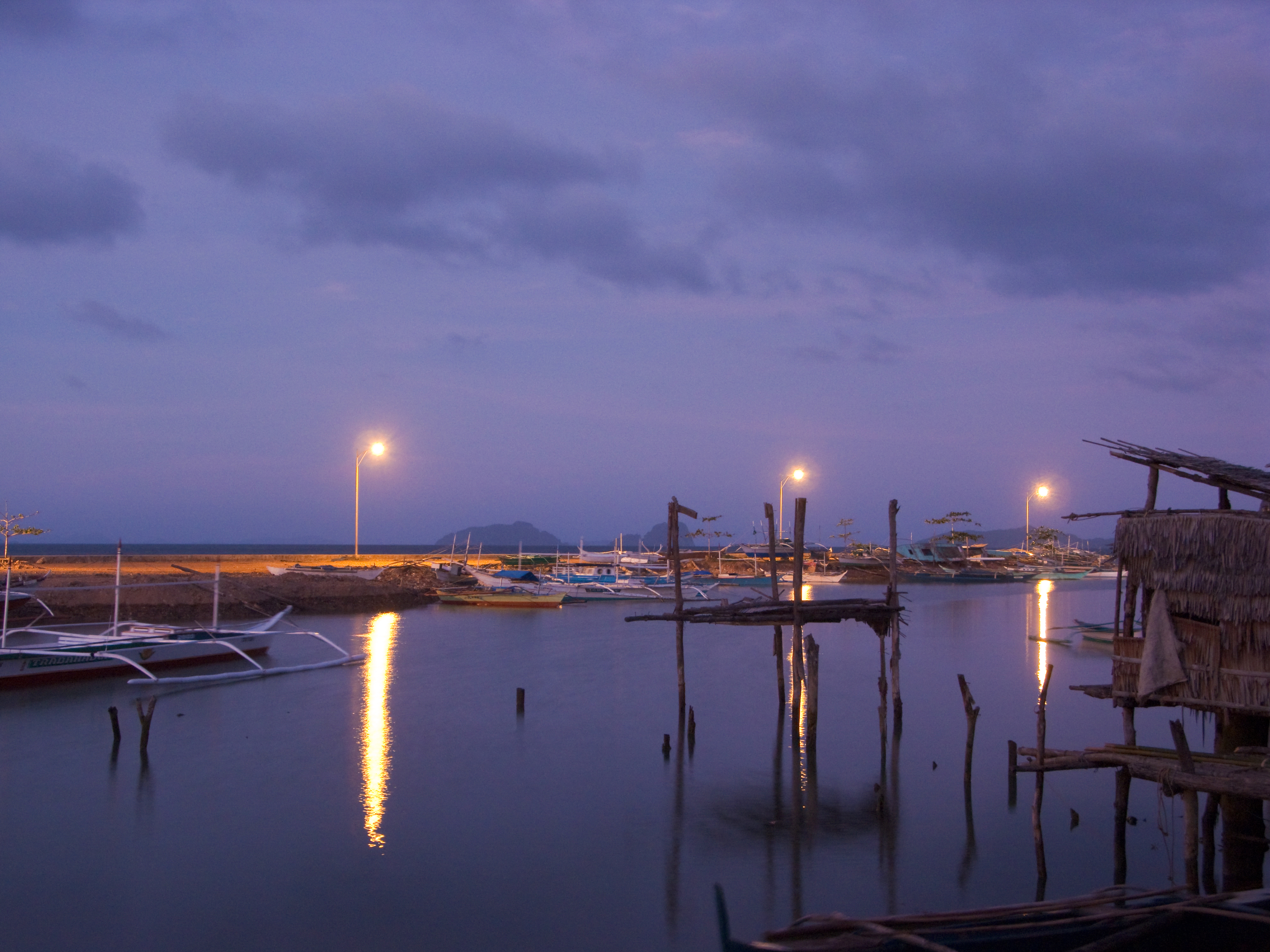
Sulu Sea next to the fort
