= Governor of Palawan =

Local chief executive

- Gobernador ng Lalawigan ng Palawan
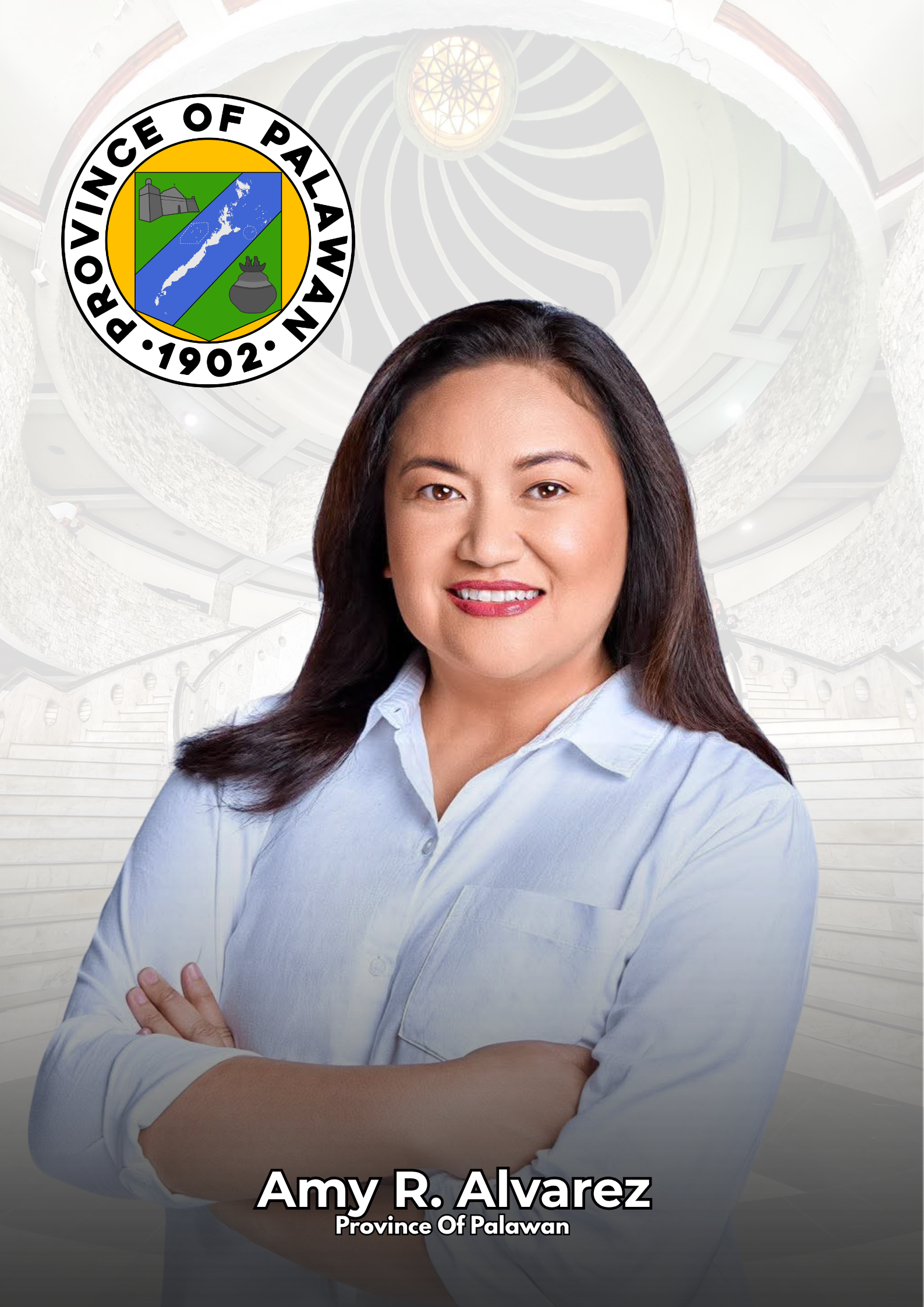
- Incumbent; Amy Alvarez since June 30, 2025
- Style: The Honorable
- Seat: Palawan Provincial Capitol, Puerto Princesa
- Term length: 3 years, renewable maximum not eligible for re-election immediately after three consecutive terms
- Inaugural holder: Antonio Faveau (de facto, appointed governor); Vicente Sandoval (de jure, first elected Filipino Governor of Palawan)
- Formation: June 23, 1902
- Deputy: Vice Governor

The governor of Palawan is the local chief executive and head of the Provincial Government of Palawan in the Philippines. Along with the governors of Marinduque, Occidental Mindoro, Oriental Mindoro, and Romblon, the province's chief executive is a member of the Regional Development Council of the Mimaropa Region.

== History ==
In 1622, Governor General Alonso Fajardo de Entenza and Catholic Bishop Pedro de Arce of the Diocese of Cebu started the colonization of Palawan by sending Augustinian Recollects missionaries, led by Fr. Juan de Santo Tomas to Cuyo and Taytay. Southern Palawan that was still then controlled by the Bruneian Empire. Eventually, a garrison was built in Taytay to support the missionaries.

However, in 1658, Governor-General Sabiniano Manrique de Lara, ordered the removal of the garrison in Calamianes to reinforce the capital, which was then threatened by Chinese raids. Upon the removal of the garrison, a series of Moro raids occurred stealing the islands. Recollects unable to maintain themselves in Calamianes, eventually abandoned it. The Bishop of Cebu put clerics in their place but they were also forced to flee from the threat of Moro pirates.

It was only in 1718 under the administration of the Marshal, Governor-General Fernando Manuel de Bustillo Bustamante y Rueda, the Recollects returned to Calamianes, with the support of rebuilding of the garrison in Taytay, as the capital and the fortifications in various towns. Furthermore, the Recollects asked for another garrison to be set up in Paragua. In order to proceed accordingly, Bustamante sent Antonio Faveau, to Sultan of Borneo to ask the part he owned on the southern portion of Paragua. With no objection to granting it, and Bustamante eventually assigned Faveau as in-change and the new governor of the garrison. The province of Calamianes (now Palawan) was established which is includes the islands of Paragua, Cuyo, Lutaya, Calamianes, and other surrounding islands.

On December 14, 1857, Governor-General Fernándo Norzagaray y Escudero established the naval-military province of Balabac consisting of Agutayan, Bugsuk, Cabuliga, Carandurian (Candaraman), Catagupan (Gugupan), Dalauan (Indalawan), Panaan (Bancalaan), Pasig, Rabor (Labor), Tagagailo, and Singalo (Silom-Silom).

On May 16, 1859, Governor-General Norzagaray ordered the division of province into Calamianes and Paragua. Calamianes includes Cuyo as the capital, Agutaya, Busuanga, Coron, Culion, and Linapacan. While Paragua includes Taytay (as capital) in mainland Paragua, and Dumaran. On March 4, 1872, Puerto Princesa became an independent pueblo from Taytay, and established as the new capital of Paragua.

== List of governors of Palawan ==
Governors of Palawan

1. FIRST PHILIPPINE REPUBLIC (1898–1901)
No.	Image	Name	Term	Origin	Note(s)
1		Esteban Causapin	June 18, 1898 - March 24, 1899	—	Representative of Pres. Emilio Aguinaldo in Calamianes as chief of revolutionary army with seat of government in Taytay. Appointed head of provincial government.
2		Santiago M. Patero	December 1898 - July 1899	Culion	He served as provincial president (governor) of Paragua
3		Hermogenes Constantino	March 24, 1899 - August 31, 1900	Bulacan	Appointed commissioner of Paragua. Later confirmed Governor-delegate to the central government.
4		Rufo Sandoval	September 1, 1900 - July 4, 1901	Culion	Former gobernadorcillo of Culion, appointed governor of Paragua by Gen. Baldomero Aguinaldo.

2. AMERICAN GOVERNORS (1901–1914)
No.	Image	Name	Term	Note(s)
1		John Brown	July 4, 1901 - June 23, 1902	designated Lieutenant Governor of Paragua.
1		John Brown	June 23, 1902 - December 8, 1902	appointed Governor of Paragua, after its official reorganization and defining its boundaries.
2		William Phillips	December 8, 1902 -1903	
3		John Elmick	1903 - 1904	
4		Luke Edward Wright	1904 - 1905	Governor-General of the Philippines
5		Edward Y. Miller	1905 - May 7, 1910	During his time Paragua was changed to Palawan. Longest serving American governor. Died while in office, drowned in Aborlan river.
6		John Henry Evans	May 7, 1910 - 1913	
7		Herbert J. Detrick	1913 - April 6, 1914	Acting governor, returned to US, and later resigned.

3. PHILIPPINE LEGISLATURE (1914–1937)
No.	Image	Name	Term	Origin	Note(s)
1		Ambrosio Pablo	April 6, 1914 - 1916	San Vicente	Former provincial secretary-treasurer. Appointed governor.
2		Francisco Sanz y Perez	1916 - June 30, 1919	Sibuyan	Acting capacity. Former governor of Romblon.
3		Vicente Manlave Sandoval	June 30, 1919 - June 30, 1922	Coron	first elected governor.
4		Anastacio Manalo	June 30, 1922 - June 30, 1925	Puerto Princesa	elected
5		Perfecto Abordo	June 30, 1925 - October 18, 1926	Agutaya	Elected but later found not to have met the minimum residency requirement at the time of election. Governor General Leonard Wood declared office of the governor vacant.
6		Sotero F. Cacdac	October 18, 1926 - March 27, 1927	Taytay	Appointed governor in acting capacity.
7		Rufo San Juan	March 27, 1927 - June 30, 1928	Agutaya	Declared winner in last 1925 election after vote recount.
(4)		Anastacio Manalo	June 30, 1928 - June 30, 1931	Puerto Princesa	On his second term.
8		Higinio Acosta Mendoza Sr.	June 30, 1931 - October 4, 1931	Puerto Princesa	Elected but later vacate the position due to election protest.
9		Eduardo V. Valencia	October 5, 1931 - November 4, 1931	Puerto Princesa	Senior board member. Acting capacity as governor.
(8)		Higinio Acosta Mendoza Sr.	November 5, 1931 - June 30, 1934	Puerto Princesa	Continued the remainder of this first term.
(8)		Higinio Acosta Mendoza Sr.	June 30, 1934 - December 30, 1937	Puerto Princesa	Reelected. Filipino patriot, later executed on January 24, 1944, in Canigaran, Puerto Princesa upon orders of Japanese officials.

4. COMMONWEALTH PERIOD (1937–1946)
No.	Image	Name	Term	Origin	Note(s)
10		Sofronio T. Española	December 30, 1937 - December 30, 1940	Puerto Princesa	Elected.
10		Sofronio T. Española	December 30, 1940 - September 6, 1941	Puerto Princesa	Reelected but later resigned to run in 1941 Congress.
11		Gaudencio E. Abordo	September 6, 1941 - May 18, 1942	Agutaya	Incumbent vice-governor, succeeded Española when the latter ran in Congress.
11		Gaudencio E. Abordo	May 18, 1942 - March 4, 1945	Agutaya	Governor of Free Local Civil Government during Japanese occupation. Capital was transferred to Aborlan.
12		Iñigo Racela Peña	May 18, 1942 - November 25, 1942	Aborlan	Captured by Japanese militia and forced to serve as governor. Former justice of Peace of Aborlan and Congressman.
13		Patricio Fernandez	November 25, 1942 - January 1944	Puerto Princesa	Appointed governor during Japanese Occupation.
14		Amando K. Gaitos	January 1944 - January 1945	—	Appointed governor. Former provincial treasurer.
15		Felix Blanco	January 1945 - March 4, 1945	—	Appointed governor.
(11)		Gaudencio E. Abordo	March 4, 1945 - May 25, 1946	Agutaya	Provincial civil government reinstated. Later resigned to run in Congress.
16		Ramiro Castro	May 25, 1946 - June 6, 1946	—	Appointed governor upon the resignation of Abordo.

5. THIRD PHILIPPINE REPUBLIC (1946–1978)
No.	Image	Name	Term	Origin	Note(s)
17		Alfredo Mendoza Abueg Sr.	June 6, 1946 - December 30, 1947	Brooke's Point	Appointed governor.
17		Alfredo Mendoza Abueg Sr.	December 30, 1947 - December 30, 1951	Brooke's Point	Elected.
(13)		Patricio Fernandez	December 30, 1951 - December 30, 1955	Puerto Princesa	Elected.
(17)		Alfredo Mendoza Abueg Sr.	December 30, 1955 - December 30, 1959	Brooke's Point	Elected on this second term.
18		Telesforo S. Paredes Sr.	December 30, 1955 - December 30, 1959	Puerto Princesa	First governor to be elected in two consecutive terms.
19		Salvador Paredes Socrates	December 30, 1967 - June 30, 1980	Cuyo	Elected in two consecutive terms.

6. FOURTH PHILIPPINE REPUBLIC (1980–1986)
No.	Image	Name	Term	Origin	Note(s)
(19)		Salvador Paredes Socrates	June 30, 1980 - March 15, 1986	Cuyo	Elected but later vacated the office upon the assumption of President Corazon C. Aquino.

7. FIFTH PHILIPPINE REPUBLIC (1986–present)
No.	Image	Name	Term	Origin	Note(s)
20		Victoriano J. Rodriguez	March 16, 1986 - January 31, 1988	Puerto Princesa	Appointed by President Corazon C. Aquino.
20		Victoriano J. Rodriguez	February 1, 1988 - June 30, 1992	Puerto Princesa	Elected
(19)		Salvador Paredes Socrates	June 30, 1992 – July 2, 2000	Cuyo	Elected for 3 consecutive terms. Longest serving governor. Died on a plane crash off the sea of Cagayancillo.
21		Mario Joel Tolentino Reyes	July 3, 2000 -June 30, 2001	Coron	incumbent vice-governor, succeeded Socrates.
21		Mario Joel Tolentino Reyes	June 30, 2001 – June 30, 2010	Coron	Elected for 3 consecutive terms.
22		Abraham Kahlil Blanco Mitra	June 30, 2010 – June 30, 2013	Puerto Princesa	Elected.
23		Jose Chaves Alvarez	June 30, 2013 – June 30, 2022	Kidapawan, resident of Rizal	Elected for 3 consecutive terms.
24		Victorino Dennis M. Socrates	June 30, 2022 – June 30, 2025	Puerto Princesa	
25		Amy Alvarez	June 30, 2025 – present	San Vicente	Incumbent
