= List of female governors in the Philippines =

This is a list of women who have been elected, appointed or acceded as governor of provinces in the Philippines.

Incumbent

== Luzon ==
=== Ilocos Region ===
Name	Portrait	Province	Mandate start	Mandate end	Term length
Carmen Crisologo		Ilocos Sur	1964	1971	7 years
Elizabeth Marcos-Keon		Ilocos Norte	30 December 1971	23 March 1983	11 years, 83 days
Anita Lorenzana		Ilocos Sur	1987	1988	1 year
Imee Marcos		Ilocos Norte	30 June 2010	30 June 2019	9 years, 0 days
Raphaelle Ortega-David		La Union	30 June 2022	30 June 2025	3 years, 0 days
Cecilia Marcos		Ilocos Norte	30 June 2025	Incumbent	1 year, 110 days

=== Cagayan Valley ===
Name	Portrait	Province	Mandate start	Mandate end	Term length
Corazon Espino		Nueva Vizcaya	1962	1962	<1 year
Teresa Dupaya		Cagayan	1964	1979	15 years
Teresa Dupaya		Cagayan	1987	1987	<1 year
Belen Calderon		Nueva Vizcaya	1976	1976	<1 year
Belen Calderon		Nueva Vizcaya	1986	1987	<1 year
Natalia Dumlao		Nueva Vizcaya	1962	1962	<1 year
Aurora Abad		Batanes	18 June 1986	30 November 1987	1 year, 165 days
Ruth Padilla		Nueva Vizcaya	1987	1988	<1 year
Ruth Padilla		Nueva Vizcaya	30 June 2013	30 June 2016	3 years, 0 days
Josie Castillo-Co		Quirino	30 June 1998	30 June 2001	3 years, 0 days
Grace Padaca		Isabela	30 June 2004	30 June 2010	6 years, 0 days
Luisa Lloren Cuaresma		Nueva Vizcaya	30 June 2004	30 June 2013	9 years, 0 days
Marilou Cayco		Batanes	30 June 2016	30 June 2025	9 years, 0 days

=== Cordillera Administrative Region ===
Name	Portrait	Province	Mandate start	Mandate end	Term length
Maria Zita Claustro-Valera		Abra	30 June 1998	30 June 2001	3 years, 0 days
Floydelia Diasen		Kalinga	30 June 2007	30 June 2010	3 years, 0 days
Maria Jocelyn Bernos		Abra	30 June 2016	30 June 2022	6 years, 0 days
Eleanor Bulut Begtang		Apayao	30 June 2019	30 June 2022	3 years, 0 days

=== Central Luzon ===
Name	Portrait	Province	Mandate start	Mandate end	Term length
Juanita Nepomuceno		Pampanga	11 April 1976	13 March 1980	3 years, 337 days
Eunice Guerrero-Cucueco		Aurora	1 February 1988	17 February 1991	3 years, 16 days
Margarita Cojuangco		Tarlac	30 June 1992	30 June 1998	6 years, 0 days
Josefina dela Cruz		Bulacan	30 June 1998	30 June 2007	9 years, 0 days
Ramoncita Ong		Aurora	30 June 2001	30 June 2004	3 years, 0 days
Bellaflor Angara-Castillo		Aurora	30 June 2004	30 June 2013	9 years, 0 days
Lilia Pineda		Pampanga	30 June 2010	30 June 2019	9 years, 0 days
Lilia Pineda		Pampanga	30 June 2025	Incumbent	1 year, 110 days
Czarina Umali		Nueva Ecija	30 June 2016	30 June 2019	3 years, 0 days
Susan Yap		Tarlac	30 June 2016	30 June 2025	9 years, 0 days

=== Metro Manila ===
Name	Portrait	Province	Mandate start	Mandate end	Term length
Imelda Marcos		Metro Manila	27 February 1975	25 February 1986	10 years, 363 days

=== Calabarzon ===
Name	Portrait	Province	Mandate start	Mandate end	Term length
Teresita Lazaro		Laguna	30 January 2001	30 June 2010	9 years, 151 days
Rebecca Ynares		Rizal	30 June 2001	30 June 2004	3 years, 0 days
Rebecca Ynares		Rizal	30 June 2013	30 June 2022	9 years, 0 days
Vilma Santos-Recto		Batangas	30 June 2007	30 June 2016	9 years, 0 days
Vilma Santos-Recto		Batangas	30 June 2025	Incumbent	1 year, 110 days
Angelina Tan		Quezon	30 June 2022	Incumbent	4 years, 110 days
Nina Ynares		Rizal	30 June 2022	Incumbent	4 years, 110 days
Athena Tolentino		Cavite	8 October 2024	30 June 2025	265 days
Sol Aragones		Laguna	30 June 2025	Incumbent	1 year, 110 days

=== Mimaropa ===
Name	Portrait	Province	Mandate start	Mandate end	Term length
Josephine Sato		Occidental Mindoro	30 June 1992	30 June 2001	9 years, 0 days
Josephine Sato		Occidental Mindoro	30 June 2004	30 June 2013	9 years, 0 days
Carmencita Reyes		Marinduque	30 June 1998	30 June 2007	9 years, 0 days
Carmencita Reyes		Marinduque	30 June 2010	7 January 2019	8 years, 191 days
Amy Alvarez		Palawan	30 June 2025	Incumbent	1 year, 110 days
Trina Firmalo-Fabic		Romblon	30 June 2025	Incumbent	1 year, 110 days

=== Bicol Region ===
Name	Portrait	Province	Mandate start	Mandate end	Term length
Paz Cea de Conde		Camarines Sur	1938	1938	<1 year
Rosalie Alberto-Estacio		Catanduanes	30 June 1992	30 June 1995	3 years, 0 days
Elisa Olga Kho		Masbate	30 June 2007	30 June 2010	3 years, 0 days
Sally Ante Lee		Sorsogon	30 June 2007	30 June 2010	3 years, 0 days
Rizalina Seachon-Lanete		Masbate	30 June 2010	25 February 2015	4 years, 240 days
Araceli Wong		Catanduanes	30 June 2013	30 June 2016	3 years, 0 days
Baby Glenda Bongao		Albay	18 October 2024	30 June 2025	255 days

== Visayas ==
=== Western Visayas ===
Name	Portrait	Province	Mandate start	Mandate end	Term length
Encarnacion Fornier		Antique	1963	1967	4 years
Corazon Legaspi-Cabagnot		Aklan	1 February 1988	30 June 1995	7 years, 149 days
Emily Lopez		Guimaras	30 June 1992	30 June 1995	3 years, 0 days
Salvacion Z. Perez		Antique	30 June 2001	30 June 2010	9 years, 0 days
Rhodora Cadiao		Antique	30 June 2016	30 June 2025	9 years, 0 days
Lucille Nava		Guimaras	30 June 2025	Incumbent	1 year, 110 days

=== Central Visayas ===
Name	Portrait	Province	Mandate start	Mandate end	Term length
Gwendolyn Garcia		Cebu	30 June 2004	19 December 2012	8 years, 172 days
Gwendolyn Garcia		Cebu	30 June 2019	30 June 2025	6 years, 0 days
Agnes Magpale		Cebu	19 December 2012	30 June 2013	193 days
Tita Baja		Bohol	17 July 2024	31 July 2024	14 days
Pamela Baricuatro		Cebu	30 June 2025	Incumbent	1 year, 110 days

=== Eastern Visayas ===
Name	Portrait	Province	Mandate start	Mandate end	Term length
Maria Salud Vivero-Parreno		Leyte	1946	1948	2 years
Irene Balite		Northern Samar	30 December 1967	30 December 1971	4 years, 0 days
Salvacion Yñiguez		Southern Leyte	1 January 1968	15 March 1986	18 years, 73 days
Remedios Petilla		Leyte	30 June 1995	30 June 2004	9 years, 0 days
Madeleine Ong		Northern Samar	30 June 1998	30 June 2001	3 years, 0 days
Rosette Lerias		Southern Leyte	30 June 1998	30 June 2007	9 years, 0 days
Clotilde Hilaria Japzon-Salazar		Eastern Samar	30 June 2001	30 June 2004	3 years, 0 days
Milagrosa Tan		Samar	30 June 2001	30 June 2010	9 years, 0 days
Sharee Ann Tan		Samar	30 June 2010	30 June 2019	9 years, 0 days
Sharee Ann Tan		Samar	30 June 2022	Incumbent	4 years, 110 days
Maria Mimietta Bagulaya		Leyte	4 November 2012	30 June 2013	238 days

== Mindanao ==
=== Zamboanga Peninsula ===
Name	Portrait	Province	Mandate start	Mandate end	Term length
Guadalupe Adaza		Zamboanga del Norte	1955	1955	<1 year
Guadalupe Adaza		Zamboanga del Norte	1959	1963	4 years
Aurora Cerilles		Zamboanga del Sur	30 June 2001	30 June 2010	9 years, 0 days
Rosalina Jalosjos		Zamboanga del Norte	30 June 2022	30 June 2025	3 years, 0 days
Dulce Ann Hofer		Zamboanga Sibugay	30 June 2022	Incumbent	4 years, 110 days
Divina Grace Yu		Zamboanga del Sur	30 June 2025	Incumbent	1 year, 110 days

=== Northern Mindanao ===
Name	Portrait	Province	Mandate start	Mandate end	Term length
Ruth de Lara-Guingona		Misamis Oriental	1998	1998	<1 year
Imelda Dimaporo		Lanao del Norte	30 June 1998	30 June 2007	9 years, 0 days
Imelda Dimaporo		Lanao del Norte	30 June 2016	30 June 2025	9 years, 0 days
Herminia Ramiro		Misamis Occidental	30 June 2010	30 June 2019	9 years, 0 days
Maria Luisa Romualdo		Camiguin	30 June 2016	30 June 2019	3 years, 0 days
Juliette Uy		Misamis Oriental	30 June 2025	Incumbent	1 year, 110 days

=== Davao Region ===
Name	Portrait	Province	Mandate start	Mandate end	Term length
Josefina Sibala		Davao Oriental	April 1987	November 1987	7 months
Josefina Sibala		Davao Oriental	12 August 1992	30 June 1992	323 days
Cecilia de la Paz		Davao del Norte	4 January 1988	3 February 1988	30 days
Rosalind Lopez		Davao Oriental	30 June 1992	30 June 2001	9 years, 0 days
Luz Sarmiento		Compostela Valley	27 March 1998	30 June 1998	95 days
Maria Elena Palma Gil		Davao Oriental	30 June 2001	30 June 2007	6 years, 0 days
Corazon Malanyaon		Davao Oriental	30 June 2007	30 June 2016	9 years, 0 days
Corazon Malanyaon		Davao Oriental	30 June 2022	29 June 2023	364 days
Dorothy Gonzaga		Davao de Oro	30 June 2022	30 June 2025	3 years, 0 days
Yvonne Roña Cagas		Davao del Sur	30 June 2022	Incumbent	4 years, 110 days

=== Soccsksargen ===
Name	Portrait	Province	Mandate start	Mandate end	Term length
Rosario Diaz		Cotabato	1986	1987	<1 year
Rosario Diaz		Cotabato	2 February 1988	27 March 1998	10 years, 53 days
Priscilla Chiongbian		Sarangani	30 June 1992	30 June 2001	9 years, 0 days
Rosila Jamison		Sultan Kudarat	26 March 1998	30 June 1998	96 days
Agnes Amador		Cotabato	27 March 1998	30 June 1998	95 days
Daisy Avance Fuentes		South Cotabato	30 June 2001	30 June 2010	9 years, 0 days
Daisy Avance Fuentes		South Cotabato	30 June 2013	30 June 2019	6 years, 0 days
Emmylou Taliño-Mendoza		Cotabato	30 June 2010	30 June 2019	9 years, 0 days
Emmylou Taliño-Mendoza		Cotabato	30 June 2022	Incumbent	4 years, 110 days
Nancy Catamco		Cotabato	30 June 2019	30 June 2022	3 years, 0 days

=== Caraga ===
Name	Portrait	Province	Mandate start	Mandate end	Term length
Adela Serra-Ty		Surigao del Sur			
Consuelo Calo		Agusan	1966	17 June 1967	<1 year
Consuelo Calo		Agusan del Norte	17 June 1967	15 March 1986	18 years, 271 days
Salvacion Cejoco		Surigao del Sur	1 February 1988	30 June 1992	4 years, 150 days
Angelica Amante		Agusan del Norte	30 June 1995	30 June 2004	9 years, 0 days
Angelica Amante		Agusan del Norte	30 June 2013	30 June 2019	6 years, 0 days
Angelica Amante		Agusan del Norte	30 June 2022	Incumbent	4 years, 110 days
Valentina Plaza		Agusan del Sur	30 June 1998	30 June 2001	3 years, 0 days
Maria Valentina Plaza		Agusan del Sur	30 June 2007	30 June 2010	3 years, 0 days
Geraldine Ecleo-Villaroman		Dinagat Islands	30 June 2007	30 June 2010	3 years, 0 days
Glenda Ecleo		Dinagat Islands	30 June 2010	30 June 2019	9 years, 0 days
Sol Matugas		Surigao del Norte	30 June 2010	30 June 2019	9 years, 0 days
Kaka Bag-ao		Dinagat Islands	30 June 2019	30 June 2022	3 years, 0 days

=== Bangsamoro ===
Name	Portrait	Province	Mandate start	Mandate end	Term length
Princess Tarhata Alonto-Lucman		Lanao del Sur	1971	1975	4 years
Jum Jainudin Akbar		Basilan	30 June 2007	30 June 2016	9 years, 0 days
Bai Nariman Ambolodto		Maguindanao	November 2009	30 June 2010	<1 year
Soraya Bedjora Adiong		Lanao del Sur	30 June 2016	30 June 2019	3 years, 0 days
Bai Mariam Mangudadatu		Maguindanao	30 June 2019	13 October 2022	3 years, 105 days
Bai Mariam Mangudadatu		Maguindanao del Sur	13 October 2022	30 June 2025	3 years, 0 days
Bai Ainee Sinsuat		Maguindanao del Norte	13 October 2022	5 April 2023	174 days

== See also ==
- List of current Philippine provincial governors
