= Rufo Sandoval =

Governor of Calamianes y Paragua (1900–1901)

Governor of Calamianes y Paragua
- In office September 1, 1900 – May 24, 1901
- Appointed by: Baldomero Aguinaldo
- President: Emilio Aguinaldo
- Preceded by: Hermogenes Constantino
- Succeeded by: Mariano Trías

Gobernadorcillo of Culion
- In office 1886–1889

Personal details
- Born: Unknown Culion, Calamianes, Captaincy General of the Philippines
- Died: May 24, 1901

Military service
- Allegiance: First Philippine Republic
- Branch/service: Philippine Republican Army
- Years of service: 1898-1901
- Rank: General
- Battles/wars: Philippine Revolution Philippine–American War: Battle of Maytiguid

Rufo Sandoval (? – May 24, 1901) was a Filipino general and politician who served as the third and last Governor of Calamianes y Paragua during the First Philippine Republic. During his tenure, he headed the defense of the revolutionary government in Calamianes and Paragua against American forces during the Philippine-American War before meeting his demise on May 24, 1901.

== Personal life ==
Rufo was part of the prominent Sandoval clan which had its origins in the marriage of Evarista Manlavi of Cuyo and Claudio Sandoval of Jaro in Iloilo. This family eventually relocated to Culion and played a leading role in the development of the region.

== Career ==
Rufo Sandoval served as the Gobernadorcillo of Culion from 1886 to 1889.

In September 1896, as a result of the Philippine Revolution, Spanish authorities became paranoid and placed over 200 men from Calamianes into Balabac. The anti-Spanish authorities garrisoned in Culion were headed by Sandoval.

On June 12, 1898, the Philippines declared its independence from Spanish rule in the later part of the revolution.

In January 1899, after the proclamation of the First Philippine Republic, President Emilio Aguinaldo made several appointments to govern the archipelago. In Calamianes y Paragua (now Palawan), he appointed Hermogenes Constantino to take charge as its new governor. Due to the corruption demonstrated by Constantino, who became a warlord, Sandoval felt the need to rectify the situation and maintain the dignity of the office.

On September 1, 1900, Sandoval was appointed by Secretary of the Interior Baldomero Aguinaldo to replace Hermogenes Constantino as the new Governor of Calamianes y Paragua due to Constantino's corruption and other despicable acts. As the new governor, he became responsible for the defense of the Republic against the American forces and those sympathetic to them, called the “Americanistas”. Sandoval was warmly welcomed everywhere throughout Calamianes y Paragua, except in Cuyo, which eventually became the bastion of American colonialism. Its local head, Clemente Hernandez, along with other aristocrats in the town, were very pro-American and intended to surrender the town to American rule.

On October 4, as part of his anti-corruption campaign, he ordered the arrest of Constantino. Eventually, to secure the revolutionary government in Cuyo, Sandoval assigned Fabian de Leon and Pedro Concepcion as representatives of the new revolutionary government in the town. However, de Leon and Concepcion were eventually outmaneuvered by the local elite who scorned being ruled by the Tagalog leaders. The two were finally banished from Cuyo and failed to regain control of the Cuyonon.

In May 1901, American forces captured Cuyo and neared Taytay. Sandoval remained defiant amidst this looming threat and refused to surrender the town to the American forces. On May 24, Sandoval's naval forces encountered the American gunship Samar at Maytiguid in Taytay, where he lost the battle after being bombarded and fled inland, with most of his forces raising the white flag of surrender. To the Americans’ surprise, the people welcomed their troops. They proceeded to destroy the boats and confiscated the documents of the revolutionary government. Major George LeRoy Brown led the pursuit to Bacuit Island, where he was told that Sandoval had left with 30 men. That was the last sighting of Sandoval who reportedly died not long after due to sickness. On May 29, Puerto Princesa was captured by American forces.

== See also ==
- Philippine Revolution
- Philippine-American War
- First Philippine Republic
- Taytay, Palawan
- Coron, Palawan

Political offices
| Preceded by Hermogenes Constantino | Governor of Calamianes y Paragua; 1900-1901 | Succeeded by Position disestablished |
