= Mario Joel Reyes =

Filipino politician (born 1952)

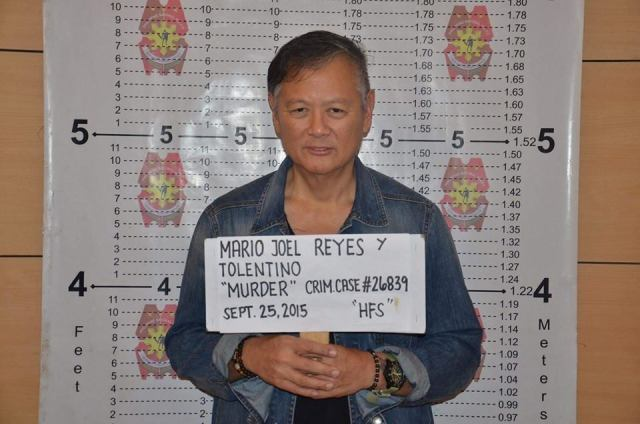
- Reyes mugshot in 2015

21st Governor of Palawan
- In office July 3, 2000 – June 30, 2010
- Vice Governor: David Ponce de Leon
- Preceded by: Salvador Socrates
- Succeeded by: Abraham Mitra

Vice Governor of Palawan
- In office June 30, 1992 – July 2, 2000
- Governor: Salvador Socrates

Personal details
- Born: Mario Joel Tolentino Reyes; October 19, 1952 (age 74) Coron, Palawan, Philippines
- Party: Independent (2015–present)
- Other political affiliations: Lakas (until 2015)

Mario Joel Tolentino Reyes (born October 19, 1952) is a Filipino politician who served as Governor of Palawan.

== Early life and education ==
Reyes was born on October 19, 1952 in Coron, Palawan. He attended the Far Eastern University and pursued a law degree but later dropped out.

Reyes left his hometown after he was linked to the death of a friend, Danilo Salta Cruz, during a hunting trip; which was recorded as an accident by the police. He went to the United States and worked in various odd jobs, primarily as a bartender in Los Angeles.

== Political career ==
=== Early years ===
Then Acting Vice Governor Art Ventura, who was installed to his position in 1986 under the revolutionary government under President Corazon Aquino, was the one that convinced Reyes to get involved in politics by urging him to run for the position of Palawan board member.

In the 1998, he was elected as Palawan vice governor. Around that time he was already protege of House Speaker Ramon Mitra Jr., a rival of then governor Salvador Socrates.

=== Governor of Palawan (2000–2010) ===
Reyes first became the Governor of Palawan when he assumed the position under an acting capacity when Salvador Socrates died in a plane crash on July 2, 2000.

However, Socrates' election in 1998 was subject to an electoral protest. On January 2, 2001 the Commission on Election (Comelec) ruled the deceased Socrates unfit to hold office and declared second placer, Douglas Hagedorn as winner of the election. Consequentially, Comelec ordered Reyes to vacate the governorship. Reyes filed for a temporary restraining order against the move in the Supreme Court.

Reyes ran in the 2001 elections and was elected as governor of Palawan, defeating Edward Hagedorn. In 2004, Reyes was reelected after garnering 141,113 votes over Vicente Sandoval who had 50,500 votes. His whole electoral slate under the Puwersa ng Mamamayang Palaweño also won.

Partnering with the municipal government of Coron led by his younger brother Mayor Mario Reyes Jr., Joel Reyes launched a land reclamation and tourism project, the Coron Waterfront Development Project.

Reyes signed on November 25, 2008 a 25-year moratorium on issuing permits large and small scale mining via Resolution No. 7728-08.

Ineligible to run again, Reyes backed the candidacy of Abraham Mitra for governor in the 2010 election. Mitra won against Jose Alvarez by a slim margin. Alvarez was a critic of Reyes' reclamation project in Coron who alleged that he owed him money from a loan Reyes supposedly took for his 2001 election campaign, which was dismissed by Reyes.

=== 2010 Palawan representative bid ===
Reyes ran for Palawan's 2nd district in the House of Representatives. However, Comelec blocked his bid for failing to meet residency requirements.

=== 2016 Coron mayoral bid ===
Despite his detention in jail, Reyes ran for Mayor of Coron in the 2016 elections. His brother, also detained, was his vice mayoral candidate.

=== 2022 gubernatorial bid ===
Reyes ran again for governor in the 2022 elections. Reyes was able to run despite his graft conviction since he was still appealing the ruling in the Supreme Court. In January 2023, Reyes was disqualified by Comelec despite him already having lost the elections.

== Legal cases ==
=== Killing of Gerry Ortega ===
Mario Joel Reyes along his brother Mario Jr. were implicated in the killing of Palawan environmentalist and journalist Gerry Ortega, who was shot dead by Marlon Recamata on January 24, 2011. Recamata and several other suspects who were arrested named the Reyeses as the mastermind of Ortega's assassination. The Reyeses were indicted by the Department of Justice (DOJ) which called for their arrest. The two fled the Philippines in March 2012. In September 2015, they were arrested in Phuket, Thailand. They were deported back to the Philippines and detained at the Puerto Princesa City Jail.

Reyes was released on January 4, 2018 after the Court of Appeals (CA) cleared him of the murder charges. However, the CA reversed its decision in 2019 and reordered his arrest. In 2023, the Supreme Court ordered for the continuation of the Ortega murder trial and Reyes' re-arrest. In June 2024, the Philippine government offered a P100,000-reward for his capture. On September 11, 2024, Joel Reyes surrendered to the National Bureau of Investigation. In October 2024, Reyes moved for bail and hospital detention with the Quezon City Regional Trial Court anchored on a medical complication.

=== Graft cases ===
In 2017, Reyes was convicted for graft for granting unwarranted benefits to the mining firm Olympic Mines and Development Corp. (OMDC) in the renewal of its small-scale mining permit which was valid from 2006 to 2008, which allowed it to mine beyond the allowable extraction limit. He was sentenced to six to eight years of imprisonment and was perpetually disqualified from public office.

The Sandiganbayan later upheld Reyes' graft conviction and reordered his arrest. Reyes surrendered on January 29, 2018 and was committed back to jail. He was tried on 36 counts of graft in relation to the alleged misuse of the ₱1.53 billion Malampaya funds in 2008. On July 31, 2025, Reyes was convicted over the charges and sentenced to up to 10 years' imprisonment.

== Personal life ==
Reyes hails from the town of Coron in Palawan. He is married to Clara "Fems" Espiritu.
