= Taytay, Palawan =

Municipality in Palawan, Philippines

Taytay
- Municipality
- Municipality of Taytay
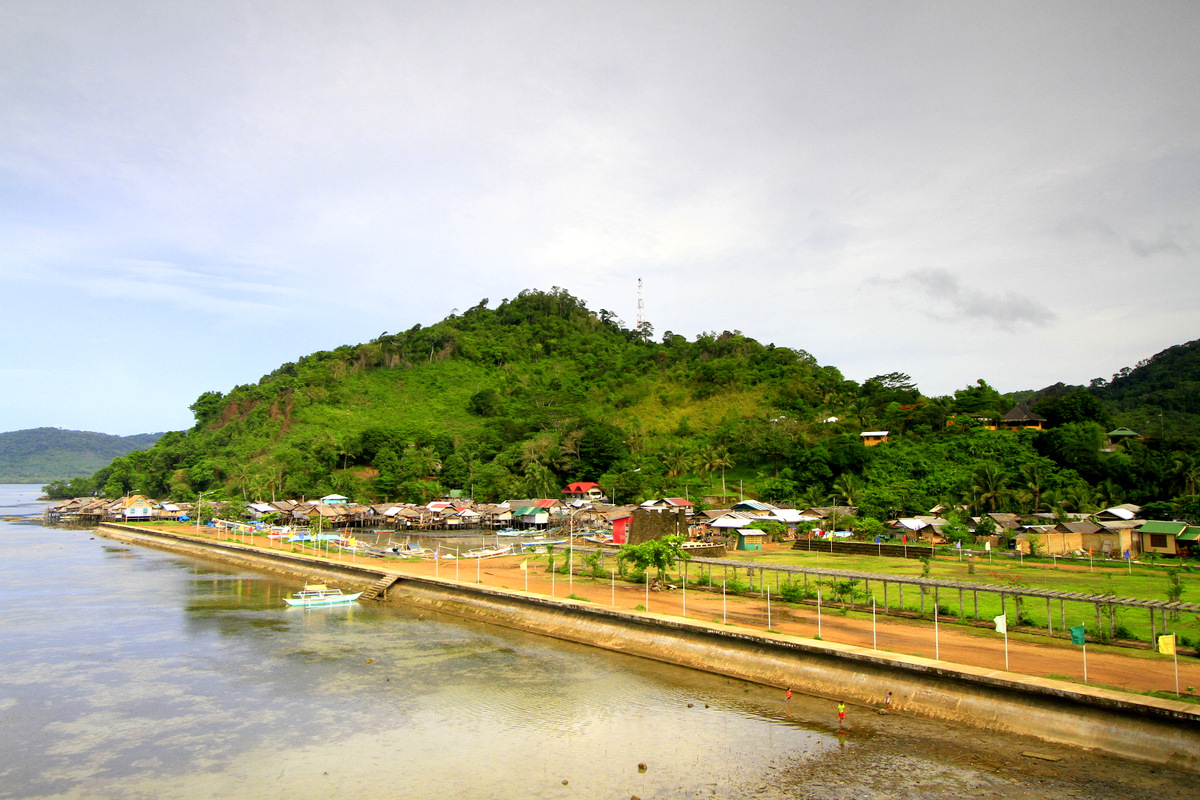
- A village in Taytay

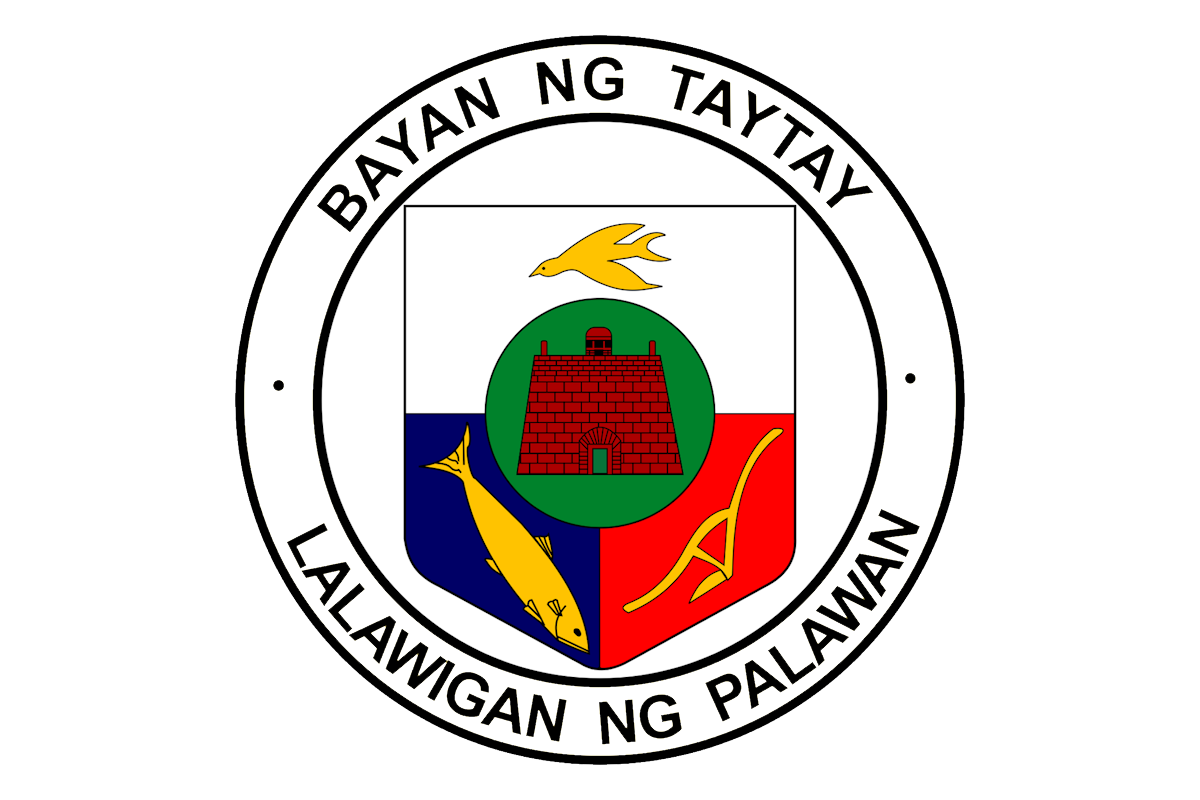
- Flag Seal
- Nickname: King of Northern Palawan
- Motto: Taytay, Una sa Lahat!
- Anthem: Estrella Del Norte Bayan Kong Taytay
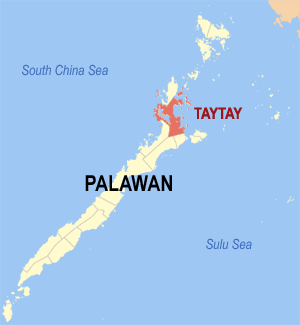
- Map of Palawan with Taytay highlighted
- Interactive map of Taytay
- Location within the Philippines
- Coordinates: 10°49′N 119°31′E
- Country: Philippines
- Region: Mimaropa
- Province: Palawan
- District: 1st district
- Founded: 1623
- Barangays: 31 (see Barangays)

Government
  - Type: Sangguniang Bayan
  - Mayor: Norbert S. Lim
  - Vice Mayor: Delma P. Edep
  - Representative: Rosalie Salvame
  - Municipal Council: Members: Alvino V. Yara; Arlene E. Arzaga; Ovinal L. Salvame; Edilberto Y. Felizarte; Yolando M. Edep, Sr.; Alerey T. Rapsing; Joel M. Parapina; Delia M. Signo
  - Electorate: 53,165 voters (2025)

Area
  - Total: 1,257.68 km^{2} (485.59 sq mi)
- Elevation: 58 m (190 ft)
- Highest elevation: 320 m (1,050 ft)
- Lowest elevation: 0 m (0 ft)

Population (2024 census)
  - Total: 85,258
  - Density: 67.790/km^{2} (175.58/sq mi)
  - Households: 19,482

Economy
  - Income class: 1st municipal income class
  - Poverty incidence: 31.17% (2023)
  - Revenue: ₱ 611.9 million (2024)
  - Assets: ₱ 2,098 million (2024)
  - Expenditure: ₱ 495.8 million (2024)
  - Liabilities: ₱ 496.8 million (2024)

Service provider
  - Electricity: Palawan Electric Cooperative (PALECO)
- Time zone: UTC+8 (PST)
- ZIP code: 5312
- PSGC: 1705320000
- IDD : area code: +63 (0)48
- Native languages: Palawano; Central Tagbanwa; Tagalog

Taytay, officially the Municipality of Taytay (Tagalog: Bayan ng Taytay IPA: [taɪ'taɪ]), is a municipality in the province of Palawan, Philippines. According to the 2024 census, it has a population of 85,258 people. Taytay is 214 kilometres (133 mi) from Puerto Princesa. The town is home to the Malampaya Sound, a protected area which hosts the critically-endangered Irrawaddy dolphin.

Dubbed the "Star of the North," the town is strategically located between the South China Sea and the Sulu Sea, offering popular destinations for snorkeling and diving.

== History ==
=== Precolonial era ===
Before the arrival of the Spanish, the Kingdom of Taytay came to be and was ruled by a monarch noted as being followed everywhere at any given time by ten scribes. The crew of Ferdinand Magellan held the King of Taytay and his consort hostage for ransom after escaping the Battle of Mactan where Magellan was slain. They intended to secure more supplies as they plan to cross into the Moluccas to seek help from the Portuguese there. The king and his subjects complied with the Spaniards’ demands and even added more food supplies than what were asked for. This was duly recorded by Antonio Pigafetta, Magellan's chronicler, who was onboard one of the ships when these events took place.

=== Spanish era ===
During the Spanish colonization of the Philippines, Taytay was formally founded in 1623. Taytay became the capital of the province of Calamianes, the entire territory of Paragua (now Palawan), in 1818; and the province of Castilla, a land area occupying the northern part of Palawan, in 1858.

The historic Taytay Fort, the Fuerza Santa Isabel de la Paragua, built in 1667 under the Augustinian Recollect Fathers and named in honor of Spain's Queen Isabela II in the 19th century, was used as a military station during that period. This famous relic was completed in 1738. It was mainly used to defend against Muslim warrior-raiders in their colorful war boats while the Spanish soldiers fire at them with their huge cannons. The fort's small chapel and cannons are still intact. The fort is now under the supervision of the Municipal Government of Taytay. The Moro action must be understood not as an act of piracy but as a showdown of power and challenge to Spanish hegemony over the islands. It can be viewed as the Tausug's efforts to recover what was once theirs. Similar raids were also carried out against Christian converts in Spanish Cuyo, Dumaran, Linapacan and Culion.

=== Revolutionary era ===
In May 1901, American forces captured Cuyo and neared Taytay. Rufo Sandoval remained defiant amidst this looming threat and refused to surrender the town to the American forces. On May 24, Sandoval’s naval forces encountered the American gunship Samar at Maytiguid, where he lost the battle after being bombarded and fled inland, with most of his forces raising the white flag of surrender. To the Americans’ surprise, the people welcomed their troops. They proceeded to destroy the boats and confiscated the documents of the revolutionary government. Major George LeRoy Brown led the pursuit to Bacuit Island, where he was told that Sandoval had left with 30 men. That was the last sighting of Sandoval who reportedly died not long after due to sickness.

=== American era and post-war independence ===
During the American era, Taytay ceased being Palawan's capital, and its administrative boundary was reduced by approximately 50,000 hectares upon the creation of the Municipality of El Nido in 1916.

In 1957, the Island of Debangan was constituted into a barrio.

On 21 June 1969, San Vicente was created from Puerto Princesa and Taytay, with the barrios of Caruray and the current poblacion of the town being separated from Puerto Princesa while the barrios of New Agutaya and Binga were separated from Taytay.

== Geography ==
=== Barangays ===
Taytay is politically subdivided into 31 barangays. Each barangay consists of puroks and some have sitios.

- Abongan
- Banbanan
- Bantulan
- Batas
- Bato
- Beton
- Busy Bees
- Calawag
- Casian
- Cataban
- Debangan
- Dipla
- Liminangcong
- Maytegued
- New Guinlo
- Old Guinlo
- Pamantolon
- Pancol
- Paly (Paly Island)
- Poblacion
- Pularaquen (Canique)
- San Jose
- Sandoval
- Silanga
- Alacalian
- Baras (Pangpang)
- Libertad
- Minapla
- Talog
- Tumbod
- Paglaum

=== History of barangays ===
Barangay (Barrio)	Creation Date	Mother Territory
Nasalogan	1955	Sitio of Nasalogan
Bambanan	1956	Sitio of Bambanan
Sandoval	1956	Sitio of Calatan

Tumbod. 1972. Liminangcong

== Climate ==
Climate data for Taytay, Palawan
Month	Jan	Feb	Mar	Apr	May	Jun	Jul	Aug	Sep	Oct	Nov	Dec	Year
Mean daily maximum °C (°F)	29 (84)	30 (86)	30 (86)	31 (88)	31 (88)	30 (86)	29 (84)	29 (84)	29 (84)	29 (84)	29 (84)	29 (84)	30 (85)
Mean daily minimum °C (°F)	23 (73)	23 (73)	23 (73)	24 (75)	25 (77)	25 (77)	24 (75)	24 (75)	24 (75)	24 (75)	24 (75)	24 (75)	24 (75)
Average precipitation mm (inches)	45 (1.8)	34 (1.3)	62 (2.4)	64 (2.5)	127 (5.0)	159 (6.3)	172 (6.8)	147 (5.8)	167 (6.6)	182 (7.2)	172 (6.8)	88 (3.5)	1,419 (56)
Average rainy days	12.1	9.4	13.0	14.3	22.7	26.9	28.0	26.4	27.0	27.0	22.7	17.8	247.3
Source: Meteoblue

== Demographics ==
Population census of Taytay

Year	Pop.	±% p.a.
1903	4,992	—
1918	2,833	−3.71%
1939	4,173	+1.86%
1948	4,050	−0.33%
1960	8,607	+6.48%
1970	11,920	+3.31%
1975	17,712	+8.27%
1980	22,980	+5.34%

Year	Pop.	±% p.a.
1990	38,435	+5.28%
1995	47,095	+3.88%
2000	53,657	+2.84%
2007	61,991	+2.01%
2010	70,837	+4.97%
2015	75,165	+1.14%
2020	83,357	+2.20%
2024	85,258	+0.54%

Source: Philippine Statistics Authority

In the 2024 census, the population of Taytay was 85,258 people, with a density of 68 inhabitants per square kilometre or 180 inhabitants per square mile.

== Economy ==
Poverty incidence of Taytay (%)

Source: Philippine Statistics Authority

== Education ==
There are three schools district offices which govern all educational institutions within the municipality. They oversee the management and operations of all private and public, from primary to secondary schools. These are the

- Taytay I Schools District
- Taytay II Schools District
- Taytay III Schools District

=== Primary and elementary schools ===
- Abongan Adventist Elementary School
- Abongan Elementary School
- Alacalian Elementary School
- Banbanan Elementary School
- Bantulan Elementary School
- Baras Elementary School
- Batas Elementary School
- Bato Central School
- Binaluan Elementary School
- Binuan Elementary School
- Biton Elementary School
- Bulalo Elementary School
- Busy Bees Elementary School
- Calabucay Elementary School
- Calabugtong Elementary School
- Calampisao Elementary School
- Calapa Elementary School
- Comalibongbong Elementary School
- Canduyog Elementary School
- Canique Elementary School
- Caroroy Elementary School
- Casian Elementary School
- Cataban Elementary School
- Ching Bing Kao Elementary School
- Cruz Destura Sr. Elementary School
- Debangan Elementary School
- Dinet ElementarySchool
- Dipla Elementary School
- Divine Blessings Learning Center
- Estrella del Norte Adventist Elementary School
- Eufemio Sabroso Elementary School
- Faith Adventist Academy
- Fortress Baptist Christian Academy
- Igang Elementary School
- Judge Cesar L. Rodriguez Elementary School
- Julio Arzaga Elementary School
- Kawakayan Elementary School
- Leba Elementary School
- Libertad Elementary School
- Liminangcong Central School
- Maubog Elementary School
- Maytegued Elementary School
- Minapla Elementary School
- Monte Vista Elementary School
- New Guinlo Elementary School
- Old Guinlo Elementary School
- Pag-asa Elementary School
- Paglaum Elementary School
- Paly Elementary School
- Pamantolon Elementary School
- Pamolot Elementary School
- Pancol Elementary School
- Pinagpala Elementary School
- Sader Elementary School
- San Jose Elementary School
- Sandoval Elementary School
- Silanga Elementary School
- Sigpit Elementary School
- Talog Elementary School
- Taytay West Elementary School
- Tulduan Elementary School
- Tumbod Elementary School
- Yakal Elementary School
- Villa Rogelia Elementary School

=== Secondary schools ===
- Abongan National High School
- Bato National High School
- Busy Bees National High School
- Calawag National High School
- Canique National High Schools
- Casian National High School
- Central Taytay National High Shool
- Central Taytay Senior High School
- Liminangcong National High School
- Malampaya-San Jose National High School
- Montemar Adventist Elementary School
- New Guinlo National High School
- Northern Palawan Christian Institute
- Paly National High School
- Pamantolon National High School
- Pancol National High School
- Saint Ezekiel Moreno High School
- Sandoval National High School
- Silanga National High School

=== Higher educational institutional ===
- San Brendan College
- Palawan State University

== Gallery ==
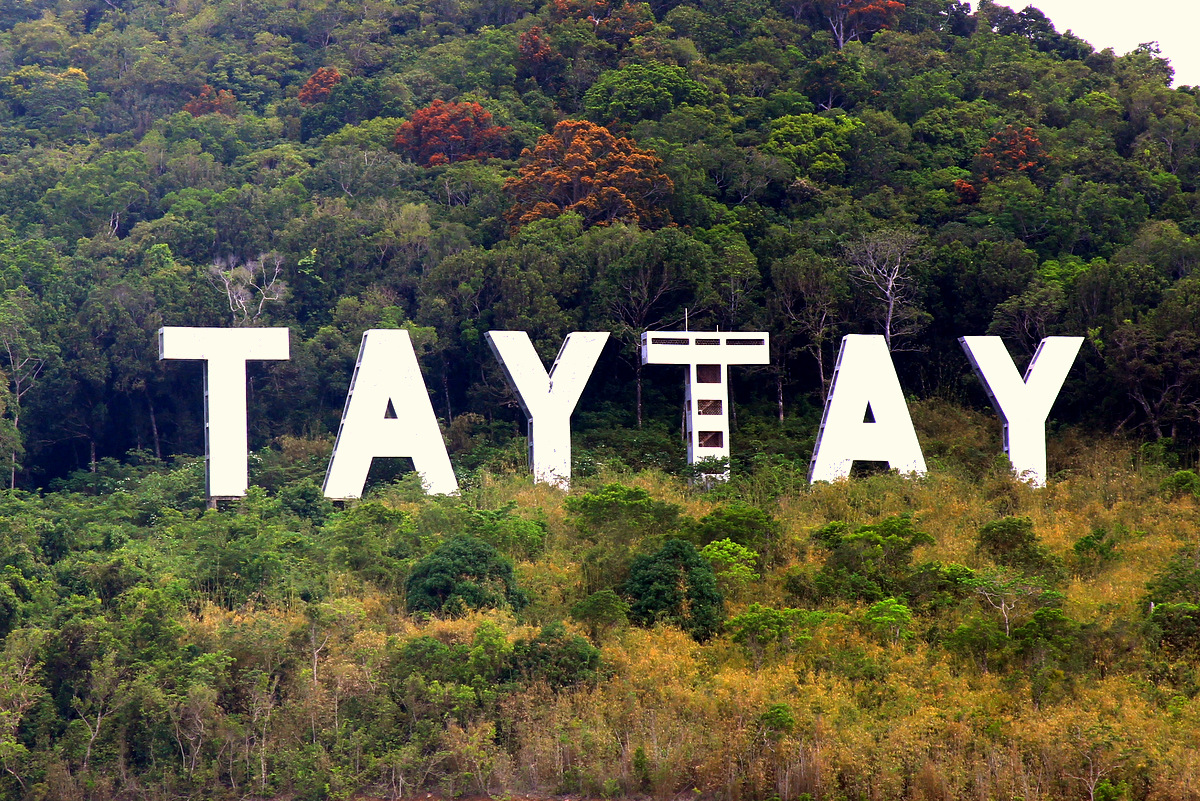
Taytay marquee

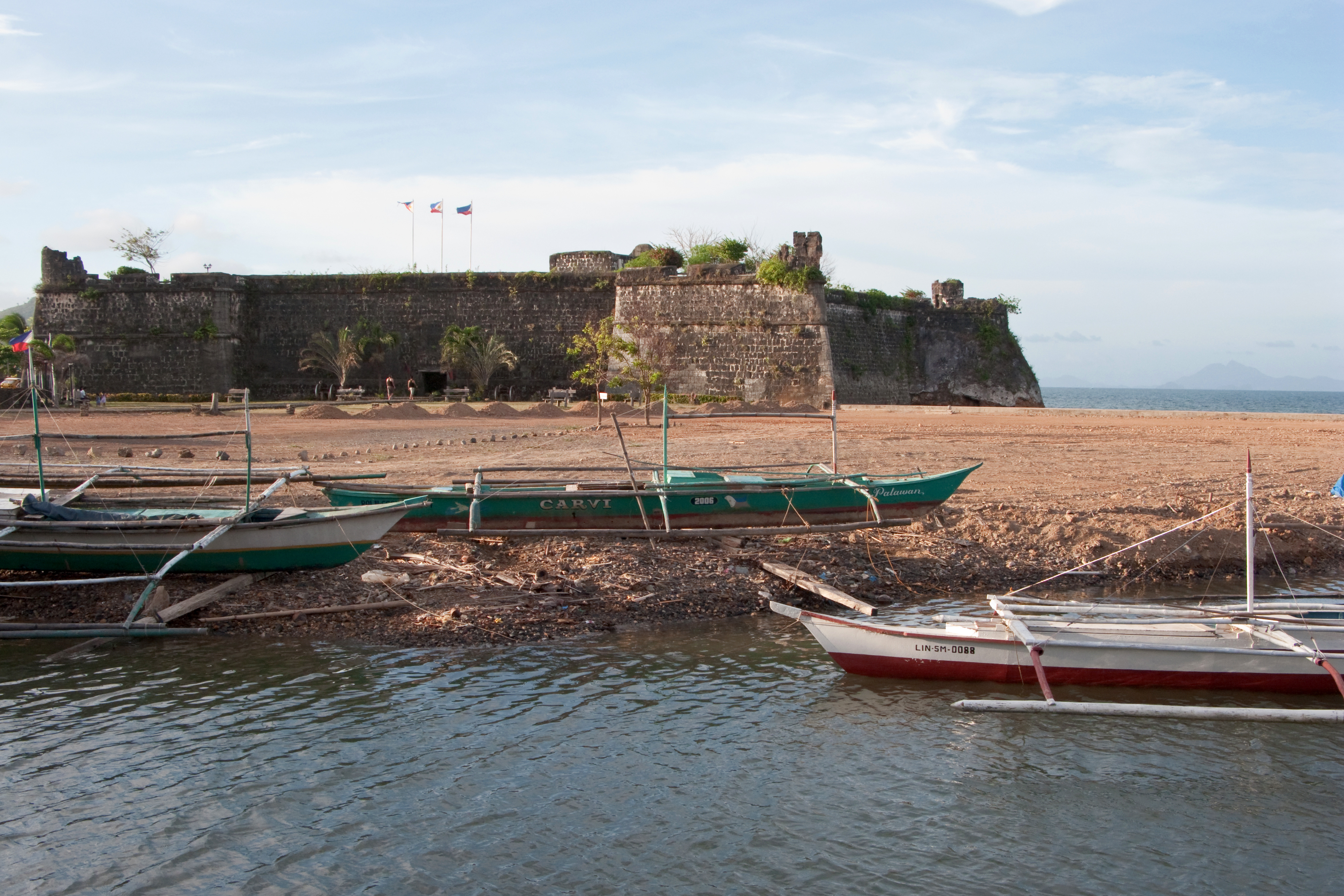
Fort of Santa Isabel

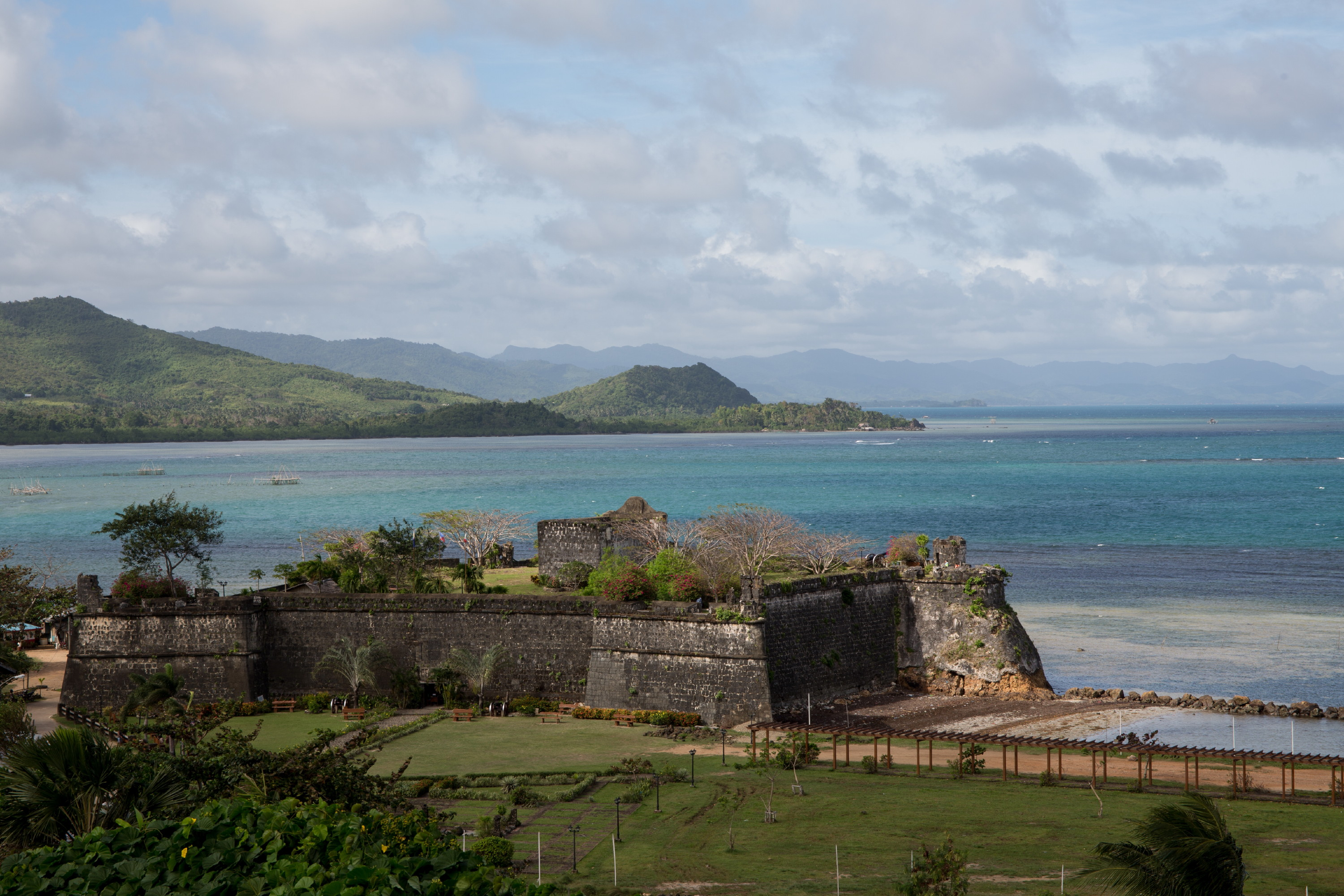
Fort of Santa Isabel, in relation to the sea

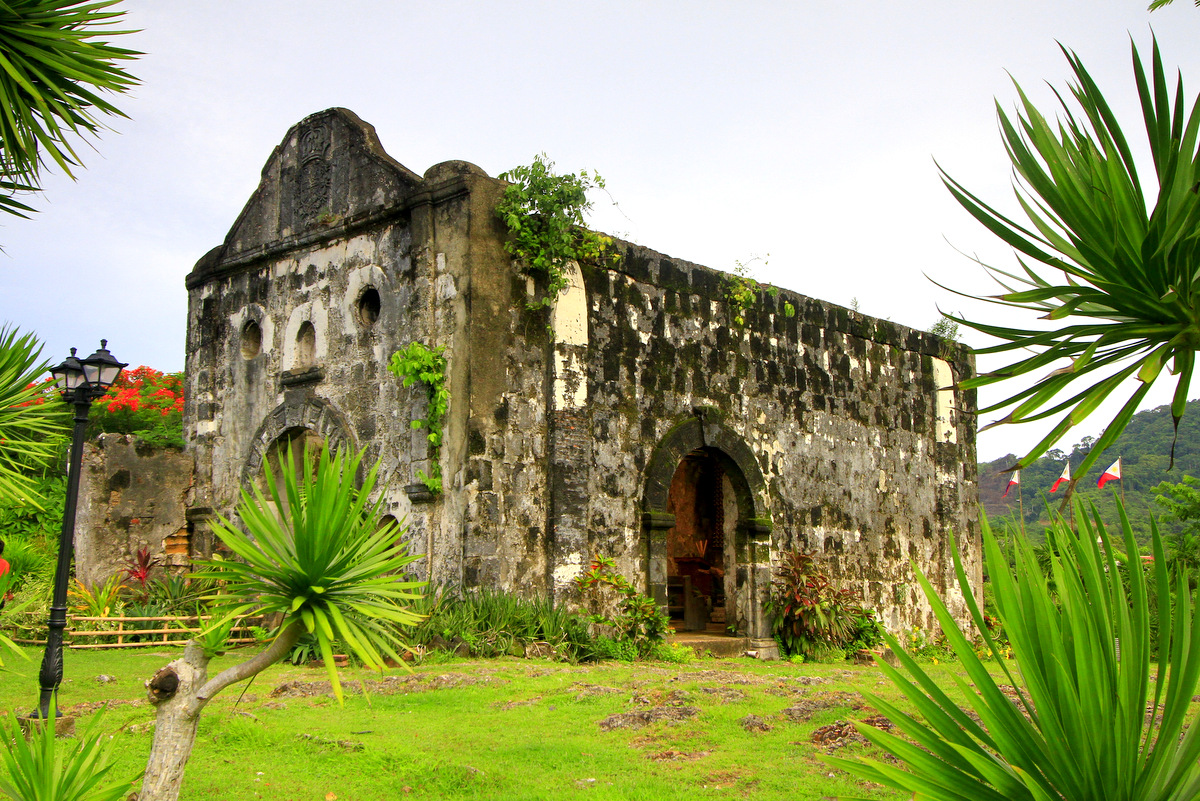
Exterior of the chapel within the Fort of Santa Isabel

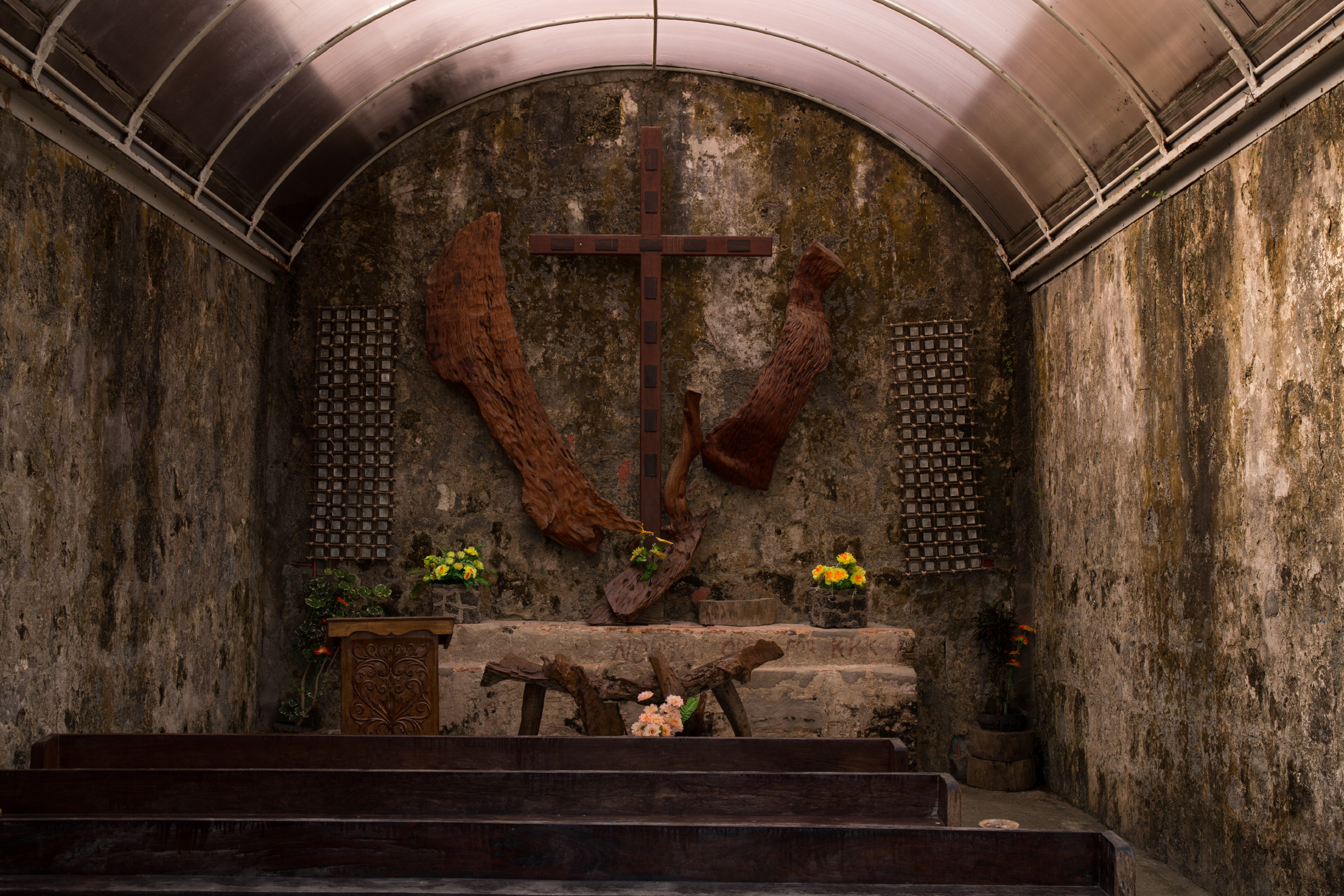
Interior and altar of the chapel inside the Fort of Santa Isabel

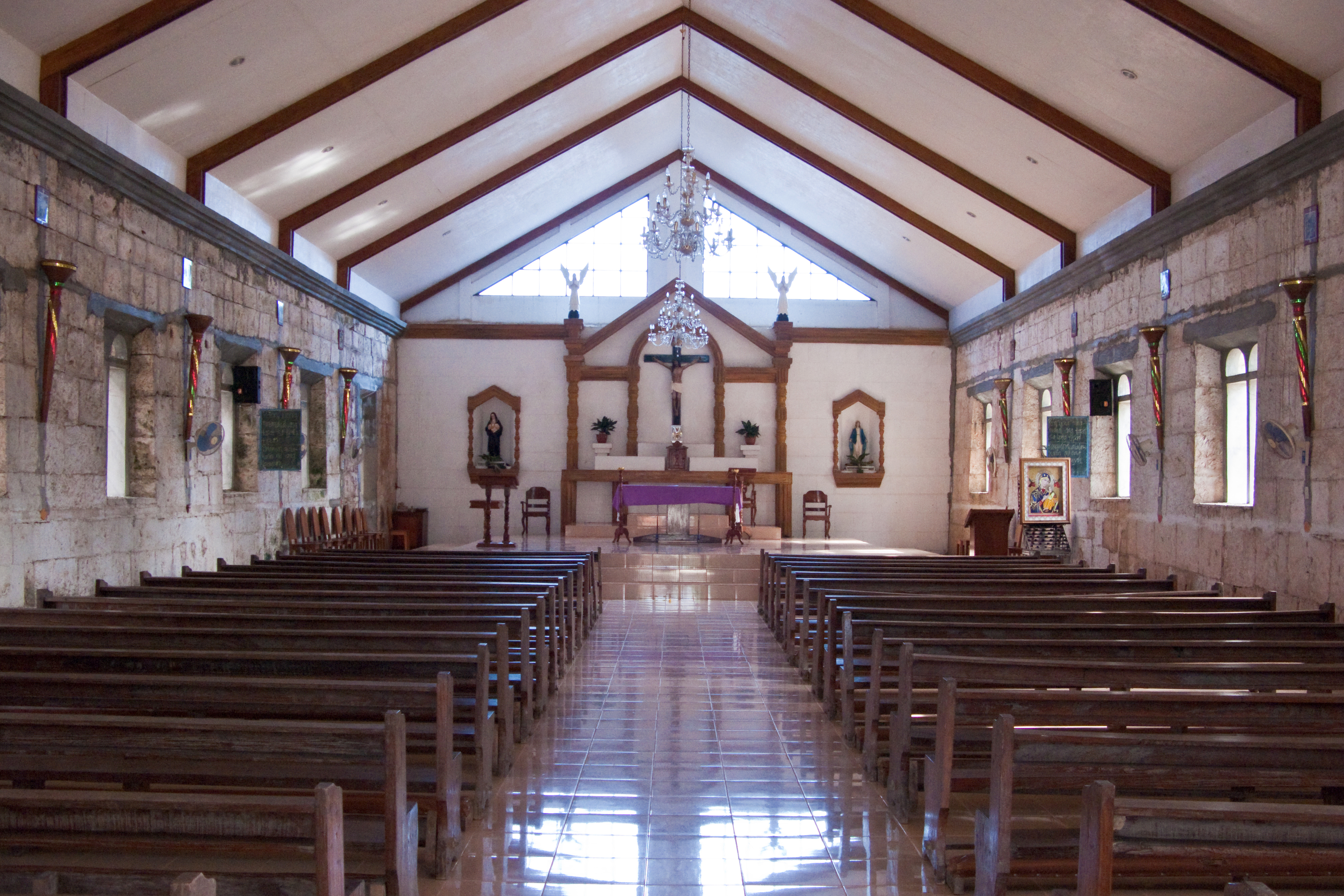
Nave and sanctuary of Santa Mónica Parish Church

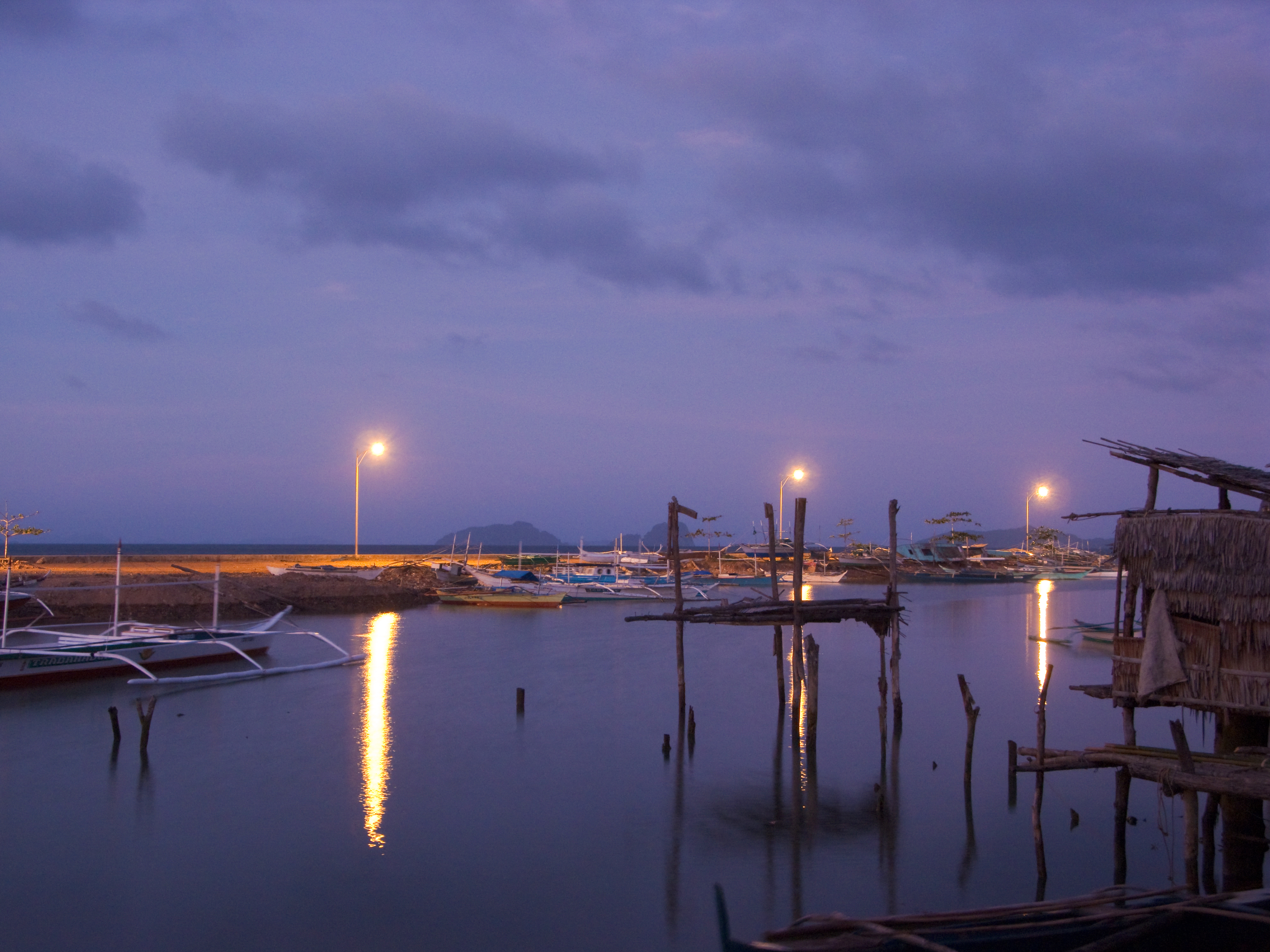
Night by the sea
