= Abraham Mitra =

Filipino politician (born 1970)

Baham Mitra
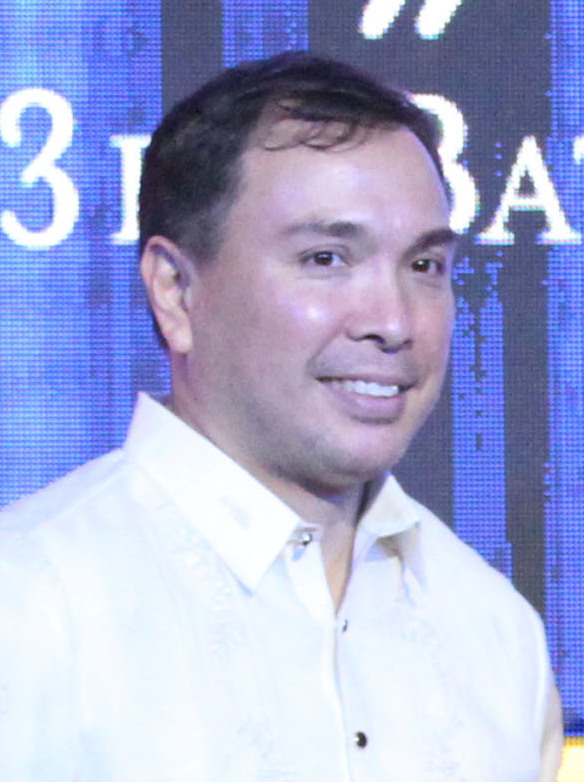
- Mitra in 2018

Chairman of the Games and Amusement Board
- Incumbent
- Assumed office 2016
- President: Rodrigo Duterte; Bongbong Marcos
- Preceded by: Juan Martin Guanzon

22nd Governor of Palawan
- In office June 30, 2010 – June 30, 2013
- Vice Governor: Clara Reyes
- Preceded by: Mario Joel Reyes
- Succeeded by: Jose Alvarez

Member of the Philippine House of Representatives from Palawan's 2nd district
- In office June 30, 2001 – June 30, 2010
- Preceded by: Alfredo Amor Abueg Jr.
- Succeeded by: Victorino Dennis Socrates

Presidential Consultant for Palawan
- In office 1998–2000
- President: Joseph Estrada

Personal details
- Born: Abraham Kahlil Blanco Mitra; January 3, 1970 (age 56) Manila, Philippines
- Party: Nacionalista (2024–present)
- Other political affiliations: Liberal (2001–2024)
- Parent(s): Ramon Mitra Jr. (father); Cecilia Aldeguer Blanco (mother)
- Education: San Beda College (BS)

Abraham Kahlil Blanco Mitra (born January 3, 1970), also known as Baham Mitra, is a Filipino politician, and the chairman of the Games and Amusement Board since 2016. He was a presidential consultant, congressman, and governor of Palawan. He is the youngest son of former House of Representatives Speaker Ramon Mitra, Jr. and Cecilia Aldeguer Blanco.

== Early life and education ==
Mitra was born on January 3, 1970, in Manila. He finished his elementary at the Benedictine Abbey School (now San Beda College Alabang) in Muntinlupa in 1983. He continued his secondary schooling at the same school until 1987. He then studied BS Management at another Benedictine-run school, San Beda College and graduated in 1991.

== Political career ==
Following the footsteps of his father who worked for the Philippine government for a very long time, Baham Mitra entered politics at a very young age. Baham was a Presidential Consultant for Palawan from 1998 until 2000 under President Joseph Estrada. He became a member of the House of Representatives representing the second legislative district of Palawan for three consecutive terms until 2010. Programs and projects for the welfare of his representation were massively implemented as he lobbied for the national government to appropriate sufficient funds thereof. High priorities were made for health, education, environmental protection and for the prime mover of the province's growth-tourism.

Mitra bid for a gubernatorial post during the 2010 synchronized local and national elections. His attempt was full of trials as he was lambasted with protests allegedly for his unqualified residency requirement for such position. This complicated saga begun as opponents accused Mitra of lying on his residency status. He claimed to have lived in a basement of a feed mill located in the municipality of Aborlan where he has been living since March 2008. Legal battle ensued as it reached the Supreme Court where if finally tendered its decision on Mitra's favor in October 2010.

Mitra's stint as the provincial governor is also dramatic as recall election followed as he seated in the provincial capitol. This made headlines as a sectoral group called Kilusan Love Malampaya (KLM) filed a petition for recall on alleged grounds of "loss of trust and confidence" in September 2011. In a statement, KLM accused Mitra of having "compromised" Palawan's interests for accepting Malacañang's offer of a significantly smaller portion of the province's share of royalties amounting to P60 billion paid by the Malampaya consortium operating the natural gas project in offshore northern Palawan close to the municipality of El Nido. However, this election did not realize, as the Commission of Elections was not able to decide on the matter immediately and the next mid-term elections for 2013 is just a few months away. Mitra ran for reelection in 2013 but lost to Jose Alvarez, whom he defeated in 2010.

Mitra's leadership in the Palawan saw the province gain popularity for its promotion of sustainable development through economic and tourism synergy working hand in hand to achieve holistic progress.

In 2016, President Rodrigo Duterte appointed him as chairman of the Games and Amusement Board.

In 2025, Mitra ran for representative for Palawan's 3rd district but lost to Gil Acosta Jr.

== Controversy ==
Mitra was also involved with the criminal charges of graft over fertilizer fund scam. The charges were later dismissed in 2016 by the Sandiganbayan due to delays on the prosecution.
