= Palawan Provincial Board =

Legislative body of the province of Palawan, Philippines

Palawan Provincial Board Sangguniang Panlalawigan ng Palawan
- 45th Sangguniang Panlalawigan ng Palawan
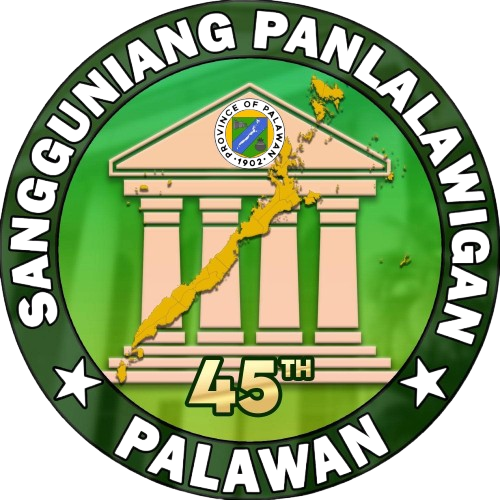

Type
- Type: Unicameral
- Term limits: 3 terms (9 years)

Leadership
- Presiding Officer: Leoncio N. Ola, PPP since June 30, 2025

Structure
- Seats: 14 board members 1 ex officio presiding officer
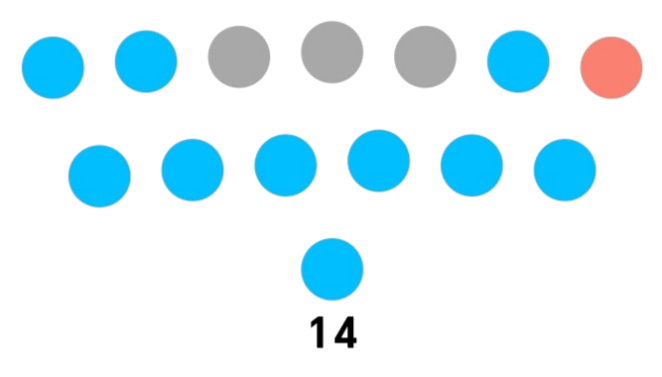
- Political groups: PPP (10) PRP (1) Nonpartisan (3)
- Length of term: 3 years
- Authority: Local Government Code of the Philippines

Elections
- Voting system: Multiple non-transferable vote (regular members); Indirect election (ex officio members); Acclamation (sectoral member)
- Last election: May 12, 2025
- Next election: May 8, 2028

Meeting place
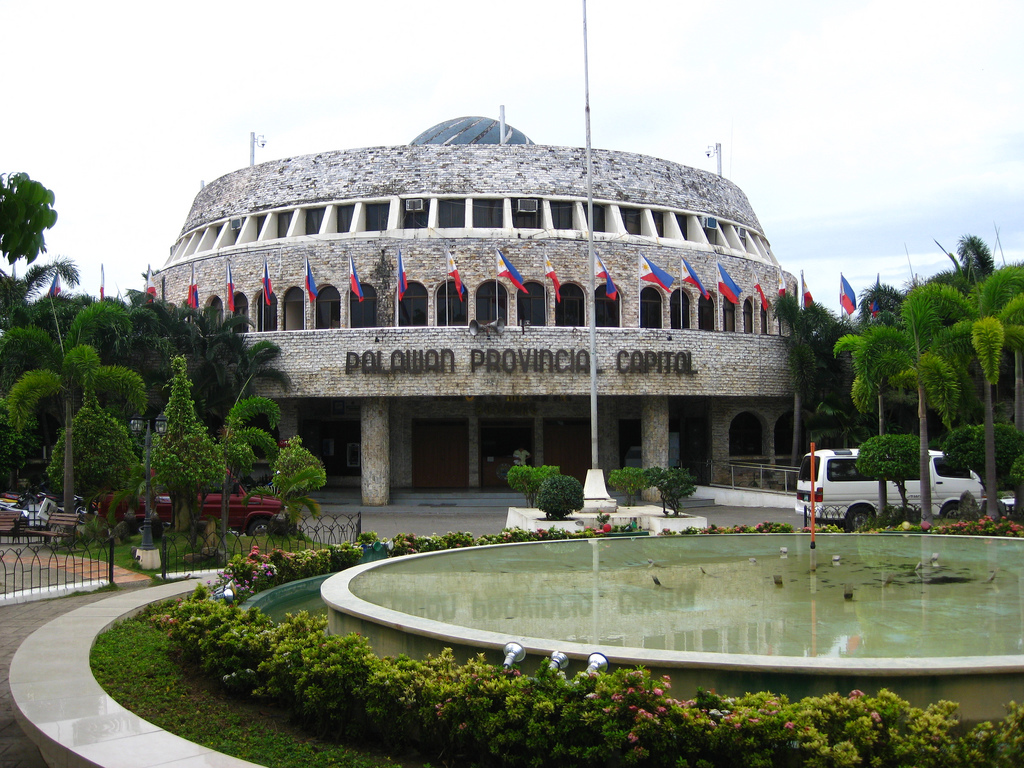
- Rizal Avenue, Provincial Capitol Building, Puerto Princesa City, 5300

The Palawan Provincial Board is the Sangguniang Panlalawigan (provincial legislature) of the Philippine province of Palawan.

The members are elected via plurality-at-large voting: the province is divided into three districts, the first district sending five members, the second sending four members, and the third district sending one member to the provincial board; the number of candidates the electorate votes for and the number of winning candidates depends on the number of members their district sends. The vice governor is the ex officio presiding officer, and only votes to break ties. The vice governor is elected via the plurality voting system province-wide.

The districts used in appropriation of members is coextensive with the legislative districts of Palawan, with the exception that Puerto Princesa, a highly urbanized city, is excluded in the third district.

Aside from the regular members, the board also includes the provincial federation presidents of the Liga ng mga Barangay (ABC, from its old name "Association of Barangay Captains"), the Sangguniang Kabataan (SK, youth councils) and the Philippine Councilors League (PCL). Palawan's provincial board also has a reserved seat for its indigenous people (IPMR).

== Apportionment ==
Elections	Seats per district			Ex officio seats	Reserved seats	Total seats
Elections	1st	2nd	3rd	Ex officio seats	Reserved seats	Total seats
2010–13	5	5	—	3	1	14
2013–present	5	4	1	3	1	14

== List of members ==
=== Current members ===
These are the members after the 2025 local elections and 2023 barangay and SK elections:

- Vice Governor: Leoncio N. Ola (PPP)

Seat	Board member	Party	Start of term	End of term
1st district	Juan Antonio E. Alvarez	PPPL	June 30, 2022	June 30, 2028
1st district	Winston G. Arzaga	PPPL	June 30, 2022	June 30, 2028
1st district	Maria Angela V. Sabando	PRP	June 30, 2019	June 30, 2028
1st district	Roseller S. Pineda	PPPL	June 30, 2022	June 30, 2028
1st district	Cherry Pie B. Acosta	PPPL	June 30, 2025	June 30, 2028
2nd district	Al-Nasher M. Ibba	PPPL	June 30, 2022	June 30, 2028
2nd district	Ryan D. Maminta	PPPL	June 30, 2019	June 30, 2028
2nd district	Marivic H. Roxas	PPPL	June 30, 2022	June 30, 2028
2nd district	Ariston D. Arzaga	PPPL	June 30, 2022	June 30, 2028
3rd district	Rafael V. Ortega Jr.	PPPL	June 30, 2022	June 30, 2028
ABC	Ferdinand Zaballa	Nonpartisan	June 30, 2019	January 1, 2023
PCL	TBD		June 30, 2025	June 30, 2028
SK	Anyatika Rodriguez	Nonpartisan	June 8, 2018	January 1, 2023
IPMR	Purita Seguritan	Nonpartisan	February 11, 2020	February 11, 2023

=== Vice governor ===
Election year	Name	Party	Ref.
2016	Victorino Dennis Socrates	PPPL	
2019	Victorino Dennis Socrates	PPPL	
2022	Leoncio N. Ola	PPPL	
2025	Leoncio N. Ola	PPPL	

=== 1st district ===
- Population (2024):

Election year	Member (party)	Member (party)	Member (party)	Member (party)	Member (party)	Ref.
2016	Roseller S. Pineda (Liberal)	David A. Ponce de Leon (Liberal)	Winston G. Arzaga (Liberal)	Leoncio N. Ola (PPPL)	Cherry Pie B. Acosta (PPPL)	
2019	Juan Antonio E. Alvarez (NUP)	David A. Ponce de Leon (PPPL)	Maria Angela V. Sabando (PPPL)	Winston G. Arzaga (PDP–Laban)	Cherry Pie B. Acosta (PPPL)	
2022	Juan Antonio E. Alvarez (NUP)	Roseller S. Pineda (PDP–Laban)	Maria Angela V. Sabando (PPPL)	Winston G. Arzaga (PDP–Laban)	Nieves C. Rosento (PRP)	
2025	Juan Antonio E. Alvarez (PPPL)	Roseller S. Pineda (PPPL)	Maria Angela V. Sabando (PRP)	Winston G. Arzaga (PPPL)	Cherry Pie B. Acosta (PPPL)	

=== 2nd district ===
- Population (2024):

Election year	Member (party)	Member (party)	Member (party)	Member (party)	Ref.
2016	Sharon A. Onda (PPPL)	Marivic H. Roxas (PPPL)	Modesto Jay Rodriguez (PPPL)	Sunny G. Batul (PPPL)	
2019	Sharon A. Onda (PPPL)	Cesario R. Benedito Jr. (PPPL)	Modesto Jay Rodriguez (PPPL)	Ryan D. Maminta (PPPL)	
2022	Ariston D. Arzaga (PPPL)	Marivic H. Roxas (Aksyon)	Al-Nasher M. Ibba (PPPL)	Ryan D. Maminta (Lakas)	
2025	Ariston D. Arzaga (PPPL)	Marivic H. Roxas (PPPL)	Al-Nasher M. Ibba (PPPL)	Ryan D. Maminta (PPPL)	

=== 3rd district ===
- Population (2024):

Election year	Member (party)	Ref.
2016	Albert Rama (PPPL)	
2019	Albert Rama (PDP–Laban)	
2022	Rafael V. Ortega Jr. (Aksyon)	
2025	Rafael V. Ortega Jr. (PPPL)	
