= Partidong Pagbabago ng Palawan =

Political party in the Philippines

- Leader: Jose Alvarez
- Founded: 2009
- Ideology: Regionalism
- National affiliation: NPC (2012–2015; 2024–present); HNP (2019); PDP–Laban (2018–2024); Liberal (2015–2018)
- House of Representatives: 2 / 3 (Palawan seats only)
- Provincial governors: 1 / 1 (Palawan seats only)
- Provincial vice governors: 1 / 1 (Palawan seats only)
- Provincial board members: 9 / 10 (Palawan seats only)

Partidong Pagbabago ng Palawan (PPPL; lit. 'Palawan's Party of Change') is a local political party in Palawan.

== History ==
=== 2019 elections ===
In the 2019 elections, the party forged an alliance with Hugpong ng Pagbabago in a rally held by Sara Duterte. The alliance also included a sister-city pact between Puerto Princesa and Davao City. After the alliance, the party garnered most of the local positions in the province which includes its three congressional seats, governor, vice governor and members of the Palawan Provincial Board.

=== 2022 elections ===
In September 2021, the party held a convention to formalize and promote their candidates for the 2022 elections, the candidates included Vice Governor Victorino Dennis Socrates for governor and Board Member Leoncio Ola for governor and vice governor respectively. Both of the candidates eventually won.

=== 2024 breakup ===
Governor Dennis Socrates, who was a member of the party, announced his resignation from the party after being a decade-long member of the party. His reason for the breakup was that the party and himself were "divergent" on multiple issues, leading to his resignation. On September 10, Socrates joined Aksyon Demokratiko, the party of former Manila Mayor Isko Moreno, and appointed as the party's provincial chairperson.
