= Jose Alvarez (Filipino politician) =

Filipino politician (born 1944)

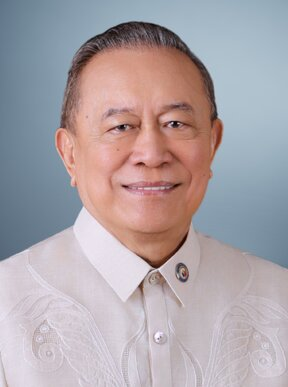
- Official portrait, 2025

Member of the Philippine House of Representatives from Palawan's 2nd district
- Incumbent
- Assumed office June 30, 2022
- Preceded by: Beng Abueg

23rd Governor of Palawan
- In office June 30, 2013 – June 30, 2022
- Vice Governor: Victorino Dennis Socrates
- Preceded by: Abraham Mitra
- Succeeded by: Victorino Dennis Socrates

President of Partido Demokratiko Pilipino
- In office September 29, 2022 – July 24, 2024
- Preceded by: Alfonso Cusi
- Succeeded by: Robin Padilla

Personal details
- Born: Jose Chaves Alvarez; June 29, 1944 (age 82) Kidapawan, Cotabato, Commonwealth of the Philippines
- Party: NPC (2012–2015; 2024–present); PPPL (local party; 2009–present)
- Other political affiliations: PDP (2018–2024); Liberal (2015–2018)
- Spouse: Norma Roa Alvarez
- Children: Amy Alvarez
- Education: Cebu Institute of Technology; Xavier University – Ateneo de Cagayan (BA)
- Occupation: Politician

Jose Chaves Alvarez (born June 29, 1944), known by initials JCA, is a Filipino businessman and politician from the province of Cotabato, Philippines who is serving as the representative of Palawan's 2nd congressional district since 2022. He previously served as the Governor of the province from 2013 to 2022.

== Early life and education ==
Jose Alvarez was born on June 29, 1944 in Kidapawan to Engr. Tomas Alvarez and Lilia Alvarez. At the age of six, he started his education at the Jesuit-run Ateneo de Davao University. He then pursued his secondary education at San Nicholas College, now St. Paul University Surigao, and finished the same in 1960.

When he was 16 years old, Alvarez took Chemical Engineering at Cebu Institute of Technology – University. But due to financial constraints, he was forced to transfer to Xavier University and enroll in Liberal Arts. Because he wanted to help his family and avoid becoming a burden to his parents, the young Jose financed his university education by working as a collector in an insurance agency. Through his own perseverance and skills, he was able to graduate from college in 1964.

== Business career ==
After his graduation, Alvarez ventured into a small used-car trading business in Cagayan de Oro. In 1969, he was able to expand his business to Mandaue. In 1970, he was presented an opportunity to start a logging business in Indonesia and immediately grabbed the same. He stayed in the forests of Indonesia for seven years, before returning to the province of Palawan. He also owns the Terrafirma Dyip that currently plays in the Philippine Basketball Association.

== Electoral history ==
Electoral history of Jose Alvarez
Year	Office	Party		Votes received				Result
Year	Office	Local	National	Total	%	P.	Swing	Result
2010	Governor of Palawan	PPPL	—N/a	131,872	46.74%	2nd	—N/a	Lost
2013	Governor of Palawan	PPPL	NPC	196,302	61.06%	1st	—N/a	Won
2016	Governor of Palawan	PPPL	Liberal	194,262	—N/a	1st	—N/a	Won
2019	Governor of Palawan	PPPL	PDP–Laban	207,875	59.25%	1st	—N/a	Won
2022	Representative (Palawan–2nd)	PPPL	PDP–Laban	99,081	51.77%	1st	—N/a	Won
2025	Representative (Palawan–2nd)	PPPL	NPC	139,469	67.29%	1st	—N/a	Won
