= 2021 Palawan division plebiscite =

Plebiscite about dividing Palawan into three new provinces, held in 2021

- March 13, 2021
- Do you consent to the division of the province of Palawan into three provinces to be named: Palawan del Norte, Palawan Oriental, and Palawan del Sur pursuant to Republic Act No. 11259?
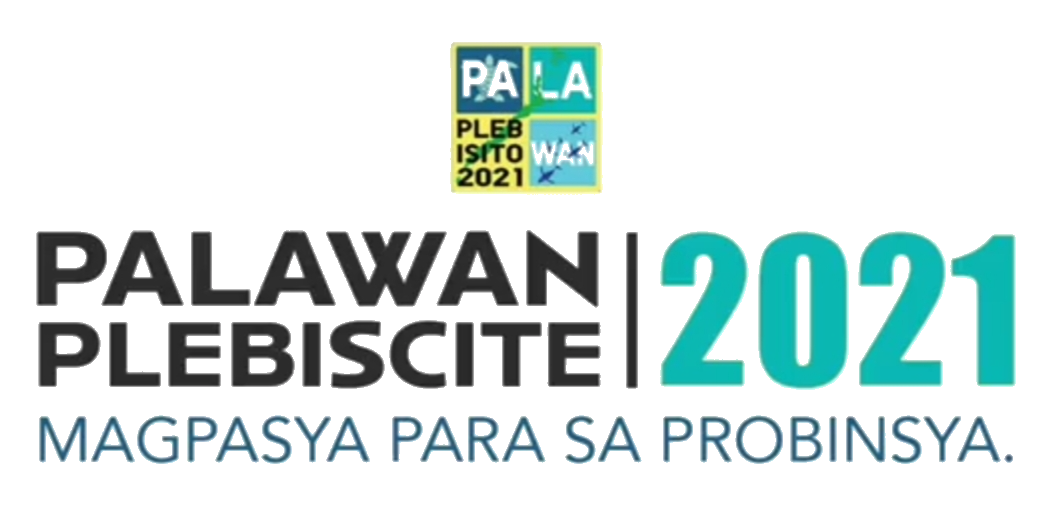
- Outcome: Proposal rejected

Results
Choice	Votes	%
Yes	122,223	41.50%
No	172,304	58.50%
Valid votes	294,527	98.92%
Invalid or blank votes	3,201	1.08%
Total votes	297,728	100.00%
Registered voters/turnout	490,219	60.73%
- Results by municipality; inset: Kalayaan (same scale)
- Yes: 50–60% 60–70% 70–80% No: 50–60% 60–70% 70–80%

The Palawan division plebiscite was a plebiscite held in the province of Palawan, Philippines, on March 13, 2021. As required by Republic Act No. 11259, the plebiscite was conducted to seek the consent of the residents of Palawan to the proposal to divide the province into three separate provinces: Palawan del Norte, Palawan del Sur, and Palawan Oriental.

It was originally scheduled to take place on May 11, 2020, but was postponed indefinitely due to quarantine measures implemented in response to the COVID-19 pandemic in the Philippines. It was eventually held on March 13, 2021. According to the final tally published on March 16, voters rejected the proposal.

== Background ==
During the Spanish colonial period, what is the current province of Palawan was organized into the province of Calamianes in 1818. It was later divided into two provinces: Castilla and Asturias, later it was divided into three districts, the two named provinces, and Balabac. In 1902, during the American colonial period, Americans established civil rule in northern Palawan, calling it "Paragua". A year later, it was reorganized to include the southern portions under the name of "Palawan".

=== Legislative history ===
In 2017, the Palawan Provincial Board unanimously passed a resolution to divide the province into three, which will be called Northern, East Central, and Southern Palawan. Proponents argued that it will lead to more tourism opportunities and speed up delivery of basic social services to the residents.

House Bill No. 8055 was unanimously passed in third reading by the House of Representatives on August 30, 2018. This will lead to Palawan being split into three. Palawan 1st district Congressman Franz Alvarez allayed fears that it was a gerrymander, saying that it is not because "to gerrymander is to consolidate, not to split and micro-manage.

Before the Senate was to debate on the bill, civil society groups in Palawan opposed the measure. Cynthia del Rosario of the Save Palawan Movement said that the House of Representatives railroaded House Bill No. 8055, and that it was approved "without undergoing prior public consultation". At this point, the names of the provinces were "Palawan del Norte," "Palawan del Sur," and "Palawan Oriental." Governor Jose Alvarez (uncle of Congressman Franz Alvarez), the Palawan Provincial Board and the three congressmen from Palawan pushed for the proposal. Senator Sonny Angara, chairman of the Senate Committee on Local Government, endorsed the proposal.

The Senate Committee on Local Government approved the bill on second reading on November 14. Five days later, the Senate passed the bill on third reading, with 14 voting for and only Risa Hontiveros voting against. The House of Representatives concurred with amendments by the Senate on January 28, 2019. Hontiveros explained that "Instead of having to face a single, strong provincial government which can mobilize the entire island in its own defense, China will now have the opportunity to infiltrate and influence smaller local government units".

Republic Act No. 11259, dividing the Philippine province of Palawan into three separate provinces, was signed into law by President Rodrigo Duterte on April 5, 2019. The act will only take effect if voters in the province vote in favor of the law in a plebiscite.

Governor Jose Alvarez was re-elected governor in the May 2019 gubernatorial elections, and his Partidong Pagbabago ng Palawan won a near sweep of all province-level elective posts.

=== Proposed provinces ===
The then-proposed provinces of Palawan del Norte, Palawan del Sur, and Palawan Oriental, with Puerto Princesa to remain an independent city

Republic Act No. 11259 proposed the division of Palawan into three provinces. The following are the then-proposed component municipalities of the three provinces:

- Palawan del Norte – Busuanga, Coron, Culion, El Nido, and Linapacan, with Taytay as its capital
- Palawan del Sur – Aborlan, Balabac, Bataraza, Kalayaan, Narra, Quezon, Rizal, and Sofronio Española, with Brooke's Point as its capital
- Palawan Oriental – Agutaya, Araceli, Cagayancillo, Cuyo, Dumaran, Magsaysay, and San Vicente, with Roxas as its capital

Palawan del Sur was the designated "mother province" and could have been the legal successor of the Palawan province.

=== Inclusion of Puerto Princesa ===
The highly urbanized city of Puerto Princesa, which is not under the jurisdiction of the Palawan provincial government and is only statistically and geographically considered part of the province, will continue to be independent of any province. As such, its residents did not participate in the plebiscite; if the division is approved, it would be grouped with the southern province thereafter. However, a petition was filed in Supreme Court, which sought the inclusion of Puerto Princesa residents in the plebiscite. The court unanimously dismissed the petition, ruling that the since Puerto Princesa is a highly urbanized city and is no longer under the jurisdiction of the province, it cannot be one of the "political units directly affected" by the plebiscite.

== Preparation ==
=== Scheduling ===
As per law, the plebiscite for the division of Palawan was originally scheduled on "the second Monday of May 2020" (May 11). However, the plebiscite was suspended in late March due to the COVID-19 pandemic. If a "majority of the votes cast by the voters of the affected areas" voted in favor of the law, the Palawan would be divided into three provinces: Palawan del Norte, Palawan del Sur, and Palawan Oriental. It is unclear what the fate of the proposed partition will be if a majority in one of the proposed three provinces rejected the motion in the plebiscite.

There are 490,639 registered voters eligible to participate in the plebiscite.

By mid-May 2020, Palawan governor Jose Alvarez said that he expects the plebiscite to be done by July, adding that once the general community quarantine is lifted in Palawan, the Commission on Elections would reschedule it. Commissioner Rowena Guanzon hinted that the plebiscite would not take place until the province is no longer locked down.

On May 15, 2020, Mimaropa, including Palawan and Puerto Princesa, was placed in modified general community quarantine, the lowest form of quarantine available. By July 3, 2020, the local COMELEC office was awaiting on a memorandum from the main COMELEC office in Manila on when the plebiscite would take place. The provincial information office earlier said that it expects the plebiscite to be done by August 2020, or at least anytime that year.

By July 2020, the commission deferred to the Inter-Agency Task Force for the Management of Emerging Infectious Diseases (IATF-EID) on scheduling when the plebiscite could be held. The IATF-EID recommended the commission to conduct it with minimum exposure of the voters to the coronavirus, provide additional health safety measures, including the addition of new polling precincts to reduce congestion. The groups campaigning against the division pointed out that activities related to the plebiscite involves mass gatherings and would be against the guidelines imposed by the government.

In October 2020, the task force approved preparations to hold the plebiscite in the first quarter of 2021. In December 2020, the COMELEC approved the conduct of the plebiscite on March 13, 2021. For the purpose of the rescheduled plebiscite, ballots already printed and bearing the original plebiscite date were used and still considered valid.

=== Question ===
The ballot question is as follows:

In Filipino:

"Pumapayag ka ba na hatiin ang probinsya ng Palawan sa tatlong probinsya na papangalanang: Palawan del Norte, Palawan Oriental at Palawan del Sur alinsunod sa Batas Republika Bilang 11259?

English translation:

Do you consent to the division of the province of Palawan into three provinces to be named: Palawan del Norte, Palawan Oriental, and Palawan del Sur pursuant to Republic Act No. 11259?

Voters were opted to write "yes" or "oo" if they agree, or "no" or "hindi" if they oppose the proposal.

=== Organization ===
The COMELEC did not require voters to wear face shields during the plebiscite, in a bid to combat voter disenfranchisement; however, wearing face masks was still required, as iterated in prevailing COVID-19 regulations imposed nationwide. Isolation polling places (IPPs) were also set up in addition to regular polling precincts. Voters with COVID-19 symptoms and answered "yes" in any of the questions on the health declaration form which were filled up as part of contact tracing efforts, were only allowed to vote in IPPs.

== Campaign ==
Two groups emerged in line with the plebiscite. The pro-division group, named as "3-in-1", was spearheaded by the Palawan provincial government. Those who were against coalesced into the "One Palawan Movement". Cynthia Sumagaysay-Del Rosario, a convener of the One Palawan Movement said that more voters did not vote for governor Jose Alvarez in the 2019 gubernatorial election, with Alvarez winning 207,875 votes, as against the 142,954 from other candidates, and 172,485 who did not vote for governor. Winston Arzaga, the provincial information officer, said that Del Rosario's findings "does not deserve a comment", and that contrary to those who opposed the division, the provincial government had been conducting an information education campaign for the proposed division, even in its bill stage.

By December 2020, Governor Alvarez was confident of the measure being approved by the people. Later that month, The Philippine Star branded the plebiscite as "gerrymandering in a pandemic".

The Palawan NGO Network Inc. (PNNI) opposed the proposal of dividing Palawan. In January 2021, the Palawan Provincial Board passed a resolution declaring environment lawyer and PNNI chief Robert Chan as persona non grata or unwelcome in Palawan. The resolution came after a two-year-old video circulated on social media, where Chan said that Palawan is "terribly mismanaged and neglected, with illegal logging, illegal fishing, and mining seemingly promoted to give in to big business." In response to the declaration, Chan inferred that the "no" campaign for the plebiscite may be gaining ground.

The National Secretariat for Social Action, Justice and Peace of the Catholic Bishops' Conference of the Philippines expressed concern on the plebiscite, saying the division would affect Palawan's biodiversity and indigenous peoples' communities. Apostolic coordinator of the Apostolic Vicariate of Taytay Father Rey Aguanta said that "the law was mostly due to personal and vested political interests, and not to pave the way for genuine human development", and that the money spent for the plebiscite should have instead been spent on COVID-19 vaccines and other services.

On February 11, 2021, the campaign period officially started, which was scheduled to end on the eve of the plebiscite for election silence. Any Filipino citizen based in the Philippines, including those from outside Palawan could legally participate in the campaign. Appointed government officials were barred from participating. By the following week, the Philippine Daily Inquirer published an opinion piece from the Coalition Against Land Grabbing urging voters to vote "no" in the plebiscite, preferring for the local government to implement laws on wildlife and indigenous peoples, and that the people in Palawan did not ask their province to be divided.

Less than two weeks before the vote, the Legal Network for Truthful Elections (LENTE), an elections watchdog, asked the commission to conduct debates regarding the plebiscite. LENTE cited limited face-to-face interactions, poor telecommunications, and no local television channel was focused on an information campaign about the plebiscite. The commission replied the next day that instead of debates, they would conduct an information campaign via radio. Radio was chosen as the best mass medium due to Palawan's poor internet connectivity. The commission assured both pro- and anti-division groups would be given airtime.

On a week before the plebiscite, One Palawan Movement accused the pro-division camp of buying votes; the Partidong Pagbabago ng Palawan, a political party supporting the province's division, dared the anti-division camp of showing evidence of such activities.

== Results ==
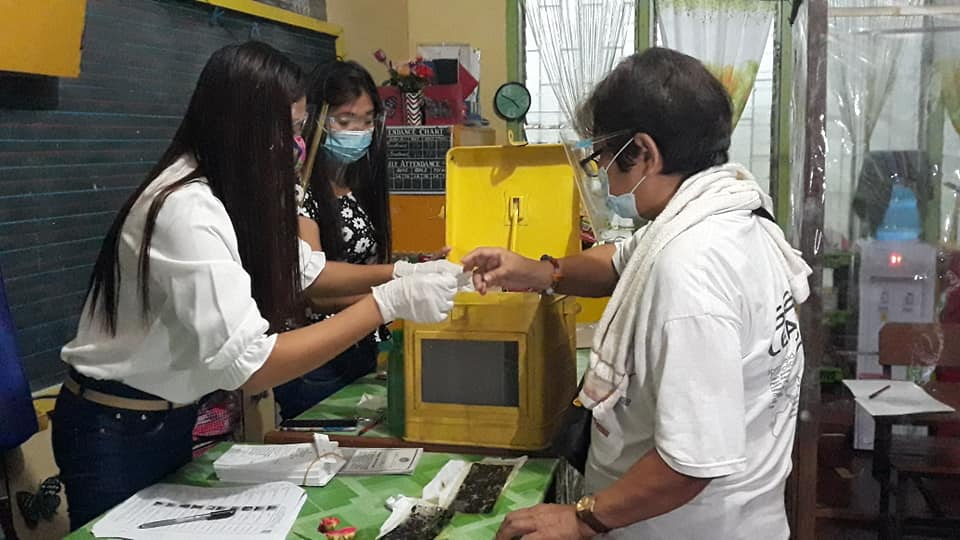
An elderly woman votes at the Narra Pilot School in Narra, Palawan on March 13, 2021

In the plebiscite, a majority of votes cast (not necessarily a majority of the registered voters) in favor was needed to ratify the law. A low voter turnout would not invalidate the result. The commission expected a low turnout due to the pandemic.

The commission declared the plebiscite a success, with the 50 to 60% turnout outperforming their 47% forecast. All voting places opened in time, except those found in Kalayaan, due to the late arrival of election paraphernalia, which was blamed on the bad weather. Instances of voter suppression in Coron, where those who were thought to vote against division were denied health declaration forms, were abetted with the intervention of the commission. The National Movement for Free Elections (NAMFREL) reported incidents of vote buying in Brooke's Point. A NAMFREL volunteer personally witnessed distribution of envelopes containing 200 pesos (US$4.12) "in exchange for people to vote a certain way in the plebiscite."

The Provincial Plebiscite Board of Canvassers convened at the Palawan Provincial Capitol in Puerto Princesa at 6:00 p.m. on plebiscite day, but adjourned 45 minutes later as it has not yet received any certificate of canvass at that time. They reconvened at 2:00 p.m. the next day to canvass results from Narra and Brooke's Point, then adjourned until 9:00 a.m. on March 15.

Do you consent to the division of the province of Palawan into three provinces?
Choice	Votes	%
For	122,223	41.50
Against	172,304	58.50
Total	294,527	100.00
Valid votes	294,527	98.92
Invalid/blank votes	3,201	1.08
Total votes	297,728	100.00
Registered voters/turnout	490,639	60.68
Source: COMELEC report to Congress and the President

- 22 out of 23 certificates of canvass

The final tally was expected to be published on March 16, 2021.

=== Per municipality ===
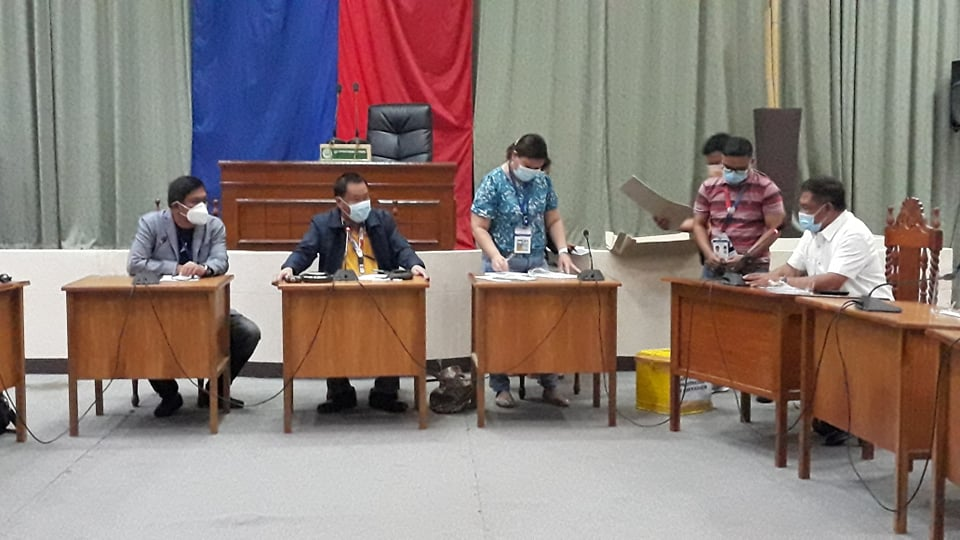
The Provincial Plebiscite Board of Canvassers convening at the session hall of the Palawan Provincial Board on March 13, 2021

The results from Kalayaan were not expected to be delivered to the Plebiscite Board of Canvassers by March 16. The board accepted the suggestion of those against division to proclaim the results as official even prior to the Kalayaan results being canvassed, as the lead of the "no" vote at that time cannot be overturned.

Results per municipality
Municipality	Yes		No		Valid votes		Invalid votes		Turnout		Registered voters
Municipality	Total	%	Total	%	Total	%	Total	%	Total	%	Registered voters
Aborlan	4,979	35.48	9,055	64.52	14,034	99.10	127	0.90	14,161	56.11	25,240
Agutaya	795	19.89	3,202	80.11	3,997	98.96	42	1.04	4,039	63.65	6,376
Araceli	1,248	23.30	4,108	76.70	5,356	98.78	66	1.22	5,422	61.29	8,846
Balabac	5,227	47.60	5,755	52.40	10,982	100.00	0	0.00	10,982	54.07	20,309
Bataraza	21,604	72.82	8,065	27.18	29,669	98.76	372	1.24	30,041	61.95	48,491
Brooke's Point	11,816	49.53	12,042	50.47	23,858	98.68	320	1.32	24,178	60.53	39,943
Busuanga	1,784	20.21	7,045	79.79	8,829	99.19	72	0.81	8,901	63.00	14,129
Cagayancillo	2,085	71.43	834	28.57	2,919	99.12	26	0.88	2,945	67.70	4,350
Coron	4,710	23.40	15,416	76.60	20,126	97.85	442	2.15	20,568	59.36	34,651
Culion	4,329	51.01	4,158	48.99	8,487	98.64	117	1.36	8,604	72.87	11,807
Cuyo	1,733	21.58	6,297	78.42	8,030	99.47	43	0.53	8,073	65.64	12,298
Dumaran	2,544	32.13	5,375	67.87	7,919	98.80	96	1.20	8,015	62.65	12,793
El Nido	6,454	35.18	11,891	64.82	18,345	98.76	231	1.24	18,576	69.33	26,792
Kalayaan (Note: Not included in the tally.)	20	32.79	41	67.21	61	96.83	2	3.17	63	22.42	281
Linapacan	1,847	35.04	3,424	64.96	5,271	98.27	93	1.73	5,364	58.10	9,233
Magsaysay	1,174	25.28	3,470	74.72	4,644	99.53	22	0.47	4,666	67.40	6,923
Narra	6,983	29.29	16,861	70.71	23,844	99.53	113	0.47	23,957	65.50	36,578
Quezon	6,311	37.20	10,655	62.80	16,966	98.83	200	1.17	17,166	53.50	32,083
Rizal	7,351	57.56	5,420	42.44	12,771	98.72	166	1.28	12,937	54.13	23,902
Roxas	9,582	43.47	12,459	56.53	22,041	99.31	154	0.69	22,195	60.45	36,175
San Vicente	5,184	44.68	6,418	55.32	11,602	98.72	151	1.28	11,753	63.19	18,600
Sofronio Española	3,827	41.83	5,323	58.17	9,150	99.25	69	0.75	9,219	47.46	19,426
Taytay	10,656	41.48	15,031	58.52	25,687	98.93	279	1.07	25,966	63.75	40,734
Palawan	122,223	41.50	172,304	58.50	294,527	98.92	3,201	1.08	297,728	60.73	490,219

The predominantly tourist towns of El Nido and Coron saw the "no" votes having a wide lead against the "yes" votes". Brooke's Point, seen to be a stronghold for the pro-division camp as it is chosen to be the capital of Palawan del Sur, saw the "no" votes narrowly eking out against the "yes" votes. In the town of Kalayaan in the disputed Spratly Islands, only 63 out of the 281 registered voters voted in the plebiscite, with the "no" votes outnumbering the "yes" votes.

=== Per proposed province ===
The measure was rejected in all of the three proposed provinces.

Results per proposed province
Proposed province	Yes		No		Valid votes
Proposed province	Total	%	Total	%	Valid votes
Palawan del Norte	29,780	34.33	56,965	65.67	86,745
Palawan del Sur	68,098	48.20	73,176	51.80	141,274
Palawan Oriental	24,345	36.60	42,163	63.40	66,508
Palawan	122,223	41.50	172,304	58.50	294,527

=== Per congressional district ===
While the measure was rejected in all three congressional districts of Palawan, it was closest in the 2nd district, with the "no" vote leading by just 1,002 votes or 0.78%.

Results per congressional district
District	Yes		No		Valid votes
District	Total	%	Total	%	Valid votes
1st district	54,145	35.32	99,169	64.68	153,314
2nd district	63,119	49.61	64,121	50.39	127,240
3rd district (Note: Excluding the independent city of Puerto Princesa.)	4,979	35.48	9,055	64.52	14,034
Palawan	122,223	41.50	172,304	58.50	294,527

== Aftermath ==
Palawan Provincial Board member Ryan Maminta and Brooke's Point mayor Jean Feliciano conceded the loss of the "yes" vote the day after the election. By Monday, Palawan governor Jose Alvarez, seen as the prime proponent of the division, conceded the loss of the cause, saying that it was the loss of the people of Palawan and not of the provincial government as the law was created for them (the people). He further said that the result had to be accepted and that they would not ask for a recount.

Bishop Socrates Mesiona of the Apostolic Vicarate of Puerto Princesa said that "[t]he people have spoken and they must be listened to through deep respect for the sanctity of ballots."

In the Senate, Senator Richard Gordon cautioned the Senate in creating any more provinces, while Sonny Angara, who sponsored the bill in the Senate as the chairman on the Committee on Local Government, said that the measure was "hotly debated" when it was being tackled, but he was surprised by the results. Senate Minority Leader Franklin Drilon said that "part of the system, and we should continue with the system because it's good for our democracy."

Presidential Spokesperson Harry Roque said that the national government respects "the sovereign decision made by the people of Palawan."

In the ensuing gubernatorial election in 2022, Vice Governor Victorino Dennis Socrates defeated former governor Mario Joel Reyes. Reyes was then disqualified by the Commission on Elections in 2023 for being a fugitive, solidifying Socrates' victory; Reyes has a pending case over the killing of journalist Gerry Ortega. Alvarez, who was term-limited, won as representative from the 2nd district, defeating incumbent Beng Abueg. Alvarez and Socrates supported each other in the election.

== See also ==
- 2001 Autonomous Region in Muslim Mindanao expansion and inclusion plebiscite, the last plebiscite held in Palawan, in which the province overwhelmingly rejected inclusion in the expanded Autonomous Region in Muslim Mindanao
- 2008 Quezon del Sur creation plebiscite, a plebiscite that rejected the proposed division of Quezon into two smaller provinces
- Sugbuak, a failed 2007 proposal to divide the province of Cebu into four smaller provinces
