= Bugsuk =

Island in Balabac, Palawan, Philippines

Geography
- Coordinates: 8°15′20″N 117°18′25″E
- Archipelago: Balabac Group of Islands
- Adjacent to: Balabac Strait; Sulu Sea
- Area: 119 km^{2} (46 sq mi)
- Length: 17 km (10.6 mi)
- Width: 9.5 km (5.9 mi)

Administration
- Philippines
- Region: Mimaropa
- Province: Palawan
- Municipality: Balabac
- Barangays: Bugsuk; Sebaring

Bugsuk is an island in the Balabac municipality of Palawan province in the Philippines. Its area is 119 square kilometres (46 sq mi).

== History ==
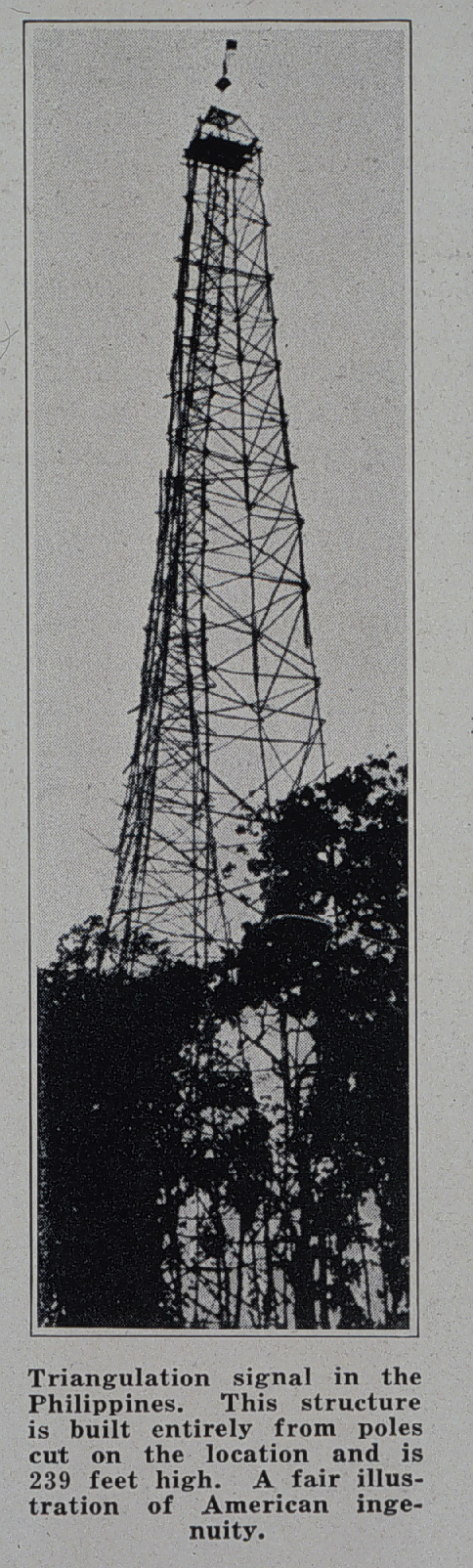
239-foot tower built on Bugsuk Island.

Eight crew members of the USS Flier reached Bugsuk Island after their submarine struck a mine on August 13, 1944, while on surface patrol during World War II. The survivors, who had been on deck and in the conning tower when the explosion occurred, swam 18 hours to reach an atoll near Bugsuk. Over the next three days, they swam to two other islands before landing on Bugsuk and being helped by Filipino guerrillas, led by Nazario B. Mayor. Seventy-eight men died on the Flier, including seven who escaped the sub but didn't survive the swim.

In 1972, San Miguel Corporation under Danding Cojuangco was awarded lands in Bugsuk island as part of a deal with the administration of president Ferdinand Marcos Sr. as part of an agrarian reform program. In exchange the SMC ceded lands to the government in other parts of the country. The SMC developed a coconut plantation. This caused a land dispute between the SMC and the indigenous people who insist on ancestral domain claims.

On December 18, 2024, the Sandiganbayan junked the last 6 civil cases on the Coco Levy Fund scam, which included the accusation that the acquisition of San Miguel Corp. of lands in Bugsuk came from the Coco Levy Fund.

== Geography ==
Most of Bugsuk island is under barangay Bugsuk of Balabac municipality. The southern tip is under barangay Sebaring. This part of the island also host Punta Sebaring, a white sand beach.

== Demographics ==
The Cagayanen and Molbog indigenous peoples have lived in the island.

== Transportation ==
Bugsuk has a 3-kilometre (3,000 m) runway developed by the San Miguel Corporation.

== See also ==
- Mariahangin
