= Bugsuk Airport =

- IATA: none; ICAO: none

Summary
- Airport type: Public
- Location: Balabac, Palawan, Philippines
- Coordinates: 08°13′29″N 117°19′25″E
- Interactive map of Bugsuk Airport

Runways
Direction	Length		Surface
Direction	ft	m	Surface
	9,842.52	3,000

Bugsuk Airport is a planned airport in Bugsuk island in the municipality of Balabac, Palawan in the Philippines.

== History ==
San Miguel Corporation (SMC) is a titleholder of 7,000 hectares (17,000 acres) of land in Bugsuk island of Balabac town in Palawan since 1974. The Molbog indigenous people have attempted acquiring the land insisting it is within scope of the government's Land Reform Program. The Department of Agriculture in 2023 ruled that the lands are not subject to agrarian reform.

SMC developed a runway in the area to support a failed experimental coconut plantation where fruit varieties from Malaysia and Africa are to be cultivated. The runway is now being developed into a commercial airport under the name "Bugsuk International Airport". As of 2022, there is no terminal building yet but already serves chartered flights to Balabac.

The facility has a 3 kilometres (1.9 mi) runway and is intended to support SMC's proposed beach resort development.
