= Catagupan Airport =

- IATA: none; ICAO: none

Summary
- Airport type: Public / Military
- Location: Balabac, Palawan, Philippines
- Coordinates: 08°00′29″N 116°59′23″E
- Interactive map of Catagupan Airport

Runways
Direction	Length		Surface
Direction	ft	m	Surface
	9,842.52	3,000

A joint-use airport being constructed in Balabac, Palawan, in the Philippines. Upon its completion it will be operated by the Philippine Air Force and the Palawan provincial government.

== History ==
A memorandum of agreement was signed in July 2018 between Palawan governor Jose Alvarez and Philippine Air Force commanding general Galileo Gerard Kintanar Jr. where it was agreed that a military base will be set up in barangay Catagupan located in the municipality of Balabac in the island of the same name for the security of the Philippines' southern border. By November 2018 clearing operations was already being conducted on site with construction expecting to begin in 2019.

The project was funded under the Department of National Defense and Department of Public Works and Highways's Tatag ng Imprastraktura Para sa Kapayapaan and Seguridad (TIKAS) program which began in 2017.

Construction of the "Balabac Military Runway" began in 2019. By October 2020, the facility was 41.25 percent complete. Ancestral domain claims in the vicinity was an issue during construction.

In 2023, the Balabac site was named among the military installations that the United States will be given access to under the Enhanced Defense Cooperation Agreement (EDCA). It was clarified that already ongoing construction works on the site is not related to EDCA. By July 2024, construction was 89 percent complete.

== Facilities ==
The Balabac airport upon its completion will be jointly used by the Philippine Air Force and the Palawan provincial government.

The runway is 3 kilometers (1.9 mi) long and is meant to serve both military and civilian aircraft. The airport covers an area of 300 hectares (740 acres). It was described by the Palawan provincial government as "Airbus capable".

It will be the second airport serving Balabac after Bugsuk International Airport.
