= COVID-19 pandemic in Mimaropa =

Ongoing COVID-19 viral pandemic in Mimaropa, the Philippines

- Disease: COVID-19
- Pathogen: SARS-CoV-2
- Location: Mimaropa
- First outbreak: Wuhan, Hubei, China
- Index case: Puerto Princesa
- Arrival date: March 20, 2020 (6 years, 1 month and 4 weeks)
- Confirmed cases: 48,267
- Active cases: 60
- Recovered: 46,904
- Deaths: 1,303

Government website
- mimaropa.doh.gov.ph

The COVID-19 pandemic in Mimaropa is part of the worldwide pandemic of coronavirus disease 2019 (COVID-19) caused by severe acute respiratory syndrome coronavirus 2 (SARS-CoV-2). The virus reached Mimaropa on March 20, 2020, when the first case of the disease was confirmed in Puerto Princesa.

== Timeline ==
The first COVID-19 case in Mimaropa was confirmed on March 20. The case involved a 26-year-old male Australian tourist in Palawan who had already left the province at the time of confirmation. The tourist arrived in Manila on March 5 before taking a flight to Puerto Princesa. The man stayed for five days in a resort in San Vicente prior to seeking medical consultation after he exhibited symptoms. He was brought to the Palawan Provincial Hospital in Puerto Princesa for sample collection for testing on March 14. The tourist managed to secure clearance after two days to take a "mercy flight" to get out of the province to Clark after his fever subsided.

Marinduque confirmed its first case on March 23, that of a case of resident of Torrijos who came to the province on March 14 from Metro Manila.

The first case of Occidental Mindoro was confirmed on March 27 in the town of San Jose which involved an 84-year-old man who died at the San Jose District Hospital on March 22, on the same day the patient was admitted. The first case in Oriental Mindoro on the other hand, that of a 1-year-old girl tested in Calapan, was also confirmed in the same day.

Romblon's first case was that of a German national in San Jose who had no recent travel history outside the country but has visited Metro Manila. The patient was confirmed to have tested positive for COVID-19 on March 28 and was admitted to a hospital in Aklan province in Western Visayas.

In June 2020, cases were recorded in Palawan, outside the independent city of Puerto Princesa. Cases have been reported among previously stranded individuals who've since returned to their hometowns in Coron and Sofronio Española.

== Impact ==
The plebiscite to ratify legislation that proposes the partition of Palawan into three smaller provinces scheduled for May 2020 was delayed due to the COVID-19 pandemic. The province provincial legislature has called for a special session and is expected to pass a resolution allowing Governor Jose Alvarez to ask the COMELEC to postpone the plebiscite. Anti-partition advocacy group One Palawan has also called for the postponement of the plebiscite reasoning the ₱80 million ($1.6 million) budget allocated for the plebiscite could be used to fund the provincial government's efforts against COVID-19.

== Response ==
The whole of Mimaropa region was included under the enhanced community quarantine (ECQ) imposed on Luzon. Quarantine measure in the region was downgraded to general community quarantine (GCQ) on May 1. However the town of San Jose, Occidental Mindoro remained under ECQ until at least May 15 even as the rest of the province downgraded to GCQ.
