= Mangsee Islands =

- Location within Philippines

Geography
- Location: Balabac Strait
- Coordinates: 07°30′36.8″N 117°18′37.7″E
- Archipelago: Balabac Group of Islands
- Adjacent to: South China Sea; Sulu Sea

Administration
- Philippines
- Region: Mimaropa
- Province: Palawan
- Municipality: Balabac

Demographics
- Population: 8,822 (2022)

Mangsee
- Barangay
- Interactive map of Mangsee
- Location within Palawan in the Philippines
- Country: Philippines
- Region: Mimaropa (Region IV-B)
- Province: Palawan
- Municipality: Balabac
- Barangay: 1

Area
  - Total: 0.4 km^{2} (0.15 sq mi)

Population (2020)
  - Total: 9,016
  - Density: 23,000/km^{2} (58,000/sq mi)
- Time zone: UTC+8 (PST)

The Mangsee Islands [ˈmaŋsi] are a group of two small islands in the far southwest of the Philippines. The group comprises North Mangsee Island and South Mangsee Island, administered as a barangay within Balabac, a municipality of Palawan. Based on the 2010 Census, the population of the Mangsee Islands was 8,433. By the time of the 2015 Census, the population had grown to 9,016.

== History ==
Together with the Turtle Islands, the barangay enjoys the historical distinction of being territory that was not under Philippine administration at the time of independence in 1946. This is due to their unique history. By an international treaty concluded in 1930 between the United States (in respect of its then overseas territory, the Philippine Islands) and the United Kingdom (in respect of its then protectorate, the State of North Borneo), the two powers agreed the international boundaries between those respective territories. In that treaty the United Kingdom also accepted that the Turtle Islands as well as the Mangsee Islands were part of the Philippine archipelago and therefore under United States sovereignty. However, by a supplemental international treaty concluded at the same time, the two powers agreed that those islands, although part of the Philippine archipelago, would remain under the administration of the State of North Borneo's British North Borneo Company. The supplemental treaty provided that the British North Borneo Company would continue to administer those islands unless and until the United States government gave notice to the United Kingdom calling for administration of the islands to be transferred to the United States. The United States never gave such a notice. On 4 July 1946, the Republic of the Philippines was born. It became the successor to the United States under the treaties of 1930. On 15 July 1946, the United Kingdom annexed the State of North Borneo and, in the view of the United Kingdom, became the sovereign power with respect to what had been the State of North Borneo. On 19 September 1946, the Republic of the Philippines notified the United Kingdom that it wished to take over the administration of the Turtle Islands and the Mangsee Islands. Pursuant to a supplemental international agreement, the transfer of administration became effective on 16 October 1947.

== Geography, society, and accessibility ==
The islands and reefs are situated in the Sulu Sea at the southwestern tip of the Philippines, and access are difficult as there are no tourist means of transportation to them. The Coycoy Reef, also known as the Mangsee Great Reef, is the westernmost point of the country before and beside the Malaysia–Philippines border which is an international treaty boundary that separates the Philippines and Malaysia as such the area just after the reef where the said boundary is located is prone to illegal entry by people between two countries upon passing into it due to their very close proximity. South Mangsee Island is the larger of the two islands at just 23 square hectares. The islands are very densely populated by over 9,000 persons, mostly Muslim of the Sama and Molbog ethnicities. South Mangsee houses the bulk of inhabitants as well as government institutions such as an elementary school established in 1975. The Mangsee Islands is closer to mainland Sabah, Malaysia, than to the southernmost Palawan town of Balabac, to which it belongs as a barangay.

There have been issues with the islands' water supply: in 2000, Mangsee was hit by an epidemic killing around 200 people over two weeks, in what was believed to be cholera. As of 2012, the barangay still did not have a resident doctor. Due to the problems, most islanders seek treatment in neighbouring Banggi Island, Sabah. Smuggling to and from Malaysia, as well as fishing, are chief economic activities in Mangsee.
