= Cyrtodactylus tautbatorum =

Scientific classification
- Kingdom: Animalia
- Phylum: Chordata
- Class: Reptilia
- Order: Squamata
- Suborder: Gekkota
- Family: Gekkonidae
- Genus: Cyrtodactylus
- Species: C. tautbatorum

Binomial name
- Cyrtodactylus tautbatorum Welton, Siler, Diesmos & R. Brown, 2009

Species of lizard

Cyrtodactylus tautbatorum is a species of gecko, a lizard in the family Gekkonidae. The species is endemic to Palawan in the Philippines.

== Etymology ==
The specific name, tautbatorum, is in honor of the Tau't-Bato peoples.

== Description ==
C. tautbatorum is a small species for its genus. It has a dorsal pattern of transverse body bands which have a "bow-tie" shape. Similar species have transverse body bands which have a "dumbbell" shape.
