= Mariahangin =

Island in the Philippines

Mariahangin (Bowen)
- Interactive map of Mariahangin (Bowen)

Geography
- Location: Sulu Sea
- Coordinates: 8°20′56.6″N 117°18′50.2″E
- Archipelago: Balabac Group of Islands
- Area: 37.7812 m^{2} (406.673 sq ft)

Administration
- Philippines
- Region: Mimaropa
- Province: Palawan
- Municipality: Balabac
- Barangays: Bugsuk

Mariahangin, also known as Bowen Island, is an island in Balabac, Palawan.

== Geography ==
Mariahangin is a 37.7812-square-meter (406.673 sq ft) island. It is under barangay Bugsuk of the municipality of Balabac in Palawan.

== Demographics ==
The Molbog and Cagayanen live in the island and are concentrated in Sitio Mariahangin. They consider the island as part of their ancestral domain. They have applied for a Certificate of Ancestral Domain Title (CADT) since 2005.

At its peak, about 200 families of the Molbog and Cagayanen live in Mariahangin. As of 2025, the island serves as the residence of less than 90 families.

== Economy ==
Residents rely on fishing and agar agar farming as part of their livelihood.

== Land dispute ==
San Miguel Corporation (SMC) allegedly is trying to claim the island for its resort development project which includes the nearby larger island of Bugsuk, a claim which SMC denies. This in opposition to the Molbog and Cagayanen's ancestral domain claims. The two groups has been offered incentives to relocate allegedly by people linked to SMC.
