= Tabon Caves =

Cave system and archaeological site in Palawan, Philippines

- Mga Yungib ng Tabon
- Tabon Cave Complex
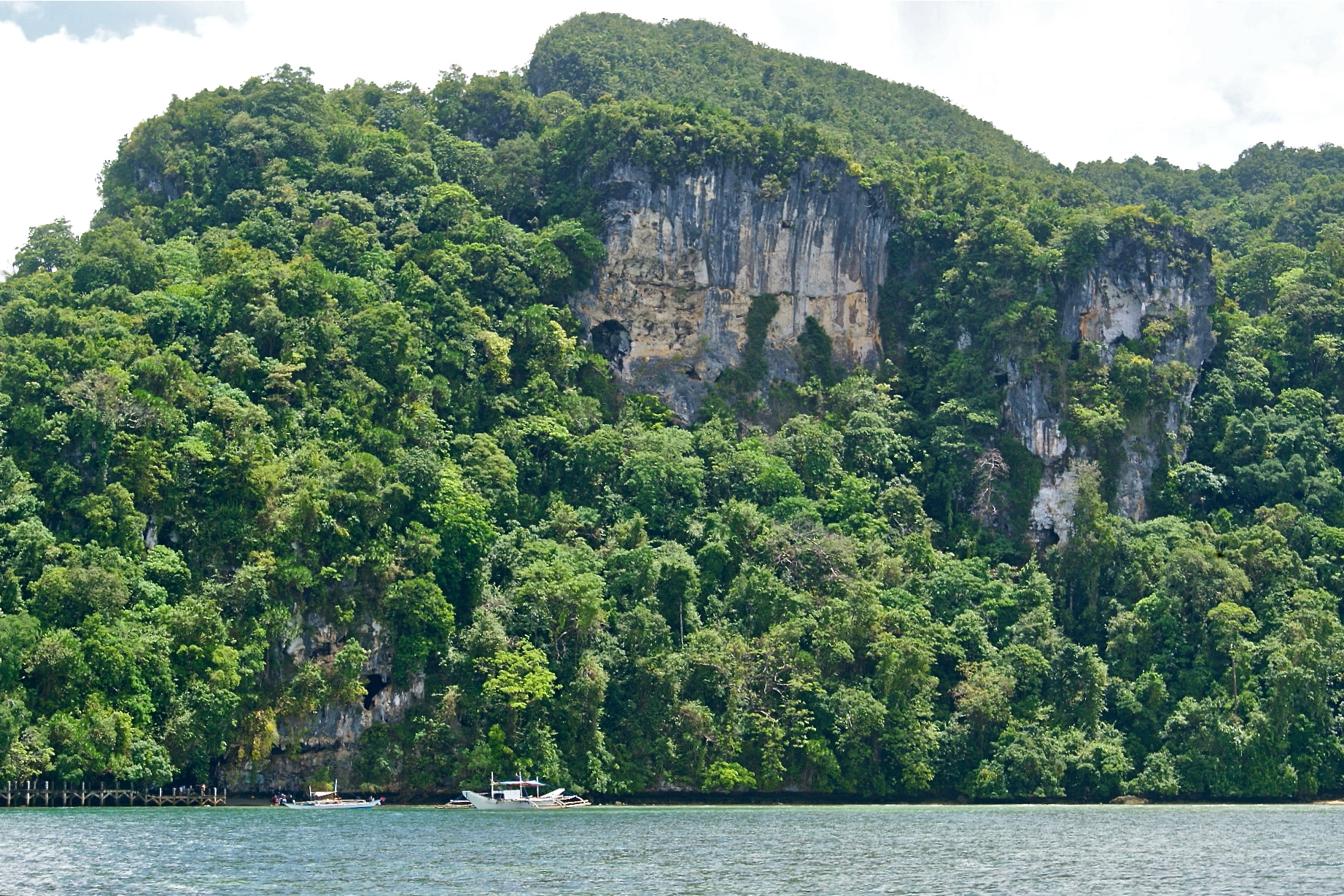

- Location of Tabon Cave in the Philippines
- 9.279882°N 117.9814°E
- Location: Quezon, Palawan, Philippines

Site notes
- Management: National Museum of the Philippines

The Tabon Caves is a cave system located in Lipuun Point, Panitian, Quezon, Palawan in the Philippines. Dubbed as the country's "cradle of civilization", it is a site of archaeological importance due to the number of jar burials and prehistoric human remains found starting from the 1960s, most notably the Tabon Man. The system is a part of the Lipuun Point Reservation, which has been protected by the Philippine government as a museum reservation to protect the caves and its immediate vicinity from deforestation and to preserve the cultural artifacts present there.

The caves are named after the Tabon scrubfowl. It is bordered on the south by the town proper of Quezon, Panitian on the west, and the South China Sea on the north and east. Out of 215 known caves, 29 have been fully explored, with seven of them publicly accessible. Other excavated, unexamined remains are stored onsite. In 2006, the site, collectively named as Tabon Cave Complex and all of Lipuun, was added to the tentative list of the Philippines for future UNESCO World Heritage Site nomination.

The complex is managed by the National Museum of the Philippines and was declared as a National Cultural Treasure by the same institution in February 2011.

== Archaeological discoveries ==
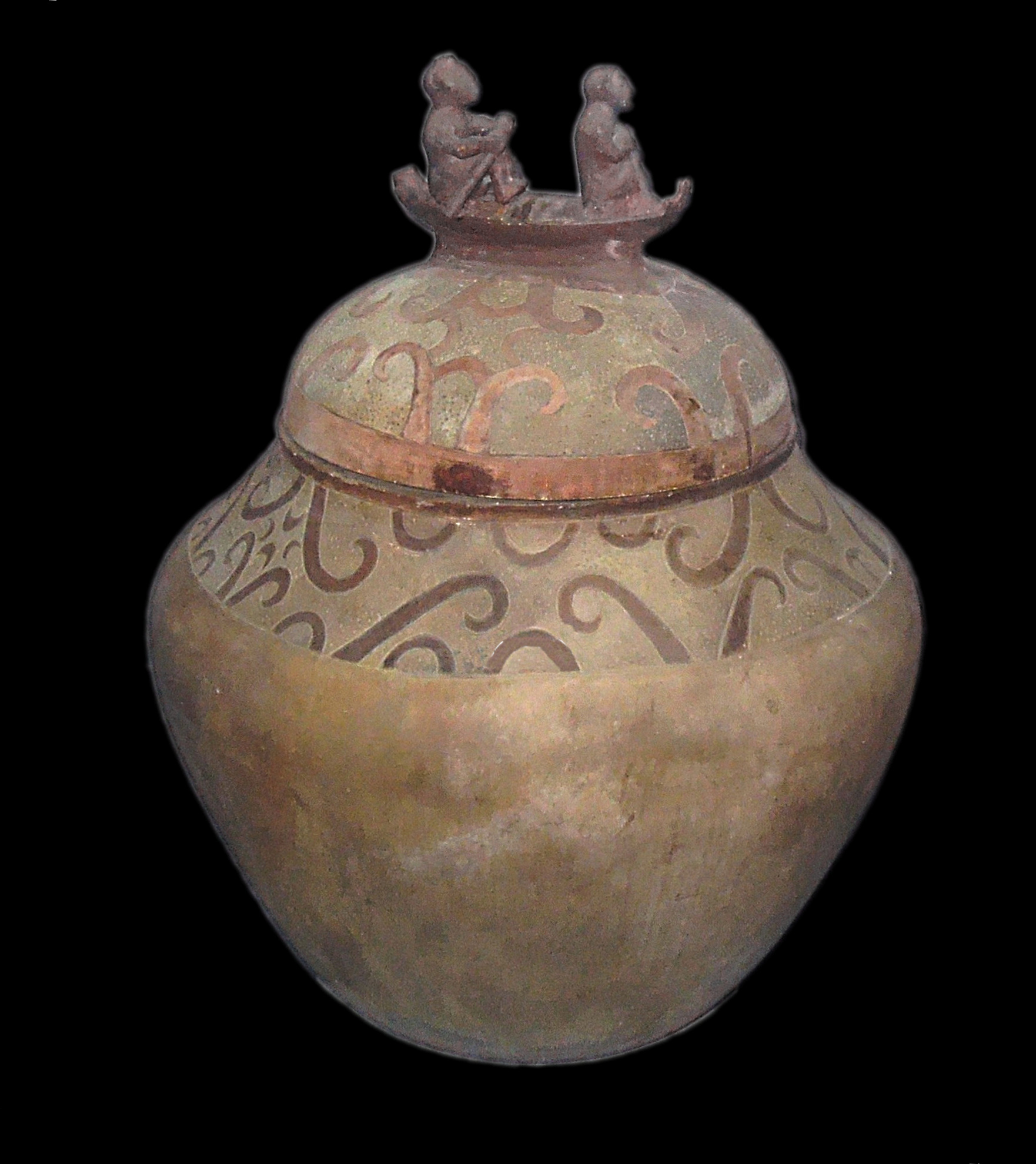
The Manunggul burial jar, one of the numerous burial jars found on the cave system.

Between 1962 and 1966, the cave system was explored and researched by Robert B. Fox together with a team from the National Museum of the Philippines. Among those discovered on the site was the Tabon Man, which is believed to be 22,000 to 24,000 years old. The team also found over 1,500 burial jars, including the Manunggul Jar, a burial jar remarkable for its near-perfect condition. Other finds included earthenware, jade ornaments and jewelry, as well as primitive stone tools, animal bones, and human fossils dating back to 47,000 years ago, the earliest human remains found in the Philippines. These discoveries indicated that the site was inhabited by early humans from at least 50,000 years ago, with the limestone formations in the site dated as being formed 25 million years ago during the Lower Middle Miocene period.

The Lipuun Point Reservation, covering a 138 ha (340 acres) island connected to the Palawan mainland by a mangrove forest, was declared a Site Museum Reservation in April 1972 and was made a priority site for tourism development in 1991 for its natural and cultural heritage.

In recent years, verification of facts in addition to further analysis of previously collected samples has allowed for a greater understanding of the site as a whole. Radioisotope dating techniques have been able to show a period of near continuous habitation from 30,000 to 9,000 years ago. Human remains as well as rock flakes, hammers, and other stone tools indicate the cave may have been used as a workshop. The bone fragments found in the caves have been suggested to have been from the late Pleistocene to early Holocene periods. Previous excavations of the site have also revealed evidence of a diet including pig and deer, which are absent in the area today.

While little new data is available because of the cave's location and safety concerns, they are slowly being excavated and the old data is being reexamined. Approximately 25% of archaeological sites in the caves have been excavated.

== Cave use ==
Earliest cave uses included inhabitation, and the factory like production of stone tools. According to a video by Dr. Fox, a jar burial period began 3000 years ago and lasted until 1500 years ago. This is evidence the area became dominated by people known as the Sa Huỳnh culture.

The Sa Huynh adorned their dead with agate, carnelian, and glass beads from India and Iran. Artifacts of this nature, including glass bracelets, were found in the cave and are displayed at the Palawan Cultural Museum in Puerto Princesa.

A migration of Sa Huyhn people to Vietnam is accepted by most experts to have been the forebears of the Cham people. These are a people still existing today that created an empire known as Champa.

History of the people in the area took on a new significance in modern times owing to the Spratly Islands dispute.

== Igang Cave findings ==
Igang is one of the upper caves and one of the longest of the complex. It appears to have been the primary burial site and most of the burial jars were found here.

== Tabon Cave wall findings ==
Tabon Cave lends its name to the complex as a whole. In this large cave with a big open chamber, researchers found artifacts indicating trade with China during the Song dynasty and the Yuan dynasty. These are now at the Philippine National Museum in Manila.

== College of Tabonology ==
In July 2015, Holy Trinity University in Puerto Princesa, Palawan was selected for the construction of a new college to studies of ancient Palawan man (Tabonology). Nearly all active research stopped after Dr. Robert B. Fox died.

== Security measures ==
The National Museum of the Philippines carefully guards the cave complex. All visitors are watched to ensure they take nothing but pictures and do not damage the cave walls. Further, all burial jars and remains have been secured.

One issue is that new research and exploration of the complex has largely ceased.

== Tabon Caves Museum ==
The National Museum of the Philippines opened of the Tabon Caves Museum at the Tabon Cave Complex and Lipuun Point in Quezon, Palawan on February 1, 2024. The inauguration was attended by Governor Victorino Dennis Socrates, 2nd District Palawan Representative Jose Alvarez, Quezon Mayor Joselito Ayala, National Museum of the Philippines Director General Jeremy R. Barns, among others.

== Gallery ==
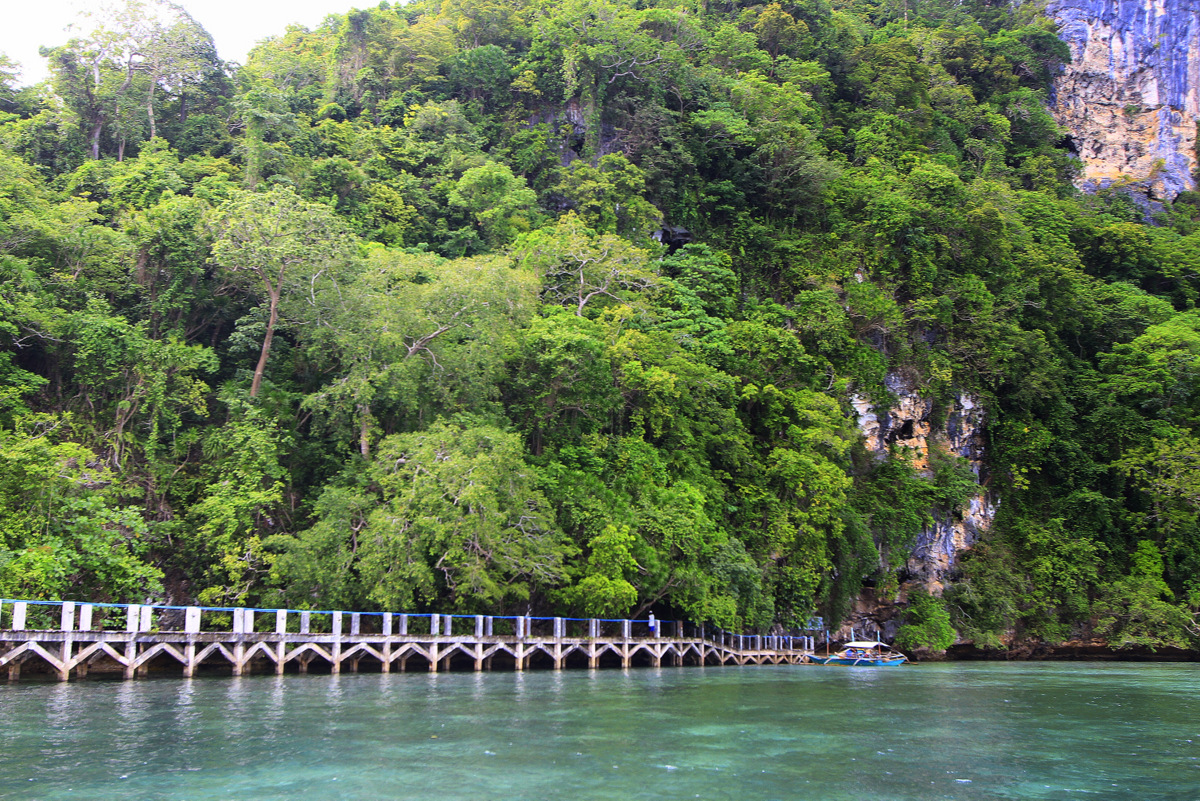
Docking station and entrance to the complex

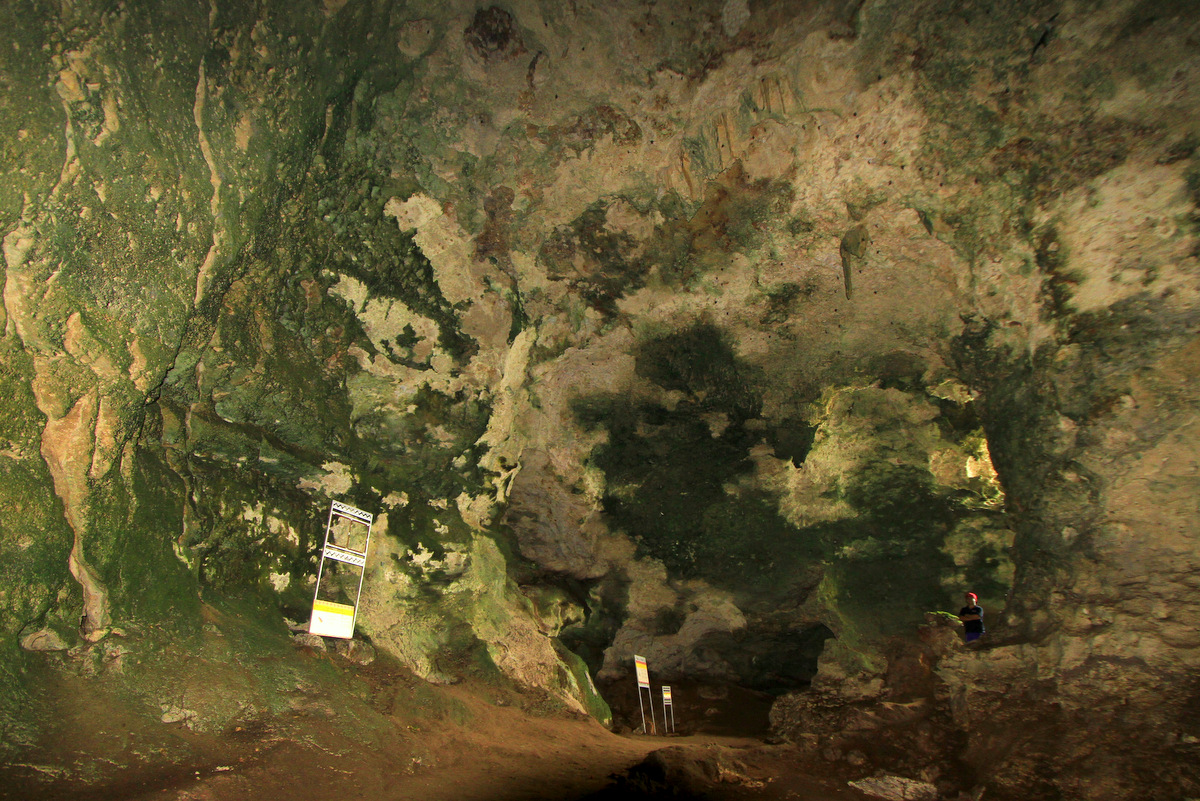
One of the chambers of the Tabon Cave Complex Site

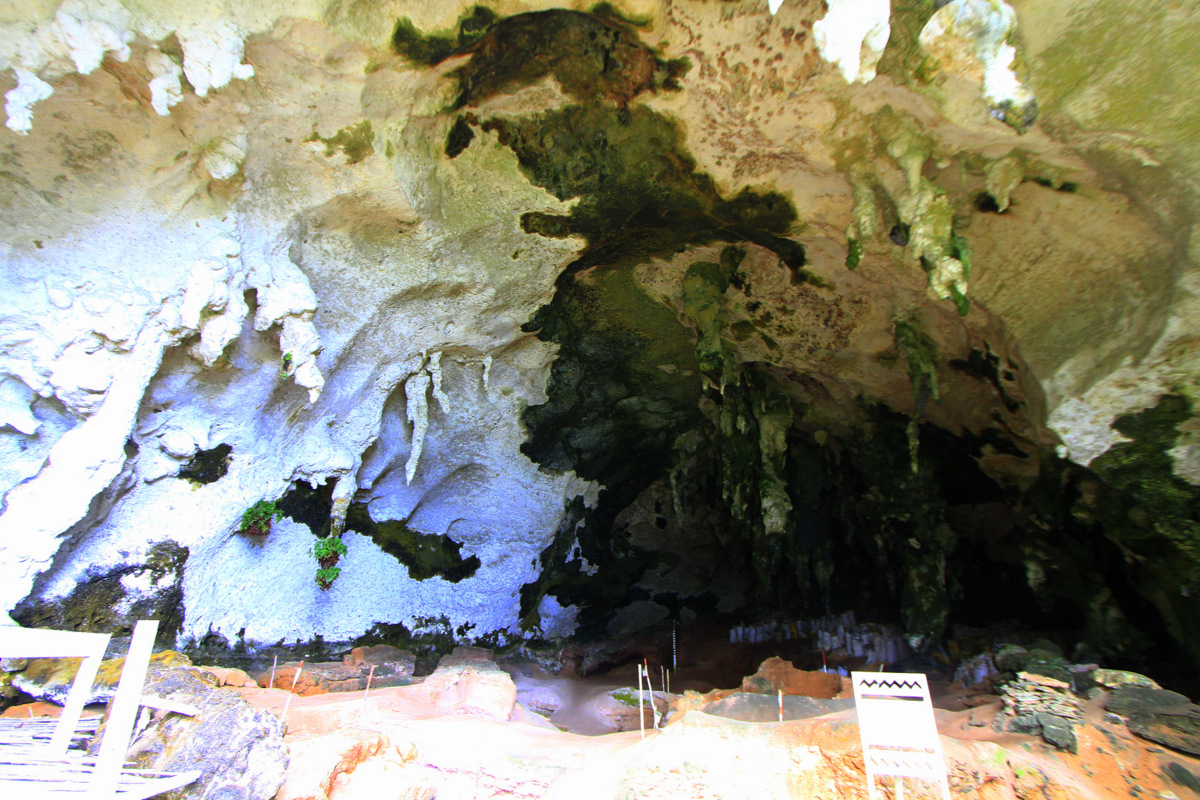
Rehabilitation works on Tabon Cave

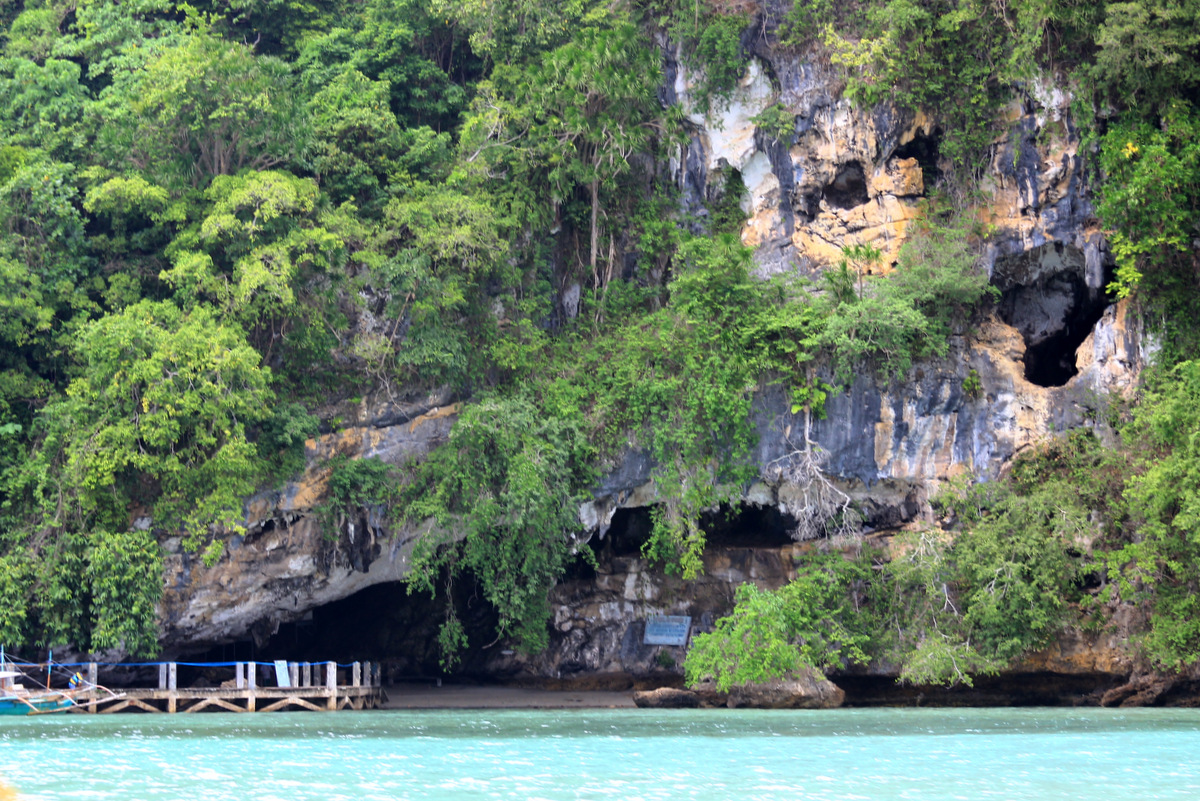
View of the site in Lipuun Point, Quezon, Palawan

Goblet 3000 years old from Leta Leta Cave
