= Beng Abueg =

Filipino lawyer and politician (born 1978)

The Honorable Beng Abueg

Member of the Philippine House of Representatives from Palawan's 2nd district
- In office June 30, 2019 – June 30, 2022
- Preceded by: Frederick Abueg
- Succeeded by: Jose Alvarez

Personal details
- Born: Cyrille Fabello Abueg; November 18, 1978 (age 47) Quezon City, Philippines
- Party: Liberal (2021–present)
- Other political affiliations: PPPL (2018–2021)
- Profession: Lawyer, politician

Cyrille "Beng" Fabello Abueg-Zaldivar (born November 18, 1978) is a Filipino lawyer and politician. She served as a member of the Philippine House of Representatives representing the 2nd District of Palawan from 2019 to 2022.

== House of Representatives ==
In the 2019 Philippine general election, she ran under the Partidong Pagbabago ng Palawan party. She ran against two other candidates. She won with 112,960 votes. She is one of the 70 lawmakers who voted to reject the franchise of ABS-CBN. She filed the "Gray Water Treatment and Reuse Act", which aims to reuse gray or dirty water.

== 2022 and 2025 elections ==
In the 2022 Philippine general election, Abueg ran under the Liberal Party in the administration slate. She openly supported the Leni Robredo 2022 presidential campaign. She lost her re-election bid to Jose Alvarez with 62,210 votes, 32.50 percent of the votes. She ran in the 2025 Philippine general election under the Liberal Party. She lost to Alvarez with 67,801 votes, 8.61 percent of the votes.

== Electoral history ==
Electoral history of Beng Abueg
Year	Office	Party	Votes received				Result
Year	Office	Party	Total	%	P.	Swing	Result
2019	Representative (Palawan–2nd)	PPPL	112,960	85.00%	1st	—N/a	Won
2022	Representative (Palawan–2nd)	Liberal	62,210	32.50%	2nd	-52.50	Lost
2025	Representative (Palawan–2nd)	Liberal	67,801	32.71%	2nd	+0.21	Lost
