= Bataraza =

Municipality in Palawan, Philippines

Bataraza باتراز
- Municipality
- Municipality of Bataraza
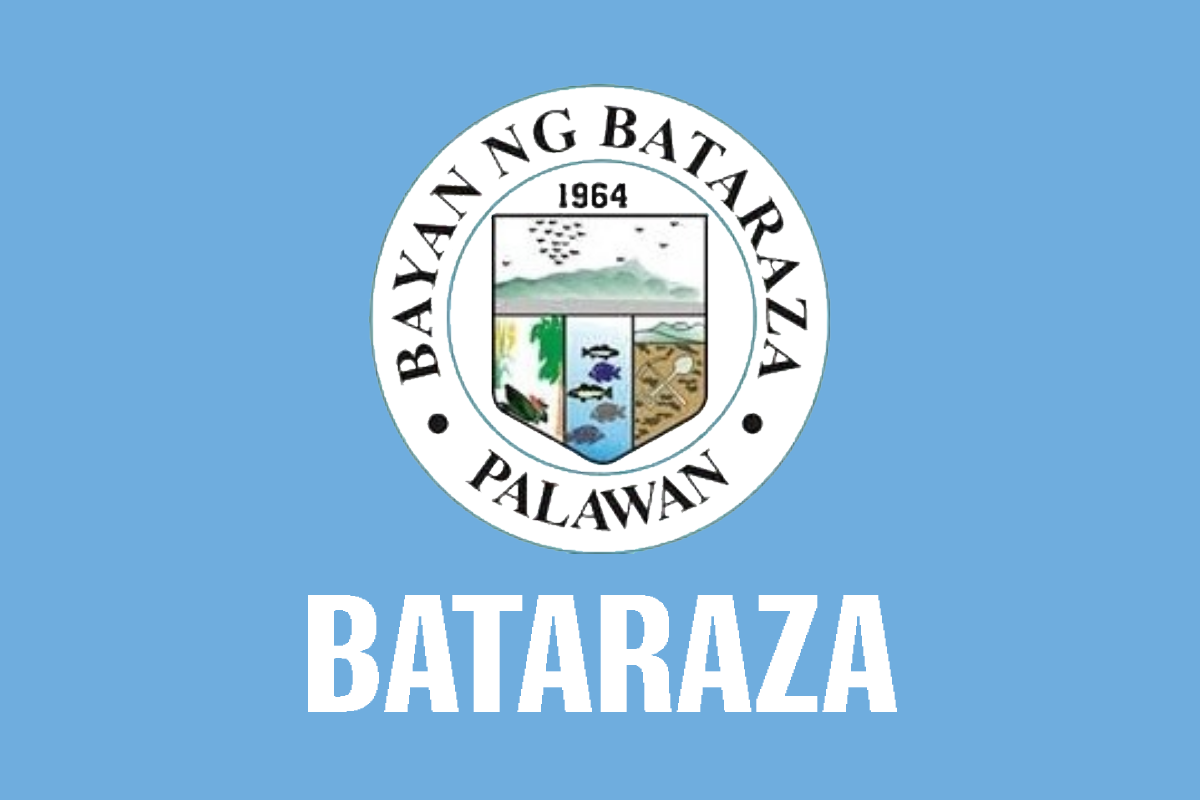
- Flag Seal
- Nicknames: Pineapple Capital of Palawan, Tip of the Isle
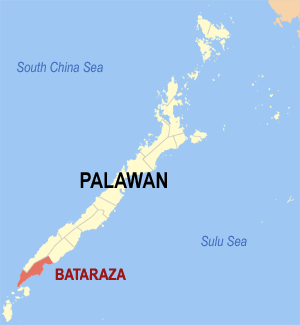
- Map of Palawan with Bataraza highlighted
- Interactive map of Bataraza
- Location within the Philippines
- Coordinates: 8°40′N 117°37′E
- Country: Philippines
- Region: Mimaropa
- Province: Palawan
- District: 2nd district
- Founded: January 1, 1964
- Named for: Datu Bataraza Narrazid
- Barangays: 22 (see Barangays)

Government
  - Type: Sangguniang Bayan
  - Mayor: Al-Shariff W. Ibba
  - Vice Mayor: Kennedy A. Jaafar
  - Representative: Jose Ch. Alvarez
  - Municipal Council: Members: Al-Shariff W. Ibba; Laurence P. Amores; McDonald R. Saiyo; Gomer L. Miano; John Emmer S. Gamo; Yusa I. Musa; Eddie N. Sagun; Lexandy B. Usop
  - Electorate: 54,456 voters (2025)

Area
  - Total: 726.20 km^{2} (280.39 sq mi)
- Elevation: 55 m (180 ft)
- Highest elevation: 614 m (2,014 ft)
- Lowest elevation: 0 m (0 ft)

Population (2024 census)
  - Total: 87,384
  - Density: 120.33/km^{2} (311.65/sq mi)
  - Households: 21,294

Economy
  - Income class: 1st municipal income class
  - Poverty incidence: 28.06% (2023)
  - Revenue: ₱ 629.6 million (2024)
  - Assets: ₱ 2,750 million (2024)
  - Expenditure: ₱ 564.3 million (2024)

Service provider
  - Electricity: Palawan Electric Cooperative (PALECO)
- Time zone: UTC+8 (PST)
- ZIP code: 5306
- PSGC: 1705305000
- IDD : area code: +63 (0)48
- Native languages: Molbog; Palawano; Tagalog

Bataraza, officially the Municipality of Bataraza (Tagalog: Bayan ng Bataraza), is a municipality in the province of Palawan, Philippines. According to the 2024 census, it has a population of 87,384 people, making it the second most populous city/town in Palawan (after Puerto Princesa).

== Etymology ==
The town was named after Datu Bataraza Narrazid who served as the father of the town. He was a locally influential Muslim chieftain and father of the town's first mayor and former mayor of Brooke's Point, then Datu Sapiodin Narrazid.

== History ==
The area that forms the present-day Bataraza was previously part of the municipality of Brooke's Point. On June 18, 1961, the barrios of Bonobono, Bulalacao, Buliluyan, Culandanum, Igang-Igang, Inogbong, Iwahig, Malihud, Malitub, Marangas, Ocayan, Puring, Rio Tuba, Sandoval, Sarong, Sapa, Sumbiling, Tabud, Tagnato, Tagolango, Taratak, and Tarusan were separated from Brooke's Point and constituted into a new municipality known as Batarasa (Bataraza), by virtue of Republic Act No. 3425. The law took effect on January 1, 1964, following the election of its first municipal officials in November 1963.

== Geography ==
Bataraza is located on the southernmost tip of Palawan Island, 218 kilometres (135 mi) from Puerto Princesa City. It has total land area of 957 km^{2} (369 sq mi).

Bataraza is situated some 775 kilometers (480 mi) south-west of Manila, between roughly 8.3 and 8.75 degrees latitude north of the equator. It stretches approximately 80 kilometers (50 mi) in north-easterly to south-westerly direction along the Sulu Sea, from the Malis River to Cape Buliluyan in the south. On the western side, it extends up to Wangly River.

It is bounded in the east by the Sulu Sea, in the west by a great mountain range, extending from Mount Mantalingahan (the highest peak of the province) to Mount Malitub, which serves as the divider between Bataraza and Rizal, and in the south-west by the South China Sea.

=== Barangays ===
Bataraza is politically subdivided into 22 barangays. Each barangay consists of puroks and some have sitios.

- Bono-Bono
- Bulalacao
- Buliluyan
- Culandanum
- Igang-Igang
- Inogbong
- Iwahig
- Malihud
- Malitub
- Marangas (Poblacion)
- Ocayan
- Puring
- Rio Tuba
- Sandoval
- Sapa
- Sarong
- Sumbiling
- Tabud
- Tagnato
- Tagolango
- Taratak
- Tarusan (Bulosan)

Rio Tuba is one of the populated barangays of Bataraza and known for its nickel mineral reserves. The primary mine site of Rio Tuba Nickel Mining Corporation is located within its jurisdiction.

=== Climate ===
Climate data for Bataraza, Palawan
Month	Jan	Feb	Mar	Apr	May	Jun	Jul	Aug	Sep	Oct	Nov	Dec	Year
Mean daily maximum °C (°F)	30 (86)	31 (88)	31 (88)	31 (88)	30 (86)	30 (86)	30 (86)	29 (84)	29 (84)	29 (84)	29 (84)	30 (86)	30 (86)
Mean daily minimum °C (°F)	23 (73)	23 (73)	23 (73)	24 (75)	25 (77)	25 (77)	25 (77)	25 (77)	25 (77)	25 (77)	24 (75)	24 (75)	24 (76)
Average precipitation mm (inches)	64 (2.5)	55 (2.2)	90 (3.5)	93 (3.7)	169 (6.7)	215 (8.5)	206 (8.1)	181 (7.1)	190 (7.5)	219 (8.6)	182 (7.2)	115 (4.5)	1,779 (70.1)
Average rainy days	13.1	15.1	17.3	19.4	26.8	26.8	27.8	26.9	27.1	28.3	25.4	20.1	274.1
Source: Meteoblue

== Demographics ==
Population census of Bataraza

Year	Pop.	±% p.a.
1970	10,176	—
1975	15,510	+8.82%
1980	17,973	+2.99%
1990	29,142	+4.95%
1995	33,303	+2.53%
2000	41,458	+4.81%

Year	Pop.	±% p.a.
2007	53,430	+3.56%
2010	63,644	+6.57%
2015	75,468	+3.30%
2020	85,439	+2.65%
2024	87,384	+0.54%

Source: Philippine Statistics Authority

In the 2024 census, the population of Bataraza was 87,384 people, with a density of 120 inhabitants per square kilometre or 310 inhabitants per square mile.

=== Religion ===
Religiously, it is estimated that the population of Bataraza is divided into 35% Roman Catholic, 23% Islam, and 23% tribal religions, with another 19% unspecified, most likely followers of Islam, as well as Roman Catholic or other Christian sects. However, based on the percentage of religion in 2024, the majority of the population is Islam (62.8%), then Christianity (36.1%), and others (1.1%). The majority of Muslims are indigenous peoples of Molbog and Palawano, as well as Tausug and other migrants. Then Christianity and other religions were mainly practiced by Tagalog settlers and other Luzon origins, as well as the native population of Palawano.

== Economy ==
Poverty incidence of Bataraza (%)

Source: Philippine Statistics Authority

Main industries of Bataraza includes farming, fishing, and nickel mining and processing.

== Culture ==
The Molbog people dominate part of the municipality of Bataraza, as well as the municipality of Balabac in the south. The area constitute the homeland of the Molbog people since the classical era prior to Spanish colonization. The Molbog are known to have a strong connection with the natural world, especially with the sacred pilandok (Philippine mouse-deer), which can only be found in the Balabac islands. A Muslim tale tells the Philippine mouse-deer once tricked a prince into giving up his bag of gold and facing a hive of angry bees. Another tale depicts him as a clever guardian of the environment, using his wisdom as an advantage against those who destroy forests, seas, and wildlife. The coconut is especially important in Molbog culture at it is their most prized agricultural crop. Here also stands the largest mosque in Palawan, the Bataraza Grand Mosque which can accommodate about 2,000 people, established in 2020, near Saipodin Port.

== Education ==
There are two schools district offices which govern all educational institutions within the municipality. They oversee the management and operations of all private and public, from primary to secondary schools. These are the Bataraza District I Schools District, and Bataraza District II Schools District.

=== Primary and elementary school ===
- Alfredo Gregorio Memorial Elementary School
- Biriran Elementary School
- Barakbarakan Elementary School
- Barangkas Elementary School
- Bataraza Central School
- Bato-Bato Elementary School
- Bono-Bono Elementary School
- Bulalacao Elementary School
- Buliluyan Elementary School
- Culandanum Elementary School
- Dudungguan Elementary School
- Gotok Elementary School
- Guimba Malitub Elementary School
- Igang-Igang Elementary School
- Irene E. Sibullas Memorial Elementary School
- Kamunungan Elementary School
- Katipunan Elementary School
- Leonides S. Virata Memorial School
- Linao Elementary School
- Lupak Elementary School
- Malihud Elementary School
- Malitub Elementary School
- Marangas West Elementary School
- Matyag Elementary School
- Narra-Narra Elementary School
- Ocayan Elementary School
- Pajo Elementary School
- Panas Elementary School
- Pinuwasan Elementary School
- Puring Elementary School
- Rio Tuba Central School
- Rio Tuba Christian Academy
- Rio Tuba South Elementary School
- Rogelio Verano Esteban Elementary School
- Sandoval Elementary School
- Sapa Elementary School
- Saray Elementary School
- Sarong Elementary School
- Sayab II Elementary School
- Sitio Culandanum Elementary School
- Sumbiling Elementary School
- Tabud Elementary School
- Tagmaya Elementary School
- Tagnato Elementary School
- Tagolango Elementary School
- Taratak Elementary School
- Tarusan Elementary School
- Taysay Elementary School

=== Secondary schools ===
- Amando Carlos Lahoz National High School
- Bataraza National High School
- Buliluyan National High School
- Leonides S. Virata Memorial School
- Malihud National High School
- Peace and Development Community National High School
- Rio Tuba National High School
- Sarong National High School
- Southern Bataraza National High School
- Sumbiling National High School
- Tarusan National High School
