= Quezon, Palawan =

Municipality in Palawan, Philippines

Quezon Tabon
- Municipality
- Municipality of Quezon
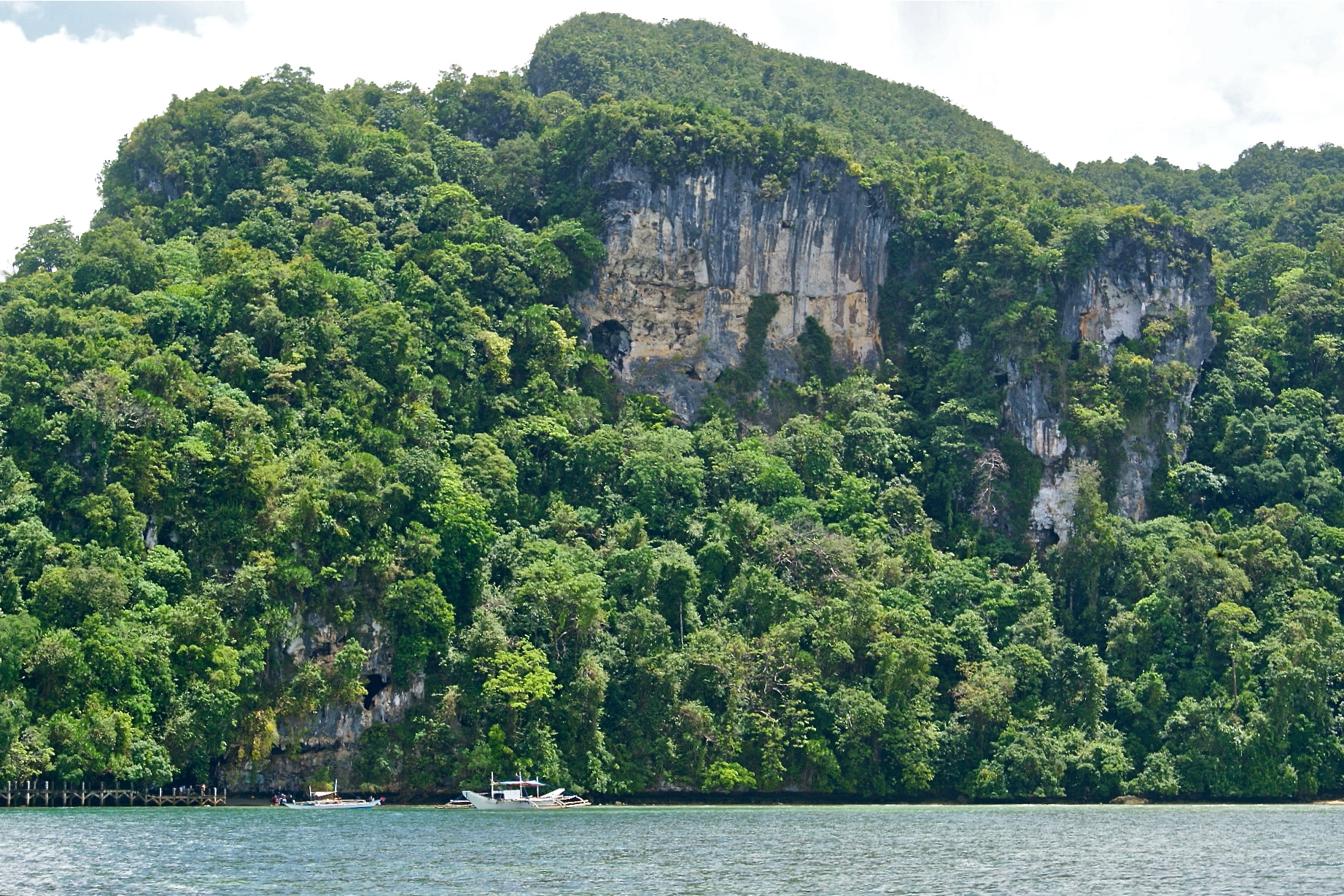
- Tabon Cave

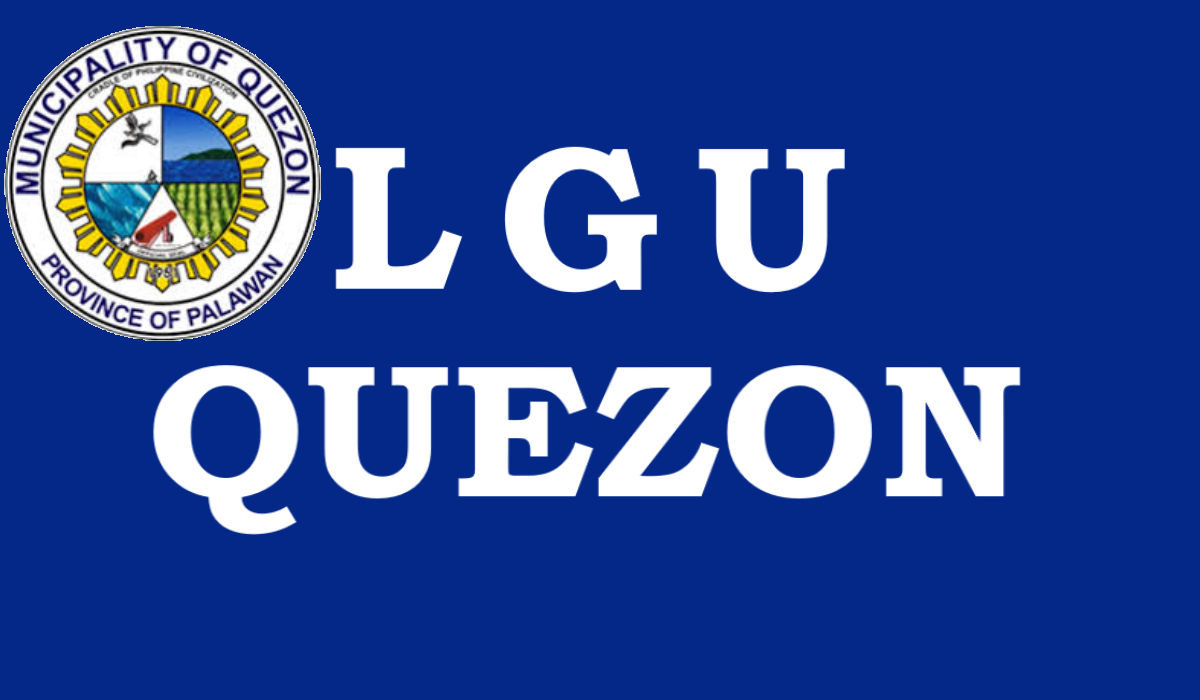
- Flag

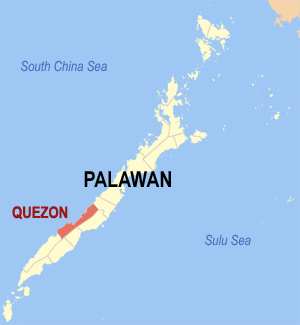
- Map of Palawan with Quezon highlighted
- Interactive map of Quezon
- Location within the Philippines
- Coordinates: 9°14′06″N 117°59′48″E
- Country: Philippines
- Region: Mimaropa
- Province: Palawan
- District: 2nd district
- Founded: May 15, 1951
- Named for: Manuel L. Quezon
- Barangays: 14 (see Barangays)

Government
  - Type: Sangguniang Bayan
  - Mayor: Lily G. Torrico
  - Vice Mayor: Leonard Vincent C. Ayod
  - Representative: Jose Ch. Alvarez
  - Municipal Council: Members: Victor Emmanuel L. Catingub; Elson T. Rayoso; Teodoro C. Medina; Ethel E. Olid; Eugene C. Ayod; Rogelio C. Lauros; Marife A. Alcantara; Mohammad Jonair C. Bayabao
  - Electorate: 39,152 voters (2025)

Area
  - Total: 943.19 km^{2} (364.17 sq mi)
- Elevation: 45 m (148 ft)
- Highest elevation: 404 m (1,325 ft)
- Lowest elevation: 0 m (0 ft)

Population (2024 census)
  - Total: 68,532
  - Density: 72.660/km^{2} (188.19/sq mi)
  - Households: 16,206

Economy
  - Income class: 1st municipal income class
  - Poverty incidence: 32.24% (2023)
  - Revenue: ₱ 491.9 million (2024)
  - Assets: ₱ 1,570 million (2024)
  - Expenditure: ₱ 399.8 million (2024)
  - Liabilities: ₱ 372.8 million (2024)

Service provider
  - Electricity: Palawan Electric Cooperative (PALECO)
- Time zone: UTC+8 (PST)
- ZIP code: 5304
- PSGC: 1705317000
- IDD : area code: +63 (0)48
- Native languages: Central Tagbanwa; Palawano; Taaw't Bato; Tagalog

Quezon, officially the Municipality of Quezon (Tagalog: Bayan ng Quezon), is a municipality in the province of Palawan, Philippines. According to the 2024 census, it has a population of 68,532 people.

It is home to the Tabon Caves, where the remains of the Tabon Man were discovered. A population of the critically-endangered Irrawaddy dolphin can also be found in the municipality's waters.

== History ==
In the past, the municipality was named Tabon, but now it is a barangay of Quezon that discovered and found the Manunggul Jar. The old municipality (Tabon) was popular and derived from the name of the Tabon bird.

The Municipality of Quezon was created in 1951 from the barrios of Berong and Alfonso XIII from Aborlan and the barrios of Iraan, Candawaga and Canipaan from Brooke's Point.

In 1957, the sitios of Aramaywan, Isugod, Tabon, Sawangan, Calumpang, Campong-Ulay, Ransang, Cadawaga, Culasian, Panalingaan, Taburi, Latud and Canipaan were converted into barrios.

By virtue of Batas Pambansa Blg. 386, the municipality of Marcos was separated from Quezon on April 14, 1983 before being renamed in 1988 as Rizal.

== Geography ==
Quezon is 146 kilometres (91 mi) from Puerto Princesa.

=== Barangays ===
Quezon is politically subdivided into 14 barangays. Each barangay consists of puroks and some have sitios.

- Panitian
- Alfonso XIII (Poblacion)
- Aramaywan
- Berong
- Calumpang
- Isugod
- Kalatagbak
- Maasin
- Malatgao
- Pinaglabanan
- Quinlogan
- Sowangan
- Tabon
- Tagusao

=== Climate ===
Climate data for Quezon, Palawan
Month	Jan	Feb	Mar	Apr	May	Jun	Jul	Aug	Sep	Oct	Nov	Dec	Year
Mean daily maximum °C (°F)	29 (84)	30 (86)	31 (88)	31 (88)	30 (86)	30 (86)	29 (84)	29 (84)	29 (84)	29 (84)	29 (84)	29 (84)	30 (85)
Mean daily minimum °C (°F)	23 (73)	23 (73)	24 (75)	25 (77)	25 (77)	25 (77)	25 (77)	25 (77)	25 (77)	25 (77)	24 (75)	24 (75)	24 (76)
Average precipitation mm (inches)	85 (3.3)	69 (2.7)	100 (3.9)	105 (4.1)	202 (8.0)	246 (9.7)	241 (9.5)	215 (8.5)	236 (9.3)	262 (10.3)	231 (9.1)	144 (5.7)	2,136 (84.1)
Average rainy days	15.6	13.3	17.5	19.9	27.4	28.1	29.4	28.6	28.6	28.8	26.4	21.0	284.6
Source: Meteoblue

== Demographics ==
Population census of Quezon

Year	Pop.	±% p.a.
1960	11,756	—
1970	18,735	+4.76%
1975	26,481	+7.19%
1980	33,032	+4.52%
1990	32,538	−0.15%
1995	36,856	+2.36%

Year	Pop.	±% p.a.
2000	41,669	+2.67%
2007	51,234	+2.89%
2010	55,142	+2.71%
2015	60,980	+1.94%
2020	65,283	+1.45%
2024	68,532	+1.17%

Source: Philippine Statistics Authority

In the 2024 census, the population of Quezon was 68,532 people, with a density of 73 inhabitants per square kilometre or 190 inhabitants per square mile.

=== Religion ===
In 2024, based on religion, the majority of the population of this municipality was Christianity (92.2%), followed by others (mainly tribal religion; 5.1%), then Islam (2.7%). Christianity, mostly from the Roman Catholic sect, is practiced by the indigenous peoples of Palawan and settlers from Luzon. Tribal religion is practiced by the indigenous tribes in the highlands, especially the Taaw't Bato and Tagbanwa peoples, also Islam is practiced by some of the native Palawano and Molbog peoples, also by Moro migrants such as Tausug and Maranao.

== Economy ==
Poverty incidence of Quezon (%)

Source: Philippine Statistics Authority

== Tabon Caves Museum ==
The National Museum of the Philippines opened of the Tabon Caves Museum at the Tabon Cave Complex and Lipuun Point in Quezon, Palawan on February 1, 2024. The inauguration was attended by Governor Victorino Dennis Socrates, 2nd District Palawan Representative Jose Alvarez, Quezon Mayor Joselito Ayala, National Museum of the Philippines Director General Jeremy R. Barns, among others.

== Education ==
There are two schools district offices which govern all educational institutions within the municipality. They oversee the management and operations of all private and public, from primary to secondary schools. These are the Quezon North Schools District, and Quezon South Schools District.

=== Primary and elementary schools ===
- Alfonso XIII Elementary School
- Aramaywan Elementary School
- Bagong Pag-asa Elementary School
- Balintang Elementary School
- Berong Elementary School
- Calumpang Elementary School
- CCT-Visions of Hope Christian School
- Emmanuel Southern Baptist Academy
- Faith Christian Academy
- Gugnan Elementary School
- Immaculate Conception Parochial School
- Isugod Elementary School
- Kalatabog Elementary School
- Kalatagbak Elementary School
- Ladayon Elementary School
- Lamane Elementary School
- Lambatan Elementary School
- Luke Society Kiddie Center
- Maasin Elementary School
- Magara Elementary School
- Malatgao Elementary School
- Marirong Elementary School
- Marnek Elementary School
- Matugbong Elementary School
- Nabugsuan Elementary School
- Natutungan Elementary School
- Pag-asa Elementary School
- Panibugon Elementary School
- Panitian Elementary School
- Pinaglabanan Elementary School
- Quezon Central School
- Quinlogan Elementary School
- Reservation Elementary School
- Serong Elementary School
- Simunong Elementary School
- Sowangan Elementary School
- Tabon Elementary School
- Tabud Elementary School
- Tagbae Elementary School
- Tagusao ELementary School
- Tina Elementary School
- Tungib Elementary School
- Underground Elementary School

=== Secondary schools ===
- Berong Barangay High School (Quezon-Aramaywan National High School - Berong Brgy. High School)
- Calumpang National High School
- Isugod National High School
- Little Baguio-Maasin National High School
- Malatgao National High School
- Pinaglabanan National High School
- Quezon National High School
- Quezon-Aramaywan National High School
- Quezon-Panitian National High School
- Quinlogan National High School
- Sowangan National High School
- Tabon National High School
- Tagusao National High School
