= Palawan's 2nd congressional district =

Legislative district of the Philippines

- Constituency for the House of Representatives of the Philippines
- Location of Palawan within the Philippines
- Province: Palawan
- Region: Mimaropa
- Population: 438,769 (2020)
- Electorate: 275,287 (2025)
- Major settlements: 7 LGUs: Municipalities; Balabac; Bataraza; Brooke's Point; Narra; Quezon; Rizal; Sofronio Española
- Area: 6,116.50 km^{2} (2,361.59 sq mi)

Current constituency
- Created: 1987
- Representative: Jose Chavez Alvarez
- Political party: NPC; PPPL
- Congressional bloc: Majority

Palawan's 2nd congressional district is one of the three congressional districts of the Philippines in the province of Palawan. It has been represented in the House of Representatives since 1987. The district encompasses the southern portion of Palawan Island including the Balabac Island group. It consists of the municipalities of Balabac, Bataraza, Brooke's Point, Narra, Quezon, Rizal and Sofronio Española. Prior to redistricting in 2012, the district also included the capital city Puerto Princesa and the municipality of Aborlan. The district is currently represented in the 19th Congress by Jose C. Alvarez of the Nationalist People's Coalition (NPC) and Partidong Pagbabago ng Palawan (PPPL).

== Representation history ==
#	Image	Member	Term of office		Congress	Party	Electoral history	Constituent LGUs
#	Image	Member	Start	End	Congress	Party	Electoral history	Constituent LGUs
=== Palawan's 2nd district for the House of Representatives of the Philippines ===
District created February 2, 1987 from Palawan's at-large district.
1		Ramon Mitra Jr.	June 30, 1987	June 30, 1992	8th	Lakas ng Bansa	Elected in 1987.	1987–1992; Aborlan, Balabac, Bataraza, Brooke's Point, Marcos, Narra, Puerto Princesa, Quezon
1		Ramon Mitra Jr.	June 30, 1987	June 30, 1992	8th	LDP	Elected in 1987.	1987–1992; Aborlan, Balabac, Bataraza, Brooke's Point, Marcos, Narra, Puerto Princesa, Quezon
2		Alfredo Abueg Jr.	June 30, 1992	June 30, 2001	9th	Lakas	Elected in 1992.	1992–1995; Aborlan, Balabac, Bataraza, Brooke's Point, Narra, Puerto Princesa, Quezon, Rizal
2		Alfredo Abueg Jr.	June 30, 1992	June 30, 2001	10th	Lakas	Re-elected in 1995.	1995–2013; Aborlan, Balabac, Bataraza, Brooke's Point, Narra, Puerto Princesa, Quezon, Rizal, Sofronio Española
2		Alfredo Abueg Jr.	June 30, 1992	June 30, 2001	11th	LAMMP	Re-elected in 1998.	1995–2013; Aborlan, Balabac, Bataraza, Brooke's Point, Narra, Puerto Princesa, Quezon, Rizal, Sofronio Española
3		Abraham Mitra	June 30, 2001	June 30, 2010	12th	Liberal	Elected in 2001.	1995–2013; Aborlan, Balabac, Bataraza, Brooke's Point, Narra, Puerto Princesa, Quezon, Rizal, Sofronio Española
3		Abraham Mitra	June 30, 2001	June 30, 2010	13th	Liberal	Re-elected in 2004.	1995–2013; Aborlan, Balabac, Bataraza, Brooke's Point, Narra, Puerto Princesa, Quezon, Rizal, Sofronio Española
3		Abraham Mitra	June 30, 2001	June 30, 2010	14th	Liberal	Re-elected in 2007.	1995–2013; Aborlan, Balabac, Bataraza, Brooke's Point, Narra, Puerto Princesa, Quezon, Rizal, Sofronio Española
4		Victorino Dennis Socrates	June 30, 2010	June 30, 2013	15th	NPC	Elected in 2010.	1995–2013; Aborlan, Balabac, Bataraza, Brooke's Point, Narra, Puerto Princesa, Quezon, Rizal, Sofronio Española
4		Victorino Dennis Socrates	June 30, 2010	June 30, 2013	15th	NUP	Elected in 2010.	1995–2013; Aborlan, Balabac, Bataraza, Brooke's Point, Narra, Puerto Princesa, Quezon, Rizal, Sofronio Española
5		Frederick Abueg	June 30, 2013	June 30, 2019	16th	NUP	Elected in 2013.	2013–present Balabac, Bataraza, Brooke's Point, Narra, Quezon, Rizal, Sofronio Española
5		Frederick Abueg	June 30, 2013	June 30, 2019	17th	PDP–Laban	Re-elected in 2016.	2013–present Balabac, Bataraza, Brooke's Point, Narra, Quezon, Rizal, Sofronio Española
6		Beng Abueg-Zaldivar	June 30, 2019	June 30, 2022	18th	PPPL	Elected in 2019.	2013–present Balabac, Bataraza, Brooke's Point, Narra, Quezon, Rizal, Sofronio Española
6		Beng Abueg-Zaldivar	June 30, 2019	June 30, 2022	18th	Liberal	Elected in 2019.	2013–present Balabac, Bataraza, Brooke's Point, Narra, Quezon, Rizal, Sofronio Española
7		Jose C. Alvarez	June 30, 2022	Incumbent	19th	PDP (PPPL)	Elected in 2022.	2013–present Balabac, Bataraza, Brooke's Point, Narra, Quezon, Rizal, Sofronio Española
7		Jose C. Alvarez	June 30, 2022	Incumbent	20th	NPC (PPPL)	Re-elected in 2025.	2013–present Balabac, Bataraza, Brooke's Point, Narra, Quezon, Rizal, Sofronio Española

== Election results ==
=== 2025 ===
Candidate	Party	Votes	%
Jose Alvarez (incumbent)	Nationalist People's Coalition	139,469	67.29
Beng Abueg	Liberal Party	67,801	32.71
Total		207,270	100.00
Valid votes		207,270	91.38
Invalid/blank votes		19,563	8.62
Total votes		226,833	100.00
Registered voters/turnout		275,287	82.40
Nationalist People's Coalition hold			
Source: Commission on Elections

=== 2022 ===
Candidate	Party	Votes	%
Jose Alvarez	PDP–Laban	99,081	51.77
Beng Abueg (incumbent)	Liberal Party	62,210	32.50
Pen Cascolan	Kilusang Bagong Lipunan	14,792	7.73
Edwin Gastanes	Independent	13,063	6.83
Rico Mejorada	Independent	1,153	0.60
Magnolia May de Leon	Independent	1,093	0.57
Total		191,392	100.00
Total votes		215,762	–
Registered voters/turnout		260,323	82.88
PDP–Laban gain from Liberal Party			
Source: Commission on Elections

== See also ==
- Legislative districts of Palawan

House of Representatives of the Philippines
Preceded by Southern Leyte's at-large congressional district as Home district of the speaker of the Regular Batasang Pambansa	Home district of the speaker July 27, 1987 – June 17, 1992	Succeeded by Pangasinan's 4th congressional district
