= Peoples of Palawan =

People of Philippine province

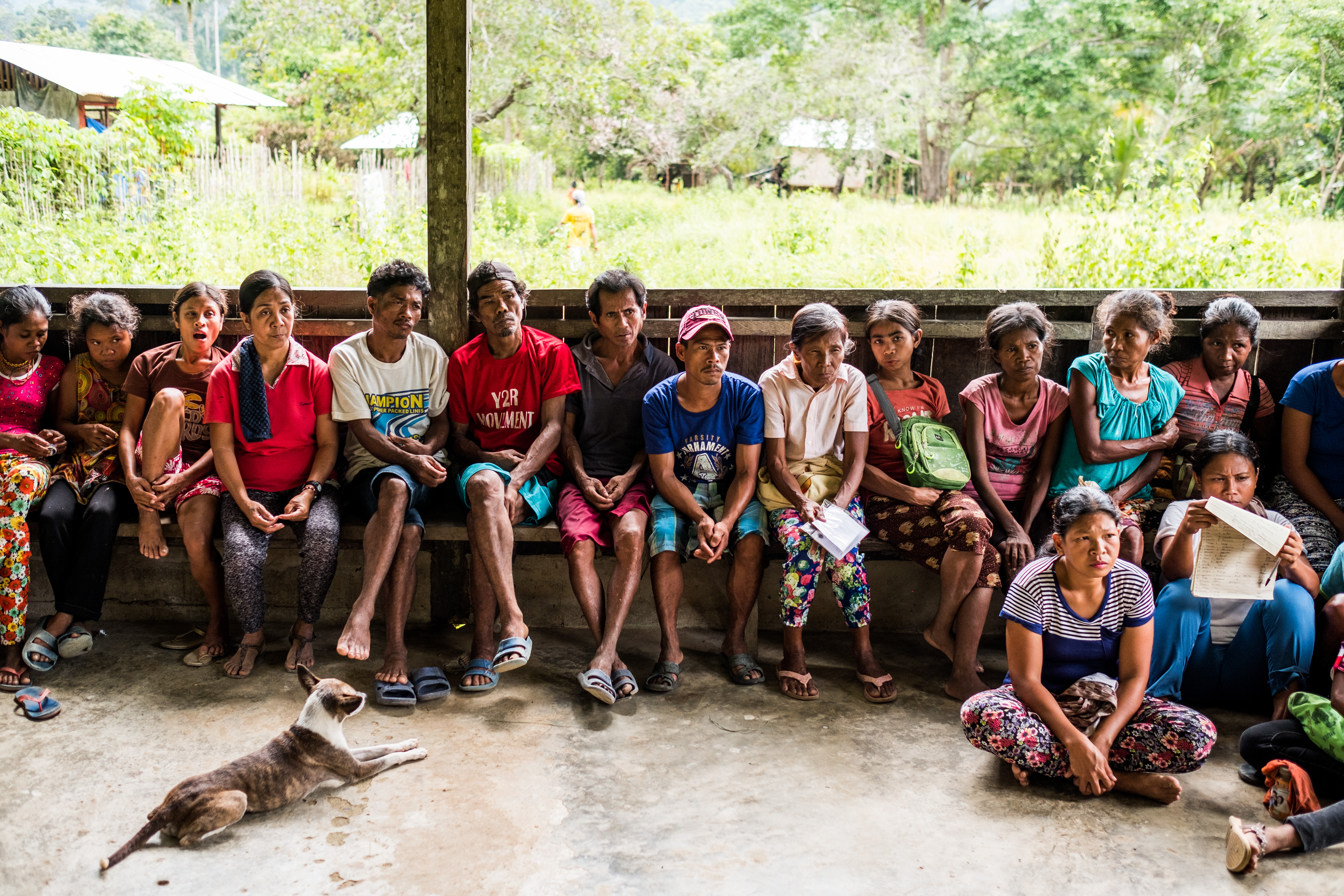
Palawan Indigenous peoples in a community meeting in 2017

Palawan, the largest province in the Philippines, is home to several indigenous ethnolinguistic groups namely, the Tagbanwa, Pala'wan, Molbog, and Batak tribes. They live in remote villages in the mountains and coastal areas.

In 1962, a team of anthropologists from the National Museum led by Dr. Robert Fox unearthed fossils at Lipuun Point (now known as the Tabon Cave Complex) in Quezon town that were classified as those of Homo sapiens and believed to be 22,000 to 24,000 years old. The recovery of the Tabon Man and other significant findings in the area earned for Palawan the title, "the Cradle of Philippine Civilization." Research has shown that the Tagbanwa and Palawano are possible descendants of the Tabon Caves' inhabitants. Their language and alphabet, farming methods, and common belief in soul relatives are some of their cultural similarities.

After the death of Ferdinand Magellan, the remnant of his fleet landed in Palawan. Magellan's chronicler, Antonio Pigafetta, in his writings, described the cultivated fields of the native people populating the Palawan Islands. He also mentioned that these people use weapons consisting of blowpipes, spears, and bronze ombard. During his stay in the area, he witnessed for the first time cockfighting and fistfighting. He also discovered that the natives had their own system of writing consisting of 13 consonants and 3 vowels, and they had a dialect of 18 syllables. He further wrote that in Palawan, the local king had 10 scribes who wrote down the king's dictation on leaves of plants.

== Ethnic groups ==
=== Batak ===
The Batak, which means "mountain people" in Cuyonon, are a group of Indigenous people that reside in the northeast portion of Palawan. They live in the rugged interiors of northeastern Palawan. Living close to nature, they are a peaceful and shy people. These people believe in nature spirits, with whom they communicate through a babaylan or medium.

=== Palaweños ===
Native-born lowland dwellers (calling themselves Palaweños, much to the amusement and distress of the original tribal groups, such as the Palawan, who are called Palawano by outsiders) include the Cuyunon and Agutayanon sub-groups. The Cuyunons, originally from the island town of Cuyo east of northern Palawan, are considered the elite class in this group. They are religious, disciplined and have a highly developed community spirit. Their conversion to Christianity has led to the merge of animistic beliefs with Christian elements to produce a folk Christianity which is the prevailing belief of the Cuyunon. The Agutayanon practice a simpler island lifestyle, with fishing and farming as their main source of livelihood.

=== Palawano ===
The Palawan tribe, also known as Pala'wan (or Palawan, depending on sub-dialect) or Palawano (only by outsiders), is one of the indigenous peoples of Palawan. They traditionally hunt using spears and bamboo blowguns.

The Palawano closely resemble the Tagbanwa, and in the past, they were doubtless the same people. Some Tausug residents in Palawan call the Palawano Traan, which means "people in scattered places". Like the Yakan of Basilan, the Palawano live in houses out of sight of each other, scattered among their plots of farm lands. Their main occupation is subsistence farming, cultivating mainly upland rice.

The tribe is composed of several sub-groups. One small community of S.W. Palawanos, living in the internal mountain are known as the taaw't bato (often misspelled by Filipinos as tau't bato by substituting the Tagalog word tao "people" for the Palawano word taaw). Taaw't Bato means simple the "people of the rock." They are found in the southern interior of Palawan in the volcanic crater of Mount Mantalingaan. Some uninformed outsiders believe there is a separate group called Ke'ney (and similar forms), but this is simply a derogatory term meaning "thick, upriver people." No one uses the term to refer to themselves as a people.

Most of the Palawans are now settled in the highlands of the island of Palawan, from just north of Quezon on the west side and Abo-Abo on the east, all the way to the southern tip of the island at Buliluyan. Their religion is an old form of belief once practiced throughout the central Philippines prior to the Spanish arrival in the 16th century; a mix of traditional animism with elements of Hinduism and Islamic belief. Some have embraced Islam from their southern Molbog and Palawani neighbors. A small number of them are Protestant due to recent missionary campaigns.

==== Taawʼt Bato ====
The Taawʼt Bato means "people of the rock". They are a small community of traditional southwestern Palawanos who reside in the crater of an extinct volcano during certain seasons of the year, in houses built on raised floors inside caves though others have set their homes on the open slopes. They are found in the Singnapan Basin, a valley bounded by Mount Matalingahan on the east and the coast on the west. North of them is the municipality of Quezon, and to the south are the still unexplored regions of Palawan.

They are still primitive in their lifestyle, even in the way of dressing. The men still wear loincloths made of bark and cloth, and the women wear a piece of cloth made into skirts to cover the lower body. Both of them are half naked, but sometimes women wear a blouse that is not Indigenous but obtained through the market system.

Taawʼt Bato artistry is cruder compared to other Palawan groups, except in exceptional cases involving basketry. Around cave-dwellings, for example, they construct a light and sturdy lattice-work made of saplings lashed together and anchored fast to crevices in the walls to provide access to the caves. The construction does not depend on any major framework to hold the unit against the walls. The anchorage is distributed all along the framework such that the breakdown of one section can be compensated for by the rest of the construction. With conditions varying in different caves, there are modifications and elaboration on the basic datag or sleeping platforms, and lagkaw or granary.

They are swidden cultivators, practicing multiple cropping with cassava as the major source of carbohydrate. They also produce sweet potato, sugarcane, malungay, garlic, pepper, string beans, squash, tomato, pineapple, etc. Throughout the year, hunting and foraging are pursued to complement the carbohydrate diet of the people. Most of the wild pigs are caught through spring traps.

They also indulge in sambi (barter) and dagang (monetary exchange). The trade is specifically for marine fish which the people of Candawaga provide in exchange for horticultural products of the Taawʼt-Bato. Dagang involves forest products like the almaciga, rattan, etc.

The basic social unit among the Taawʼt-Bato of Singnapan is the ka-asawan (marriage group). This extends from the basic couple, man and woman, to the more complex arrangements of a compound and extended family grouping. The ka-asawahan or households units are further grouped into larger associations called bulun-bulun, which literally means "gathering". These multi-household bands are physically bounded in the terms of areas of habitation. Each bulun-bulun ordinarily occupies a single cave for residence, or a single house complex in the swidden area. One thing clear is that membership in a bulun-bulun is characterized by the ecosystem of sharing through different types of social and material exchanges, a prominent example being the sharing of food.

Because of their uniqueness, the Philippine government declared their area off limits to strangers to protect them from unreasonable exploitation. This tribe subsists on hunting, gathering fruits and planting crops and rice near the forest. However, the tribe have recently come under threat from mining concessions that have been granted. In particular the communities living around the Mt. Gangtong and Mantalingahan range have been affected by claims upon their land for nickel mining. This is despite measures that were taken to prevent events like this from happening as prior claims for mining are still valid.

A species of lizard, Cyrtodactylus tautbatorum, is named in honor of the Taawʼt-Bato peoples.

=== Tagbanwa ===
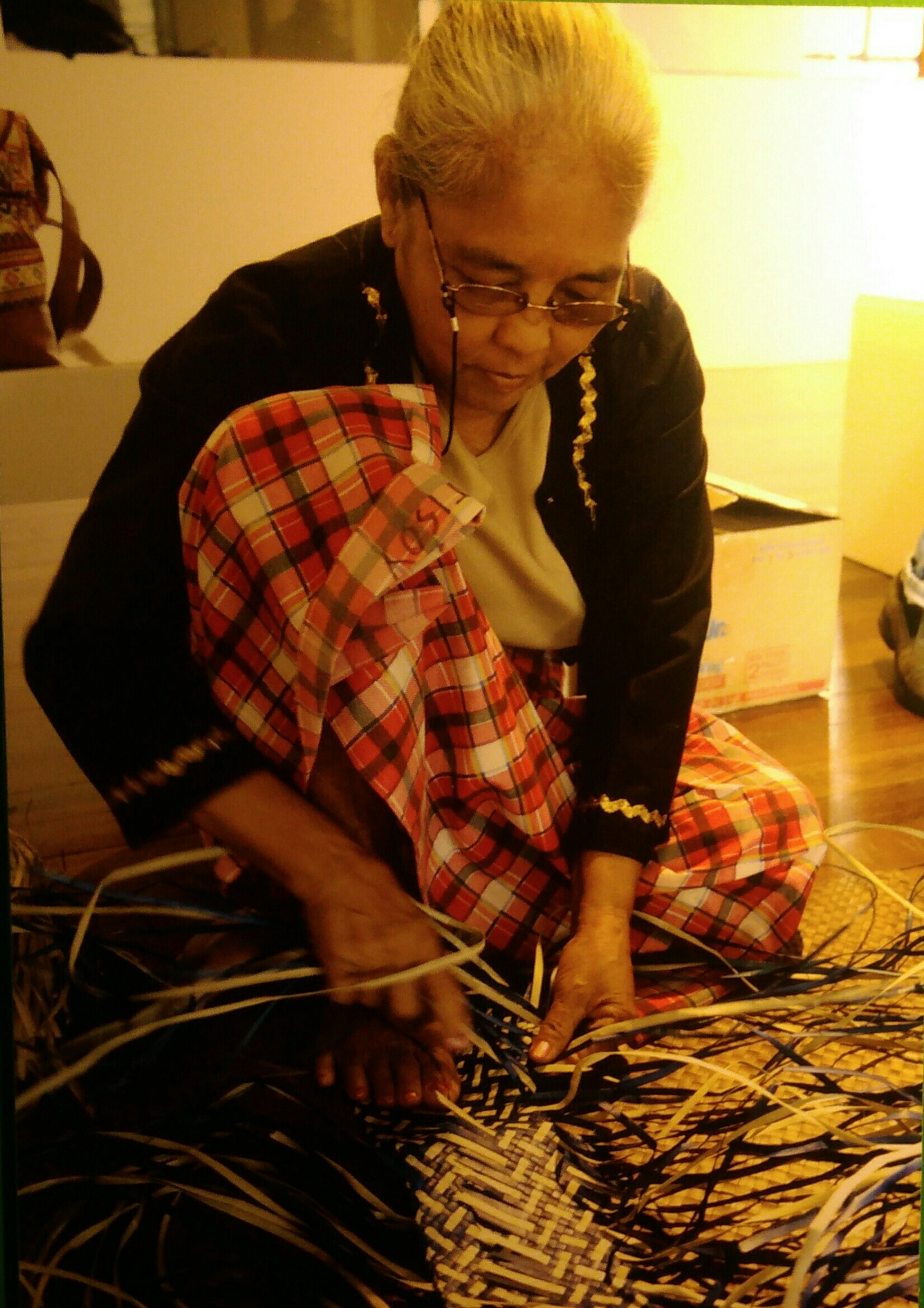
A Tagbanua weaver

The Tagbanwa (or Tagbanua) tribes, or "people of the world", are found in central and northern Palawan. They practice shifting cultivation of upland rice, which is considered a divine gift, and are known for their rice wine ritual called pagdiwata. Central Tagbanwas are found in the western and eastern coastal areas of central Palawan. They are concentrated in the municipalities of Aborlan, Quezon, and Puerto Princesa. Calamian Tagbanwa, on the other hand, are found in Baras coast, Busuanga Island, Coron Island, Linipacan, Calibangbangan, a Cultural Preservation area (off limits to foreigners and the largest Contiguous grouping), and in some parts of El Nido.

Shifting cultivation of upland rice is part of their cultural and economic practices. Rice is considered a divine gift and is fermented to make rice wine, which they use in Pagdiwata, or rice wine ritual. The cult of the dead is the key to the religious system of the Tagbanwa. They believe in several deities found in the natural environment. Their language and alphabet, practice of kaingin and common belief in soul-relatives are part of their culture.

This group is known for basketry, wood carving, and body accessories. Their combs, bracelets, necklaces and anklets are usually made of wood, beads, brass and copper.

The Tagbanwa of Aborlan were scheduled to receive their Certificate of Ancestral Domain (CADT) from the government in November 2021.

=== Molbog ===
The Molbog people dominate the municipalities of Balabac and Bataraza in southern Palawan, then also in the neighboring municipalities of Brooke's Point and Rizal, as well as a small number on the north coast of Borneo and Mapun in Tawi-Tawi. They are the only indigenous people in Palawan where the majority of its people are Muslims. The area constitutes the homeland of the Molbog people since the classical era prior to Spanish colonization. Ethnically, the Molbog were previously a sub-group of the larger Palaw'an people, and later formed their own identity to Islamic influences from the Tausug and Sama-Bajau peoples.

The Molbog are known to have a strong connection with the natural world, especially with the sacred pilandok (Philippine mouse-deer), which can only be found in the Balabac islands. A Muslim tale tells the Philippine mouse-deer once tricked a prince into giving up his bag of gold and facing a hive of angry bees. Another tale depicts him as a clever guardian of the environment, using his wisdom as an advantage against those who destroy forests, seas, and wildlife. The coconut is especially important in Molbog culture as it is their most prized agricultural crop.

The Molbog people filed in 2005 an application for a CADT for their ancestral lands in Mariahangin, Bugsuk, Palawan.
