= Rizal, Palawan =

Municipality in Palawan, Philippines

Rizal Marcos
- Municipality
- Municipality of Dr. Jose P. Rizal
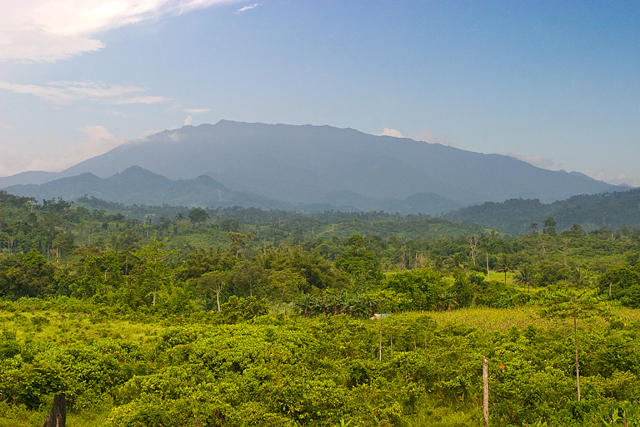
- Mount Mantalingajan as seen from Ransang, Rizal

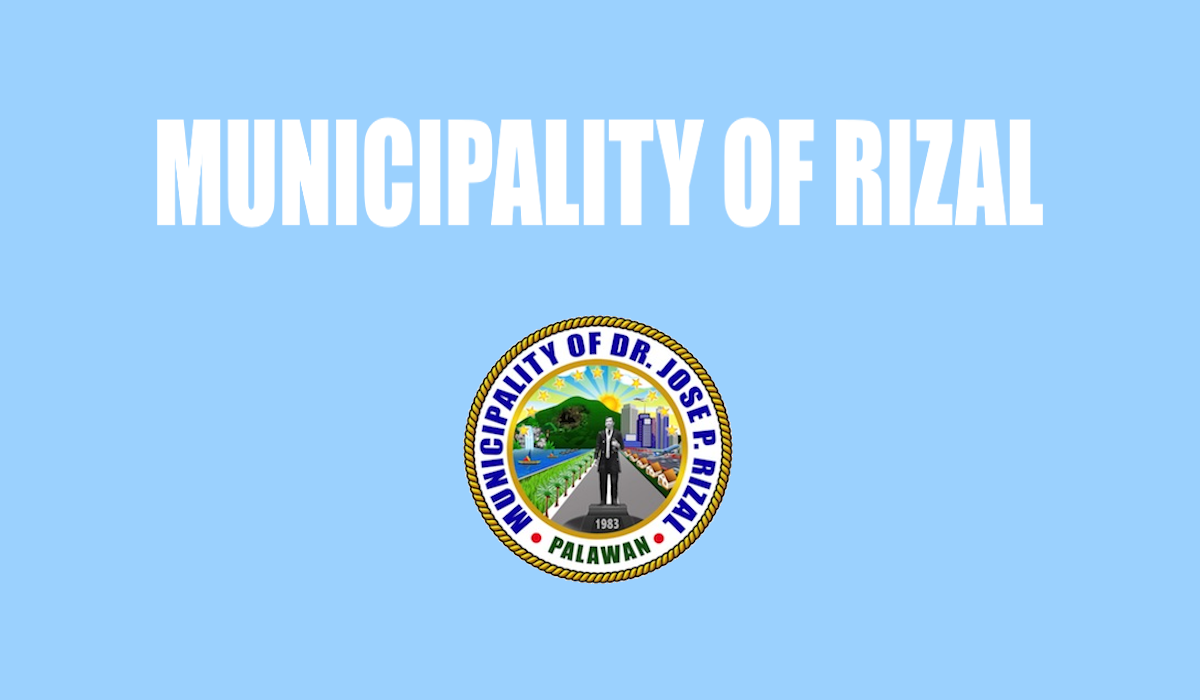
- Flag

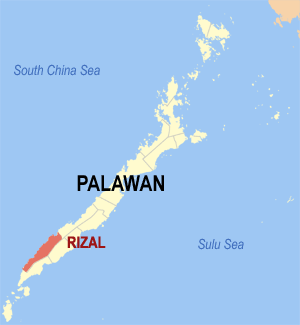
- Map of Palawan with Rizal highlighted
- Interactive map of Rizal
- Location within the Philippines
- Coordinates: 9°02′02″N 117°38′35″E
- Country: Philippines
- Region: Mimaropa
- Province: Palawan
- District: 2nd district
- Founded: April 14, 1983
- Renamed: April 17, 1988
- Named for: Dr. José Rizal
- Barangays: 11 (see Barangays)

Government
  - Type: Sangguniang Bayan
  - Mayor: Norman S. Ong
  - Vice Mayor: Maria Gracia M. Zapanta
  - Representative: Jose Ch. Alvarez
  - Municipal Council: Members: Zaldy J. Magbanua; Rona Lastimosa; Kim Apostol; Jethro L. Degillo; Jalil Insani; Sherwin Macasaet; BJ Monggal; Arvin C. Fuentes
  - Electorate: 34,052 voters (2025)

Area
  - Total: 1,256.47 km^{2} (485.13 sq mi)
- Elevation: 17 m (56 ft)
- Highest elevation: 160 m (520 ft)
- Lowest elevation: 0 m (0 ft)

Population (2024 census)
  - Total: 59,040
  - Density: 46.99/km^{2} (121.7/sq mi)
  - Households: 14,028

Economy
  - Income class: 1st municipal income class
  - Poverty incidence: 40.65% (2023)
  - Revenue: ₱ 563.1 million (2022)
  - Assets: ₱ 1,327 million (2022)
  - Expenditure: ₱ 419.4 million (2022)
  - Liabilities: ₱ 436.4 million (2022)

Service provider
  - Electricity: Palawan Electric Cooperative (PALECO)
- Time zone: UTC+8 (PST)
- ZIP code: 5323
- PSGC: 1705323000
- IDD : area code: +63 (0)48
- Native languages: Molbog; Palawano; Taaw't Bato; Tagalog

Rizal, officially the Municipality of Dr. Jose P. Rizal, (Tagalog: Bayan ng Rizal), is a municipality in the province of Palawan, Philippines. According to the 2024 census, it has a population of 59,040 people.

The municipality is home to the Singnapan charcoal petrographs.

== History ==
Prior to its formation as a separate municipality, the place was known as Tarumpitao Point and was part of the Municipality of Quezon. By virtue of Batas Pambansa Blg. 386, it was formed as a municipality on April 14, 1983, called Marcos. It was renamed after José Rizal in 1987 through Republic Act No. 6652.

== Geography ==
Rizal is 203 kilometers (126 mi) from Puerto Princesa.

=== Barangays ===
Rizal is politically subdivided into 11 barangays. Each barangay consists of puroks and some have sitios.

- Bunog
- Campong Ulay
- Candawaga
- Canipaan
- Culasian
- Iraan
- Latud
- Panalingaan
- Punta Baja (Poblacion)
- Ransang
- Taburi

=== Climate ===
Climate data for Rizal, Palawan
Month	Jan	Feb	Mar	Apr	May	Jun	Jul	Aug	Sep	Oct	Nov	Dec	Year
Mean daily maximum °C (°F)	30 (86)	31 (88)	31 (88)	31 (88)	31 (88)	31 (88)	30 (86)	29 (84)	29 (84)	29 (84)	30 (86)	30 (86)	30 (86)
Mean daily minimum °C (°F)	23 (73)	23 (73)	24 (75)	25 (77)	25 (77)	25 (77)	25 (77)	25 (77)	25 (77)	25 (77)	25 (77)	24 (75)	25 (76)
Average precipitation mm (inches)	69 (2.7)	55 (2.2)	87 (3.4)	97 (3.8)	190 (7.5)	263 (10.4)	259 (10.2)	239 (9.4)	256 (10.1)	260 (10.2)	218 (8.6)	131 (5.2)	2,124 (83.7)
Average rainy days	13.4	11.6	16.9	19.1	27.6	28.5	29.2	28.8	28.7	28.9	25.7	20.1	278.5
Source: Meteoblue

== Demographics ==
Population census of Rizal
Year	Pop.	±% p.a.
1990	16,819	—
1995	31,745	+12.64%
2000	21,876	−7.67%
2007	35,487	+6.90%
2010	42,759	+7.02%
2015	50,096	+3.06%
2020	56,162	+2.43%
2024	59,040	+1.21%
Source: Philippine Statistics Authority

In the 2024 census, the population of Rizal was 59,040 people, with a density of 47 inhabitants per square kilometer or 120 inhabitants per square mile.

Among the ethnic groups in Rizal are the Tao't Bato people. These people settle in caves during the rainy season and resides at Singnapan Valley area in Barangay Ransang.

=== Religion ===
In 2024, based on religion, the majority of Rizal's population was Christianity (72.6%), then others (especially tribal religions; 24.2%), and Islam (3.2%). Christianity and other religions are almost entirely practiced by the indigenous peoples of Palawan, especially the native Rizal, Taaw't Bato people, and other immigrants. Islam, on the other hand, is practiced by the Molbog people and a small portion of Palawano.

== Economy ==
Poverty incidence of Rizal (%)

Source: Philippine Statistics Authority

== Singnapan Cave Petrographs ==
The charcoal-drawn petrographs of the Singnapan Valley are one of the most important ancient paintings in the country. The date of the paintings have yet to be scientifically established. Due to its high significance, it was submitted by the National Commission for Culture and the Arts of the Philippines to the UNESCO Tentative List of Heritage Sites in 2006, pending its inclusion in the World Heritage List along with the Alab petroglyphs of Mountain Province, Angono Petroglyphs of Rizal province, charcoal-drawn Penablanca petrographs of Cagayan, and the Anda red hermatite print petrographs of Bohol.

== Education ==
The Rizal Schools District Office governs all educational institutions within the municipality. It oversees the management and operations of all private and public, from primary to secondary schools.

=== Primary and elementary schools ===
- Balite Elementary School
- Bintat Karis Elementary School
- Bulno Elementary School
- Bunog Elementary School
- Busay Elementary School
- Cabcungan Elementary School (FLRF Village)
- Cadawan Elementary School
- Calupisan Elementary School
- Campong-Ulay Elementary School
- Candawaga Elementary School
- Canipaan Elementary School
- Canipaan Elementary School (Tagasag Extension)
- Colandanum Elementary School
- Culasian Elementary School (New)
- Culasian Elementary School (Old)
- Cumahos Elementary School
- Dignuzon Elementary School
- Good Shepherd Christian Academy
- Guilingan Elementary School
- Imbo Elementary School
- Kamantian Elementary School
- Kadulan Elementary School
- Labangan Elementary School
- Latud Elementary School
- Magkalip Elementary School
- Malapandeg Elementary School
- Malutok Elementary School
- Maruso Elementary School
- Molid Elementary School
- Odyong Elementary School
- Panalingaan Elementary School
- Rancho II Elementary School
- Ransang North Elementary School
- Ransang South Elementary School
- Rizal Central School
- Salongsong Elementary School
- Sicud Elementary School
- Sumurum Elementary School
- Tagbiao-Biao Elementary School
- Tagbita Elementary School
- Tagpas Elementary School
- Tarumpitao Point Elementary School
- Tulapos Elementary School

=== Secondary schools ===
- Bunog National High School
- Candawaga National High School
- Canipaan National High School
- Jose P. Rizal National High School
- Panalingaan National High School
- Ransang National High School
- Speaker Ramon V. Mitra Jr. National High School
- Taburi National High School

=== Tertiary school ===
Palawan State University (Marcos Town Campus)
