= Balabac, Palawan =

Municipality in Palawan, Philippines

Balabac بالابچ
- Municipality
- Municipality of Balabac
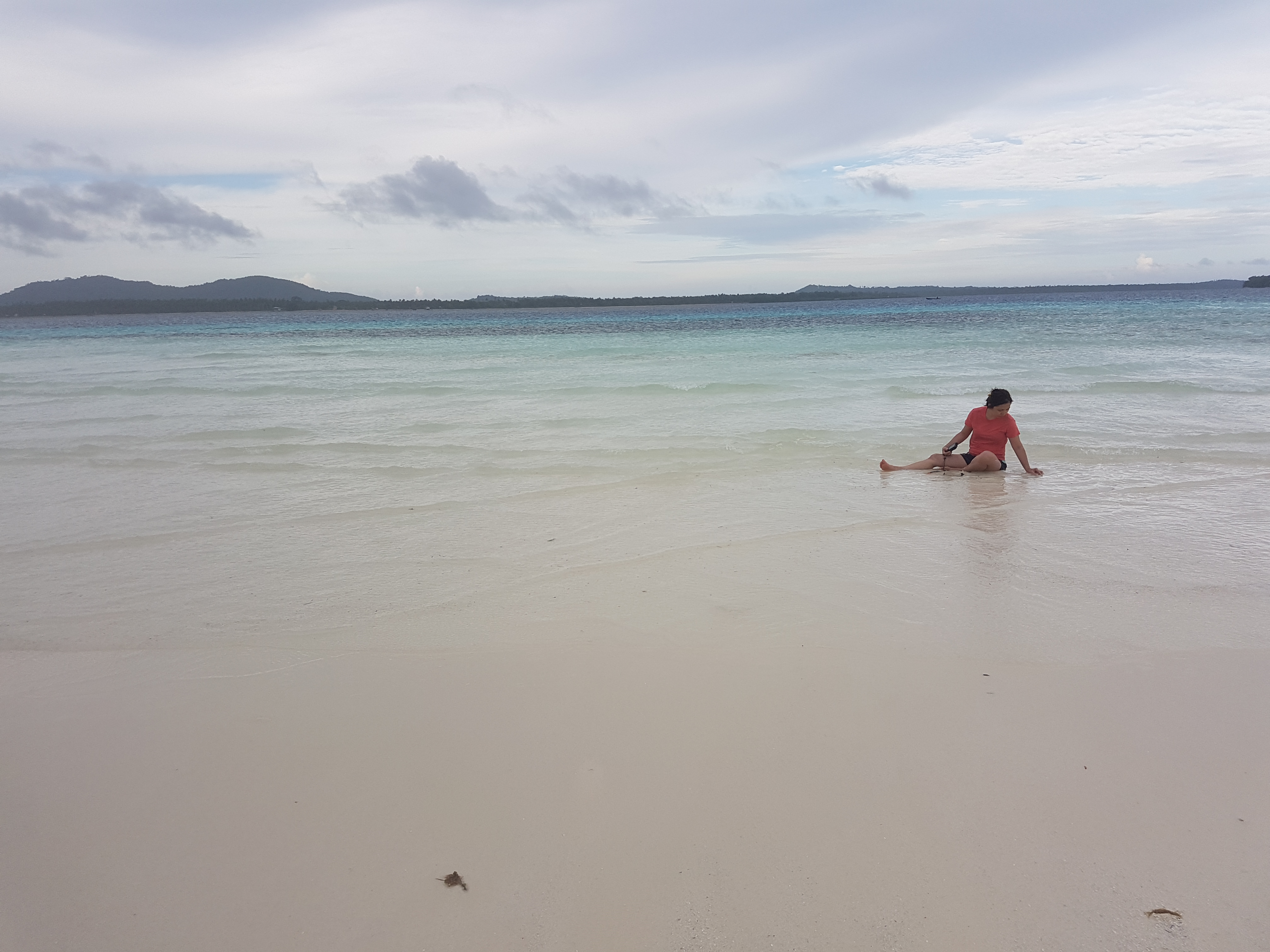
- Benlen Sandbar

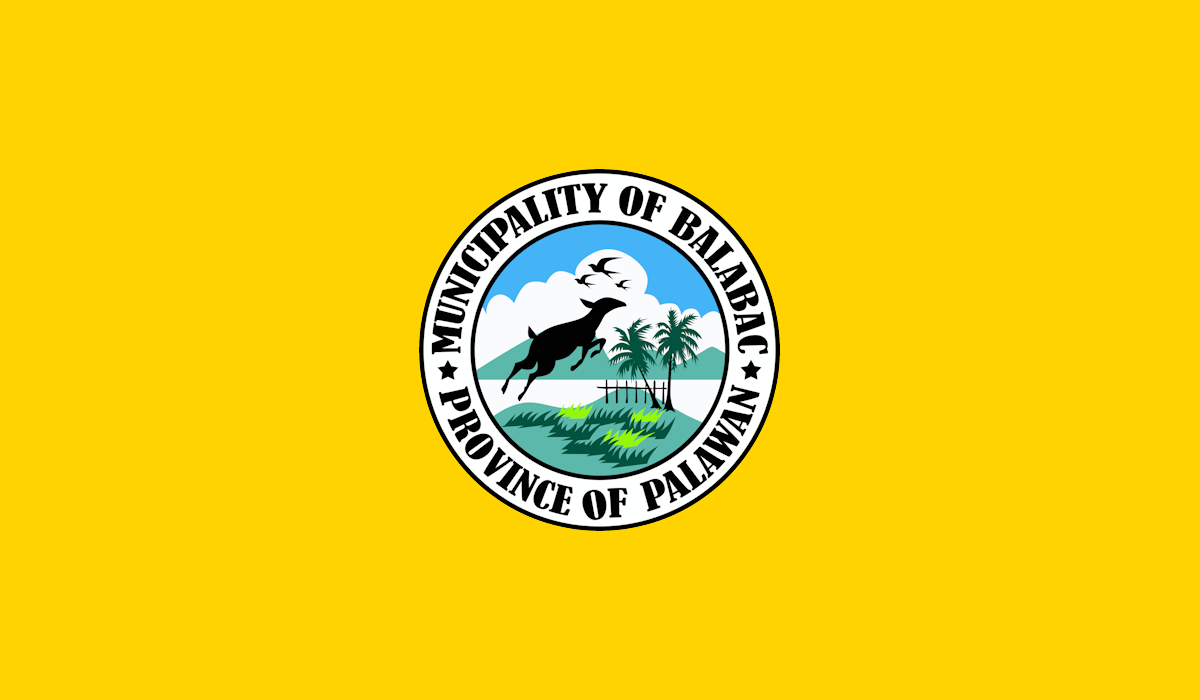
- Flag Seal

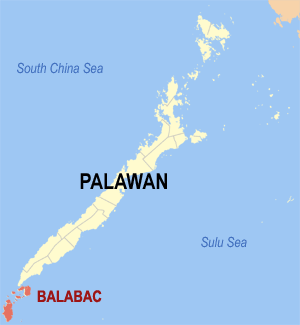
- Map of Palawan with Balabac highlighted
- Interactive map of Balabac
- Location within the Philippines
- Coordinates: 7°59′10″N 117°03′54″E
- Country: Philippines
- Region: Mimaropa
- Province: Palawan
- District: 2nd district
- Founded: 1957
- Barangays: 20 (see Barangays)

Government
  - Type: Sangguniang Bayan
  - Mayor: Shuaib J. Astami
  - Vice Mayor: Al-Hazni A. Astami
  - Representative: Jose Ch. Alvarez
  - Municipal Council: Members: Fatima Ariesa Ulyzziz U. Hussin; Rabbana B. Ami; Alkhases K. Omar; Salamia A. Asli; Madsabbri H. Leging; Rudy A. Mohammad-Ain; Abdul Aziz S. Astami; Cherry-lyn S. Hamja
  - Electorate: 23,800 voters (2025)

Area
  - Total: 581.60 km^{2} (224.56 sq mi)
- Elevation: 4.0 m (13.1 ft)
- Highest elevation: 1,035 m (3,396 ft)
- Lowest elevation: 0 m (0 ft)

Population (2024 census)
  - Total: 42,662
  - Density: 73.353/km^{2} (189.98/sq mi)
  - Households: 9,267

Economy
  - Income class: 1st municipal income class
  - Poverty incidence: 45.94% (2023)
  - Revenue: ₱ 300.5 million (2024)
  - Assets: ₱ 590.1 million (2024)
  - Expenditure: ₱ 263.6 million (2024)
  - Liabilities: ₱ 79.7 million (2024)

Service provider
  - Electricity: Palawan Electric Cooperative (PALECO)
- Time zone: UTC+8 (PST)
- ZIP code: 5307
- PSGC: 1705304000
- IDD : area code: +63 (0)48
- Native languages: Bonggi; Molbog; Kagayanen; Sabah Malay; Sama; Tagalog

Balabac, officially the Municipality of Balabac (Malay: ڤربندرن بالابچ, romanized: Perbandaran Balabac; Tagalog: Bayan ng Balabac), is a municipality in the province of Palawan, Philippines. According to the 2024 census, it has a population of 42,662 people.

== Etymology ==
=== Former names ===
The natives used to call the town Molbog, derived from the name of their tribe. Another name was Balabag which meant "cross-wise". This name was derived from the geographical position of the main island. Balabag eventually came to be known as Balabac, the present name.

== History ==
=== Islamic era ===
Balabac used to be one of the many territories of the Sultanate of Brunei before it was taken by the Sultanate of Sulu when it tried to secede from the influence of Brunei before the Spanish arrival in the Philippines.

=== Spanish era ===
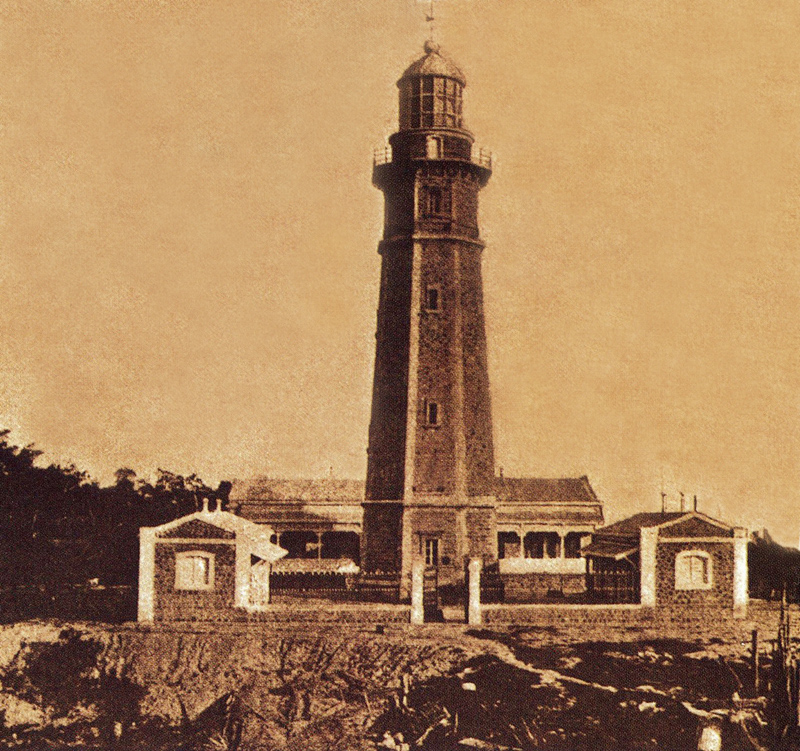
Cape Melville Lighthouse on the southern point of Balabac Island, circa 1892.

According to a report in April 1753, the Spaniards claimed that by this point, Sulu had 'usurped' Brunei's domains in Palawan and Balabac. The Spaniards then arrested the Sultan of Sulu for his "faithlessness", and attempted to restore friendly relations with the Sultan of Brunei, before informing the King of Spain that Palawan and Balabac were now part of his domains. They proceeded to arrive on Balabac and Palawan accompanied by Kapampangan mercenaries from Luzon. During this era, Balabac was used as a defensive point by the Spaniards due to its proximity with the Sulu Sea, and became useful for waging war against the pirates of Sulu, Tidung and Kamukons. In another report in July of the same year during another expedition, the Spaniards reported that the inhabitants of Balabac had no king and were hostile to anyone, and that the climate was so bad that 116 men, which composed of half of the expeditionary force had died with 200 sick, and that much of the complimentary information told about Palawan's beauty were false.

During the early part of Spanish rule, Balabac were composed of barangays under the rule of datus. However, in the later part of their rule, each district was ruled by panglimas (military leader), which were essentially barrio lieutenants. The highest official in the town was the gobernadorcillo. These times were often not peaceful due to frequent pirate raids coming from Sulu, Tidung and Brunei.

On September 23, 1836, a treaty was signed between Spain and Sulu, and in Article I of this treaty, it was made clear that Balabac and Cagayan de Sulu (now Mapun) were part of the Sulu Archipelago.

In 1878, Balabac, Palawan, and neighboring islands came under the rule of the Moro datu Harun ar-Rashid, a relative of the Sultan of Sulu, who was entrusted with authority over the area by the Spaniards following the 1878 Agreement.

In 1885, the Madrid Protocol was signed between the United Kingdom, Germany and Spain. In this treaty, both the United Kingdom and Germany recognized Spain's sovereignty over Balabac and Cagayan de Sulu.

==== Cape Melville Lighthouse ====
The Cape Melville Lighthouse, located on the island of Balabac, is one of the Philippines oldest lighthouses built in 1892 during the Spanish era and a major landmark of the town.

=== Revolutionary era ===
During the Philippine Revolution in 1898, after Emilio Aguinaldo became the President of the newly formed Revolutionary Government of the Philippines, there was a time of uncertainty. As Balabac was still under Spanish control, the Moros took it to themselves and began killing priests, nuns, and officers of the Spanish constabulary and were dropped in a well. The Melville Lighthouse were then destroyed by Moro bands led by a Christian named Diego.

=== American era ===
During this period, Balabac became a port of entry and a branch of the Bureau of Customs was established. In 1907, Balabac was converted into a municipal district, electing its first ever municipal president. It was in this same year that a school was also established. During the American period there were clashes between the Philippine Constabulary and the civilians.

=== World War II ===
In 1942, the Imperial Japanese Army occupied Balabac, using vacated private buildings school buildings and emergency hospitals as their barracks and quarters. At first they were good to the people, opening schools and teaching Nihongo. They also organized the Kalibapi and the Neighborhood Association to keep things under control. But in the later part of the war, things became unpleasant as guerrilla activity in the island increased. The Bolo Battalion of the guerrilla army was formed against the Japanese.

During World War II, American forces bombed Japanese transport vessels within the bay. By 1945, when the Imperial Japanese Army withdrew from the area, they left behind some of their equipment. Subsequently, forces of the Imperial Japanese Navy arrived in Balabac by motorboat but were reportedly killed by members of the Bolo Battalion.

=== Post-war independence ===
Balabac was converted from a municipal district to a full municipality in 1957. Before that, it was a barrio of neighboring Bataraza.

== Geography ==
Not considering the disputed Spratly Islands, the municipality is the westernmost point in the Philippines. It is separated from Sabah by the Balabac Strait.

The municipality consists of some 36 islands, including the eponymous Balabac Island. The islands are notable for their uncommon indigenous plant and animal species, such as the nocturnal Philippine mouse-deer (or Pilandok). The islands are also home to dugongs, saltwater crocodiles, sawfishes, and sea turtles. Due to its biodiversity, the terrestrial and marine ecosystems of the Balabac archipelago are currently being pushed by scholars to be included in the tentative list of the Philippines for a possible UNESCO World Heritage Site nomination in the future.

The Coycoy Reef, also known as the Mangsee Great Reef, is geographically the westernmost point of the Philippines located before and beside the Malaysia–Philippines border in the town of Balabac.

=== Islands ===
The municipality of Balabac is composed of a group of 36 major and minor islands, notable of which are the following:

Major islands

- Balabac (07°57′N 117°01′E)
- Bugsuk (08°15′N 117°18′E)
- Bancalan (08°15′N 117°06′E)
- Mantangule (08°10′N 117°10′E)
- Pandanan (08°17′N 117°13′E)
- Ramos (08°06′N 117°02′E)

Minor islands

- Canabungan
- Candaraman
- Gabung
- Mansalangan (Byan)
- Secam
- Bowen (Mariahangin)
- Lumbucan
- South Mangsee
- North Mangsee
- Salingsingan

=== Shoals and sandbars ===
The municipality of Balabac is composed of various islands located at the Balabac Strait. The strait is known for its shallow waters due to the presence of shoals and numerous sandbars. Balabac has the third and fourth longest sandbars in the Philippines. The third longest is Queen Helen Sandbar at the southern tip of Bugsuk and the fourth is the Angela Sandbar east of Mansalangan.

=== Barangays ===
Balabac is politically subdivided into 20 barangays: Each barangay consists of puroks and some have sitios.

- Agutayan
- Bugsuk (New Cagayancillo)
- Bancalaan
- Indalawan
- Catagupan
- Malaking Ilog
- Mangsee
- Melville
- Pandanan
- Pasig
- Rabor
- Ramos
- Salang
- Sebaring
- Poblacion I
- Poblacion II
- Poblacion III
- Poblacion IV
- Poblacion V
- Poblacion VI

=== Climate ===
Balabac has a tropical monsoon climate (Köppen Am), bordering upon a tropical rainforest climate (Af), with moderate rainfall from February to May and heavy rainfall in the remaining months.

Climate data for Balabac
Month	Jan	Feb	Mar	Apr	May	Jun	Jul	Aug	Sep	Oct	Nov	Dec	Year
Mean daily maximum °C (°F)	28.9 (84.0)	29.3 (84.7)	29.8 (85.6)	30.6 (87.1)	30.9 (87.6)	30.5 (86.9)	30.1 (86.2)	30.3 (86.5)	29.2 (84.6)	29.7 (85.5)	29.5 (85.1)	29.1 (84.4)	29.8 (85.7)
Daily mean °C (°F)	25.3 (77.5)	25.5 (77.9)	25.9 (78.6)	26.5 (79.7)	26.9 (80.4)	26.6 (79.9)	26.2 (79.2)	26.3 (79.3)	25.2 (77.4)	26.0 (78.8)	25.8 (78.4)	25.6 (78.1)	26.0 (78.8)
Mean daily minimum °C (°F)	21.7 (71.1)	21.7 (71.1)	22.0 (71.6)	22.5 (72.5)	23.0 (73.4)	22.7 (72.9)	22.3 (72.1)	22.3 (72.1)	21.3 (70.3)	22.3 (72.1)	22.2 (72.0)	22.1 (71.8)	22.2 (71.9)
Average rainfall mm (inches)	181 (7.1)	71 (2.8)	80 (3.1)	59 (2.3)	121 (4.8)	145 (5.7)	140 (5.5)	146 (5.7)	155 (6.1)	184 (7.2)	260 (10.2)	324 (12.8)	1,866 (73.3)
Source: Climate-Data.org

== Demographics ==
Population census of Balabac

Year	Pop.	±% p.a.
1918	2,109	—
1939	2,760	+1.29%
1948	3,355	+2.19%
1960	4,591	+2.65%
1970	7,912	+5.59%
1975	11,152	+7.13%
1980	15,044	+6.17%
1990	20,056	+2.92%

Year	Pop.	±% p.a.
1995	21,677	+1.47%
2000	25,257	+3.33%
2007	29,622	+2.22%
2010	35,758	+7.09%
2015	40,142	+2.23%
2020	42,527	+1.22%
2024	42,662	+0.08%

Source: Philippine Statistics Authority

In the 2024 census, the population of Balabac was 42,662 people, with a density of 73 inhabitants per square kilometre or 190 inhabitants per square mile.

The original inhabitants were the Molbog people who were the majority, then the Bonggi people who were closely related, then there were also Tausug and Sama immigrants, who were all mentioned as Muslims, there were also Christian Cuyonon, Kagayanen, and Tagalog settlers.

=== Religion ===
As of 2024, based on the religion adhered to by the Balabac population, the majority were Islam (86.3%), followed by Christianity (13.4%), and others (0.3%). Islam is almost entirely practiced by the Moro peoples, such as the Molbog who are indigenous, then the Bonggi, Tausug, and Sama peoples, and some Palawano. Meanwhile, Christianity is mostly practiced by Cuyonon, Kagayanen, Tagalog, and some Palawano settlers.

=== Languages ===
The languages spoken in Balabac are very diverse. Sabah Malay, a Malay-based creole, has primarily been used as a lingua franca for the Muslim population in the region since the time of the Sultanates of Sulu and Brunei, alongside the Tausug language. Continuing into the Spanish colonial era, the migration of people from Luzon, especially Tagalog, also made the language used here, even though it is a non-Tagalog speaking area, with its influence not being very visible among the population, but then it became more and more developed.

Other languages spoken include Molbog language, as the indigenous language of the Molbog Muslims, related to the Bonggi language, which is spoken in their southern islands and the northern coast of Sabah. In addition, there are also Kagayanen people who migrated here and speak their language, Palawano and Sama-Bajau are also used by significant minority speakers. This linguistic diversity is also accompanied by the fact that most of the Balabac population is multilingual, due to its complex history of diversity.

== Economy ==
Poverty incidence of Balabac (%)

Source: Philippine Statistics Authority

== Culture ==
The Molbog people dominate the municipality of Balabac, as well as the municipality of Bataraza in the north. The area is the homeland of the Molbog people since the classical era prior to Spanish colonization. The Molbog are known to have a strong connection with the natural world, especially with the sacred pilandok (Philippine mouse-deer), which can only be found in the Balabac islands. An indigenous folktale tells the story of a naughty Philippine mouse-deer that tricked a prince into giving up his bag of gold while facing a hive of angry bees. Another tale depicts him as a clever guardian of the environment, using his wisdom as an advantage against those who destroy forests, seas, and wildlife. The coconut is especially important in Molbog culture as it is their most prized agricultural crop.

== Transportation ==
Balabac mainland is a three-hour boat trip from Bataraza on the island of Palawan; Bataraza in turn can be reached from Palawan's capital city Puerto Princesa.

An old airstrip located on the island of Bugsuk serves no commercial flights. Another private airstrip is located on the island of Ramos.

== Healthcare ==
- Balabac District Hospital is situated in Barangay Catagupan

== Education ==
The Balabac Schools District Office governs all educational institutions within the municipality. It oversees the management and operations of all private and public, from primary to secondary schools.

=== Primary and elementary schools ===
- Agutayan Elementary School
- Balabac Central School
- Bancalaan Elementary School
- Banglos Elementary School
- Bual Ramos Elementary School
- Caguisan Annex Elementary School
- Caguisan Elementary School
- Calogcog Elementary School
- Catagupan Elementary school
- Dumaga Elementary School
- Indalawan Elementary School
- Kambangtule Elementary School
- Lagdong Elementary School
- Lindagong Elementary School
- Look Dahu Elementary School
- Lumbucan Elementary School
- Madarcos Elementary School
- Malaking Ilog Elementary School
- Malinsuno Elementary School
- Mangsee Elementary School
- Matangule Elementary School
- Marabon Elementary School
- Maria Hangin Elementary School
- Melville Elementary School
- Paliisan Elementary School
- Pampecs Elementary School (Bugsuk Elementary School)
- Panaan Elementary School
- Pasig Elementary School
- Rabor Elementary School
- Segumay Elementary School
- Sibaring Elementary School
- Singcab Elementary School
- Tabodniayo Elementary School
- Timbayan Elementary School
- Turong Elementary School

=== Secondary schools ===
- Agutayan National High School
- Balabac National High School
- Bancalaan National High School
- Bugsuk National High School
- Catagupan High School
- Malaking Ilog National High School
- Mangsee National High School
- Ramos National High School
- Salang National High School
- Sibaring National High School
