= WPU =

WPU may refer to:

- William Paterson University, New Jersey, United States
- Western Philippines University, a public university in Palawan province
