= Aborlan =

Municipality in Palawan, Philippines

- Municipality
- Municipality of Aborlan
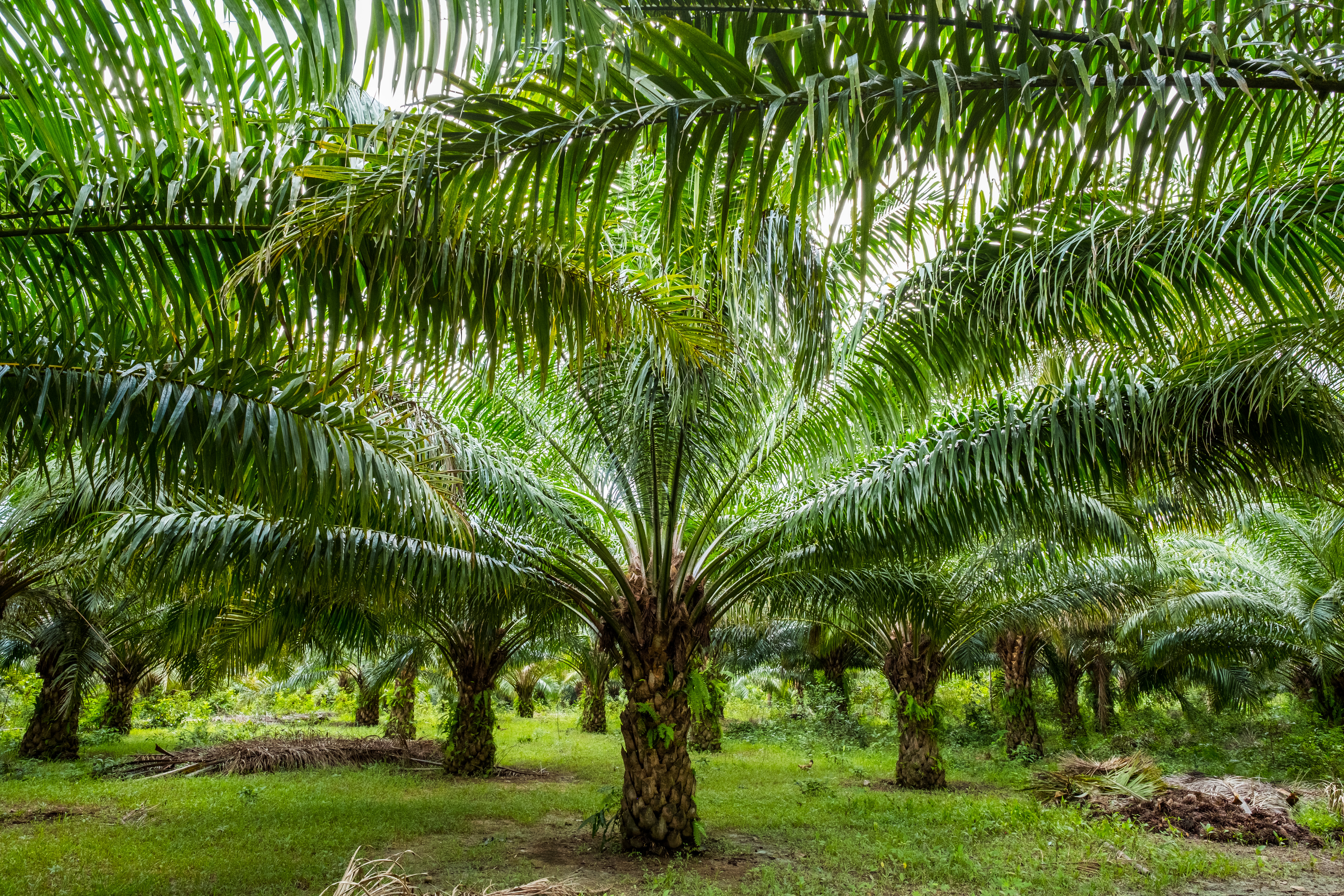
- Palm plantation in Sagpangan, in Aborlan municipality

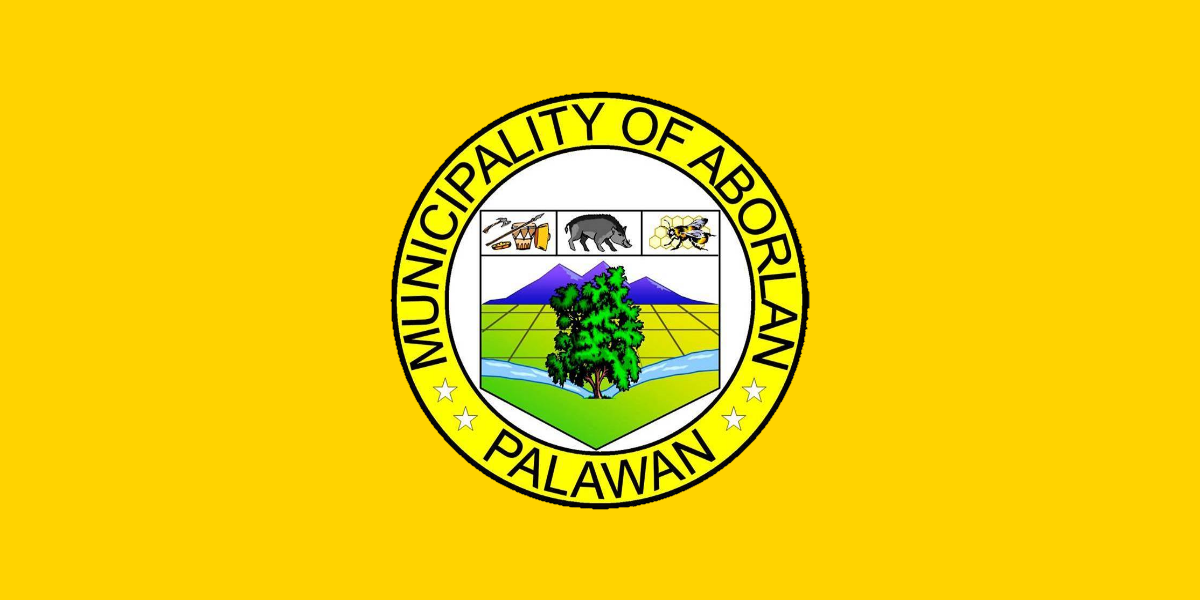
- Flag

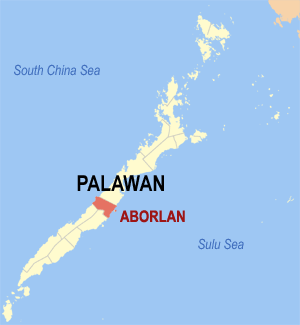
- Map of Palawan with Aborlan highlighted
- Interactive map of Aborlan
- Location within the Philippines
- Coordinates: 9°26′19″N 118°32′53″E
- Country: Philippines
- Region: Mimaropa
- Province: Palawan
- District: 3rd district
- Founded: June 28, 1949
- Barangays: 19 (see Barangays)

Government
  - Type: Sangguniang Bayan
  - Mayor: Lito O. Tito
  - Vice Mayor: Marvin C. Madeja
  - Representative: Gil A. Acosta Jr.
  - Municipal Council: Members: Marissa U. Zumarraga; Alex Pedro P. Peneyra; David C. Mosteiro Jr.; Mamerto N. Chavez; Marvin C. Madeja; Ibandio M. Caralipio; Joel P. Lumis Jr.; Roger B. Jagmis
  - Electorate: 28,433 voters (2025)

Area
  - Total: 807.33 km^{2} (311.71 sq mi)
- Elevation: 210 m (690 ft)
- Highest elevation: 64 m (210 ft)
- Lowest elevation: 0 m (0 ft)

Population (2024 census)
  - Total: 39,972
  - Density: 49.511/km^{2} (128.23/sq mi)
  - Households: 9,715

Economy
  - Income class: 1st municipal income class
  - Poverty incidence: 19.8% (2023)
  - Revenue: ₱ 397.4 million (2024)
  - Assets: ₱ 1,251 million (2024)
  - Expenditure: ₱ 342 million (2024)
  - Liabilities: ₱ 247.1 million (2024)

Service provider
  - Electricity: Palawan Electric Cooperative (PALECO)
- Time zone: UTC+8 (PST)
- ZIP code: 5302
- PSGC: 1705301000
- IDD : area code: +63 (0)48
- Native languages: Aborlan Tagbanwa; Palawano; Tagalog

Aborlan, officially the Municipality of Aborlan (Tagalog: Bayan ng Aborlan), is a municipality in the province of Palawan , Philippines. According to the 2024 census, it has a population of 39,972 people.

It is the province's only town with an agricultural college, now called Western Philippines University. It was founded in 1910.

== Etymology ==
Many stories tell about how the town got its present name:

- Abelnan, a legendary tree of the gods; and
- The English phrase "A Boar Land" that an American man shouted as he noticed the place with wild boars, thus making the place called Aboarland.

== History ==
=== Legend ===
During ancient times, there was a legendary supernatural chief called Biarongbarongan, who lived in the other side of the Iraan River at the present site of the Agricultural High School. He had two sons, namely Baybayaren and Palaysegen. At one time, Biarongbarongan went for a tournament in a foreign land and was defeated. Because of this, he was defeated, and his head was pierced at the plaza. His fierceful son Palaysegen rode an enormous ship with hundreds of followers to avenge his father's death. When he was exhausted in his battle, he alighted in a tree and only his sword and shield continued to fight until he was victorious and went home to Aborlan. One afternoon, an ordinary man and woman happened to meet at the sinful persons, thus he and his family together with his kinds left Aborlan for another virgin land.

=== American era ===
Aborlan was established as a town in 1910 and designated as a municipal district. It was initially organized as a reservation where settlement by Christians was restricted, except for teachers. In 1916, the Tagbanua people were granted the opportunity to govern themselves through a plebiscite, during which they elected their mayor and vice mayor for the first time.

By 1933, the Aborlan River flooded the whole town and some people were carried away by the flood.

=== World War II ===
On May 12, 1942, Japanese forces came to Aborlan, leading to the evacuation of many civilians throughout the hinterlands. They quartered themselves in the Central School building. The Japanese forces garrisoned in this town were not cruel, and as soon as the people learned of this, they returned back to the town. During this period, guerrilla forces became active in southern Palawan and made attacks on public schools in Aborlan.

By late 1944, as soon as the Japanese learned of the American landing at Leyte, the Philippine Constabulary in Aborlan abandoned their posts and joined the guerrillas at Brooke's Point. However, the guerrillas were suspicious of the PC defectors and made them war prisoners, only releasing them 6 months after incarceration.

=== Post-war independence ===
Formerly a municipal district, Aborlan became a municipality on June 28, 1949, by virtue of Executive Order No. 232. In 1951, the municipality lost the barrios of Berong and Alfonso XII when those were transferred to the newly created town of Quezon. By this point, the majority of the inhabitants were still non-Christian.

== Geography ==
It lies in a vast plain between the Sulu Sea and the mountains, 68 kilometres (42 mi) south of Puerto Princesa City.

=== Barangays ===
Aborlan is politically subdivided into 19 barangays. Each barangay consists of puroks and some have sitios.

- Apo-Aporawan
- Apoc-apoc
- Apurawan
- Barake
- Cabigaan
- Culandanum
- Gogognan
- Iraan
- Isaub
- Jose Rizal
- Mabini
- Magbabadil
- Plaridel
- Poblacion
- Ramon Magsaysay
- Sagpangan
- San Juan
- Tagpait
- Tigman

=== Climate ===
Climate data for Aborlan, Palawan
Month	Jan	Feb	Mar	Apr	May	Jun	Jul	Aug	Sep	Oct	Nov	Dec	Year
Mean daily maximum °C (°F)	29 (84)	30 (86)	31 (88)	31 (88)	30 (86)	30 (86)	29 (84)	29 (84)	30 (86)	29 (84)	29 (84)	29 (84)	30 (85)
Mean daily minimum °C (°F)	23 (73)	23 (73)	24 (75)	25 (77)	26 (79)	26 (79)	25 (77)	25 (77)	25 (77)	25 (77)	25 (77)	24 (75)	25 (76)
Average precipitation mm (inches)	73 (2.9)	68 (2.7)	96 (3.8)	104 (4.1)	193 (7.6)	246 (9.7)	225 (8.9)	199 (7.8)	213 (8.4)	250 (9.8)	226 (8.9)	143 (5.6)	2,036 (80.2)
Average rainy days	15.4	13.7	17.8	19.4	27.0	28.5	29.1	27.8	28.3	28.5	25.6	21.8	282.9
Source: Meteoblue

== Demographics ==
Population census of Aborlan

Year	Pop.	±% p.a.
1918	2,734	—
1939	5,780	+3.63%
1948	6,351	+1.05%
1960	17,530	+8.83%
1970	8,880	−6.57%
1975	10,452	+3.32%
1980	11,799	+2.45%
1990	18,751	+4.74%

Year	Pop.	±% p.a.
1995	21,650	+2.73%
2000	25,540	+3.61%
2007	27,953	+1.25%
2010	32,209	+5.29%
2015	35,091	+1.65%
2020	38,736	+2.10%
2024	39,972	+0.76%

Source: Philippine Statistics Authority

In the 2024 census, the population of Aborlan was 39,972 people, with a density of 50 inhabitants per square kilometre or 130 inhabitants per square mile.

== Economy ==
Poverty incidence of Aborlan

Source: Philippine Statistics Authority

== Culture ==
The town celebrates the Rakudan Festival (Palawano for 'gathering in an agreed place') annually every June. It features the lechon or roast pig which references the theory of the town's name origin coming from the phrase "a boar land".

== Education ==
There are three schools district offices which govern all educational institutions within the municipality. They oversee the management and operations of all private and public, from primary to secondary schools. These are the Aborlan Central Schools District, Aborlan East Schools District, and Aborlan West Schools District.

=== Primary and elementary schools ===
- Aborlan Bible Baptist Christian School
- Aborlan Central School
- Aborlan Forerunners International Academy
- Apis Elementary School
- Aplaya Elementary School
- Apo-aporawan Elementary School
- Apoc-apoc Elementary School
- Apurawan Elementary School
- Barake Elementary School
- Bible Missionary Christian School
- Bubusawin Elementary School
- Cabigaan Elementary School
- Cornelio Gonzaga Elementary School (Dilat Elementary School)
- Culandanum Elementary School
- Daan Elementary School
- Fellowship Christian Academy
- Global Summit School
- Gogognan Elementary School
- Iraan Elementary School
- Isaub Elementary School
- Jose Rizal Elementary School
- Mabini Elementary School
- Magbabadil Elementary School
- Mailigan Elementary School
- Marikit Elementary School
- Plaridel Elementary School
- Ramon Magsaysay Elementary School
- Sagpangan Elementary School
- San Juan Elementary School
- Sitio Morzon Elementary School
- Sombrero Elementary School
- St. Therese of the Child Jesus Mission School
- Sto. Niño Elementary School
- Tagpait Elementary School
- Tigman Elementary School
- Tina Elementary School
- Valderama Elementary School
- Valleyside Christian School

=== Secondary schools ===
- Aborlan National High School
- Apurawan National High School
- Bubusawin National High School
- Cabigaan National High School
- Culandanum National High School
- Iraan-Sagpangan National High School
- Isaub National High School
- Isla Sombrero National High School
- Jose Rizal-Apoc-Apoc National High School
- Magbabadil National High School
- Marcelo A. Bantug National High School
- Plaridel National High School

=== Higher educational institution ===
- Western Philippines University
