= Palawan =

Province in Mimaropa, Philippines

- Province
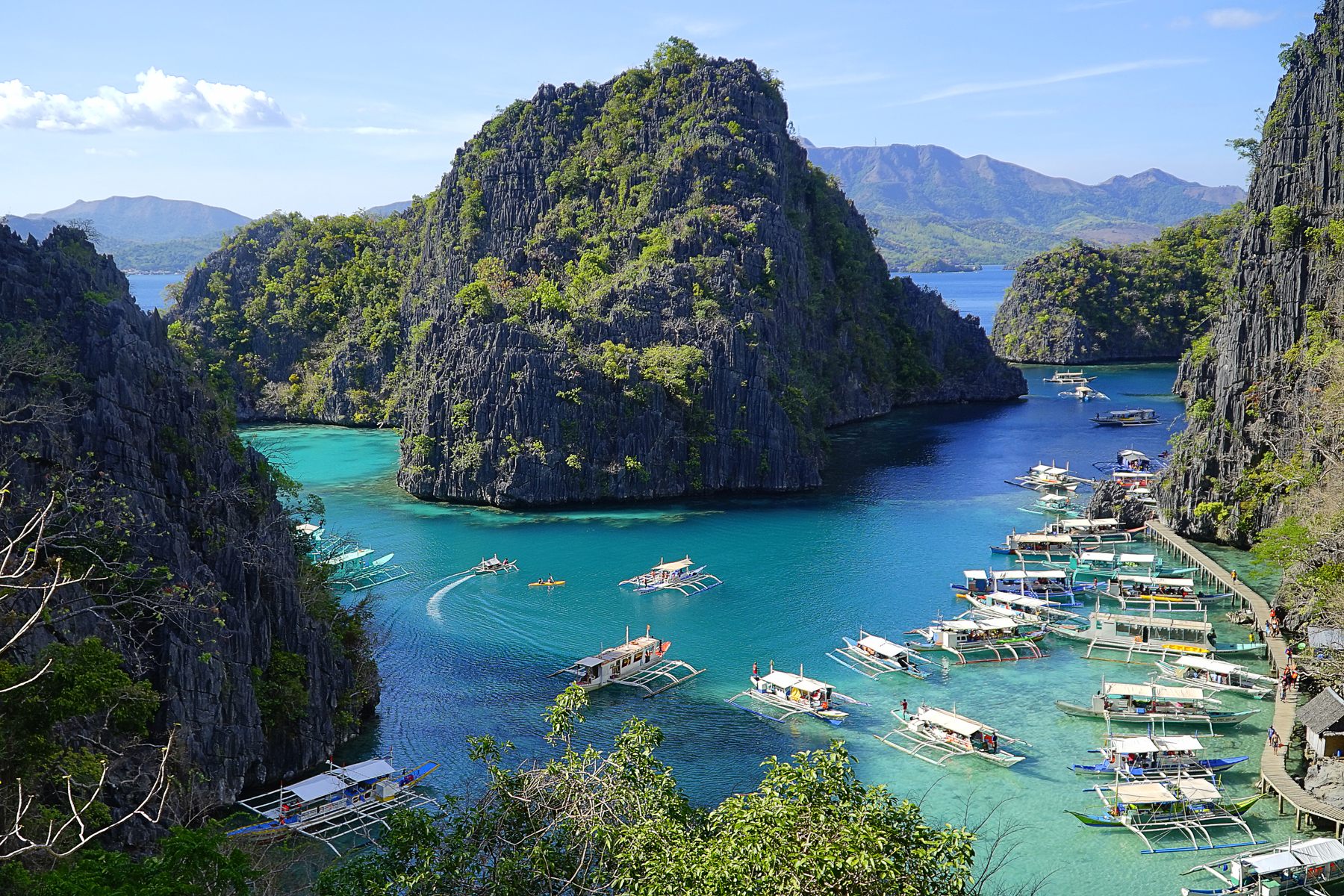
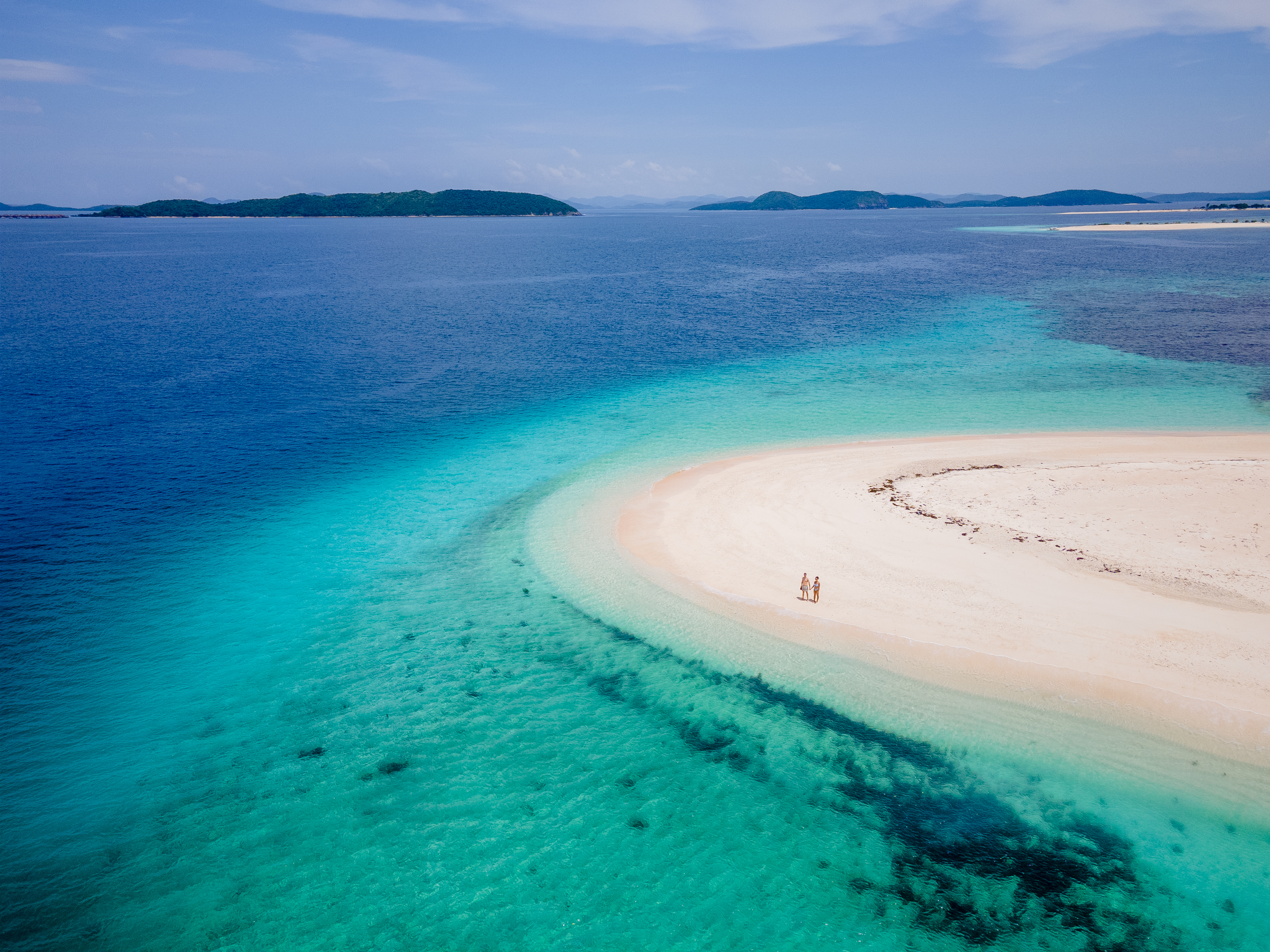
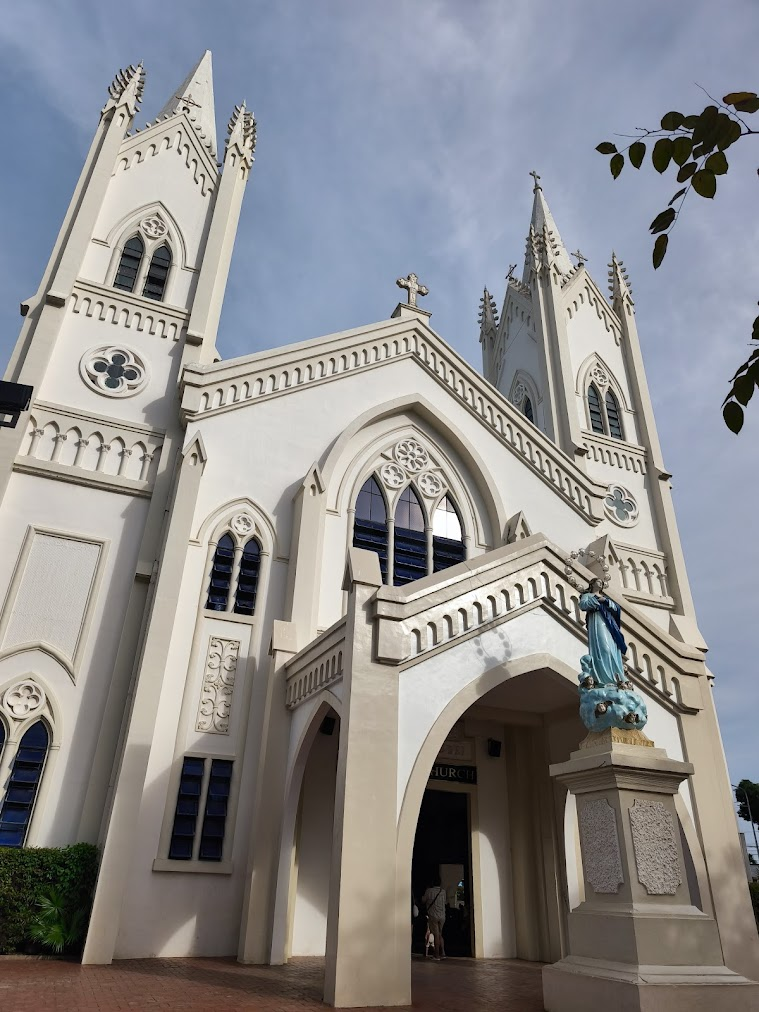
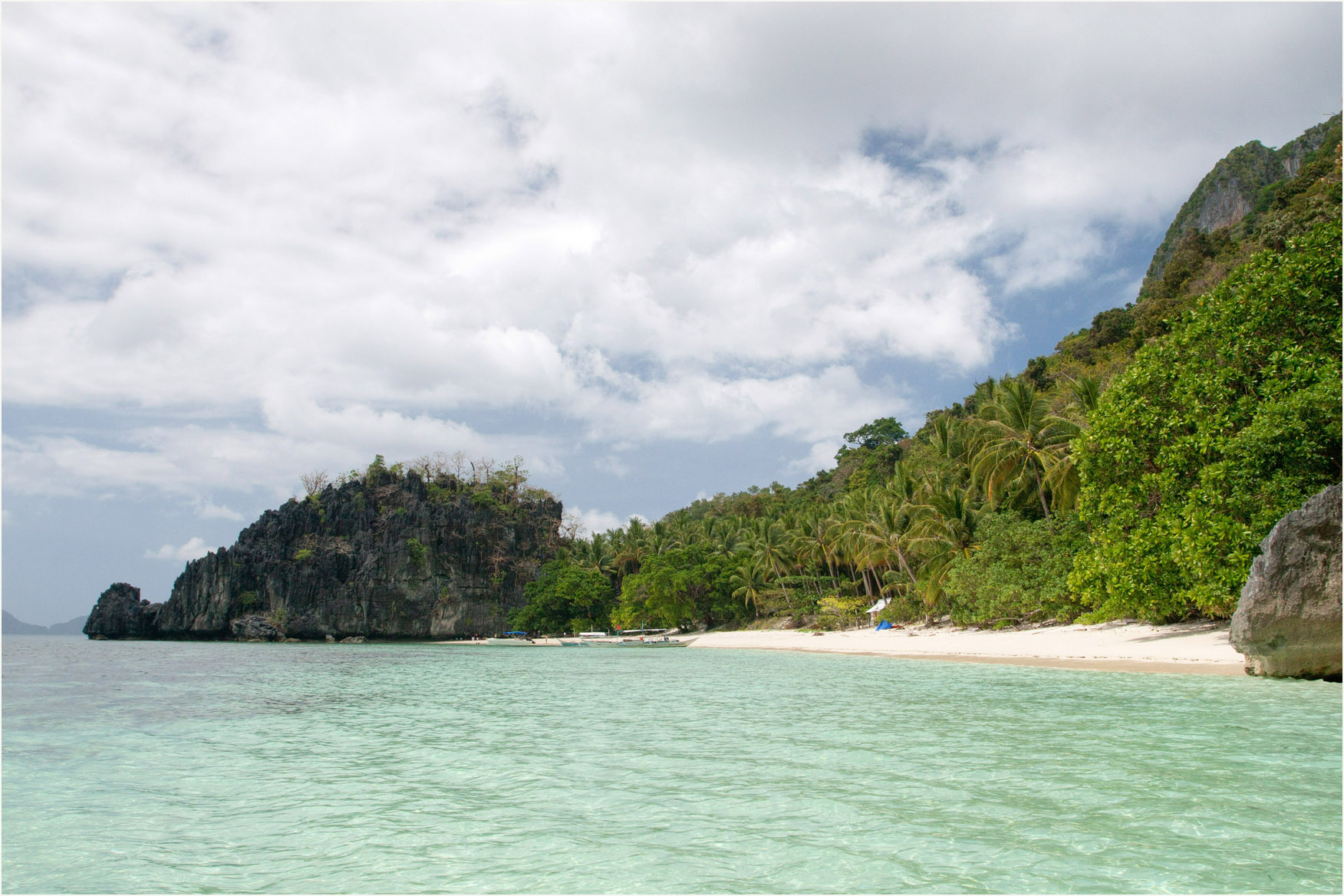
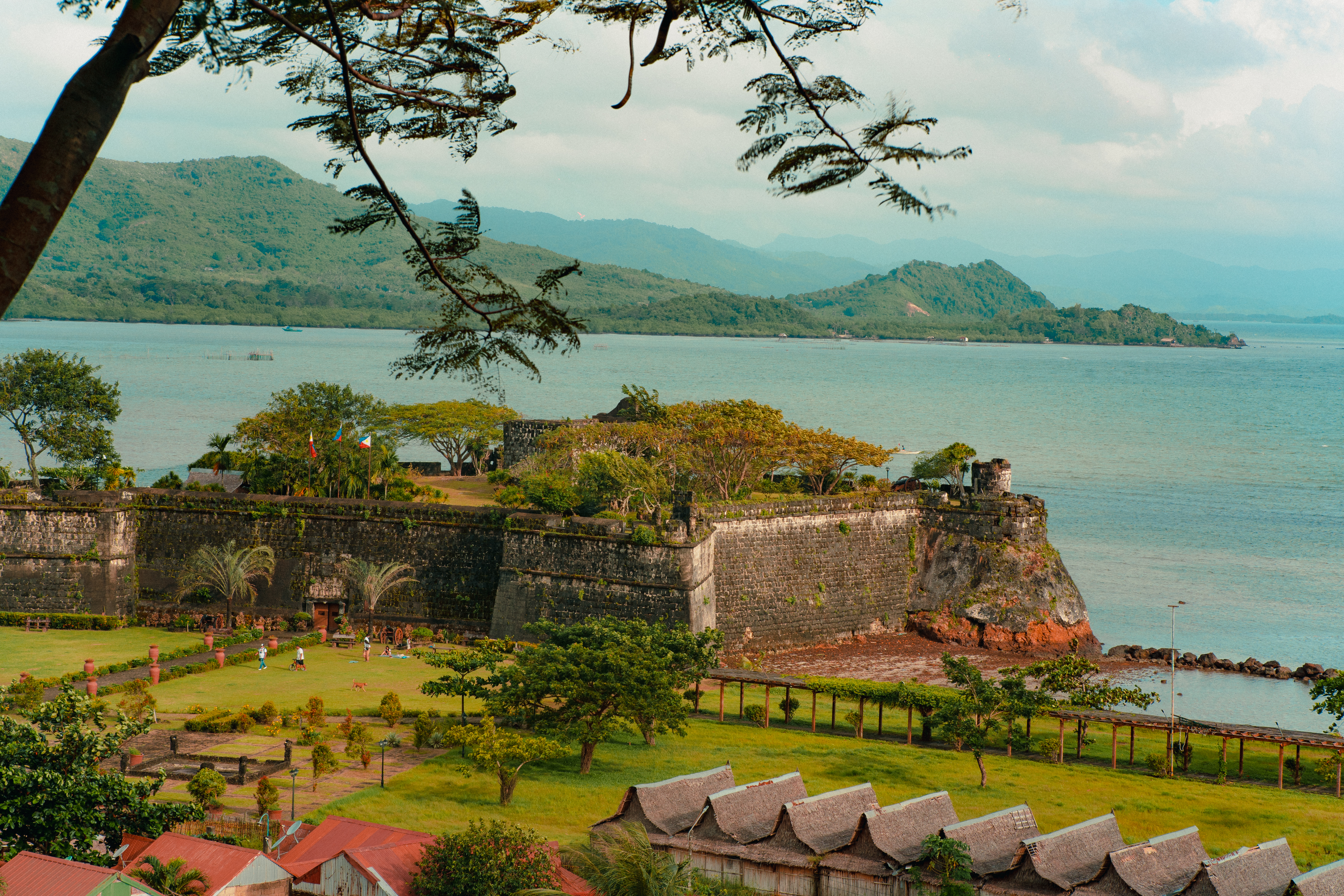
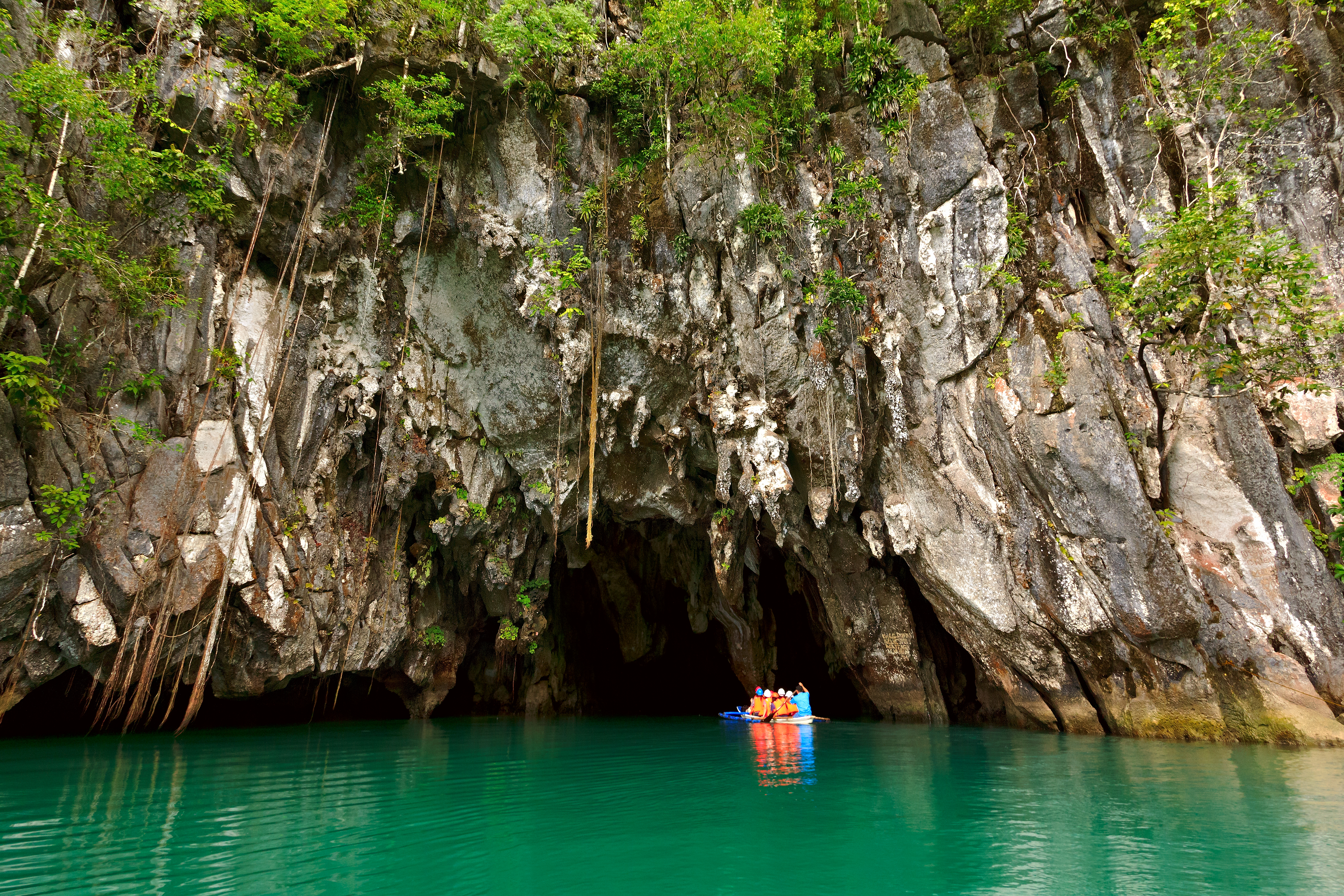
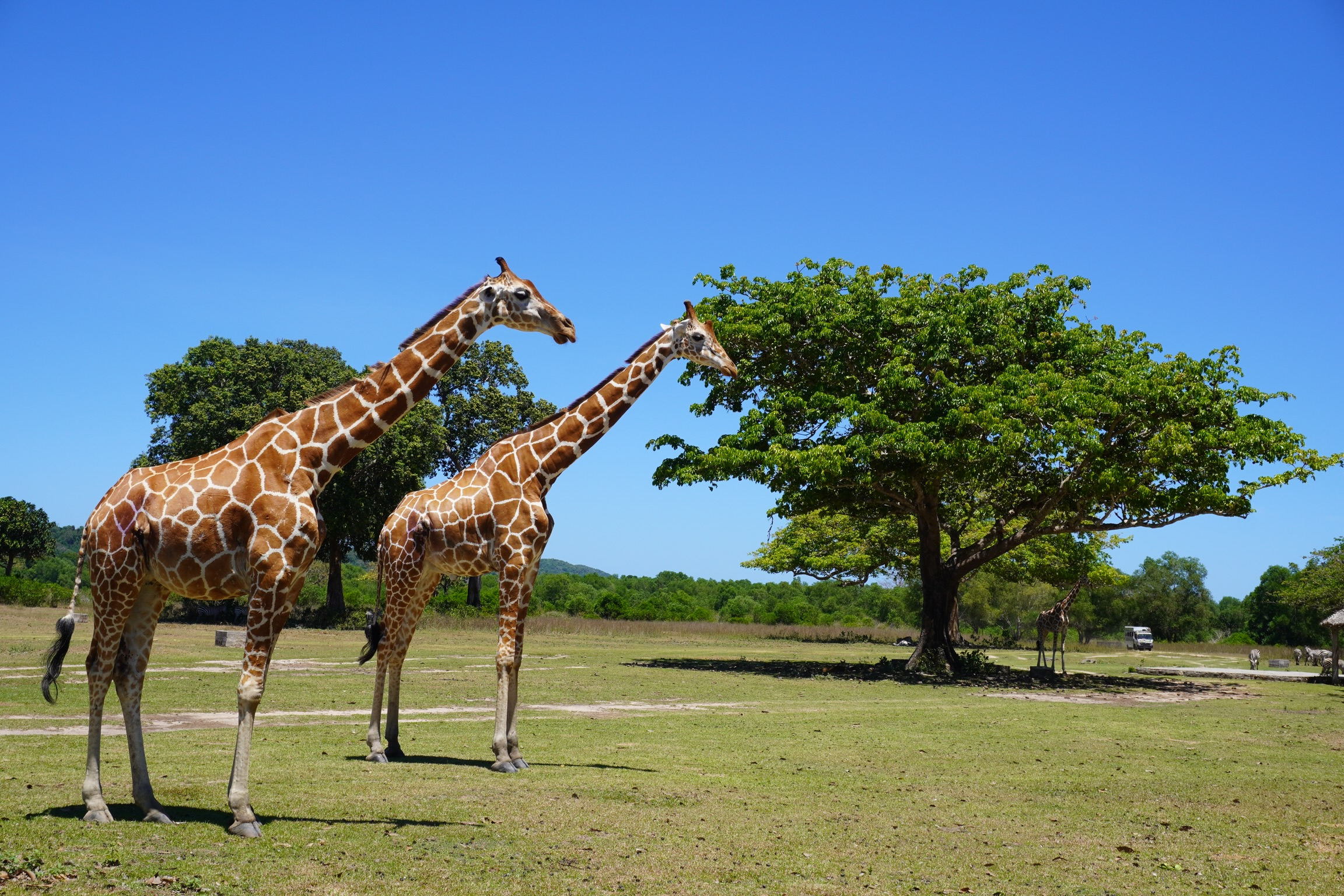
- Clockwise from the top: Coron Island, Busuanga, Bataraza Grand Mosque, Fort Santa Isabel, Calauit Safari Park, Puerto Princesa Subterranean River National Park, El Nido, and Puerto Princesa Cathedral

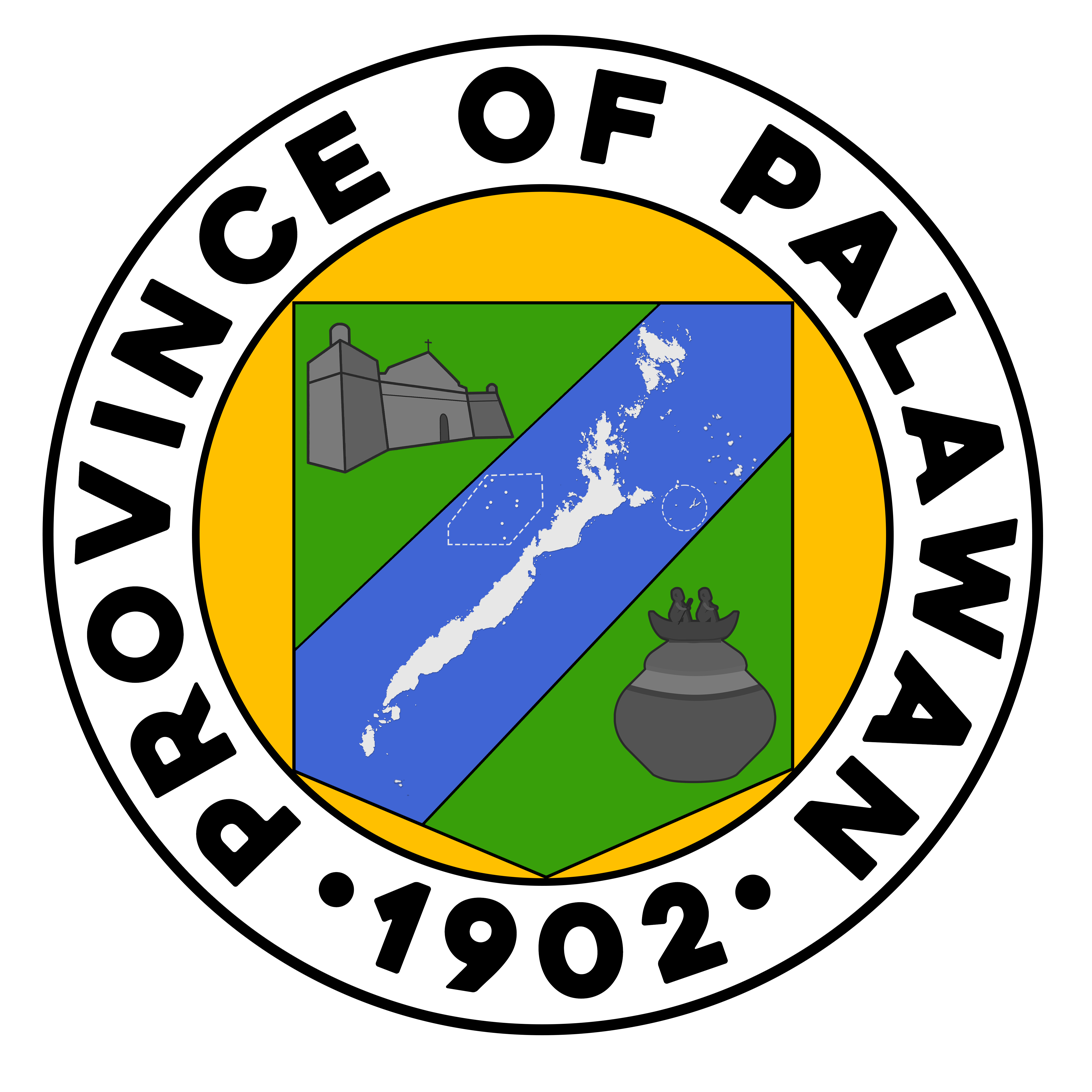
- Flag Seal
- Nicknames: The (Spaniards') Land of Promise; Philippines' Best Island; Philippines' Last Frontier
- Location in the Philippines
- Interactive map of Palawan
- Coordinates: 10°00′N 118°50′E
- Country: Philippines
- Region: Mimaropa (in transition)
- Founded: 1818
- Capital and largest city: Puerto Princesa*

Government
  - Type: Sangguniang Panlalawigan
  - Governor: Amy R. Alvarez (PPP)
  - Vice Governor: Leoncio N. Ola (PPP)
  - Legislature: Palawan Provincial Board
  - Electorate: 787,755 voters (2025)

Area
  - Total: 14,649.73 km^{2} (5,656.29 sq mi)
  - Rank: 1st out of 82
- (excludes Puerto Princesa)
- Highest elevation (Mount Mantalingajan): 2,086 m (6,844 ft)

Population (2024 census)
  - Total: 968,795
  - Rank: 28th out of 82
  - Density: 66.1306/km^{2} (171.277/sq mi)
  - Rank: 80th out of 82
  - Households: 230,836
- (excludes Puerto Princesa)
- Demonyms: Palaweño; Palawanense

Divisions
  - Independent cities: 1: Puerto Princesa*
  - Component cities: 0
  - Municipalities: 23: Aborlan; Agutaya; Araceli; Balabac; Bataraza; Brooke's Point; Busuanga; Cagayancillo; Coron; Culion; Cuyo; Dumaran; El Nido; Kalayaan; Linapacan; Magsaysay; Narra; Quezon; Rizal; Roxas; San Vicente; Sofronio Española; Taytay
  - Barangays: 367; including independent cities: 433
  - Districts: Legislative districts of Palawan (shared with Puerto Princesa City)

Economy
  - Income class: 1st provincial income class
  - Poverty incidence: 15.8% (2023)
  - Revenue: ₱ 4,970 million (2024)
  - Assets: ₱ 20,644 million (2024)
  - Expenditure: ₱ 4,308 million (2024)
  - Liabilities: ₱ 7,386 million (2024)
- Time zone: UTC+8 (PHT)
- PSGC: 175300000
- IDD : area code: +63 (0)48
- ISO 3166 code: PH-PLW
- Spoken languages: Tagalog; Cuyonon; Cebuano; Agutaynen; Kinaray-a; Palawano; Hiligaynon; Molbog; Batak; Aborlan Tagbanwa; Calamian Tagbanwa; Central Tagbanwa; Kagayanen; Tausūg; Sabah Malay; English
- Website: www.palawan.gov.ph
- * Puerto Princesa is a highly-urbanized city, politically independent from Palawan.

Palawan (/pə.ˈlɑː.wən/, pə-LAH-wən; Tagalog: [pɐˈlaː.wan]; officially the Province of Palawan; Cuyonon: Probinsya i'ang Palawan; Tagalog: Lalawigan ng Palawan) is an archipelagic province of the Philippines that is located in the region of Mimaropa. It is the largest province in the country in terms of total area, with 14,649.73 km^{2} (5,656.29 mi^{2}). The capital and largest city is Puerto Princesa which is geographically grouped with but administered independently from the province. Palawan is known as the Philippines' Last Frontier and as the Philippines' Best Island.

The islands of Palawan stretch between Mindoro island in the northeast and Borneo in the southwest. It lies between the South China Sea and the Sulu Sea. The province is named after its largest island, Palawan Island, measuring 450 kilometers (280 mi) long, and 50 kilometers (31 mi) wide.

In 2019, it was proposed to divide Palawan into three separate provinces, though the proposal was rejected by the local population in a 2021 plebiscite.

== History ==
=== Pre-history ===
The early history of Palawan was determined by a team of researchers led by Robert Bradford Fox. They found evidence in the Tabon Caves that humans have lived in Palawan for more than 50,000 years. They also found human bone fragments, from an individual known as Tabon Man, in the municipality of Quezon, as well as tools and other artifacts.

Two articulated phalanx bones of a tiger, besides another phalanx piece, were found amidst an assemblage of other animal bones and stone tools in Ille Cave near the village of New Ibajay. The other animal fossils were ascribed to macaques, deer, bearded pigs, small mammals, lizards, snakes and turtles. From the stone tools, besides the evidence for cuts on the bones, and the use of fire, it would appear that early humans had accumulated the bones. Additionally, the condition of the tiger subfossils, dated to approximately 12,000 to 9,000 years ago, differed from other fossils in the assemblage, dated to the Upper Paleolithic. The tiger subfossils showed longitudinal fracture of the cortical bone due to weathering, which suggests that they had post-mortem been exposed to light and air. Tiger parts were commonly used as amulets in South and Southeast Asia, so it may be that the tiger parts were imported from elsewhere, as is the case with tiger canine teeth, which were found in Ambangan sites dating to the 10th to 12th centuries in Butuan, Mindanao. On the other hand, the proximity of Borneo and Palawan also makes it likely that the tiger had colonized Palawan from Borneo before the Early Holocene.

Using the work of Von den Driesch, all chosen anatomical features of appendicular elements' anatomical features which were chosen, besides molars, were measured to distinguish between taxa that had close relationships, and see morphometric changes over ages, though not for pigs or deer. For the latter two, cranial and mandibular elements, besides teeth of deer from Ille Cave were compared with samples of the Philippine brown deer (Cervus mariannus), Calamian hog deer (Axis calamianensis), and Visayan spotted deer (Cervus alfredi), and thus two taxa of deer have been identified from the fossils: Axis and Cervus. Remains of pigs were compared with the Eurasian (Sus scrofa) and Palawanese wild boar (Sus ahoenobarbus). It is known that the Eurasian wild boar was imported as a domesticate to the islands from mainland Southeast Asia to the islands during the Terminal Holocene.

Palawan was a major site for the Maritime Jade Road, one of the most extensive sea-based trade networks of a single geological material in the prehistoric world, operating for 3,000 years from 2000 BCE to 1000 CE.

=== Early history ===
Palawan is home to several Indigenous groups. The oldest inhabitants are the Palaw'an, Batak, Tagbanwa, and Tau't Bato who are from the interiors and highlands of Palawan, as well as the Calamianes Islands. They traditionally practice animist anito religions. Palawan's coastlines were also settled by later groups that are now collectively known as "Palaweños". Prior to Islamization, the islands of Palawan, Calamian, and parts of Luzon were under the jurisdiction of the nation Sandao (in Chinese records, in the 1200s). Sandao was a vassal-state to the more powerful Ma-i nation in Mindoro. Thereafter, groups including the Islamized Molbog people of southern Palawan (possibly originally from Sabah), and the Cuyonon and Agutaynon groups (from the nearby islands of Cuyo and Agutaya settled in.

Palawan was mentioned as "Pulaoan" or "Polaoan" by Antonio Pigafetta in 1521 during Magellan's expedition. They called it la terra de missione ("the land of promise") due to the fact that they were almost starving by the time they reached the island. The local datu made peace with the expedition through a blood compact. The ships' crews were welcomed to the island with rice cooked in bamboo tubes, rice wine, bananas, pigs, goats, chickens, coconuts, sugarcane, and other supplies. Pigafetta described the inhabitants as being farmers. Their primary weapons were blowguns with iron tips that could both shoot thick wooden or bamboo darts (some poisoned) and function as spears once their ammunition were exhausted. Pigafetta also described the islanders as keeping roosters for cockfighting.

Before the arrival of the Spanish in the late 15th century, Palawan broke free of the nation of Ma-i but would be conquered and ruled by the Bruneian empire and their vassals the Sultanate of Sulu.

=== Spanish colonial era ===
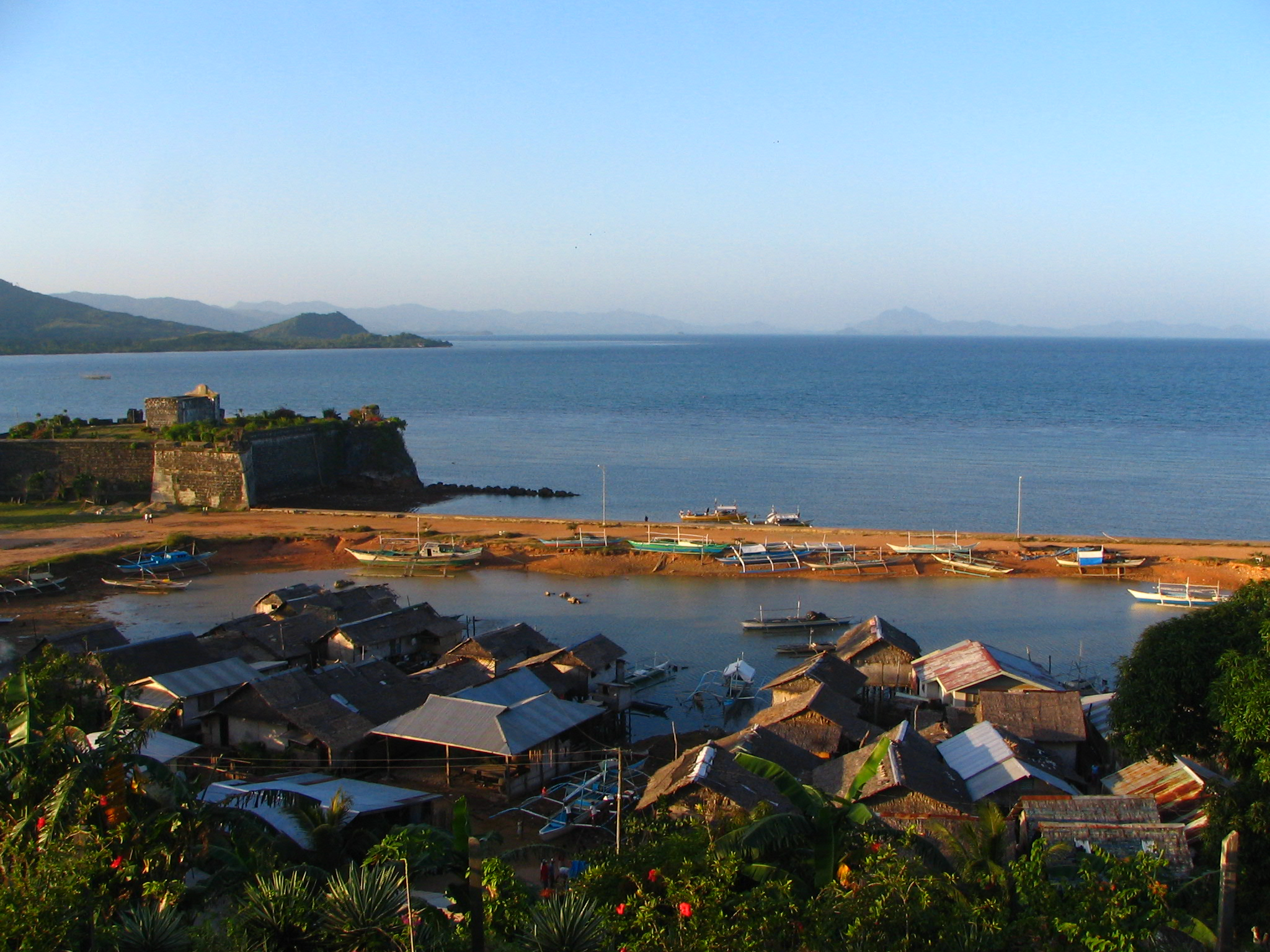
Taytay, the capital of the Province of Calamianes in 1818 (Spanish Palawan)

The northern Calamianes Islands were the first to come under Spanish authority, and were later declared a province separate from the Palawan mainland. In the early 17th century, Spanish friars sent out missions in Cuyo, Agutaya, Taytay and Cagayancillo but they met resistance from Moro communities. Before the 18th century, Colonial Authorities began to build churches enclosed by garrisons for protection against Moro raids in the towns of Cuyo, Taytay, Linapacan and Balabac. In 1749, the Sultanate of Brunei ceded southern Palawan to Spain. The 1818 Spanish census showed, that when Palawan was then called the "Isla de Paragua" and was under the jurisdiction of the Calamianes islands to the north, the census recorded Palawan island to have had 4,486 native families and 29 Spanish-Filipino families.

By 1858, the province was divided into two provinces, namely, Castilla, covering the northern section with Taytay as capital and Asturias in the southern mainland with Puerto Princesa as capital. It was later divided into three districts, Calamianes, Paragua and Balabac, with Principe Alfonso town as its capital. During the Spanish colonial period, Cuyo became the second capital of Palawan from 1873 to 1903. On 6 April 1885, Sultan Abdul Momin of Brunei made confirmation of a cession on the island of Palawan to Alfred Dent of the British North Borneo Chartered Company (NBCC) and partners on the day of 29 December 1877. A month before, on 7 March 1885, the British, Spanish, and German colonial authorities signed the Madrid Protocol of 1885, which established the definite border of Spanish influence in the Mindanao islands and beyond northern Borneo.

=== American colonial era ===
In 1902, after the Philippine–American War, the United States established civil rule in northern Palawan, calling it the province of Paragua. In 1905, pursuant to Philippine Commission Act No. 1363, the province was reorganized to include the southern portions and renamed Palawan, and Puerto Princesa declared as its capital.

Together with Mindanao, Palawan was part of an acquisition proposal in 1910 between then-United States ambassador to Denmark Maurice Francis Egan and several of his Danish friends. Under the proposal, the United States was to trade Mindanao and Palawan to Denmark for Greenland and the Danish West Indies, and Denmark could then trade Palawan and Mindanao to German Empire for Northern Schleswig, which was then under German rule. Egan's suggestion faded away when World War I erupted, and Denmark eventually regained Northern Schleswig after the German defeat in World War I following the 1920 Schleswig plebiscites.

Many reforms and projects were later introduced in the province. Construction of school buildings, promotion of agriculture, and bringing people closer to the government were among the priority plans during this era.

=== Japanese invasion ===
After the Japanese invasion, according to Stephen L. Moore, "Pro-Allied sentiment was strong, and it was later estimated that during the war as many as 1,154 Filipino guerrillas worked against the Japanese on the island. Those in the underground network would proudly refer to themselves as 'Palawan's Fighting One Thousand'." Early resistance leaders included Dr. Higinio Acosta Mendoza, his wife Triny, Thomas F. Loudon, and his son-in-law Nazario Mayor. Capt. Mayor organized Company D in October 1943, and was responsible for the area encompassing Puerto Princesa south to Balabac Island. Capt. Mendoza covered the area north of Puerto Princesa to Caramay. Lt. Felipe Batul operated out of Danlig, while Capt. Carlos Amores operated out of Sibaltan. Overall command of the Palawan Special Battalion was under Major Pablo P. Muyco as part of the 6th Military District. The Palawan guerrillas helped any escaping American POWs, supported two coastwatcher groups sending regular radio broadcasts to General MacArthur on Japanese movements, and helped rescue downed airmen as well as survivors from the submarine USS Flier. Most importantly, they helped guide the 8th Army's troop landings.

==== Palawan Massacre ====
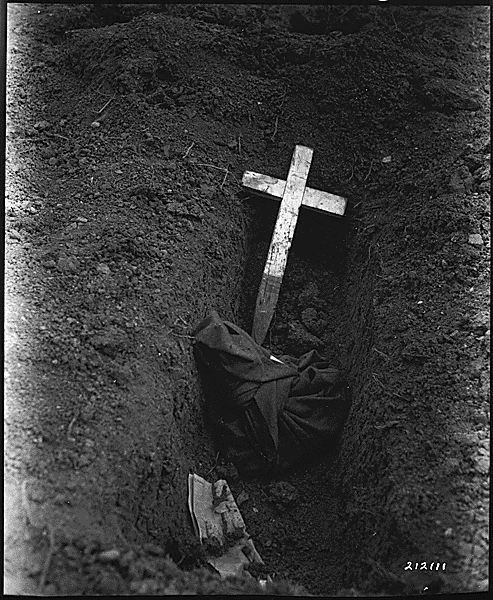
U.S. Army personnel worked to identify the charred remains of Americans captured at Bataan and burned alive on Palawan. March 20, 1945

During World War II, in order to prevent the rescue of prisoners of war by the advancing allies, on December 14, 1944, units of the Japanese Fourteenth Area Army (under the command of General Tomoyuki Yamashita) herded the remaining 150 prisoners of war at Puerto Princesa into three covered trenches which were then set on fire using barrels of gasoline. Prisoners who tried to escape the flames were shot down. Only 11 men escaped the slaughter.

==== Liberation ====
During the first phase of the Battle of Leyte Gulf, just off the coast of Palawan, two United States Navy submarines, USS Dace and USS Darter attacked a Japanese cruiser task force led by Admiral Takeo Kurita, sinking his flagship (in which he survived) Atago, and her sister ship Maya. Darter later ran aground that afternoon and was scuttled by USS Nautilus (SS-168).

The island was liberated from the Japanese Imperial Forces from February 28 to April 22, 1945, during the Invasion of Palawan.

=== Martial law era ===
Like the other parts of the Philippines, Palawan felt the impact when Ferdinand Marcos placed the whole country under martial law in September 1972, and then held on to power for 14 more years, until he was ousted by the 1986 EDSA People Power revolution.

One incident was when Marcos evicted an estimated 254 families of Indigenous Tagbanwa people from the Calauit Island in order to create a game reserve full of animals imported from Africa.

In another incident, residents of Bugsuk Island were driven from their homes and communities so that Marcos' crony Eduardo Cojuangco could establish a coconut plantation.

Among the leaders who helped organize the effort to prevent the eviction of the Bugsuk Island residents was United Methodist Reverend Magnifico Osorio. When the effort failed, Reverend Osorio relocated to Bataraza, a town on the southernmost tip of Palawan Island, where he continued to fight for the rights of the Indigenous peoples of Palawan. In March 1985 he successfully facilitated a meeting between Indigenous peoples and the provincial governor at that time Salvador Paredes Socrates, who promised to respect Indigenous rights as long as he was governor. A few weeks later, however, Reverend Osorio was found dead out in his ricefields, having been clubbed in the head and shot dead. For his work to protect the Indigenous peoples of Palawan, and for the circumstances of his death, Reverend Osorio was honored by having his name inscribed on the Wall of Remembrance at the Philippines' Bantayog ng mga Bayani, which honors the martyrs and heroes who fought the abuses of the Marcos dictatorship.

The Marcos era was a time of significant deforestation in Palawan and throughout the Philippines, with the forest cover of the Philippines shrinking until only 8% remained. In Palawan, one major company given a Timber License Agreements (TLA) to cut down trees during Martial Law was Palawan-Apitong Corp, which was owned by Juan Ponce Enrile. Enrile was the government official Ferdinand Marcos put in place to approve Timber License Agreements during Martial Law.

=== Contemporary ===
In 2005, Palawan was briefly made politically part of Western Visayas or Region VI through Executive Order 429 signed by then-President Gloria Macapagal Arroyo on May 23 as a political move to control the province and a response to getting more loans from China. This decree was later deferred on August 18 within the same year reportedly due to the opposition of the province's Sangguniang Panlalawigan (Provincial Council).

On July 21, 2007, its capital city Puerto Princesa became a highly urbanized city.

In April 2019, a bill dividing Palawan into three provinces was passed into law. The proposed three new provinces were Palawan del Norte, Palawan Oriental, and Palawan del Sur. Some civil society groups and Puerto Princesa residents opposed the proposed division, claiming that there was no extensive public consultation. The Comelec announced on March 16, 2021, that the majority of Palawan residents opposed the division in the plebiscite held on March 13, 2021.

Local Palaweño officials on January 6, 2026 opposed Palawan's inclusion in Mindanao, in response to a resolution by some figures in Cagayan de Oro referencing "Minsupala" union (Mindanao–Sulu–Palawan) should the island group secede from the rest of the country. They denounced the inclusion of the province in a map that the said personalities planned to submit to the United Nations Special Committee on Decolonization. Board member Ryan Maminta asserted that "Minsupala" was never a political and legal entity, rather it was only an anthropological term "illustrating the connections and trade routes during the pre-colonial period".

== Geography ==
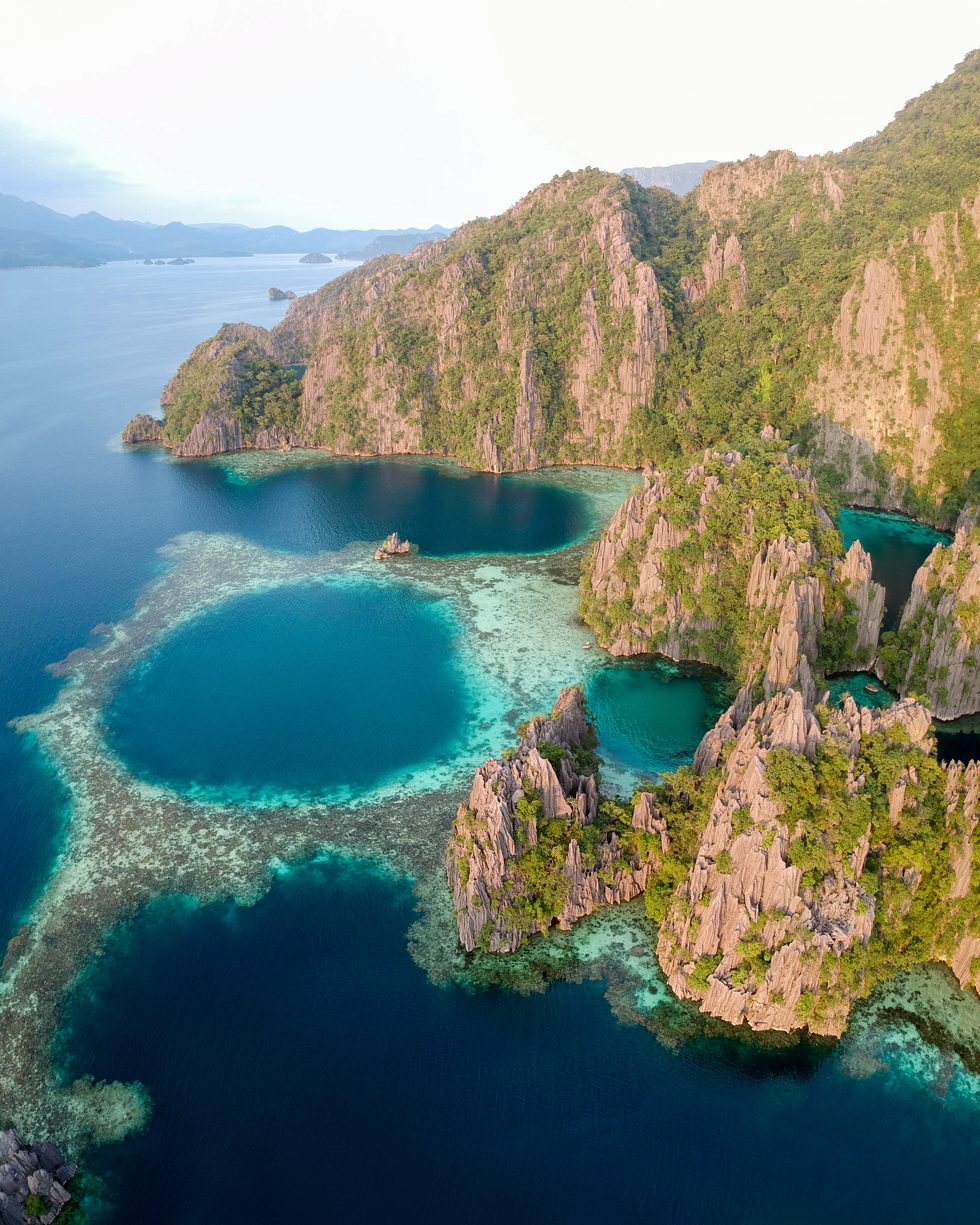
Coron Island

The province is composed of the long and narrow Palawan Island, plus a number of other smaller islands surrounding it, totalling roughly 1,780 islands and islets. The Calamianes Group of Islands to the northeast consists of Busuanga, Coron, Culion, and Linapacan islands. Balabac Island is located off the southern tip, separated from Borneo by the Balabac Strait. In addition, Palawan covers the Cuyo Islands in the Sulu Sea. The disputed Spratly Islands, located a few hundred kilometers to the west, are considered part of Palawan by the Philippines, and is locally called the "Kalayaan Group of Islands".

Palawan's almost 2,000 kilometers (1,200 mi) of irregular coastline is lined with rocky coves and sugar-white sandy beaches. It also harbors a vast stretch of virgin forests that carpet its chain of mountain ranges. The mountain heights average 1,100 meters (3,500 ft) in altitude, with the highest peak rising to 6,843 feet (2,086 m) at Mount Mantalingahan. The vast mountain areas are the source of valuable timber. The terrain is a mix of coastal plain, craggy foothills, valley deltas, and heavy forest interspersed with riverine arteries that serve as irrigation.

The province has a total land area of 14,649.73 square kilometers (5,656.29 sq mi). When Puerto Princesa City is included for geographical purposes, its land area is 17,030.75 square kilometers (6,575.61 sq mi). The land area is distributed to its mainland municipalities, comprising 12,239 square kilometers (4,726 sq mi), and the island municipalities, which altogether measure 2,657 square kilometers (1,026 sq mi). In terms of archipelagic internal waters, Palawan has the biggest marine resources that covers almost half of the Sulu Sea and a big chunk of the South China Sea that is within the municipal waters of Kalayaan Municipality which was officially annexed to the Philippine jurisdiction by virtue of Presidential Decree 1596 dated June 11, 1978.

=== Climate ===
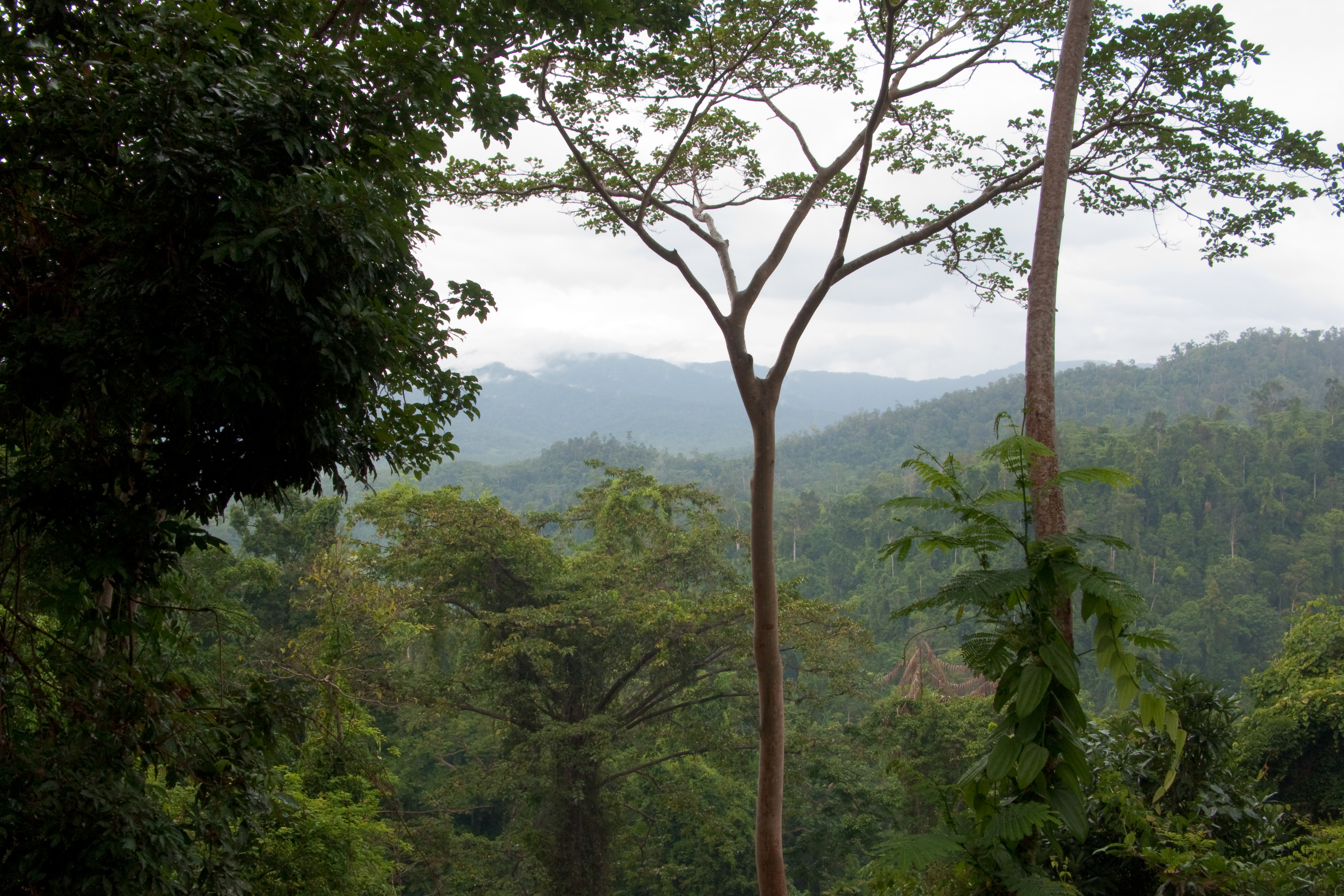
Primary tropical moist rainforest in central Palawan

The province has two types of climate. The first, which occurs in the northern and southern extremities and the entire western coast, has two distinct seasons – eight months dry and seven months wet. The other, which prevails in the eastern coast, has a short dry season of one to three months and no pronounced rainy period during the rest of the year. The southern part of the province is virtually free from tropical depressions but northern Palawan experiences torrential rains during the months of July and August. Summer months serve as peak season for Palawan. Sea voyages are most favorable from March to early June when the seas are calm. The average maximum temperature is 31 °C (88 °F) with largre variation all year.

The land ecosystem of Palawan is threatened by climate change. For example, though mangroves and barrier reefs protect Puerto Princesa's coastlines from supertyphoons, these barriers are subject to degradation due to El Niño, rising sea temperatures, and other climate change-related phenomena. A study by the World Wide Fund for Nature revealed that a spike in ocean acidification in 2010 came from Palawan's waters.

=== Administrative divisions ===
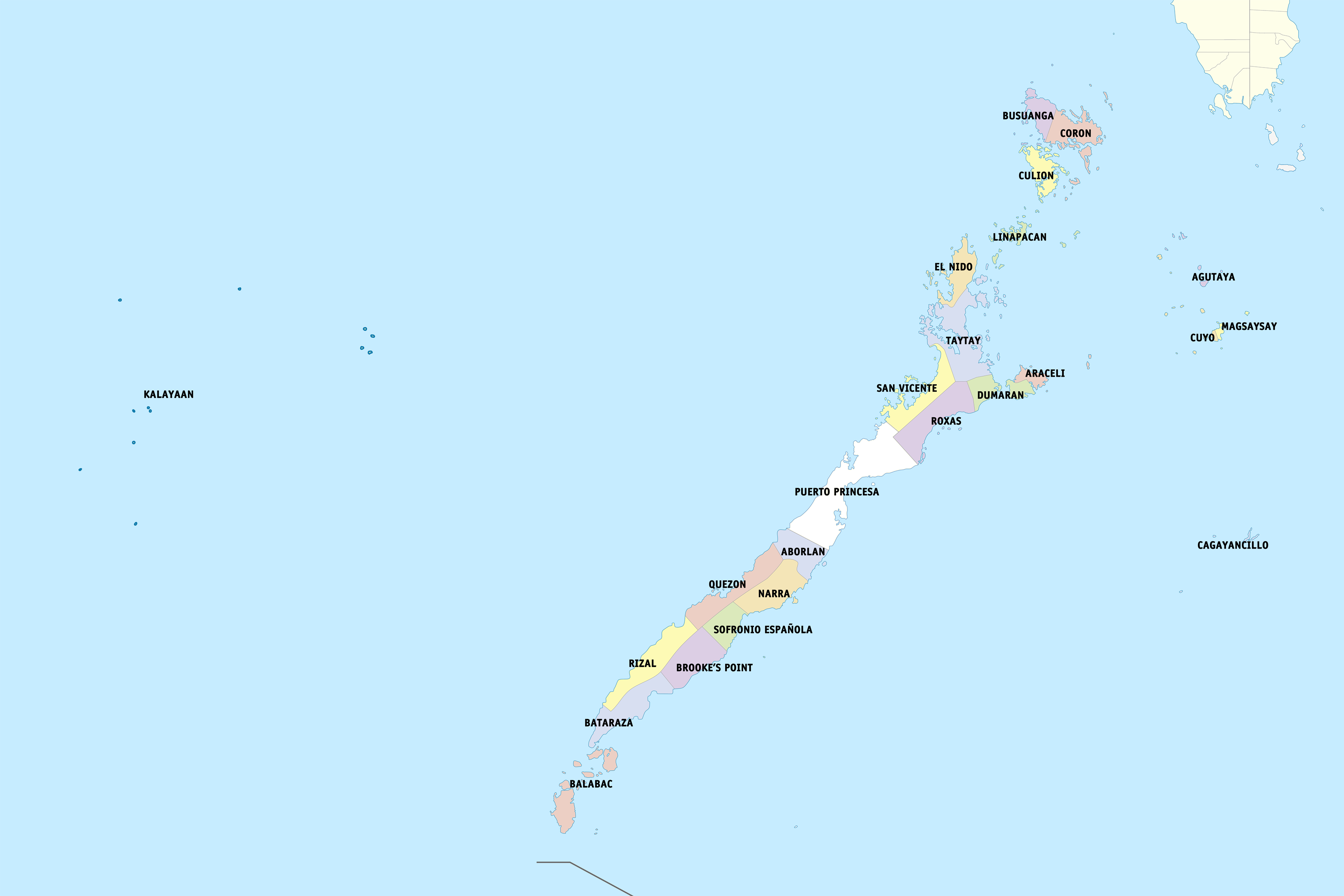
Political map of Palawan

Palawan comprises 433 barangays in 23 municipalities and the capital City of Puerto Princesa. As an archipelago, Palawan has 13 mainland municipalities and 10 island towns. There are three congressional districts, namely: the first district comprising five northern mainland municipalities and nine island towns; the second district composed of six southern mainland towns and the island municipality of Balabac; and the third district covering the capital City of Puerto Princesa and the town of Aborlan. Thirteen municipalities are considered as mainland municipalities, namely Aborlan, Narra, Quezon, Sofronio Española, Brooke's Point, Rizal, and Bataraza (located south); San Vicente, Roxas, Dumaran, El Nido, and Taytay (found in the north). The remaining island municipalities are: Busuanga, Coron, Linapacan and Culion (forming the Calamianes group of islands), Cuyo, Agutaya and Magsaysay (the Cuyo group of islands), Araceli, Cagayancillo, Balabac and Kalayaan (Spratly Islands). The capital, Puerto Princesa is a highly urbanized city that governs itself independently from the province, but it usually grouped with the province for statistical and geographic purposes.

- † Provincial capital and highly urbanized city
- Municipality

City or municipality		Location	District	Population			±% p.a.	Area		Density		Barangay	Coordinates^{[A]}
				(2020)		(2015)		km^{2}	sq mi	/km^{2}	/sq mi		
Aborlan		Mainland	3rd	4.1%	38,736	35,091	1.90%	807.33	311.71	48	120	19	9°26′14″N 118°32′54″E
Agutaya		Island	1st	1.4%	12,867	12,545	0.48%	37.31	14.41	340	880	10	11°09′04″N 120°56′22″E
Araceli		Island	1st	1.5%	14,434	14,909	−0.61%	204.30	78.88	71	180	13	10°33′13″N 119°59′21″E
Balabac		Island	2nd	4.5%	42,527	40,142	1.10%	581.60	224.56	73	190	20	7°59′12″N 117°03′49″E
Bataraza		Mainland	2nd	9.1%	85,439	75,468	2.39%	726.20	280.39	120	310	22	8°40′20″N 117°37′41″E
Brooke's Point		Mainland	2nd	7.9%	73,994	66,374	2.09%	1,303.40	503.25	57	150	18	8°46′25″N 117°50′10″E
Busuanga		Island	1st	2.7%	25,617	22,046	2.90%	392.90	151.70	65	170	14	12°08′00″N 119°56′10″E
Cagayancillo		Island	1st	0.7%	6,884	6,285	1.75%	26.39	10.19	260	670	12	9°34′37″N 121°11′50″E
Coron		Island	1st	7.0%	65,855	51,803	4.68%	689.10	266.06	96	250	23	11°59′56″N 120°12′22″E
Culion		Island	1st	2.5%	23,213	20,139	2.74%	499.59	192.89	46	120	14	11°53′26″N 120°01′19″E
Cuyo		Island	1st	2.5%	23,489	22,360	0.94%	84.95	32.80	280	730	17	10°50′55″N 121°00′49″E
Dumaran		Mainland	1st	2.5%	23,528	23,734	−0.17%	435.00	167.95	54	140	16	10°31′35″N 119°46′13″E
El Nido		Mainland	1st	5.9%	50,494	41,606	3.76%	923.26	356.47	55	140	18	11°10′46″N 119°23′29″E
Kalayaan		Island	1st	0.0%	193	184	0.91%	290.00	111.97	0.67	1.7	1	11°03′12″N 114°17′09″E
Linapacan		Island	1st	1.7%	16,424	15,668	0.90%	195.44	75.46	84	220	10	11°29′28″N 119°52′06″E
Magsaysay		Island	1st	1.3%	12,603	12,196	0.63%	49.48	19.10	250	650	11	10°51′52″N 121°03′01″E
Narra		Mainland	2nd	8.3%	77,948	73,212	1.20%	831.73	321.13	94	240	23	9°16′10″N 118°24′14″E
Puerto Princesa	†	Mainland	3rd	—	307,079	255,116	3.59%	2,381.02	919.32	130	340	66	9°44′24″N 118°44′24″E
Quezon		Mainland	2nd	6.9%	65,283	60,980	1.31%	943.19	364.17	69	180	14	9°14′12″N 117°59′29″E
Rizal		Mainland	2nd	6.0%	56,162	50,096	2.20%	1,256.47	485.13	45	120	11	9°01′49″N 117°38′29″E
Roxas		Mainland	1st	7.4%	69,624	65,358	1.21%	1,177.56	454.66	59	150	31	10°19′11″N 119°20′35″E
San Vicente		Mainland	1st	4%	33,507	31,232	1.35%	1,462.94	564.84	23	60	10	10°31′44″N 119°15′17″E
Sofronio Española		Mainland	2nd	4.0%	37,416	32,876	2.49%	473.91	182.98	79	200	9	8°58′01″N 117°59′41″E
Taytay		Mainland	1st	8.9%	83,357	75,165	1.99%	1,257.68	485.59	66	170	31	10°49′32″N 119°31′00″E
Total^{[B]}					939,594	849,469	1.94%	14,649.73	5,656.29	64	170	433	(see GeoGroup box)
1. Coordinates mark the city/town center, and are sortable by latitude.; 2. Total figures exclude the highly urbanized city of Puerto Princesa.

=== Proposals ===
==== Inclusion into other regions ====
In 2001, the residents of Palawan voted in a plebiscite to reject inclusion into an expanded Autonomous Region in Muslim Mindanao.

On May 17, 2002, Executive Order No. 103 divided Region IV into Region IV-A (Calabarzon) and Region IV-B (Mimaropa), placing the province of Palawan into Mimaropa.

On May 23, 2005, Executive Order No. 429 directed that Palawan be transferred from Region IV-B to Region VI. However, Palaweños criticized the move, citing a lack of consultation, with most residents in Puerto Princesa City and all municipalities but one preferring to stay with Region IV-B. Consequently, Administrative Order No. 129 was issued on August 19, 2005, that the implementation of EO 429 be held in abeyance pending approval by the President of its implementation Plan. The Philippine Commission on Elections reported the 2010 Philippine general election results for Palawan as a part of the Region IV-B results. As of 30 June 2011, the abeyance was still in effect and Palawan remained a part of Mimaropa.

==== Proposed division into three provinces ====
A March 2021 plebiscite (originally scheduled for May 2020 but delayed due to the COVID-19 pandemic) asked about whether to divided Palawan into three provinces: Palawan del Norte (including El Nido, Taytay, Coron, Linapacan, Culion, and Busuanga), Palawan Oriental (includes San Vicente, Roxas, Dumaran, Cuyo, Agutaya, Magsaysay, and Cagayancillo), and Palawan del Sur (includes Kalayaan, Aborlan, Narra, Sofronio Española, Brooke's Point, Rizal, Quezon, Bataraza and Balabac). The division was rejected by a majority.

== Demographics ==
Population census of Palawan

Year	Pop.	±% p.a.
1903	35,696	—
1918	69,053	+4.50%
1939	93,673	+1.46%
1948	106,269	+1.41%
1960	162,669	+3.61%
1970	198,861	+2.03%

Year	Pop.	±% p.a.
1975	254,356	+5.06%
1980	311,548	+4.14%
1990	436,140	+3.42%
1995	510,909	+3.01%
2000	593,500	+3.26%
2007	682,152	+1.94%

Year	Pop.	±% p.a.
2010	771,667	+4.59%
2015	849,469	+1.85%
2020	939,594	+2.15%
2024	968,795	+0.74%

(excluding Puerto Princesa City)
Source: Philippine Statistics Authority

The population of Palawan in the 2024 census was 968,795 people, with a density of 66 inhabitants per square kilometre or 170 inhabitants per square mile.

=== Religion ===
Religiously, the drastic increase in Christianity is related to the increase in the number of migrants, especially those from Luzon, who are increasingly coming to Palawan. In 2000, Islam in Palawan was 23.6%, a percentage that decreased drastically in 2020 to 10.83%, along with the arrival of Christian settlers. Previously, almost half of the population in Palawan was Muslims, almost all of them indigenous people, especially Molbog and Southern Palawano.

==== Roman Catholicism ====
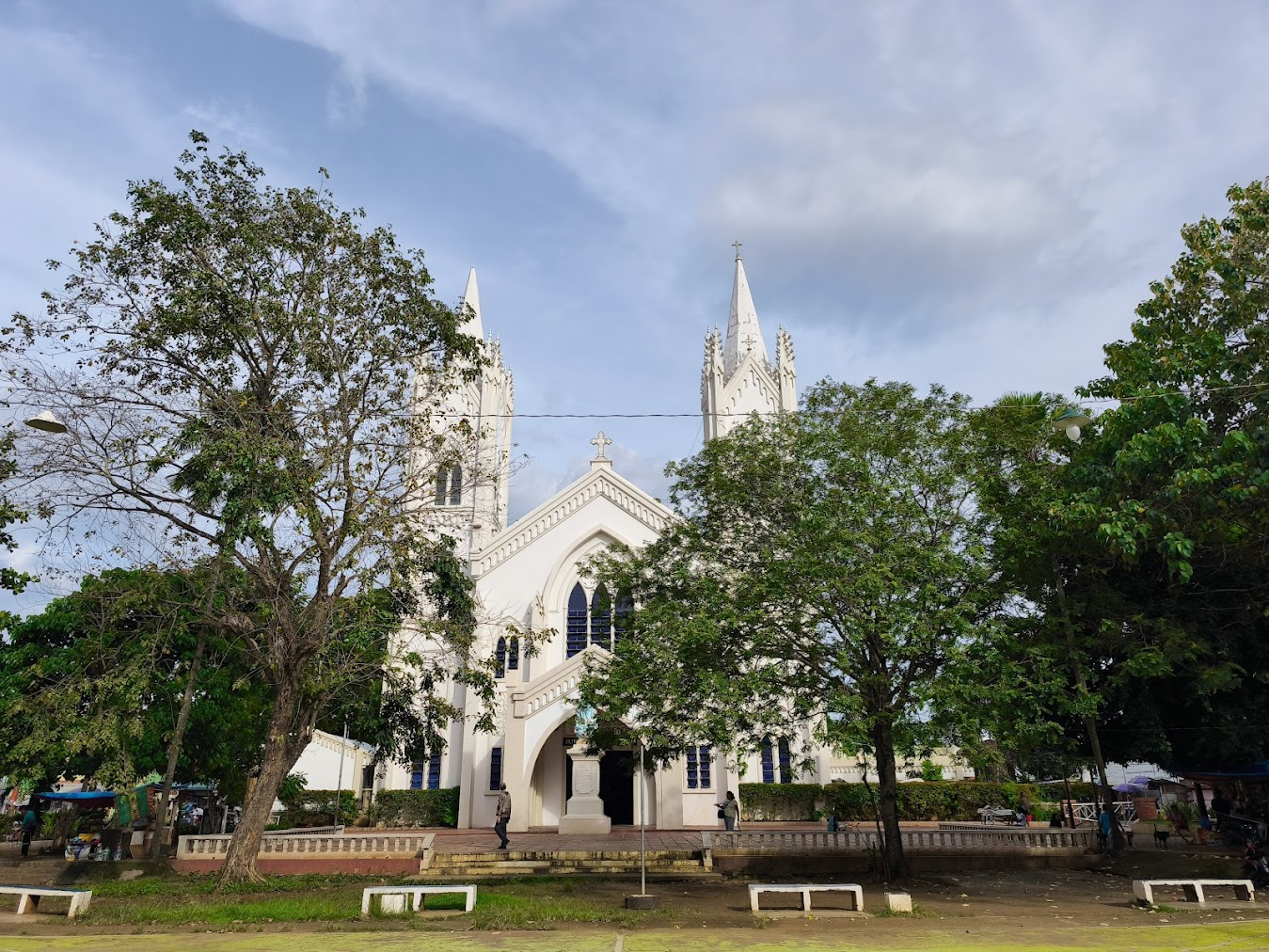
Immaculate Conception Cathedral in Puerto Princesa, November 2025.

The predominant religion in Palawan is Roman Catholicism. In 2017, the Roman Catholic Apostolic Vicariate of Puerto Princesa had a 68.8% adherence while the Roman Catholic Apostolic Vicariate of Taytay (Northern Palawan) had a 91.6% adherence. One of the religious orders that had a significant mission in the islands is the Order of Augustinian Recollects.

The Catholics in the province are governed by a single apostolic vicariate until 2002 when it was divided into two: the Apostolic Vicariate of Puerto Princesa in Southern Palawan and the Apostolic Vicariate of Taytay in Northern Palawan.

==== Protestantism and other groups ====
Several Baptist and other Protestant denominations have a strong presence in Palawan as do the Church of the Foursquare Gospel in the Philippines, and the Seventh-day Adventists. Charismatic groups such as Jesus is Lord (JIL), Jesus Touch Fellowship (JTF) and the Life Church (formerly known at the Life Renewal Center).

The Members Church of God International (MCGI) popularly called Ang Dating Daan established four church districts namely Calamian (Consisting of island municipalities in the North), Central (Consisting of Puerto Princesa City), North (Consisting of Northern municipalities) & South (Consisting of Southern municipalities) which signifies strong membership in the province.

Other Christian denominations including the indigenous Iglesia ni Cristo has many local congregations in the province established three Ecclesiastical District (Calamian, Palawan North, and Palawan South) each town has a barangay chapels signifies the existence of INC Faith, 2-3% of the entire province belongs to INC. The United Church of Christ in the Philippines or (UCCP), the Jesus Miracle Crusade, the Pentecostal Missionary Church of Christ or PMCC (4th Watch) as well as the Iglesia Filipina Independiente (Philippine Independent Church or Aglipayan Church) which is standing as one diocese (The Diocese of Palawan). The Church of Jesus Christ of Latter-day Saints has a growing membership in the island province. Jehovah's Witnesses have an active membership of 181,236 in the Philippines as of 2012. Special pioneers from the Witnesses have been preaching to prisoners at the Iwahig Prison and Penal Farm in Palawan, and were permitted to build a small Kingdom Hall right on the premises.

==== Islam ====
Around 75,000 to 100,000 Palawan residents (10% to 13%) identify as Muslims, these being mostly the native Molbog and Palawano who are majority in Balabac and Bataraza, also significant in Rizal and Brooke's Point, of the southern part of the island. Large numbers of Jama Mapun (Mapun Island) and Tausug (Sulu) migrants have also settled in southern Palawan, as well as a smaller number of Sama Pangutaran (Tawi-Tawi), Maranao (Lanao del Sur), and Yakan (Basilan). Maranao traders are more widely scattered throughout urban centers in Palawan, while the Yakan are mostly centered in the Rio Tuba area of Bataraza.

==== Animism ====
Most of the ethnic minorities such as Batak and Tagbanwa are traditionally animists, many of which have continued to preserve their ancient traditions passed on by their ancestors and onto the next generations. However, Christian missionaries have been active in some communities, reducing the prevalence of historic beliefs.

==== Other religions ====
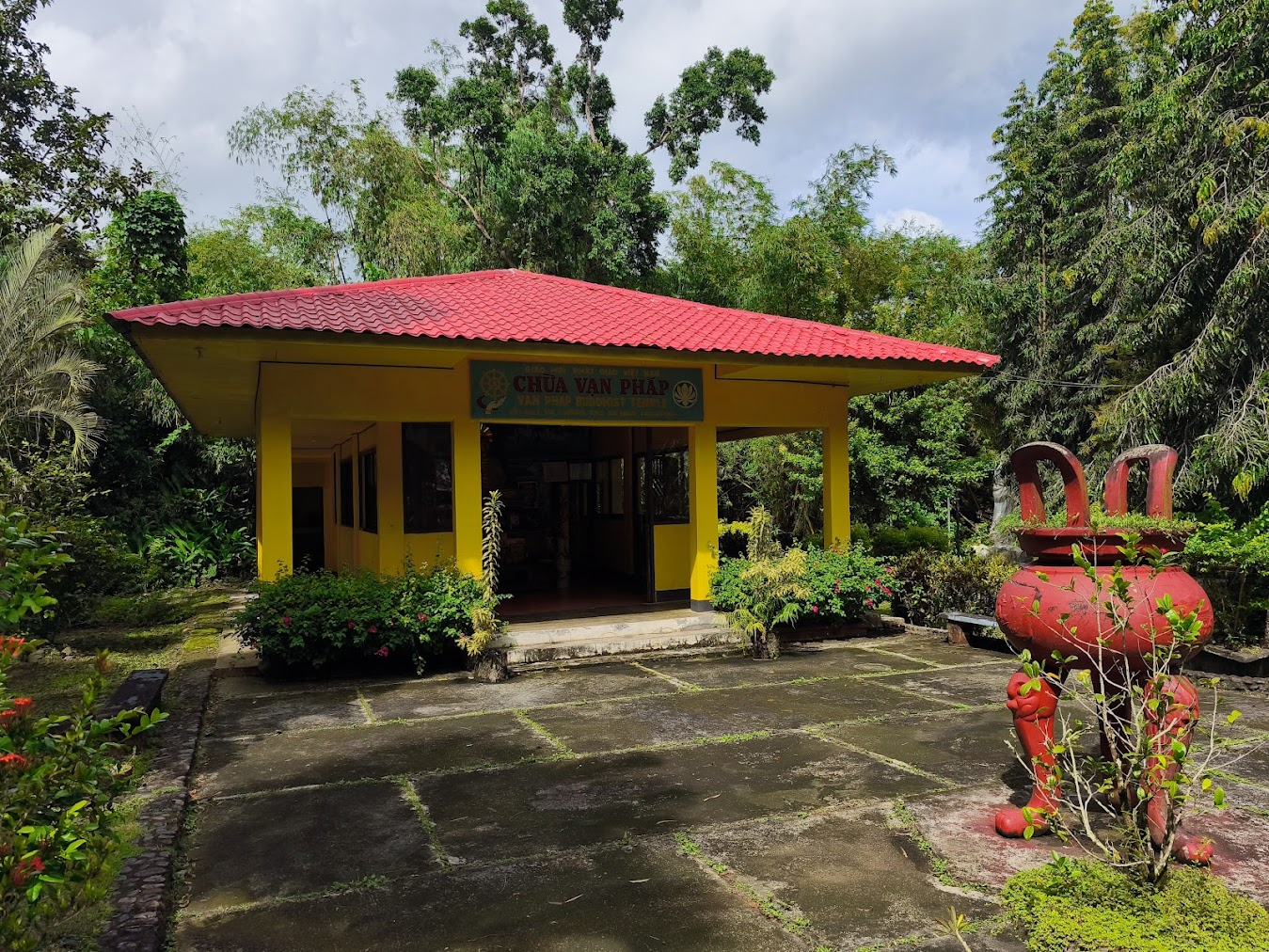
Chùa Vạn Pháp, a Vietnamese Buddhist temple in Puerto Princesa

A notable Buddhist Temple in Palawan is Chùa Vạn Pháp. The temple was built by Vietnamese refugees. They were temporarily settled in Palawan during the Indochina refugee crisis, while they awaited permanent resettlement to third countries. Almost all of the refugees have moved on to other countries in 2005 and 2006.

=== Language ===
Spoken languages in Palawan
Languages	percentage
Tagalog	50%
Cuyonon	27%
Kinaray-a	19%
Palawano	4%

There are 52 languages and dialects in the province, with Tagalog being spoken by more than 50 percent of the people. Languages native to the islands are Cuyonon (26.27 percent) and Palawano (4.0 percent). Kinaray-a is also present in Palawan, spoken by 19 percent of inhabitants. Before mass immigration to Palawan by various groups of people from Southern Tagalog, Ilocandia, Central Luzon, and Panay, Cuyonon was an established lingua franca amongst many of Palawan's native peoples, including the Agutaynen, Cagayanen, Tagbanua, Palawan, and others. The usage of Cuyonon significantly dropped during 1990s and the approach of the new millennium, being replaced by the now-majority Tagalog language, the reason for making Palawan part of Southern Tagalog. Tagalog may be usually spoken with Batangas dialect due to its geographical contact with Batangas and Mindoro and Batangueño residents in the island. In Barangay Panitian, Quezon, Palawan, Sambal language is spoken by ethnic Sambals, who came from northern Zambales during the 1950s. In the south of Palawan during the occupation of the Sulu Sultanate, Tausug was a lingua franca amongst the minority Islamified ethnic groups, i.e., the Molbog, the Tausug (a non-native ethnic group), the Muslim Palaw'an, and the migratory Sama. By the 19th century, Cuyonon had replaced Tausug as a lingua franca. Many local Muslims and barter traders can also speak Sabah Malay.

English is spoken by a majority of the younger (age 20–39) population of Puerto Princesa. It is spoken by a minority in every other area of the province.

== Economy ==
Poverty incidence of Palawan (%)

Source: Philippine Statistics Authority

Palawan's economy is basically agricultural. The three major crops are palay, corn and coconut. Mineral resources include nickel, copper, manganese, and chromite. Logging is also a major industry. Palawan has one of the richest fishing grounds in the country. About 45% of Manila's supply of fish comes from here. Having natural gas reserves of approximately 30,000 trillion cubic feet, the province is the only oil-producing province in the country. In addition, tourism is also a thriving sector, having received 1.8 million tourists in 2018, a 21% year-over-year increase from 2017.

Once considered the world's largest pearl, the 240 millimeters (9.4 in) diameter Pearl of Lao Tzu, was found off Palawan in 1934.

The economic and agricultural business growth of province is at 20% per annum. Coconut, sugar, rice, lumber, and livestock are produced here.

== Biodiversity ==
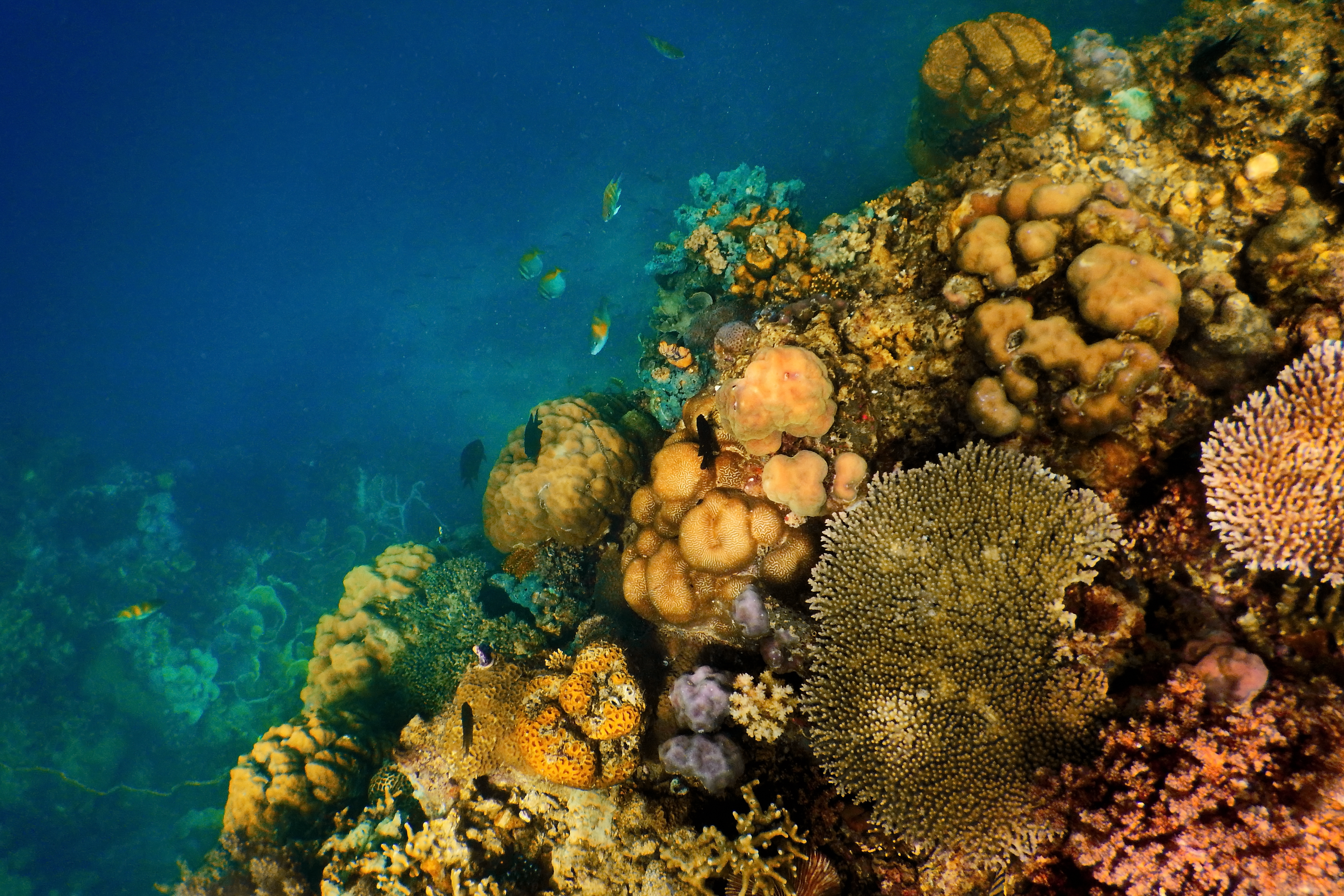
Coral Reefs in Coron, Palawan.

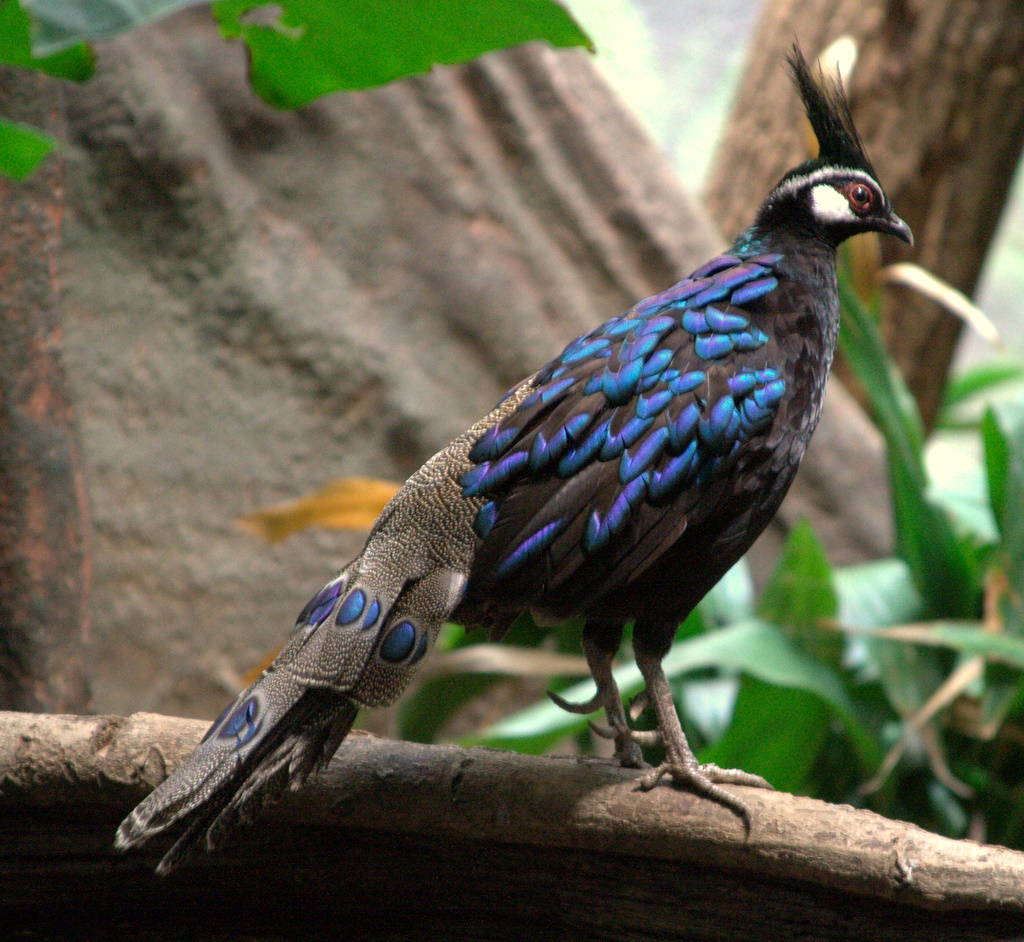
A Palawan peacock-pheasant

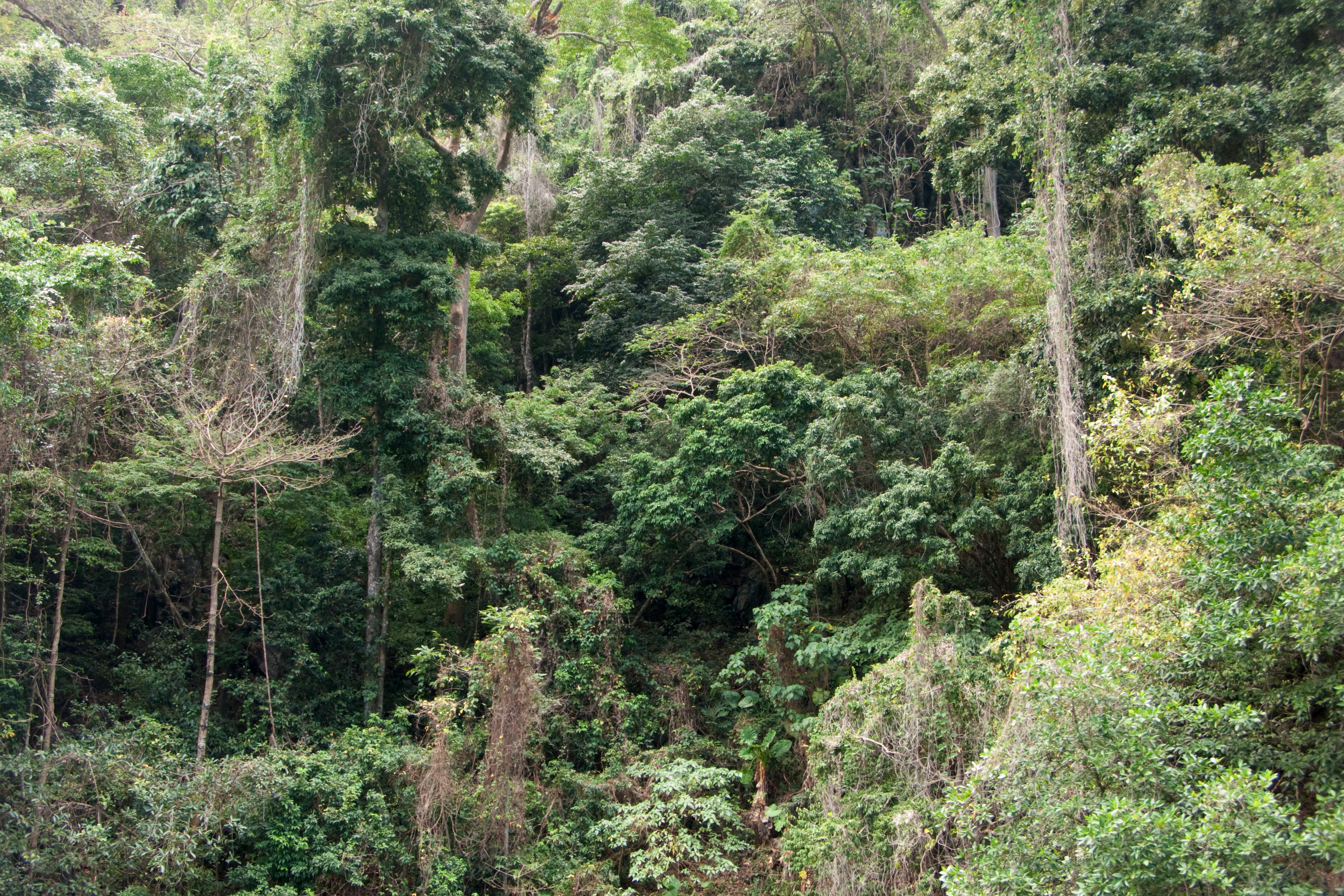
Limestone forest, El Nido

Unlike most of the Philippines, Palawan is biogeographically part of Sundaland, with a fauna and flora related to that found in Borneo.

Palawan had 700,000 hectares (1,700,000 acres) of forests as of 2010 and has been called the Philippines' "last biodiversity frontier."

Among the many endemic species are the Palawan peacock-pheasant, Philippine mouse-deer, Philippine pangolin, Palawan bearded pig, and Palawan birdwing. In the forests and grasslands, the air resonates with the songs of more than 200 kinds of birds. Over 600 species of butterflies flutter around the mountains and fields of Palawan, attracted to some 1500 hosts plants found here. Endangered sea turtles nest on white sand beaches. Sea turtles usually go to the nutrient-rich coastal waters of Palawan to rest and look for food. Dugong numbers have fallen seriously, although Palawan still has a larger population than any other part of the country, and organizations such as Community Centred Conservation (C3) are working to end the unsustainable use of marine resources in Palawan and in Philippines.

Total forest cover is about 56 percent of the total land area of the province while mangrove forest accounts for 3.35 percent based on the 1998 Landsat imagery. Grasslands dwindled from 19 percent in 1992 to 12.40 percent in 1998. This is an indication of improving soil condition as deteriorating soil is normally invaded by grass species. Brushlands increased to 25 percent of the total land area. Sprawled beneath the seas are nearly 11,000 square kilometers of coral reefs, representing more than 35% of the country's coral reefs.

Palawan, the only Philippine island cited, is rated by the Condé Nast Traveler Readers as the most beautiful island in the world and is also rated by the National Geographic Traveler magazine as the best island destination in East and Southeast Asia region in 2007, and the equal 27th best island in the world having "incredibly beautiful natural seascapes and landscapes. One of the most biodiverse (terrestrial and marine) islands in the Philippines. The island has had a Biosphere Reserve status since the early 1990s, showing local interest for conservation and sustainable development".

The province was also categorized as "doing well" in the 4th Destination Scorecard survey conducted by the National Geographic Center for Sustainable Destinations, and Conde Nast Traveler magazine voted its beaches, coves and islets as the tourist destination with the best beaches in Asia. Renowned underwater explorer Jacques Cousteau has described the province as having one of the most beautiful seascapes in the world.

== Attractions ==
=== Calauit Game Preserve and Wildlife Sanctuary ===
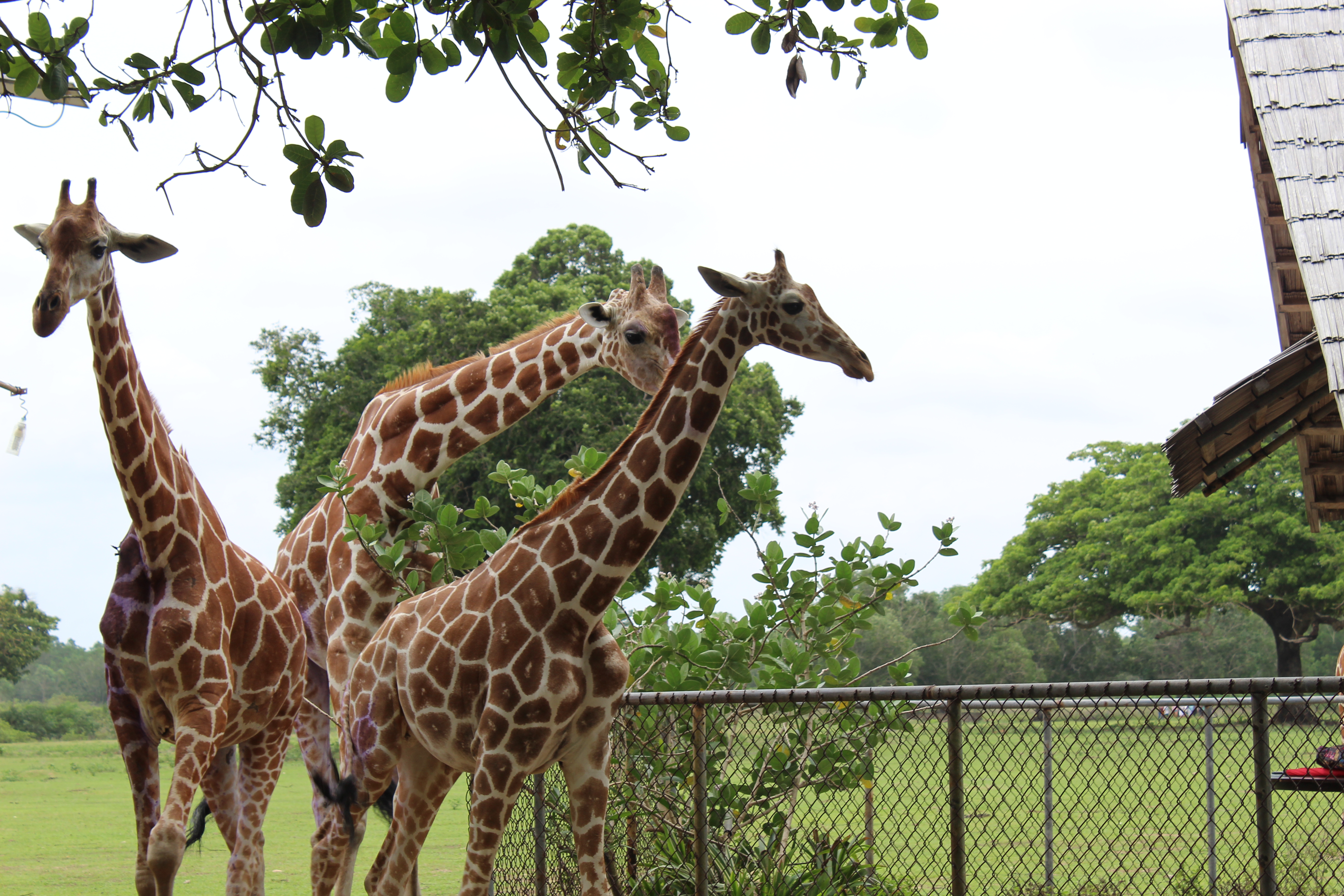
Reticulated giraffes inside the Calauit Safari Park

A game reserve and wildlife sanctuary of exotic African animals and endangered endemic animals of Palawan. It is on Calauit Island in Busuanga. The reserve was established on August 31, 1976, by virtue of the Presidential Proclamation No. 1578. The explanation the Ferdinand Marcos administration gave for establishing the park was that it was responding to the appeal of the International Union for Conservation of Nature (IUCN) to help save African wildlife. However, the IUCN, which has a policy against relocating animals outside of their natural range, bears no record of such a request.

Since 2009, management of the area has been the responsibility of the Office of the Palawan Council for Sustainable Development.

=== Coron Reefs, Coron Bay, Busuanga ===
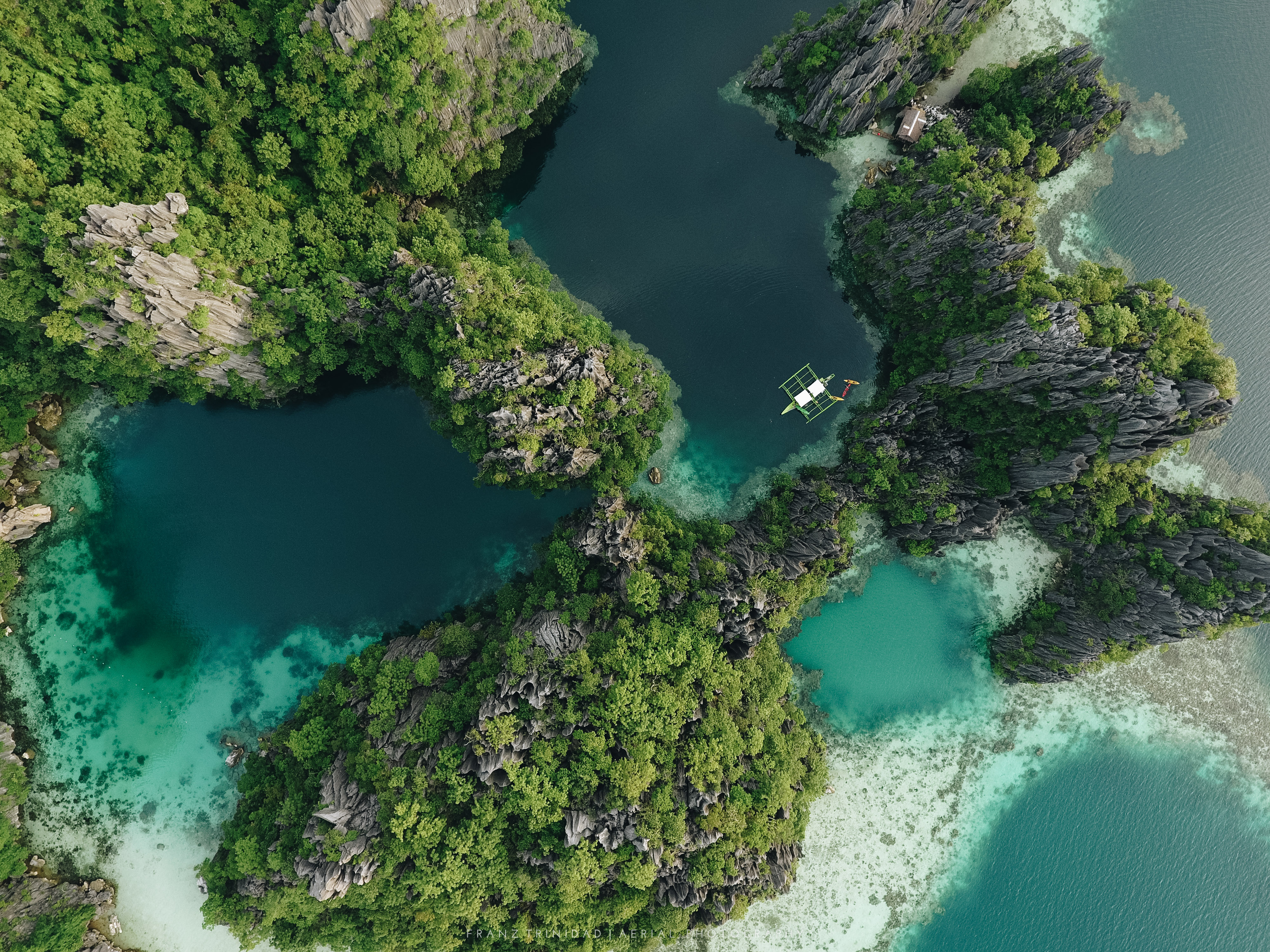
Limestone cliffs of Coron Island

Seven lakes surrounded by craggy limestone cliffs attract hundreds of nature lovers to Coron Reefs in Northern Palawan, near the town of Coron.

Busuanga Island, whose main town is Coron, is the jump-off point for numerous dive operators. The principal dive sites are World War II Japanese shipwrecks sunk on September 24, 1944, by United States Navy action. They range in depth from 12 metres (39 ft) to 43 metres (141 ft).

=== Kayangan Lake ===
Accessible by a steep 10-minute climb, Kayangan Lake is nestled into the mountain walls.The site includes a wooden walkway and a platform for swimmers to place their belongings. The lake generally experiences havy tourist traffic.

=== El Nido Marine Reserve Park ===
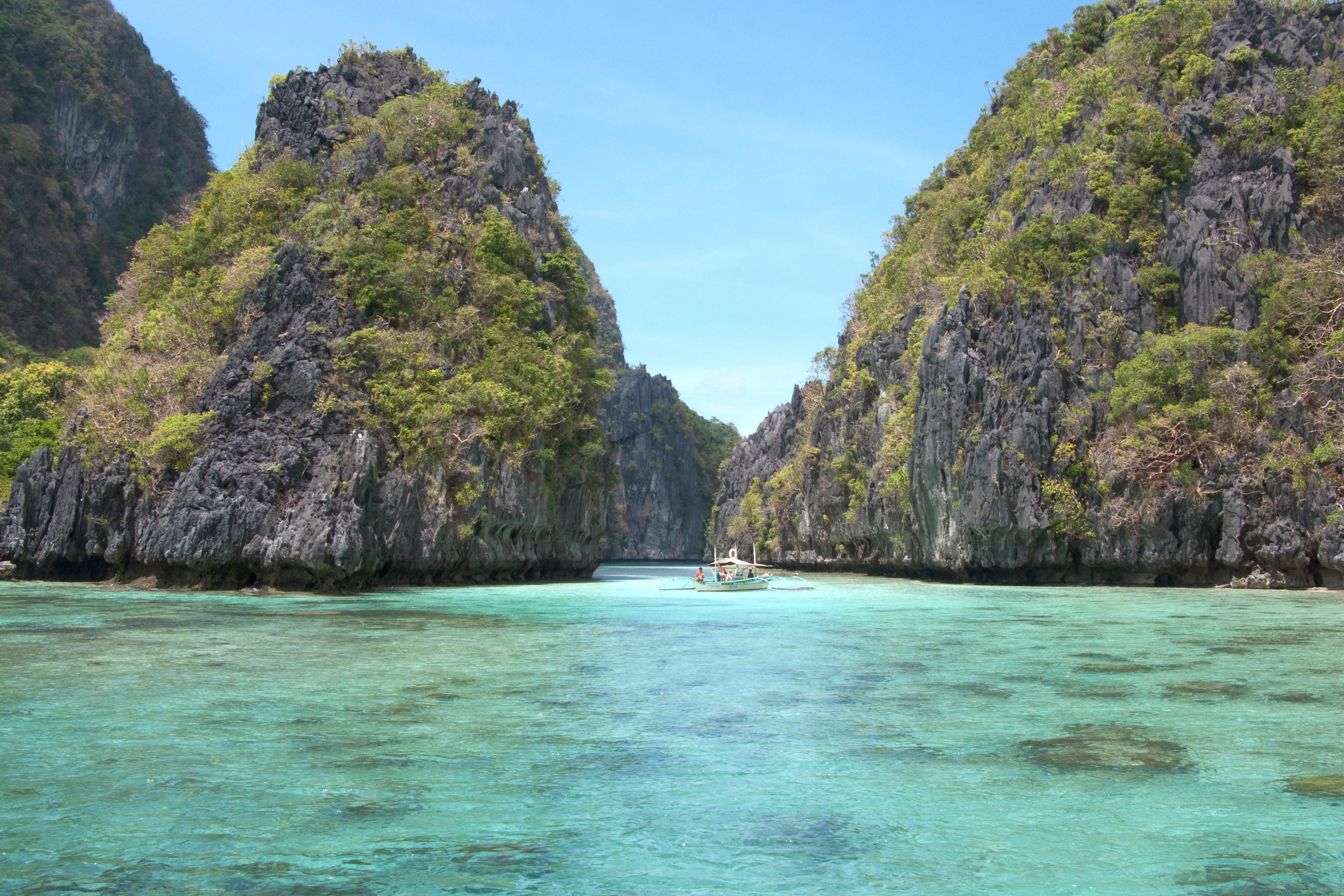
El Nido, Palawan

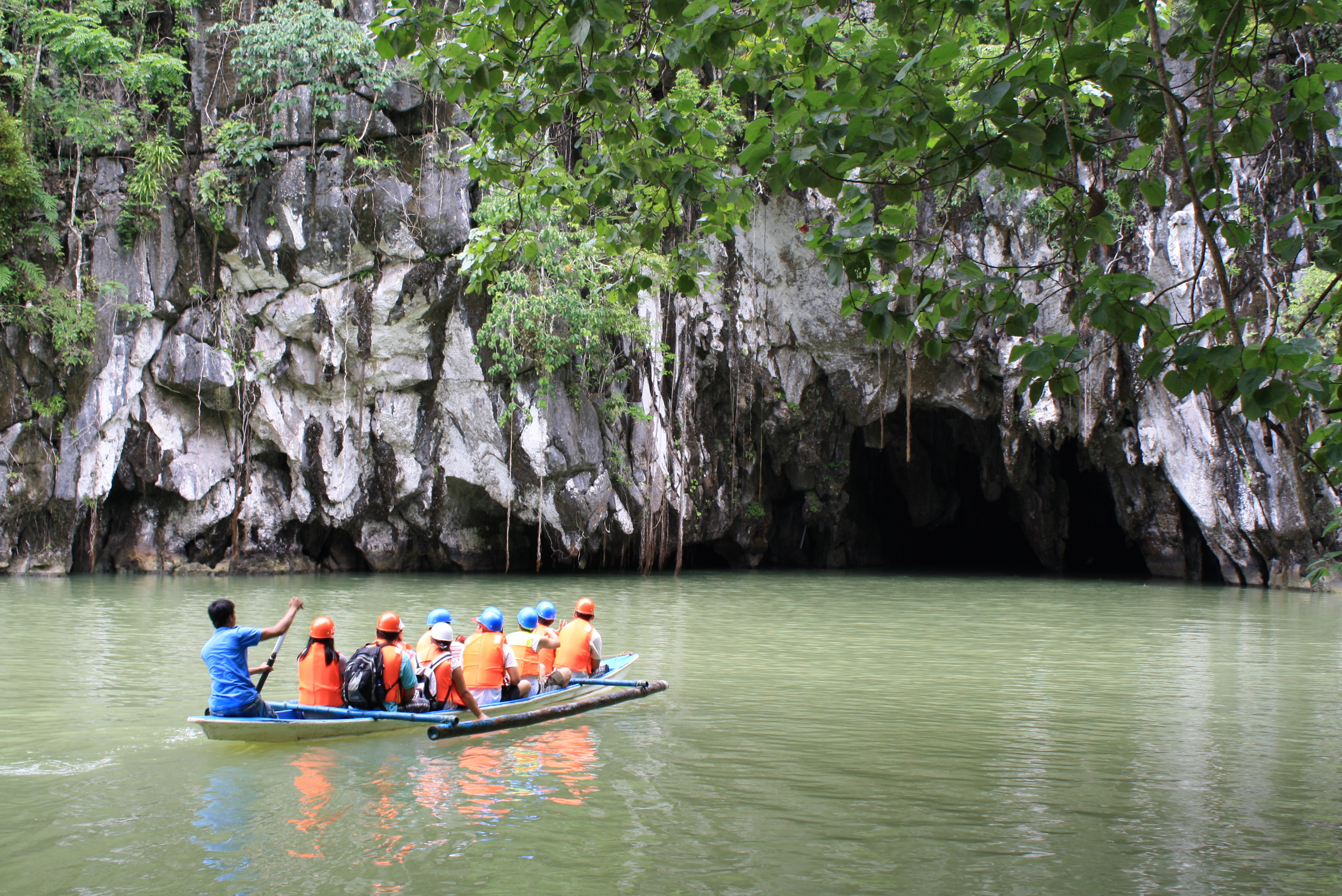
The Puerto Princesa Subterranean River National Park

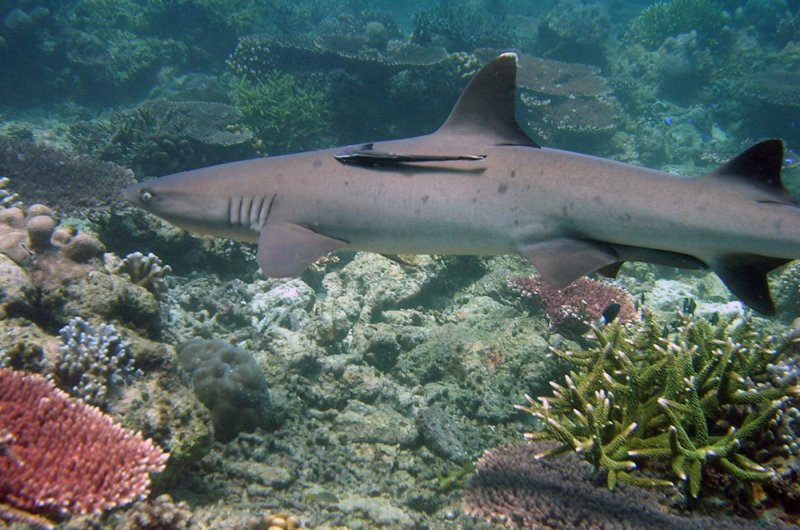
Whitetip reef shark at the Tubbataha Reef

The January 2008 issue of international magazine Travel + Leisure, published by the American Express Co. (which partnered with Conservation International), listed El Nido's sister hotel resorts El Nido Lagen Island and El Nido Miniloc Island in Miniloc and Lagen Islands as "conservation-minded places on a mission to protect the local environment". Travel + Leisure's 20 Favorite Green Hotels scored El Nido Resort's protection of Palawan's giant clam gardens and the re-introduction of endangered Philippine cockatoos. Guest cottages on stilts are set above the crystalline ocean. The resorts are active in both reef and island conservation."

=== Malampaya Sound Land and Seascape Protected Area ===
Located in the Municipality of Taytay, this important ecological and economic zone is a watershed and fishing ground, and the habitat of Bottle-nosed and Irrawaddy dolphins.

=== UNESCO World Heritage Sites ===
- Puerto-Princesa Subterranean River National Park (1999)

Puerto Princesa City is the home of the Puerto Princesa Subterranean River National Park or the Underground River, a UNESCO World Heritage Site. The 8-kilometer long tourist spot that showcases limestone karsts, diverse species and tropical rainforest is one of the world’s longest underground rivers and was also named as one of the “New 7 Wonders of Nature.”

- Tubbataha Reef Marine Park (1993)

The Tubbataha Reef Marine Park covers 332 km^{2}, including the North and South Reefs. It is a unique example of an atoll reef with a high density of marine species; the North Islet serving as a nesting site for birds and marine turtles. The site is an example of a coral reef with a 100 m perpendicular wall, extensive lagoons, and two coral islands.

=== Ursula Island ===
This game refuge and bird sanctuary is situated near the Municipality of Bataraza in southern Palawan. The islet is a migratory and wintering ground for shorebirds and seabirds.

=== Rasa Island Wildlife Sanctuary ===
This 1,983-hectare (4,900-acre) protected area located in the municipality of Narra is a nesting ground of the endemic Philippine cockatoo or katala. It also harbors other rare bird species and marine turtles.

== Security ==
The Armed Forces of the Philippines–Western Command in Canigaran and the Philippine National Police-Palawan Command with headquarters in Tiniguiban, Puerto Princesa, are responsible for maintenance of the peace and order. Military units in the province under the Western Command are the Naval Forces Northwest (Task Force 41 and 42), Philippine Air Force 4th Naval District IV, Delta Company and 10th Marine Battalion Landing Team located in Tiniguiban, Puerto Princesa. There has been discussion about dredging Ulugan Bay in order to build a larger naval base on Palawan, allowing the Philippines to project naval power into the South China Sea.

The U.S. Department of State issued a travel warning in May 2015, advising foreigners against travel to the southern part of Palawan. The warning continues to be in effect as of May 2017.

== Infrastructure ==
=== Communication ===
Four telecommunication companies provide local and international direct distance dialing and fax services. Inter island communications is available through the government's telegraph network and the Provincial Radio Communication System. In addition, there are 19 post offices, a number of cargo forwarders provide air parcel and freight services.

The province has access to two satellite-linked television stations. Cable television in the City of Puerto Princesa offers dozens of foreign channels while smaller firms provide cable services in selected towns. Individual cable facility (Dream Cable) is available locally. Thirteen radio stations are based in Puerto Princesa, four on the AM and nine on the FM bands. Community-based radio stations operate in some of the municipalities in the north and south of the province. Additional stations are expected to set up local affiliates in the capital city of Puerto Princesa.

Two mobile phone companies, Smart Communications and Globe Telecom, are operating in the province. Dito is expected to start operations in the province soon.

=== Health facilities ===
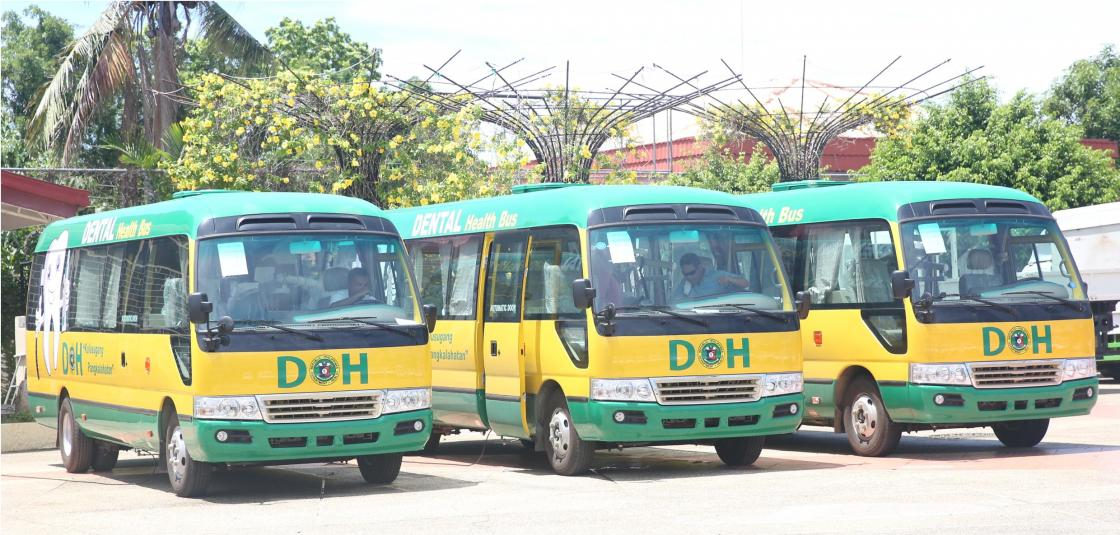
Dental Buses provided by the Department of Health for use of provincial government of Palawan.

There are nine provincial government hospitals, two national government hospitals, one military hospital and nine private hospitals in the province. The Culion Sanitarium and General Hospital, Ospital ng Palawan, managed and administered by the Department of Health (DOH), MMG-PPC Cooperative Hospital, and the Palawan Adventist Hospital are located in Puerto Princesa.

=== Utilities ===
The National Power Corporation has 14 electric facilities all over Palawan. It operates with a total of 51.363 megawatts of electricity. The effective power rates vary across different municipalities. According to Palawan Electric Cooperative (PALECO), the main island composed of 19 city and municipalities, has 59% of electrification with 135,284 households connected to the grid.

Water facilities in Palawan are classified as Level I (deepwell, handpump), Level II (communal faucet), or Level III (house connection). Among all of these types, Level I has the most units, accounting to 17,438; this is followed by Level III, with 1,688 units; and Level II, with only 94 units.

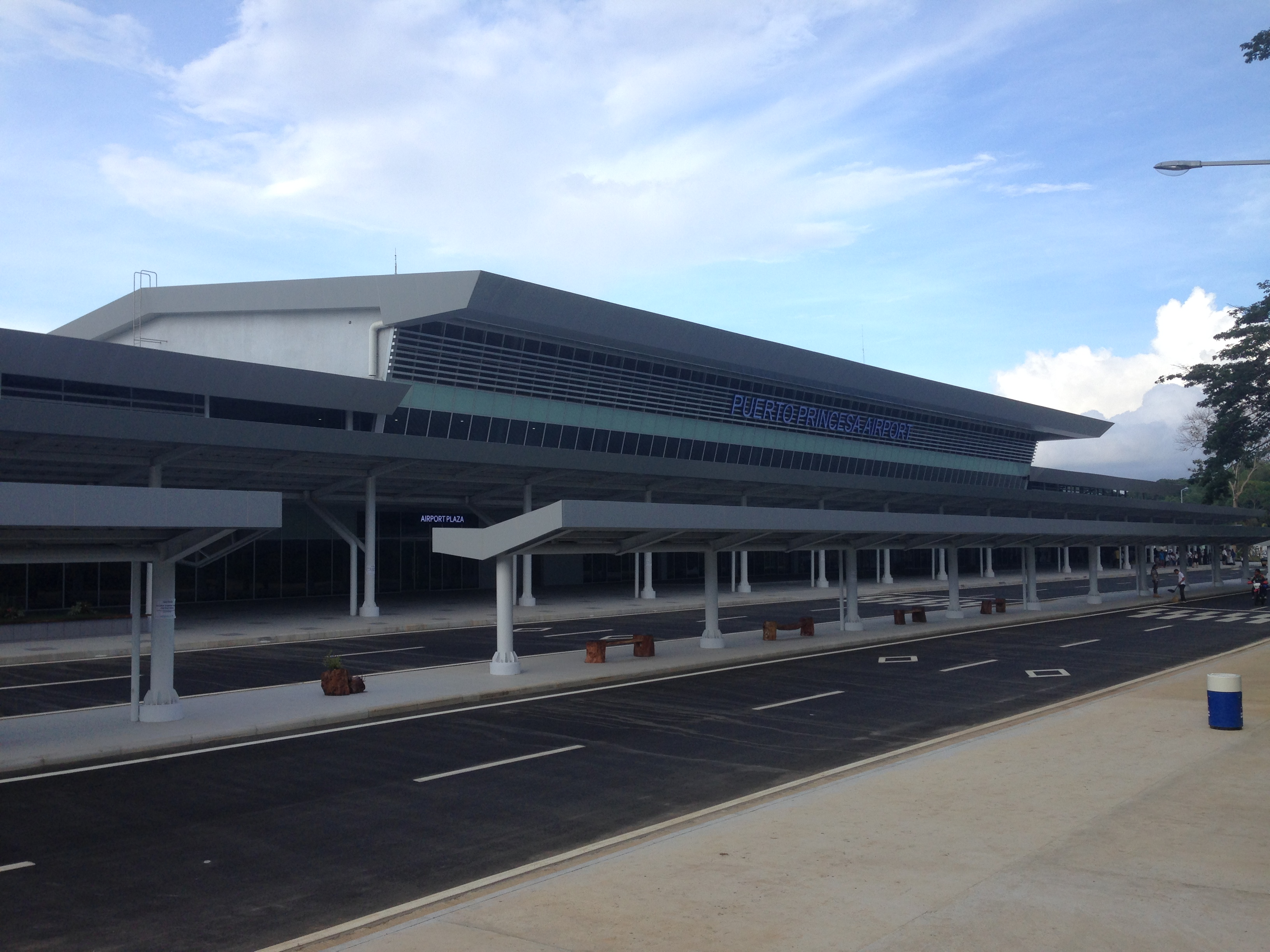
Puerto Princesa International Airport, the main gateway to the province of Palawan

=== Transportation ===
==== Air ====
The Puerto Princesa International Airport is the only international airport in Palawan, serving as the main gateway to the province. Other airports include:

===== Domestic =====
- Francisco B. Reyes Airport, Coron, Busuanga Island
- El Nido Airport, El Nido
- San Vicente Airport, San Vicente
- Cuyo Airport, Magsaysay
- Taytay Airport, Taytay
- Del Pilar Airport, Roxas
- Bugsuk (Bonbon) Airport, Balabac (Bugsuk Island)
- Tagbita Airport, Rizal
- Balabac Airport, Balabac
- Rio Tuba Airport, Bataraza

===== Other =====
- Coron Airstrip, Coron
- Culion Airstrip, Culion
- Brooke's Point Airstrip, Brooke's Point
- Candaraman Airstrip, Balabac (Candaraman Island)
- Inandeng Airstrip, San Vicente (under construction)
- Pamalican (Amanpulo) Airstrip, Cuyo (Pamalican Island)
- Old Busuanga Airstrip, Busuanga
- Rancudo Airfield, Kalayaan (military)
- Tarumpitao Point Airfield, Rizal

==== Seaports ====
Port of Puerto Princesa is the main port on Palawan, serving both cargo and passenger traffic to the island. Scheduled passenger ferry services are running weekly from Manila to this port. The port is managed by the Philippine Ports Authority. Other ports include:

- Port of Coron
- Port of El Nido
- Port of Mangingisda
- Port of Saipodin

== Government ==
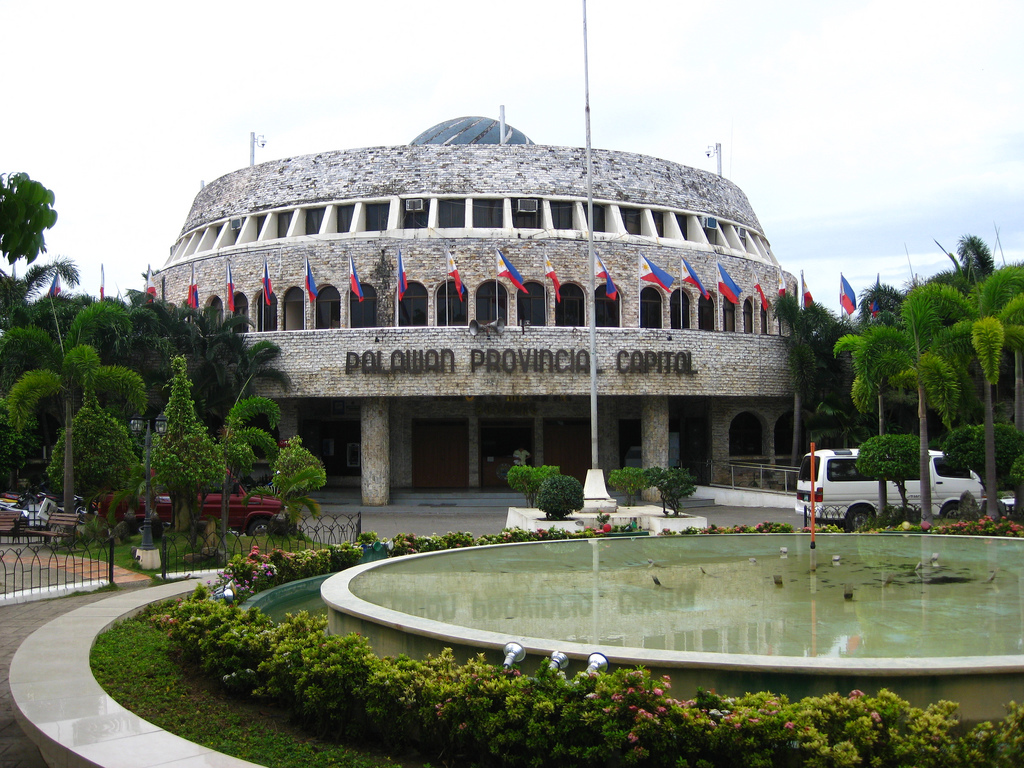
Palawan Provincial Capitol in Puerto Princesa.

Provincial Government of Palawan (2022–2025)

- Governor: Victorino Dennis M. Socrates
- Vice Governor: Leoncio N. Ola

Board Members of Palawan (2022–2025)

- 1st District:
  - Juan Antonio E. Alvarez
  - Winston G. Arzaga
  - Roseller S. Pineda
  - Maria Angela V. Sabando
  - Nieves C. Rosento
- 2nd District:
  - Ryan D. Maminta
  - Al-Nashier M. Ibba
  - Marivic H. Roxas
  - Ariston D. Arzaga
- 3rd District: Rafael V. Ortega Jr.
- PCL: Al-Shariff W. Ibba

Legislative District Representatives of Palawan (2022–2025)

- 1st District: Edgardo Salvame
- 2nd District: Jose C. Alvarez
- 3rd District: Edward S. Hagedorn

== Education ==
The literacy rate in Palawan is increasing by 2% annually because of expanding access to education. Among these programs are the establishment of schools in remote barangays, non-formal education, multi-grade mobile teaching and the drop-out intervention program.

Public schools in the province consist of 623 elementary schools, 126 secondary schools and two universities. Private schools are as follows: 26 elementary, 19 secondary, 4 private colleges, and 10 vocational schools.

Among the public institutions of higher education are the Palawan State University in Puerto Princesa City with 17 other campuses across the province, Western Philippines University with campuses in Aborlan and Puerto Princesa City, Coron College of Fisheries, Puerto Princesa School of Arts and Trade and the Palawan College of Arts and Trade in Cuyo, Palawan.

Some of the private institutions are the Holy Trinity University run by the Dominican Sisters of Saint Catherine of Siena, Palawan Polytechnical College Inc., in Roxas, San Vicente and Puerto Princesa City, Systems Technology Institute (STI), AMA Computer Learning Center (ACLC) in Puerto Princesa City, San Francisco Javier College run by the Augustinian Recollect Sisters in Narra, Loyola College in Culion run by the Jesuits, St. Joseph Academy in Cuyo, St. Augustine Academy in Coron, Coron Technical School, Sacred Heart of Jesus High School in Brooke's Point; Northern Palawan Christian Institute (owned and manage by the Iglesia Filipina Independiente, Palawan Diocese) and the unique educational institution called the St. Ezekiel Moreno Dormitory located in barangay Macarascas, Puerto Princesa City, founded by Bishop Broderick Pabillo, the present auxiliary bishop of the Archdiocese of Manila. The Palawanologist, Andrei Ustares Acosta of El Nido, Palawan, founded the new discipline on the studies of Palawan called the Palawanology.

== Awards and recognition ==
Palawan earned the third spot in the annual Condé Nast Traveler (CNT) readers' choice awards for top islands to visit in 2021.

== See also ==
- Dewil Valley
- Legislative districts of Palawan
- List of islands of the Philippines
- Puerto Princesa Subterranean River National Park
