= Western Philippines University =

Public university in Palawan, Philippines

- Motto in English: A Strong Partner for Sustainable Development
- Type: State-funded Higher Education Institution
- Established: 1910
- Chairperson: Dr. Shirley C. Agrupis
- President: Dr. Amabel S. Liao
- Vice-president: Dr. Lota A. Creencia (Academic Affairs); Dr. Ria S. Sariego (Administration & Finance); Dr. Jhonamie M. Omar (Research, Innovation, Development & Extension; Dr. Lita B. Sopsop (Student Affairs & Services)
- Location: San Juan, Aborlan, Palawan, Philippines; 9°26′25″N 118°33′30″E
- Website: wpu.edu.ph
- Location in the Philippines

Western Philippines University (Filipino: Pamantasang Pampamahalaan ng Kanluraning Pilipinas) is a state higher education institution located in Palawan. The university began as the Aborlan Farm Settlement School for the Tagbanuas (an indigenous cultural community of Palawan) in 1910. It became the Aborlan Agricultural High School in 1928 and then Palawan Regional Agricultural School in 1960. It was renamed Palawan National School in 1962 and became the Palawan National Agricultural College in 1963. Its name was again changed to State Polytechnic College of Palawan in 1995 by virtue of RA 8012, and in 2004, President Gloria Macapagal Arroyo signed RA 9260 converting it to Western Philippines University.

== Curricular Offerings ==
=== Graduate school ===
- PhD in Rural Development
- PhD in Fisheries
- MS in Marine Biology
- MS in Fisheries
- MS in Rural Development
- MS in Extension Systems Management
- MS in Agronomy
- MS in Horticulture
- MS in Agricultural Education
- Master in Public Administration
- Master in Educational Management
- Certificate in Extension Systems Management
- Certificate in Teaching Program

=== Baccalaureate Courses ===
- BS in Agricultural Engineering
- BS in Civil Engineering
- BS in Electrical Engineering
- BS in Mechanical Engineering
- BS in Aquatic Biology
- BS in Agriculture
- BS in Agricultural Business
- BS in Business Administration (Major in Financial Management, Marketing Management)
- BS in Criminology
- BS in Entrepreneurship
- BS in Environmental Management
- BS in Fisheries
- BS in Forestry
- BS in Home Economics
- BS in Hospitality Management
- BS in Public Administration
- BS in Rural Development Management
- BS in Social Work
- Bachelor of Agricultural Technology
- Bachelor of Arts in Sociology
- Bachelor of Elementary Education
- Bachelor of Secondary Education
- Bachelor of Physical Education

=== Pre-Baccalaureate Courses ===
- Certificate in Agricultural Science leading to BS in Agriculture

=== Basic Education Laboratory Schools ===
- Agricultural Science High School (Senior High School & Junior High School)
- Laboratory Elementary School (Grades I to VI)

== Branches and Campuses ==
- Main Campus in San Juan, Aborlan, Palawan
- Puerto Princesa City Campus in Sta. Monica, Puerto Princesa City
- Culion Campus in Jardin, Culion, Palawan
- Busuanga Campus in Salvacion, Busuanga, Palawan
- El Nido Campus in Villa Libertad, El Nido, Palawan
- Canique Extension School in Taytay, Palawan
- Quezon Campus in Poblacion, Quezon, Palawan
- Rio Tuba Extension School in Rio Tuba, Bataraza, Palawan
