= Palawan State University =

Public university in Puerto Princesa, Philippines

- Pamantasang Pampamahalaan ng Palawan (Filipino)
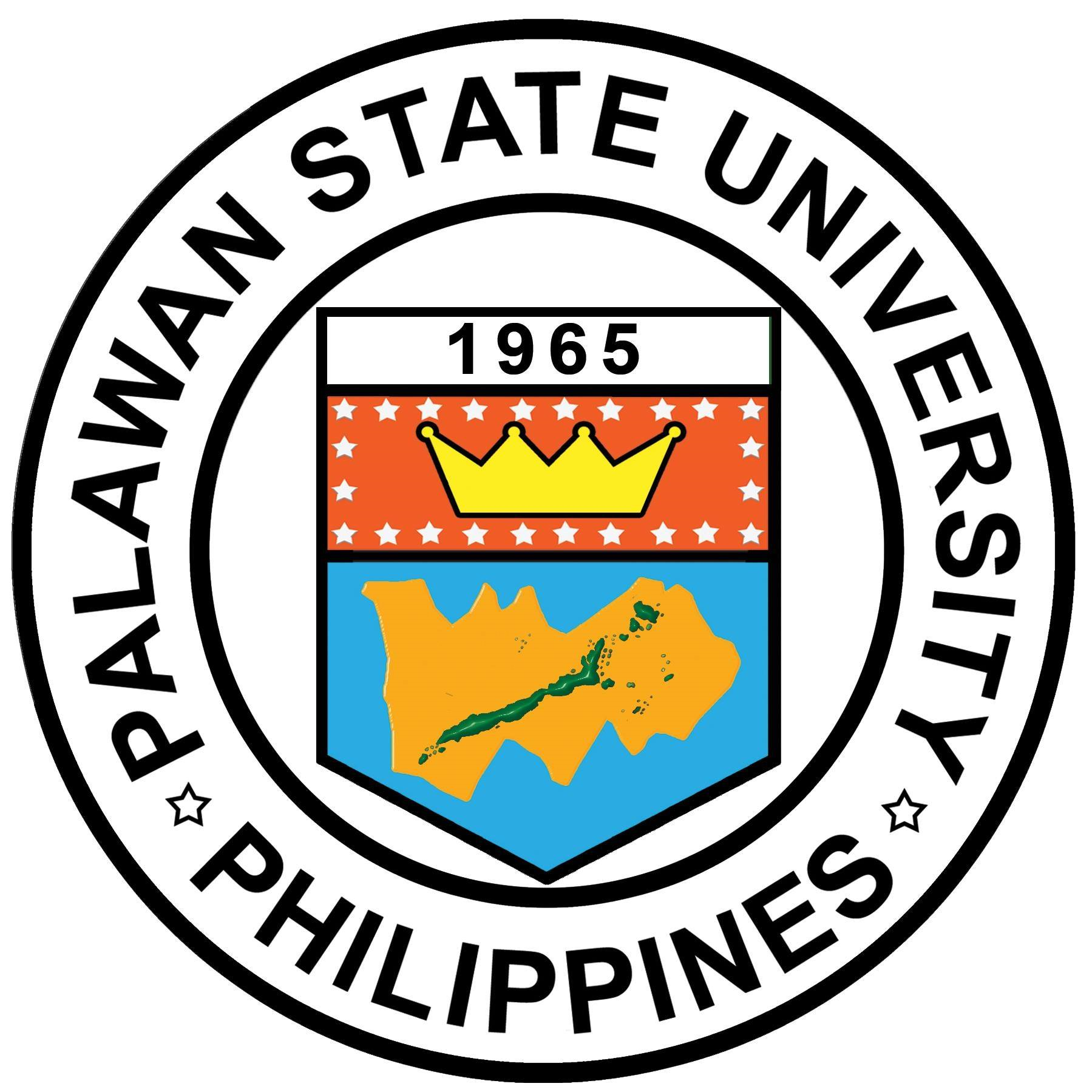
- Other names: PalSU, Palawan SU
- Former names: Palawan Teacher’s College (1965–1984); Palawan State College (1984–1994)
- Type: Public, state university
- Established: March 2, 1965; 61 years ago
- President: Dr. Ramon Docto
- Faculty: 450
- Location: Puerto Princesa, Palawan, Philippines; 9°46′40″N 118°44′00″E
- Campus: Main, Tiniguiban Heights, Puerto Princesa City 68 hectares (680,000 m^{2})
- Newspaper: Pioneer Publication
- Hymn: PSU Beloved
- Website: psu.palawan.edu.ph
- Location in the Philippines

Palawan State University (Palawan SU; PalSU) is a public government-funded higher education institution in Puerto Princesa, Palawan, Philippines.

== History ==
The Palawan State University, the first state university in Palawan and in Region IV, traces its humble beginnings to the teacher training institution known as Palawan Teacher's College (PTC), which was established through Republic Act 4303 on March 2, 1965, and has started operating since March 2, 1972. Then Congressman Gaudencio Abordo sponsored the bill establishing the college at the then municipality of Puerto Princesa.

The creation of PTC was in response to the need of additional teachers in the province since most of the available educators at that time came from Luzon; and only a handful were willing to be assigned in far-flung areas of the province.

Funded by an initial half-a-million pesos, the university opened night classes to 101 students under the tutelage of 10 faculty members, and 16 support staff, using four borrowed classrooms from state-funded Palawan National High School.

Its first president was Dr. Walfrido Ponce de Leon, who was succeeded by five presidents since.

The early days of the institution as a teacher's College saw its thrust focused solely on education degree. Years later however, the school added new curriculum to address the province's other educational needs.

In 1984, then Minister of Natural Resources Teodoro Peña sponsored the transition of Palawan Teacher's College to Palawan State College by virtue of Batas Pambansa Blg. 797, allowing for the university to offer courses in the Art, Sciences and Technology.

Dr. Heracleo Lagrada succeeded Dr. Ponce de Leon as president in 1985 and a year later was in turn succeeded by Prof. Paterno Bruselas.

In 1991, Dr. Teresita Salva became its fourth president, with the institution championing the cause of being the “Place for Social Change.” After her term, Dr. Salva would return for another tenure in 1999 until her retirement in 2011.

Under Salva's administration, PSE established its law school, supervised by it first dean, Atty. Teodoro Peña.

It was also under the stewardship of Dr. Salva that effort to have Palawan State College be conferred the university status.

It was however only on November 12, 1994, under the stewardship of PSU's fifth president Dr. Crispiniano Acosta, that Palawan State College was elevated into a university by virtue of R.A. 7818, sponsored by congressman Alfredo Abueg Jr. and David Ponce de Leon.

PSU in 1995, then offered 11 new academic programs – Bachelor of Science in Tourism, Marine Biology, Environmental Science, Computer Science, Agri-Business and Hotel and Restaurant Management, four diploma courses, and the first Petroleum Engineering course in the Philippines.

In 1999, Salva returned as university president.

Recently, PSU is under the stewardship of its president Dr. Marissa S. Pontillas succeeding Dr. Jeter Sespeñe, and now in care of Dr. Ramon M. Docto as elected president on his second term, made PSU to its official name as PalawanSU.

== Campuses ==
Palawan State University (PalawanSU) has two major campuses: the Manalo Campus, where the Laboratory Elementary School, Graduate School and School of Law are, and the Main Campus in Tiniguiban Heights, the biggest campus of the 19 different locations. It houses the administration building, the colleges, the Laboratory High School, and the physical plant offices. In addition, a number of extramural studies and programs are being offered in the Palawan State University's College of Community Resources and Development (CCRD) in rural campuses of Rizal, Narra, Quezon, Araceli, Brooke's Point, San Vicente, Cuyo, Coron, Balabac, Roxas, Taytay, El Nido, Linapacan, San Rafael, Sofronio Española, Dumaran and Bataraza.

== Expanded Tertiary Education Equivalency and Accreditation Program ==
In response to the call of time, Palawan State University opened another avenue of learning for non-degree holders but currently working in the different offices and industries who may want to finish their degrees without moving out of their work area.

During the 365th meeting of the Board of the Commission on Higher Education held last December 13, 2010, in Manila through CEB Resolution No. 328-2010, the commission approved the university's application for the deputation to offer Bachelor of Science in Business Administration and Bachelor of Science in Petroleum Engineering effective January 2011 until January 2016 via Expanded Tertiary Education Equivalency and Accreditation Program (ETEEAP).

Expanded Tertiary Education Equivalency and Accreditation Program (ETEEAP) is a comprehensive educational assessment program which recognizes knowledge, skills, attitudes and values obtained by individuals from formal, non-formal and informal education and training and related work experiences.

MEDICAL EDUCATION: On 19 August 2013 Palawan State University signed a Memorandum of Agreement with the Government of the province of Palawan for the establishment of a Graduate School of Medical Sciences and for training of Medical Doctors, construction of a District Hospital in the premises of PSU and Scholarships / free education for residents of Palawan Province. Palawan State University has been training nurses and is affiliated to three hospitals in Puerto Princesa for training of nurses and doctors. The Provincial Government of Palawan will fund the establishment of a new District Hospital in the campus of Palawan State University. The School of Medical Sciences will offer the MD degree, which is equivalent to MBBS in the Commonwealth (UK) system. http://psu.palawan.edu.ph/?q=node/335

== Professional studies ==
- Bachelor of Laws

== Graduate Studies ==
- Master of Science in Technopreneurship (newly launched in August 2021. PSU is the only SUC in the Philippines offering this Master's program)
- Master of Arts in education (School Leadership and Instruction, Mathematics, Social Science, Guidance and Counseling, Physical Education)
- Master of Arts in Teaching (General Science, Chemistry, Physics, Biology, Language Studies (English and Filipino Streams)
- Master of Education (non-thesis)
- Master of Business Administration
- Doctor of Business Administration
- Doctor of Education (Educational Administration)
