= Cagayan Island =

Cagayan Island can refer to:

- Mapun, an island in the southern Sulu Sea in Tawi-Tawi Province. Formerly known as "Cagayan de Sulu" and "Cagayan de Tawi-Tawi".
- Cagayancillo, an island located in the northern Sulu Sea in Palawan Province and part of the Cagayan Islands. Formerly known simply as "Cagayan"

== See also ==
- Cagayan (disambiguation)
