= Magsaysay, Palawan =

Municipality in Palawan, Philippines

Magsaysay Lucbuan
- Municipality
- Municipality of Magsaysay
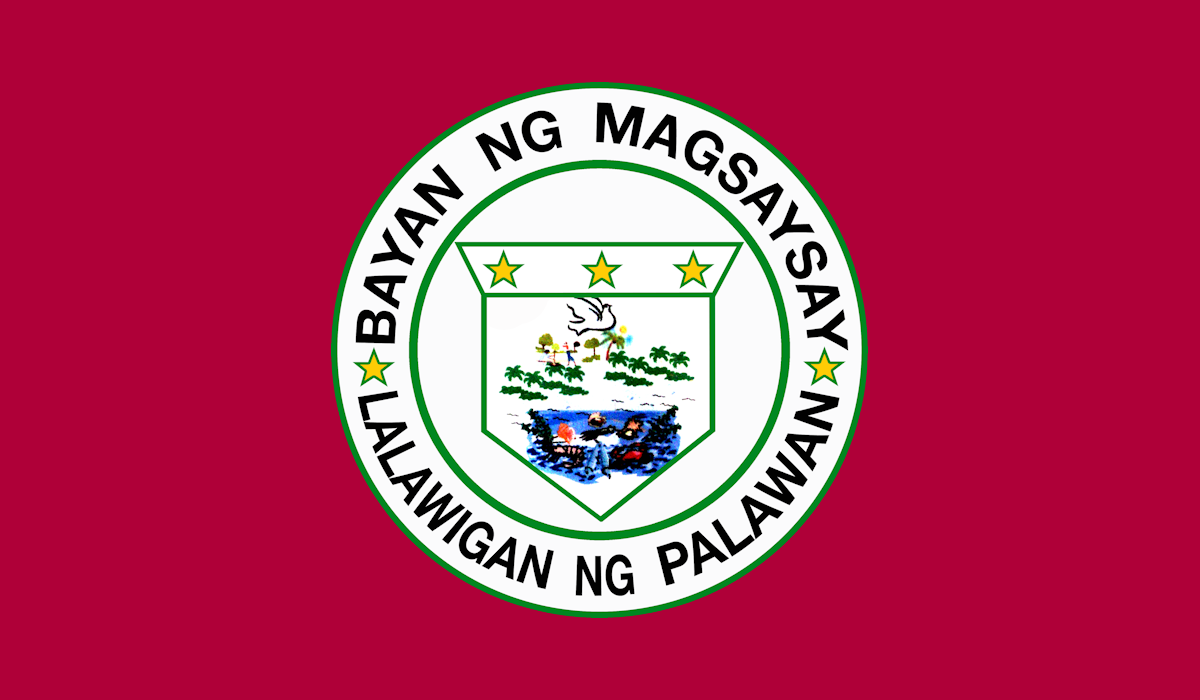
- Flag Seal

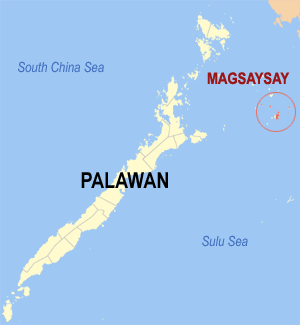
- Map of Palawan with Magsaysay highlighted
- Interactive map of Magsaysay
- Location within the Philippines
- Coordinates: 10°52′N 121°03′E
- Country: Philippines
- Region: Mimaropa
- Province: Palawan
- District: 1st district
- Founded: January 1, 1964
- Barangays: 11 (see Barangays)

Government
  - Type: Sangguniang Bayan
  - Mayor: Rommel L. dela Torre
  - Vice Mayor: Manuel C. Abrea
  - Representative: Rosalie Salvame
  - Municipal Council: Members: Mary Catherine Jardin; Neil Ponce de Leon; Teresita Evio; Melvin Abrea; Renerio Andao; Cynthia Quejano; Anacleto Garcellano; Renante Rodriguez
  - Electorate: 7,952 voters (2025)

Area
  - Total: 49.48 km^{2} (19.10 sq mi)
- Elevation: 20 m (66 ft)
- Highest elevation: 255 m (837 ft)
- Lowest elevation: −2 m (−6.6 ft)

Population (2024 census)
  - Total: 13,273
  - Density: 268.2/km^{2} (694.8/sq mi)
  - Households: 2,973
- Demonym: Dasolinians

Economy
  - Income class: 4th municipal income class
  - Poverty incidence: 18.06% (2023)
  - Revenue: ₱ 78.09 million (2020), 31.67 million (2012), 34.84 million (2013), 40.7 million (2014), 45.05 million (2015), 50.03 million (2016), 57.52 million (2017), 60.84 million (2018), 63.97 million (2019), 77.19 million (2021), 30.54 million (2010), 32.09 million (2011)
  - Assets: ₱ 187.8 million (2020), 35.15 million (2012), 43.53 million (2013), 52.9 million (2014), 76.52 million (2015), 93.56 million (2016), 127.1 million (2017), 167.8 million (2018), 178.6 million (2019), 213.8 million (2021), 24.71 million (2010), 29.95 million (2011)
  - Expenditure: ₱ 81.36 million (2020), 25.92 million (2012), 29.6 million (2013), 30.79 million (2014), 34.13 million (2015), 37.08 million (2016), 39.07 million (2017), 42.29 million (2018), 52.41 million (2019), 61.96 million (2021), 30.19 million (2010), 29.18 million (2011)
  - Liabilities: ₱ 60.63 million (2020), 7.702 million (2012), 13.04 million (2013), 12.2 million (2014), 27.46 million (2015), 31.77 million (2016), 48.41 million (2017), 77.24 million (2018), 38.65 million (2019), 73.4 million (2021), 4.457 million (2010), 7.664 million (2011)

Service provider
  - Electricity: Palawan Electric Cooperative (PALECO)
- Time zone: UTC+8 (PST)
- ZIP code: 5319
- PSGC: 1705314000
- IDD : area code: +63 (0)48

Magsaysay, officially the Municipality of Magsaysay (Cuyonon: Banwa 'ang Magsaysay; Tagalog: Bayan ng Magsaysay), is a municipality in the province of Palawan, Philippines. According to the 2024 census, it has a population of 13,273 people.

== Etymology ==
Before its current name, Magsaysay was called Lucbuan as a barrio of Cuyo. Lucbuan was derived from the Cuyunon word lucbo, which means 'to jump'. It was believed that after a Moro pirate tried to kidnap a resident, he jumped off the boat to escape. However, in 1961 after its separation from Cuyo, Magsaysay was named after President Ramon Magsaysay as a form of tribute in his honor.

== History ==
=== Spanish era ===
The modern-day municipality traces back its origins to the town of Cuyo. Cuyo, which included the entire island of Cuyo, was founded as a Spanish settlement in 1622. In 1666, a fort was built in Lucbuan.

In 1762, one of the British ships that invaded Manila fired at the Cuyo fort, but it was not damaged at all. Another fort was started at Lucbuan seven kilometres away on the east side of Cuyo island, but it was never finished.

=== Lucbuan Republic ===
The Revolutionary Dictatorial Government of Lucbuan, often referred to as the “Lucbuan Republic” was a state on the island of Cuyo (now Magsaysay, Palawan) that briefly existed during the Philippine-American War. It was established to break away from the administration of President Emilio Aguinaldo and his central administration.

Even before the establishment of the Republic of Lucbuan, Don Casiano Padon, a native of Molo, Iloilo, began organizing a government in August 1898 due to the persuasion of the people of Lucbuan.

After the arrival of the representative of the Province of Calamianes from Bulacan in the last days of 1898, there was not much change in leadership in the entire archipelago of Cuyo and Palawan. This affected the livelihood of the people of Lucbuan as well as the inability to rule by the rulers of Calamianes. By this time the Spaniards had fled throughout Palawan to Borneo to return to Spain.

Very few knew Aguinaldo, and that is why the people of Lucbuan did not like to be ruled by Tagalog representatives under Aguinaldo which was the reason the Republic of Lucbuan was founded by Don Casiano Padon on 30 May 1899 and he himself as Governor of the government.

All went well for the government until Padon decided to build a church which was strongly opposed by the legislature and the people. Thus, Padon and his family fled back to Iloilo and thus for the second time the attempt to join the state and the church was frustrated.

=== American era ===
This republic was not long in coming when the Province of Calamianes was organized by the Americans on 23 June 1902 under Philippine Commission Act No. 422. This was also accompanied by the conquest of the island of Lucbuan by American soldiers. This is also when the Lucbuan Republic ended.

A marker of Don Casiano Padon currently exists on the municipality of Magsaysay in commemoration of the foundation of the Lucbuan Republic.

=== World War II ===
Like the rest of Cuyo, Lucbuan was conquered by the Imperial Japanese Army on 19 May 1942 and guerrilla resistance stayed in the interior. Eventually, they were liberated by the US Air Corps on 6 January 1945.

=== Modern era ===
On June 18, 1961, the barrios of Balaguen, Canipo, Cocoro, Danawan, Igabas, Imilod, Los Angeles, Lucbuan, Patonga, Rizal, Siparay Island, and Tagawayan Island were separated from the municipality of Cuyo and constituted into a new municipality known as Magsaysay, by virtue of Republic Act No. 3426. The law took effect on January 1, 1964, when its first municipal officials were elected in the November 1963 local elections.

== Geography ==
Magsaysay is the easternmost of the three municipalities of the Cuyo Archipelago, and its territory includes the eastern half of Cuyo Island, as well as Alcoba, Canipo, Cocoro, Patunga, Paya, Putic, Siparay, Tacbubuc, and Tagauanian islands.

=== Barangays ===
Magsaysay is politically subdivided into 11 barangays. Each barangay consists of puroks and some have sitios.

- Alcoba
- Balaguen
- Canipo
- Cocoro
- Danawan (Poblacion)
- Emilod
- Igabas
- Lacaren
- Los Angeles
- Lucbuan – one of the oldest barangays in Magsaysay. The Saint Michael Archangel Parish Church, where the town fiesta is celebrated, and Cuyo Airport are both located in Lucbuan.
- Rizal

=== Climate ===
Climate data for Magsaysay, Palawan
Month	Jan	Feb	Mar	Apr	May	Jun	Jul	Aug	Sep	Oct	Nov	Dec	Year
Mean daily maximum °C (°F)	29 (84)	30 (86)	30 (86)	31 (88)	31 (88)	30 (86)	29 (84)	30 (86)	29 (84)	29 (84)	29 (84)	29 (84)	30 (85)
Mean daily minimum °C (°F)	23 (73)	23 (73)	23 (73)	24 (75)	25 (77)	25 (77)	25 (77)	24 (75)	24 (75)	24 (75)	24 (75)	24 (75)	24 (75)
Average precipitation mm (inches)	45 (1.8)	34 (1.3)	62 (2.4)	64 (2.5)	127 (5.0)	159 (6.3)	172 (6.8)	147 (5.8)	167 (6.6)	182 (7.2)	172 (6.8)	88 (3.5)	1,419 (56)
Average rainy days	12.1	9.4	13.0	14.3	22.7	26.9	28.0	26.4	27.0	27.0	22.7	17.8	247.3
Source: Meteoblue

== Demographics ==
Population census of Magsaysay

Year	Pop.	±% p.a.
1970	9,840	—
1975	9,418	−0.88%
1980	9,618	+0.42%
1990	10,028	+0.42%
1995	10,714	+1.25%
2000	10,885	+0.34%

Year	Pop.	±% p.a.
2007	11,339	+0.57%
2010	11,965	+1.97%
2015	12,196	+0.36%
2020	12,603	+0.69%
2024	13,273	+1.25%

Source: Philippine Statistics Authority

In the 2024 census, the population of Magsaysay, Palawan, was 13,273 people, with a density of 270 inhabitants per square kilometre or 700 inhabitants per square mile.

== Economy ==
Poverty incidence of Magsaysay (%)

Source: Philippine Statistics Authority

== Education ==
The Magsaysay Schools District Office governs all educational institutions within the municipality. It oversees the management and operations of all private and public, from primary to secondary schools.

=== Primary and elementary schools ===
- Balaguen Elementary School
- Canipo Elementary School
- Cocoro Elementary School
- Emilod Elementary School
- Igabas Elementary School
- Island View Adventist Elementary School
- Lacaren Elementary School
- Los Angeles Elementary School
- Lucbuan Elementary School
- Magsaysay Central Elementary School
- Rizal Elementary School
- Rizal North Elementary School

=== Secondary schools ===
- Balaguen National High School
- Danawan National High School
- Gaudencio E. Abordo Memorial National High School
