= Dumaran =

Municipality in Palawan, Philippines

- Municipality
- Municipality of Dumaran
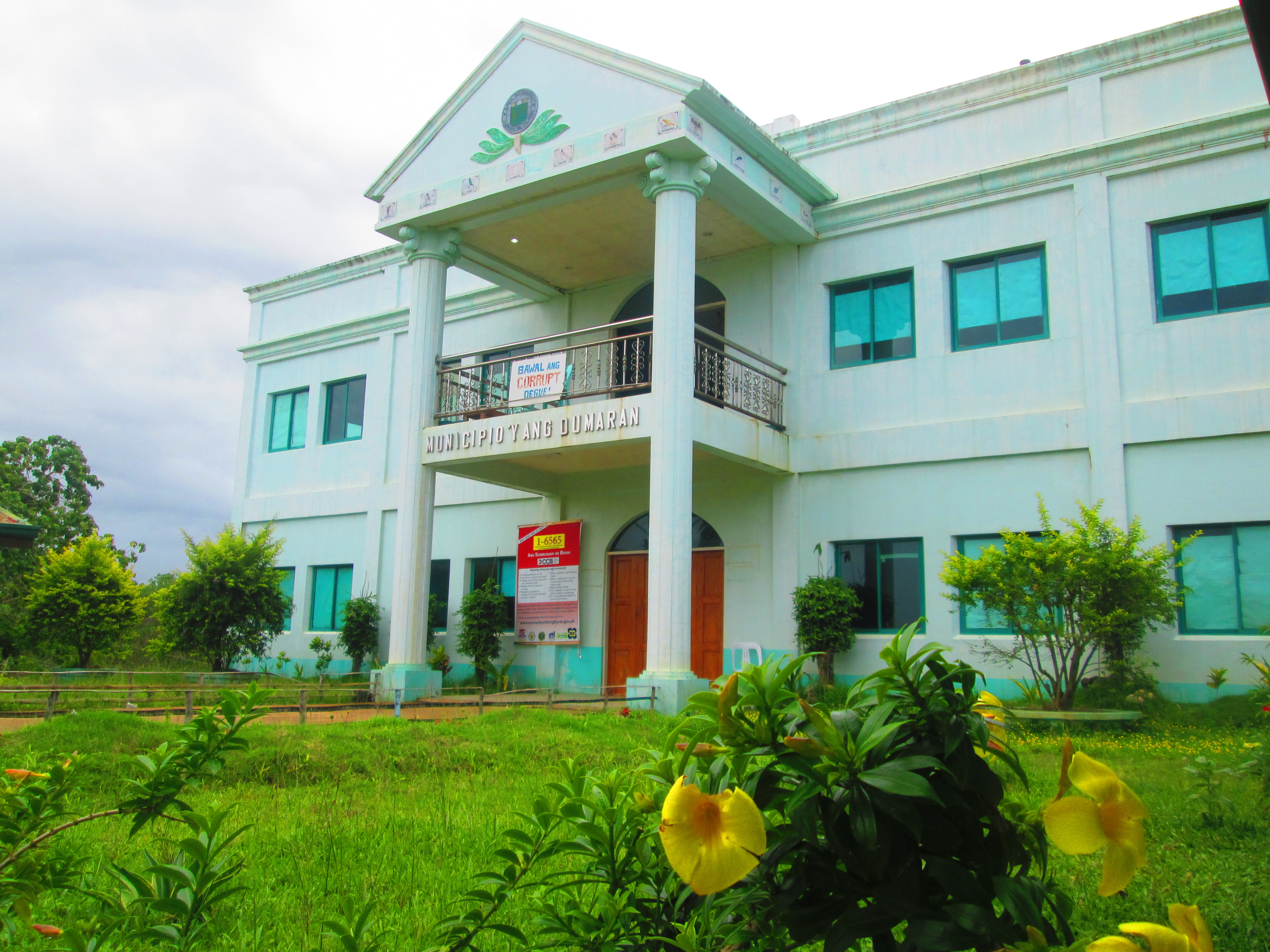
- Municipal Hall

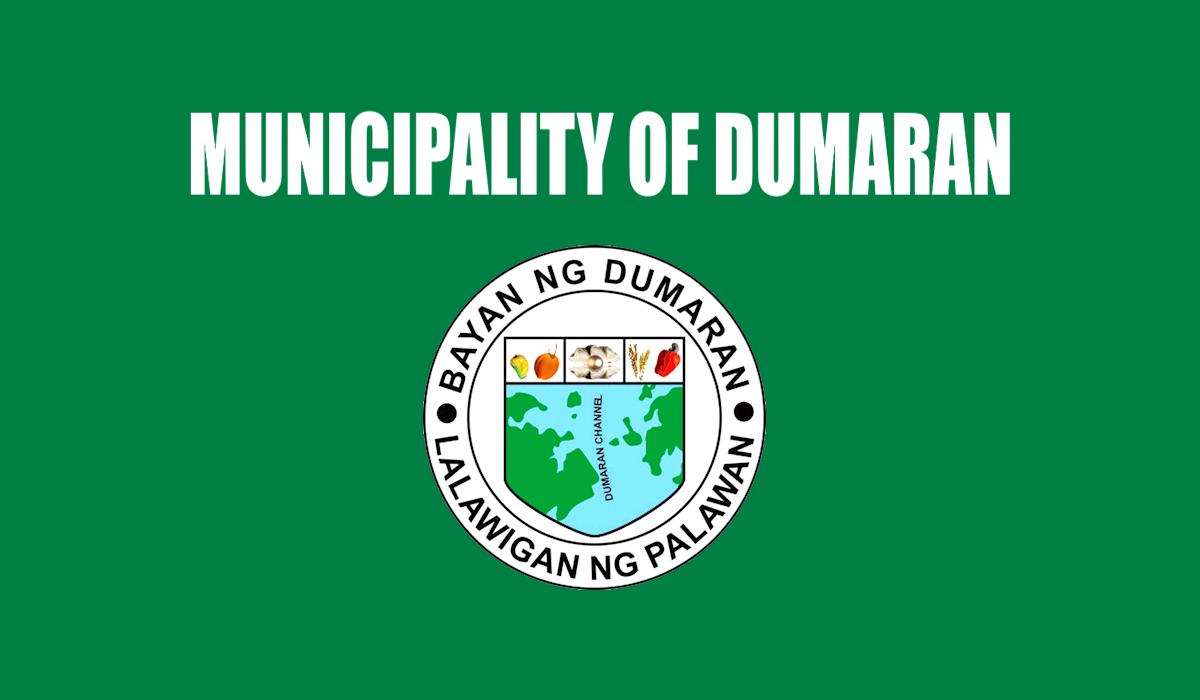
- Flag Seal

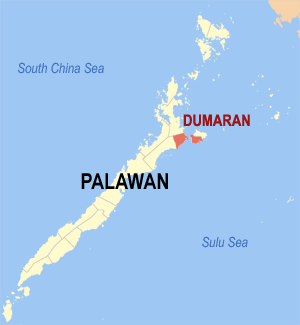
- Map of Palawan with Dumaran highlighted
- Interactive map of Dumaran
- Location within the Philippines
- Coordinates: 10°32′N 119°46′E
- Country: Philippines
- Region: Mimaropa
- Province: Palawan
- District: 1st district
- Barangays: 16 (see Barangays)

Government
  - Type: Sangguniang Bayan
  - Mayor: Richard R. Herrera
  - Vice Mayor: Jenifer F. Adier
  - Representative: Rosalie Salvame
  - Municipal Council: Members: Carlito L. Baac; Ricardo F. Castro Jr.; Jim P. Dolor; Judy P. Parangue; Jenifer F. Adier; Vicente M. Cabanillas; Nazer F. Samudio; Elidora M. Lapides
  - Electorate: 15,385 voters (2025)

Area
  - Total: 435.00 km^{2} (167.95 sq mi)
- Elevation: 20 m (66 ft)
- Highest elevation: 165 m (541 ft)
- Lowest elevation: 0 m (0 ft)

Population (2024 census)
  - Total: 23,795
  - Density: 54.701/km^{2} (141.68/sq mi)
  - Households: 5,714

Economy
  - Income class: 1st municipal income class
  - Poverty incidence: 26.25% (2023)
  - Revenue: ₱ 275.4 million (2024)
  - Assets: ₱ 733.7 million (2024)
  - Expenditure: ₱ 267.7 million (2024)
  - Liabilities: ₱ 176.8 million (2024)

Service provider
  - Electricity: Palawan Electric Cooperative (PALECO)
- Time zone: UTC+8 (PST)
- ZIP code: 5310
- PSGC: 1705311000
- IDD : area code: +63 (0)48
- Native languages: Palawano; Tagalog

Dumaran, officially the Municipality of Dumaran (Tagalog: Bayan ng Dumaran), is a municipality in the Philippine Province of Palawan. According to the 2024 census, it has a population of 23,795 people.

It is known for Banawa Sand Bar which features beach, clear waters, and coral reefs.

== History ==
=== Pre-colonial and Spanish era ===
During pre-colonial times, Dumaran was the place of a chiefdom called Bacao, which was the Tagbanua word for mangroves due to the presence of mangroves in the area, where the barangay of Bacao lies today. This place was frequented by Cuyonons from Cuyo Island who came there to both settle and trade. During the Spanish era, it was a part of the town of Araceli.

=== Modern era ===
Dumaran was formerly a part of Araceli before being separated in 1961, composed of the barrios Dumaran, Bacao, Bohol, Calasag, and San Juan. It became effective later in the year after the election of municipal officials.

== Geography ==
Dumaran is a municipality in the Philippine Province of Palawan. Located in the northeastern part of Palawan, it encompasses a portion of mainland Palawan Island and Dumaran Island. It was established as a municipality in 1961, and covers a land area of 435 km^{2} (168 sq mi) across 16 barangays. It is bounded on the north-east by Municipality of Araceli, on the south by Sulu Sea, on the south-west by Roxas, and on the north-west by the municipality of Taytay. The first settlers arrived in 1875 from Cuyo, and the town was established as a municipality in 1961 under Republic Act No. 3418. While the region was covered with evergreen forests, much of it was converted into agricultural lands. The remaining forest area is home to more than 136 species of fauna including the endangered Philippine cockatoo, Philippine pangolin and Palawan forest turtle.

=== Climate ===
Climate data for Dumaran, Palawan
Month	Jan	Feb	Mar	Apr	May	Jun	Jul	Aug	Sep	Oct	Nov	Dec	Year
Mean daily maximum °C (°F)	29 (84)	30 (86)	30 (86)	31 (88)	31 (88)	30 (86)	29 (84)	30 (86)	29 (84)	29 (84)	29 (84)	29 (84)	30 (85)
Mean daily minimum °C (°F)	23 (73)	23 (73)	23 (73)	24 (75)	25 (77)	25 (77)	25 (77)	24 (75)	24 (75)	24 (75)	24 (75)	24 (75)	24 (75)
Average precipitation mm (inches)	45 (1.8)	34 (1.3)	62 (2.4)	64 (2.5)	127 (5.0)	159 (6.3)	172 (6.8)	147 (5.8)	167 (6.6)	182 (7.2)	172 (6.8)	88 (3.5)	1,419 (56)
Average rainy days	12.1	9.4	13.0	14.3	22.7	26.9	28.0	26.4	27.0	27.0	22.7	17.8	247.3
Source: Meteoblue

== Demographics ==
Population census of Dumaran

Year	Pop.	±% p.a.
1918	1,569	—
1939	2,885	+2.94%
1948	3,497	+2.16%
1970	5,158	+1.78%
1975	7,019	+6.37%
1980	8,402	+3.66%
1990	12,624	+4.16%

Year	Pop.	±% p.a.
1995	13,980	+1.93%
2000	16,616	+3.77%
2007	18,737	+1.67%
2010	21,397	+4.95%
2015	23,734	+1.99%
2020	23,528	−0.18%
2024	23,795	+0.27%

Source: Philippine Statistics Authority

As per the 2024 census, the population of Dumaran was 23,795 people, with a density of 55 inhabitants per square kilometre or 140 inhabitants per square mile. The population consisted of 12,154 males and 11,333 females. The population is predominantly Roman Catholic, with a minority of other religious groups.

== Economy ==
Poverty incidence of Dumaran (%)

Source: Philippine Statistics Authority

The economy is based on agriculture and fishing. Agricultural produce include coconut, and rice. The region also has rich natural resources, and tourism is a developing industry. In relation to its foundation day on June 14, Dumaran celebrates the annual Kalabukay Festival from June 14–18.

== Transportation ==
Dumaran can be reached by commercial ships and ferry from Manila, Iloilo, and Puerto Princesa. Puerto Princesa has an airport, and is connected to Dumaran by road.

== Culture ==
Kalabukay Festival is an annual festival celebrated to mark the foundation day in Dumaran.

== Education ==
The Dumaran Schools District Office governs all educational institutions within the municipality. It oversees the management and operations of all private and public, from primary to secondary schools.

=== Primary and elementary schools ===
- Bacao Elementary School
- Bohol Elementary School
- Cabugawan Elementary School
- Calasag Elementary School
- Catep Elementary School
- Dumaran Central School
- Jose P. Pacardo Sr. Elementary School
- Nagpadalan Elementary School
- Pedro Navarro Elementary School
- San Juan Elementary School
- Sto. Tomas Elementary School
- Salvacion Elementary School

=== Secondary schools ===
- Bacao National High School
- Bohol National High School
- Dumaran National High School
