= Roxas, Palawan =

Municipality in Palawan, Philippines

Roxas
- Municipality
- Municipality of Roxas
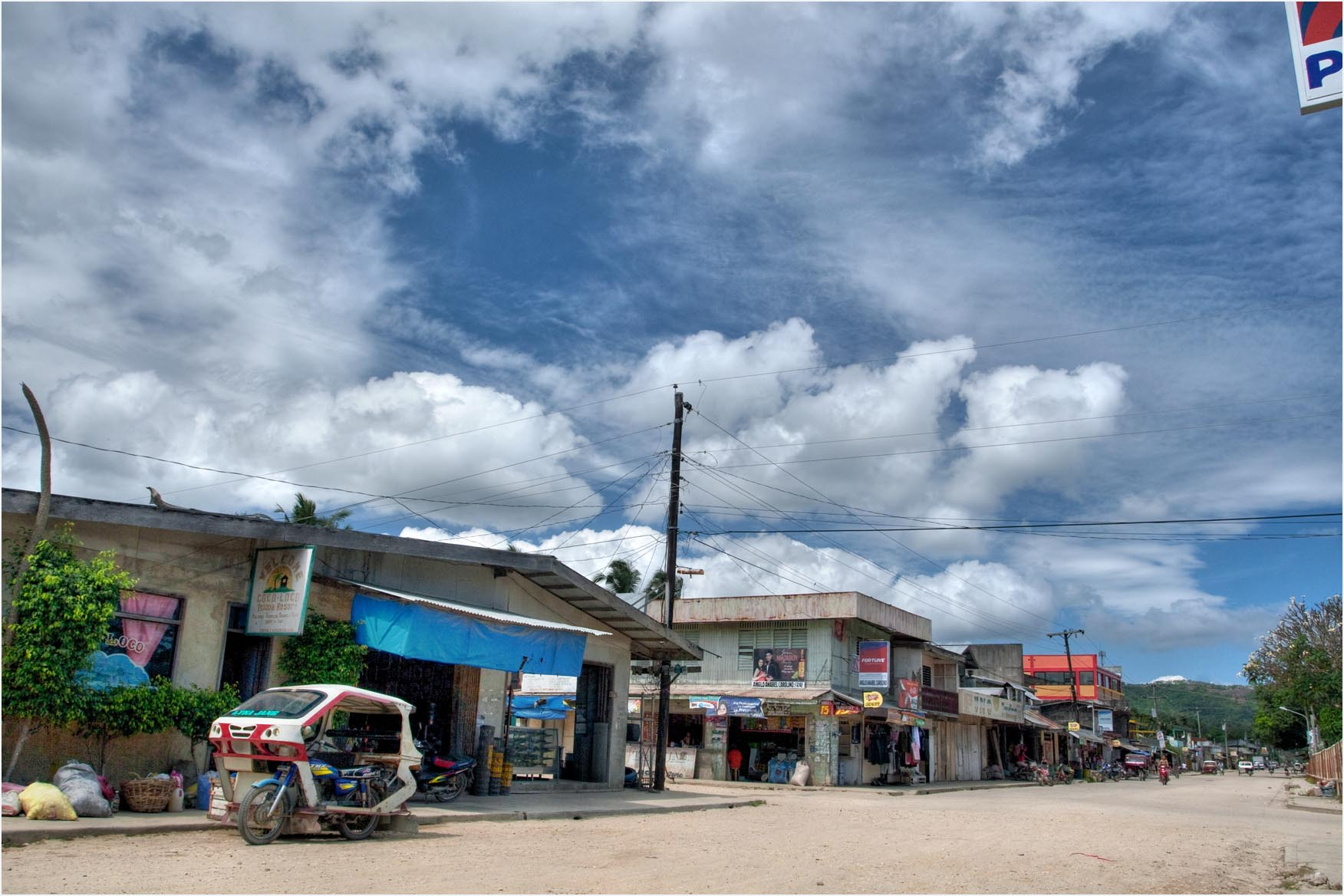
- Downtown area

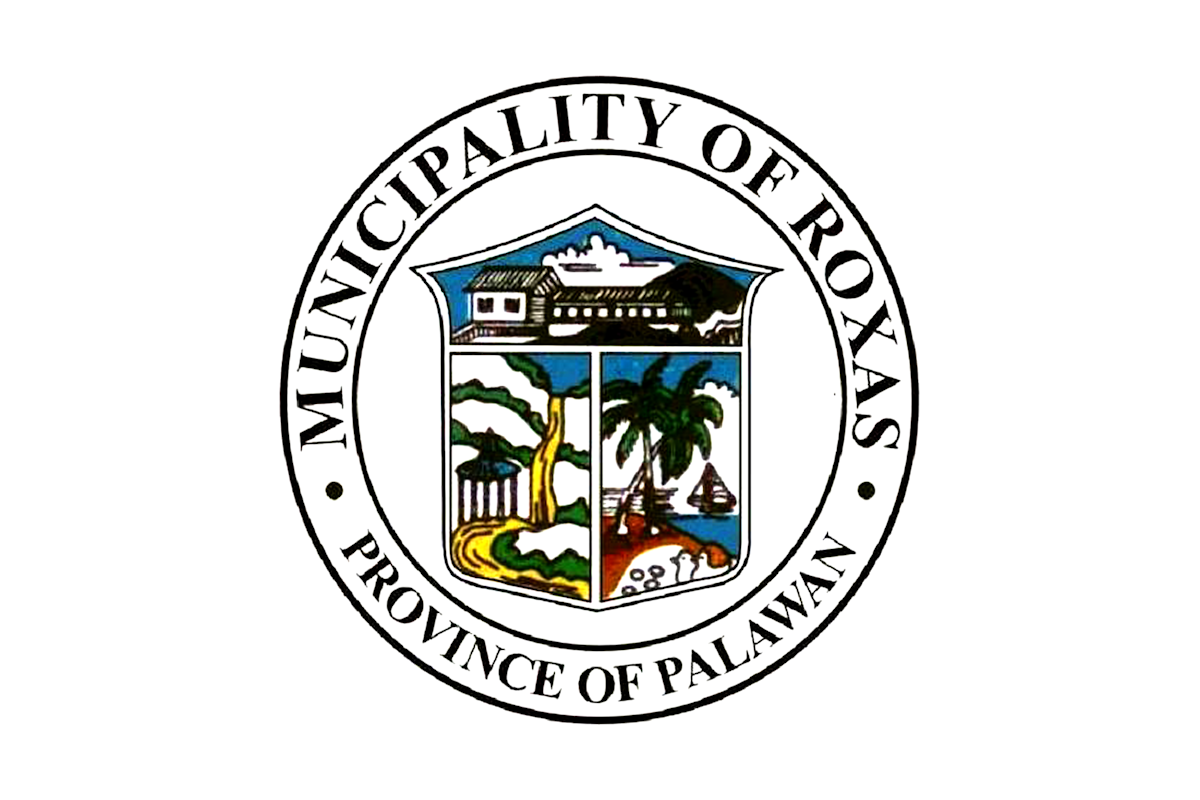
- Flag

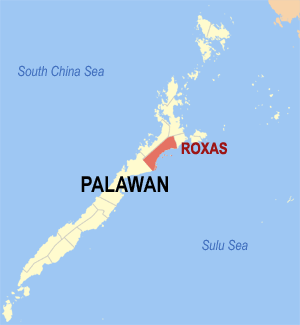
- Map of Palawan with Roxas highlighted
- Interactive map of Roxas
- Location within the Philippines
- Coordinates: 10°19′11″N 119°20′27″E
- Country: Philippines
- Region: Mimaropa
- Province: Palawan
- District: 1st district
- Founded: May 15, 1951
- Named for: Manuel Roxas
- Barangays: 31 (see Barangays)

Government
  - Type: Sangguniang Bayan
  - Mayor: Pedy B. Sabando
  - Vice Mayor: Alfredo B. Enojas Jr.
  - Representative: Rosalie Salvame
  - Municipal Council: Members: Jesus V. Miraflores; Bernie V. Valdez; Garardo C. Ganardo; Henry U. Acosta; Loida M. Sebido; Grace E. Bañes; Alijotham C. Favila; Wilfredo L. Magdayao
  - Electorate: 45,968 voters (2025)

Area
  - Total: 1,177.56 km^{2} (454.66 sq mi)
- Elevation: 28 m (92 ft)
- Highest elevation: 303 m (994 ft)
- Lowest elevation: 0 m (0 ft)

Population (2024 census)
  - Total: 69,729
  - Density: 59.215/km^{2} (153.37/sq mi)
  - Households: 17,287

Economy
  - Income class: 1st municipal income class
  - Poverty incidence: 16.69% (2023)
  - Revenue: ₱ 558.8 million (2024)
  - Assets: ₱ 1,527 million (2024)
  - Expenditure: ₱ 487.9 million (2024)
  - Liabilities: ₱ 522.5 million (2024)

Service provider
  - Electricity: Palawan Electric Cooperative (PALECO)
- Time zone: UTC+8 (PST)
- ZIP code: 5308
- PSGC: 1705318000
- IDD : area code: +63 (0)48
- Native languages: Ibatag; Palawano; Tagalog

Roxas, officially the Municipality of Roxas (Hiligaynon: Banwa sang Roxas; Cuyonon: Banwa 'ang Roxas; Tagalog: Bayan ng Roxas), is a municipality in the province of Palawan, Philippines. According to the 2024 census, it has a population of 69,729 people.

== History ==
Roxas was created under Republic Act No. 615 in 1951 from the barrios of Tinitian, Caramay, Rizal, Del Pilar, Malcampo, Tumarbong, Taradungan, Ilian, and Capayas of Puerto Princesa.

== Geography ==
Roxas is located on the eastern coast of Palawan facing the Sulu Sea. It is 135 kilometres (84 mi) from Puerto Princesa.

=== Barangays ===
Roxas is politically subdivided into 31 barangays. Each barangay consists of puroks and some have sitios.

Bagong Bayan was formerly a sitio of Ilian which is now part of the municipality of Dumaran).

- Abaroan
- Antonino
- Bagong Bayan
- Barangay 1 (Poblacion)
- Barangay II (Poblacion)
- Barangay III (Poblacion)
- Barangay IV (Poblacion)
- Barangay V (Poblacion) (Porao Island)
- Barangay VI (Poblacion) (Johnson Island)
- Caramay
- Dumarao
- Iraan
- Jolo
- Magara (Arasan)
- Malcampo
- Mendoza
- Narra (Minara)
- New Barbacan (Retac)
- New Cuyo
- Nicanor Zabala
- Rizal
- Salvacion
- San Isidro
- San Jose
- San Miguel
- San Nicolas
- Sandoval
- Tagumpay
- Taradungan
- Tinitian
- Tumarbong

=== Climate ===
Climate data for Roxas, Palawan
Month	Jan	Feb	Mar	Apr	May	Jun	Jul	Aug	Sep	Oct	Nov	Dec	Year
Mean daily maximum °C (°F)	29 (84)	30 (86)	30 (86)	31 (88)	30 (86)	30 (86)	29 (84)	29 (84)	29 (84)	29 (84)	29 (84)	29 (84)	30 (85)
Mean daily minimum °C (°F)	23 (73)	22 (72)	23 (73)	24 (75)	25 (77)	25 (77)	25 (77)	25 (77)	25 (77)	25 (77)	24 (75)	24 (75)	24 (75)
Average precipitation mm (inches)	56 (2.2)	38 (1.5)	68 (2.7)	71 (2.8)	157 (6.2)	208 (8.2)	212 (8.3)	194 (7.6)	216 (8.5)	218 (8.6)	189 (7.4)	107 (4.2)	1,734 (68.2)
Average rainy days	12.9	10.5	14.3	15.9	24.6	27.6	28.6	27.4	27.8	27.5	23.5	18.6	259.2
Source: Meteoblue (modeled/calculated data, not measured locally)

== Demographics ==
Population census of Roxas

Year	Pop.	±% p.a.
1960	9,329	—
1970	16,341	+5.76%
1975	19,976	+4.11%
1980	24,890	+4.50%
1990	36,604	+3.93%
1995	44,370	+3.67%

Year	Pop.	±% p.a.
2000	47,242	+1.35%
2007	51,084	+1.08%
2010	61,058	+6.71%
2015	65,358	+1.30%
2020	69,624	+1.34%
2024	69,729	+0.04%

Source: Philippine Statistics Authority

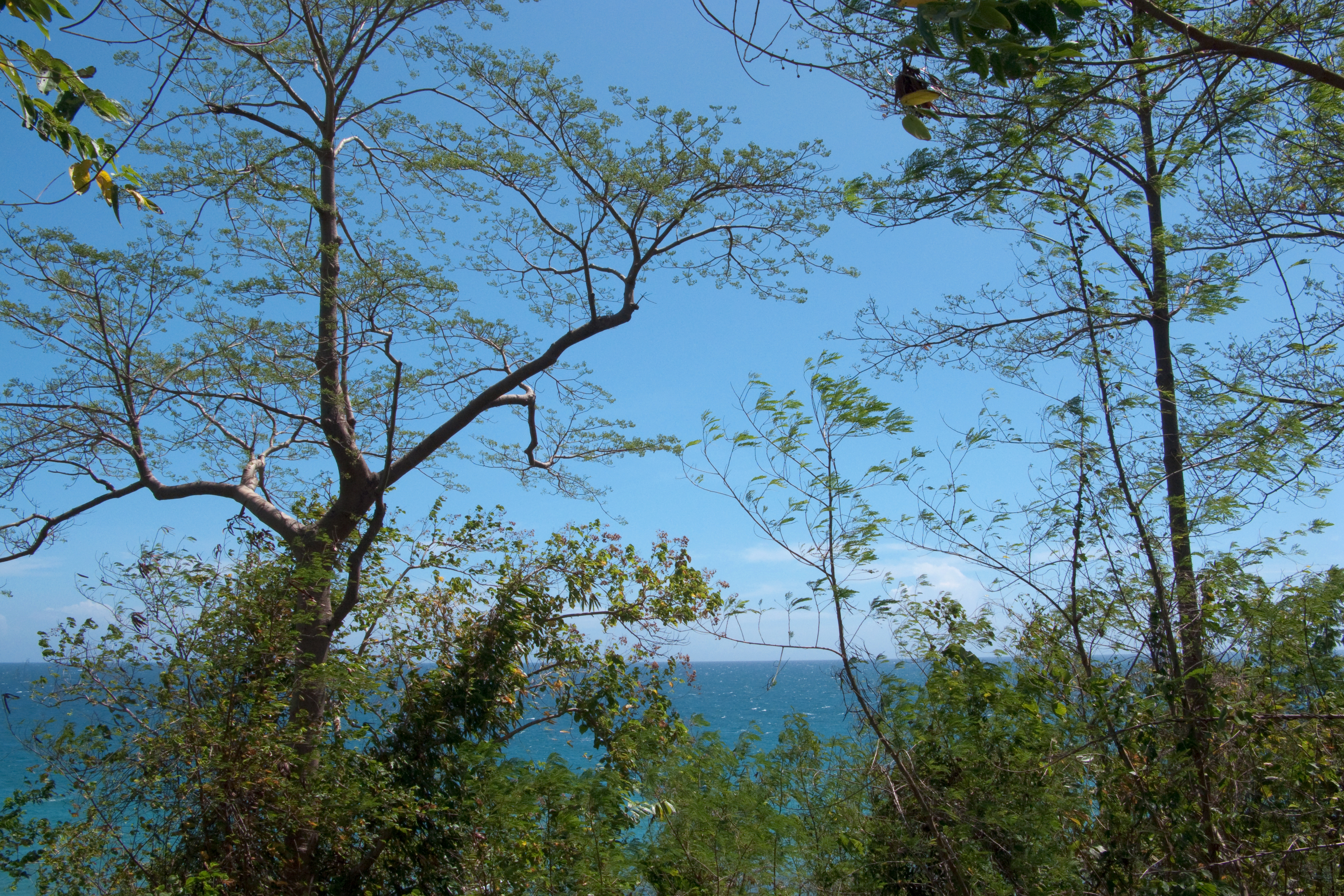
Flora on the coast of Sulu Sea

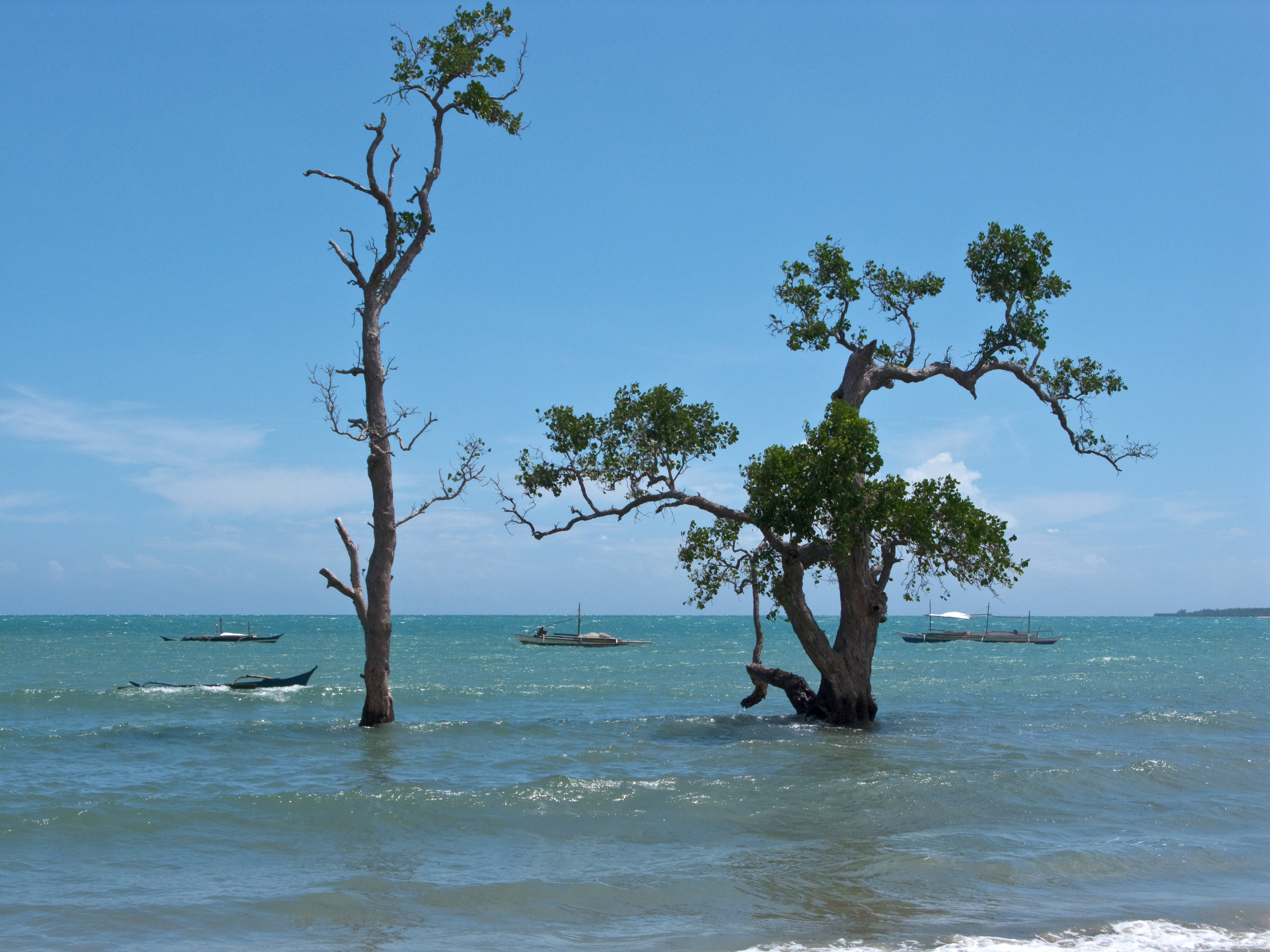
The coast of Sulu Sea, Roxas Municipality

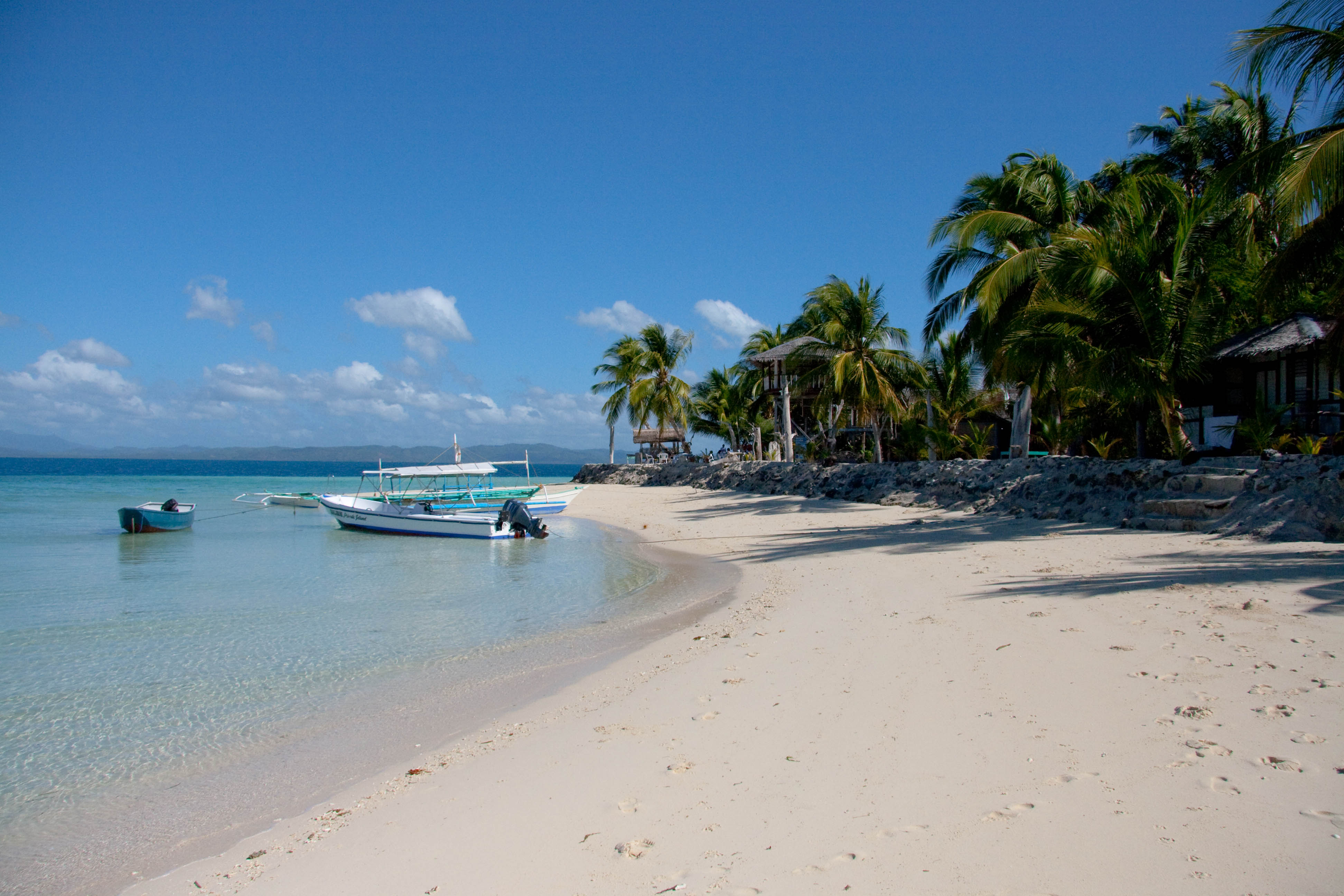
Coco Loco Island Resort in Roxas

In the 2024 census, the population of Roxas was 69,729 people, with a density of 59 inhabitants per square kilometre or 150 inhabitants per square mile.

== Economy ==
Poverty incidence of Roxas (%)

Source: Philippine Statistics Authority

== Education ==
There are three schools district offices which govern all educational institutions within the municipality. They oversee the management and operations of all private and public, from primary to secondary schools. These are the

- Roxas Central Schools District
- Roxas North Schools District
- Roxas South Schools District

=== Primary and elementary schools ===
- Abaroan Elementary School
- Agustin Ello Elementary School
- Andres Soriano Memorial Elementary School
- Antonino Elementary School
- Arasan Elementary School
- Bagong Bayan Elementary School
- Bagong Silang Elementary School
- Balai Ya Pag-Adalan Kat Mga Katutubo Elementary School
- Buayan Elementary School
- Candelaria Elementary School
- Capalan Elementary School
- Caramay Elementary School
- Dumarao Elementary School
- Francisco F. Ponce de Leon Elementary School
- Green Island Elementary School
- Ibangan Elementary School
- Iraan Elementary School
- Johnson Elementary School
- Jolo Elementary School
- Little Caramay Elementary School
- Magara Elementary School
- Magara School for Philippine Craftsmen
- Malabusog Elementary School
- Malcampo Elementary School
- Maragoc Elementary School
- Maranatha Christian Academy
- Matalangao Elementary School
- Maykawayan Elementary School
- Mendoza Elementary School
- Nanabu Indigenous People Elementary School
- Narra Elementary School
- New Barbacan Elementary School
- New Cuyo Elementary School
- Nicanor Zabala Elementary School
- Pedro Baquiao Memorial Elementary School
- Ramon Gacayan Elementary School
- Rizal Elementary School
- Rodriguez Elementary School
- Roxas Baptist Christian Academy
- Roxas Bible Baptist Christian Academy
- Roxas North Central School
- Salvacion Elementary School
- Salvador Elementary School
- San Dionisio Elementary School
- San Isidro Elementary School
- San Jose Elementary School
- San Miguel Elementary School
- San Nicolas Elementary School
- Sandoval Elementary School
- Shell Island Elementary School
- Tagumpay Elementary School
- Taradungan Elementary School
- Tinitian Elementary School
- Trinidad Cario Elementary School
- Tulariquen Elementary School
- Tumarbong Elementary School

=== Secondary schools ===
- Abaroan National High School
- Dumarao Brgy. High School
- F. Lagan Sr. Memorial National High School (Caramay National High School)
- Green Island National High School
- Mendoza National Agricultural High School
- Nicanor Zabala National High School
- Roxas National Comprehensive High School
- San Jose (Roxas) National High School
- Tagumpay National High School
- Tinitian National High School
- Tumarbong National High School
