= Gaddang =

Gaddang or Ga'dang may be,

- Gaddang people, a people of the Northern Luzon, Philippines
  - Gaddang language or Cagayan, their Austronesian language
  - Ga'dang language, an Austronesian language

== See also ==
- Cagayan (disambiguation)
