= Linapacan =

Municipality in Palawan, Philippines

- Municipality
- Municipality of Linapacan
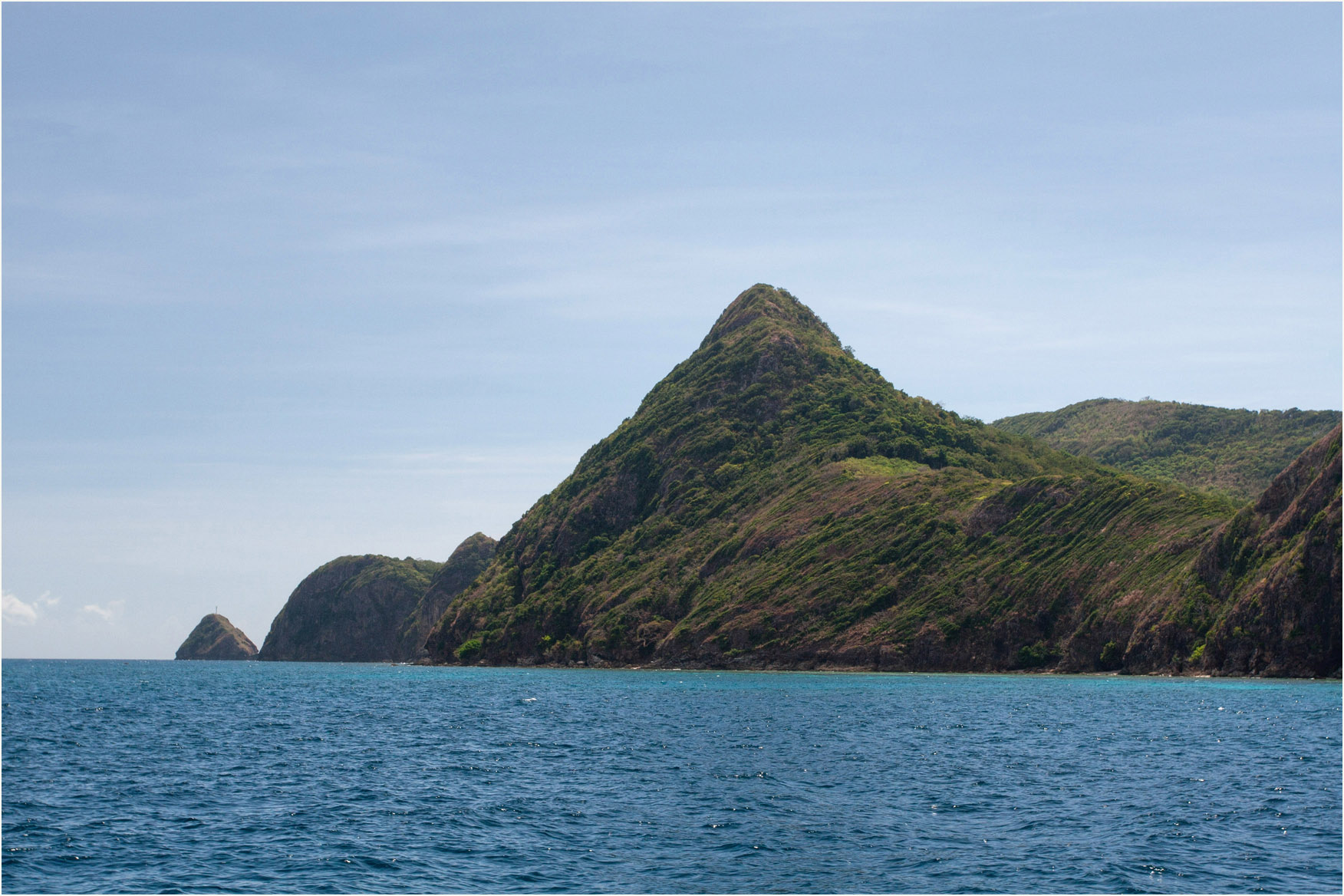
- Decabaitot Island

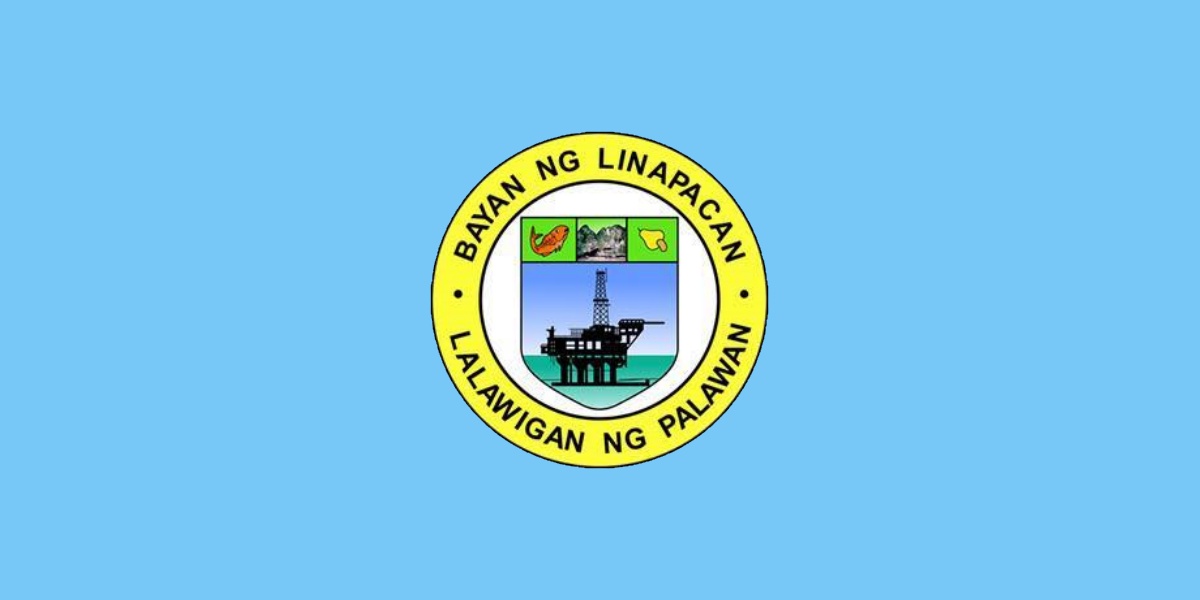
- Flag Seal

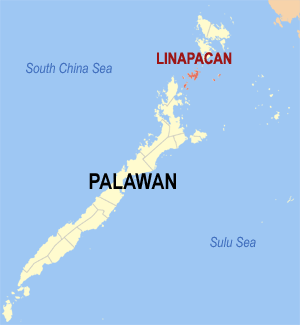
- Map of Palawan with Linapacan highlighted
- Interactive map of Linapacan
- Location within the Philippines
- Coordinates: 11°29′31″N 119°52′16″E
- Country: Philippines
- Region: Mimaropa
- Province: Palawan
- District: 1st district
- Founded: June 12, 1954
- Barangays: 10 (see Barangays)

Government
  - Type: Sangguniang Bayan
  - Mayor: Emil T. Neri
  - Vice Mayor: Ricky C. Rodriguez
  - Representative: Rosalie Salvame
  - Municipal Council: Members: Ricky C. Rodriguez; Noel A. Cabrestante; Angel M. Rey; Harry A. Collado; Pablo R. Palanca Jr.; Jimmy U. Alaska; Dory G. Sedeste; Maria Salvacion D. Villano
  - Electorate: 10,354 voters (2025)

Area
  - Total: 195.44 km^{2} (75.46 sq mi)
- Elevation: 10.2 m (33 ft)
- Highest elevation (Mount Olo): 244 m (801 ft)
- Lowest elevation: 0 m (0 ft)

Population (2024 census)
  - Total: 16,782
  - Density: 85.868/km^{2} (222.40/sq mi)
  - Households: 3,847

Economy
  - Income class: 3rd municipal income class
  - Poverty incidence: 41.13% (2023)
  - Revenue: ₱ 145.1 million (2024)
  - Assets: ₱ 387.8 million (2024)
  - Expenditure: ₱ 113.5 million (2024)
  - Liabilities: ₱ 84.08 million (2024)

Service provider
  - Electricity: Busuanga Island Electric Cooperative (BISELCO)
- Time zone: UTC+8 (PST)
- ZIP code: 5314
- PSGC: 1705313000
- IDD : area code: +63 (0)48
- Native languages: Palawano; Tagalog

Linapacan, officially the Municipality of Linapacan (Tagalog: Bayan ng Linapacan), is a municipality in the province of Palawan, Philippines. According to the 2024 census, it has a population of 16,782 people.

== History ==
=== Spanish era ===
When the Spaniards came in the 16th century, it was made a part of Coron as the barrio of San Miguel. Afterwards, they made a fortress called Caseledan Port and Eli Port to be able to protect against Moro raiders.

=== Modern era ===
In 1954, the 10 islands of Barangonan, Cabunlawan, Calibangbangan, Decabaitot, Maroyogroyog, Nangalao, New Calaylayan, Pical, San Miguel, and San Nicolas were separated from Coron to form the town of Linapacan. The municipality of Culion is between Linapacan and Coron.

On November 4, 1988, Linapacan was renamed to Gaudencio E. Abordo by virtue of Republic Act No. 6680, after the former representative and governor of Palawan. However, the renaming was rejected by the majority of voters during a plebiscite held on May 5, 1994.

In October 2013, the website Daily News Dig proclaimed the waters of Linapacan Island so clear that the website put it on the top of their list of 35 waters to swim in around the world before one dies.

== Geography ==
=== Barangays ===
Linapacan is politically subdivided into 10 island barangays. Each barangay consists of puroks and some have sitios.

- Barangonan (Iloc)
- Cabunlawan
- Calibangbangan
- Decabaitot
- Maroyogroyog
- Nangalao
- New Culaylayan
- Pical
- San Miguel (Poblacion)
- San Nicolas

=== Climate ===
Climate data for Linapacan, Palawan
| Month | Jan | Feb | Mar | Apr | May | Jun | Jul | Aug | Sep | Oct | Nov | Dec | Year |
|---|---|---|---|---|---|---|---|---|---|---|---|---|---|
| Mean daily maximum °C (°F) | 28 (82) | 29 (84) | 29 (84) | 31 (88) | 30 (86) | 29 (84) | 29 (84) | 29 (84) | 29 (84) | 29 (84) | 29 (84) | 28 (82) | 29 (84) |
| Mean daily minimum °C (°F) | 22 (72) | 22 (72) | 22 (72) | 23 (73) | 24 (75) | 24 (75) | 24 (75) | 24 (75) | 24 (75) | 24 (75) | 23 (73) | 23 (73) | 23 (74) |
| Average precipitation mm (inches) | 45 (1.8) | 34 (1.3) | 62 (2.4) | 64 (2.5) | 127 (5.0) | 159 (6.3) | 172 (6.8) | 147 (5.8) | 167 (6.6) | 182 (7.2) | 172 (6.8) | 88 (3.5) | 1,419 (56) |
| Average rainy days | 12.1 | 9.4 | 13.0 | 14.3 | 22.7 | 26.9 | 28.0 | 26.4 | 27.0 | 27.0 | 22.7 | 17.8 | 247.3 |
Source: Meteoblue

== Demographics ==
Population census of Linapacan

| Year | Pop. | ±% p.a. |
|---|---|---|
| 1960 | 2,555 | — |
| 1970 | 3,107 | +1.97% |
| 1975 | 3,671 | +3.40% |
| 1980 | 4,428 | +3.82% |
| 1990 | 5,835 | +2.80% |
| 1995 | 7,269 | +4.20% |

| Year | Pop. | ±% p.a. |
|---|---|---|
| 2000 | 9,198 | +5.18% |
| 2007 | 11,688 | +3.36% |
| 2010 | 14,180 | +7.29% |
| 2015 | 15,668 | +1.92% |
| 2020 | 16,424 | +1.00% |
| 2024 | 16,782 | +0.52% |

Source: Philippine Statistics Authority

In the 2024 census, the population of Linapacan was 16,782 people, with a density of 86 inhabitants per square kilometre or 220 inhabitants per square mile.

== Economy ==
Poverty incidence of Linapacan (%)

Source: Philippine Statistics Authority

== Education ==
The Linapacan Schools District Office governs all educational institutions within the municipality. It oversees the management and operations of all private and public, from primary to secondary schools.

=== Primary and elementary schools ===
- Barangonan Elementary School
- Binalabag Elementary School
- Cabunlawan Elementary School
- Calibangbangan Elementary School
- Decabaitot Elementary School
- Maroyogroyog Elementary School
- Nangalao Elementary School
- New Colaylayan Elementary School
- Old Barangonan Elementary School
- Pangaraycayan Elementary School
- Pical Elementary School
- San Miguel Elementary School
- San Nicolas Elementary School

=== Secondary schools ===
- Gaudencio Abordo National High School
- Bulawit National High School
- Nangalao National High School
- Pical National High School
- San Miguel National High School

== See also ==
- List of islands of the Philippines
