= Kalabukay Festival =

Annual festival in Palawan, Philippines

Kalabukay Festival (Kalabukay: Cuyunon word for red-vented cockatoo) is an annual celebration for the foundation day of the municipality of Dumaran, Palawan in the Philippines. It is also the celebration of the successful preservation of the endangered bird called Katala or Kalabukay and also for the preservation of natural resources of the island.

== History ==
The Kalabukay festival started in 2005 with the effort of the Katala Foundation and the local government of Dumaran. The five-day celebration from 14th to 18 June includes an opening parade, booth exhibit, tree planting, coastal clean-up, basketball competition, and the highlight of the celebration: "Search For Miss Kalabukay".
