= Edgardo Salvame =

Filipino politician

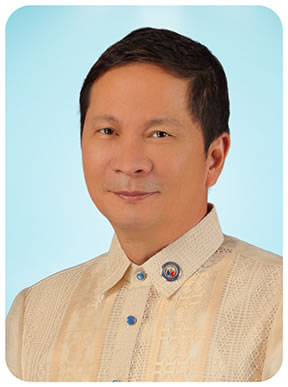
- Official portrait, 2022

Member of the House of Representatives from Palawan's 1st congressional district
- In office June 30, 2022 – March 13, 2024
- Preceded by: Franz Josef Alvarez
- Succeeded by: Rosalie Salvame

Personal details
- Born: 1963
- Died: March 13, 2024 (aged 60–61)
- Party: PRP (2021–2024)
- Spouse: Rosalie Salvame

Edgardo "Egay" Lim Salvame (1963 – March 13, 2024) was a Filipino politician who was a member of the House of Representatives of the Philippines for Palawan's 1st congressional district. He died in office in March 2024. He was succeeded by his wife Rosalie Salvame.

== See also ==
- 19th Congress of the Philippines
