= Palawan's 1st congressional district =

Legislative district of the Philippines

- Constituency for the House of Representatives of the Philippines
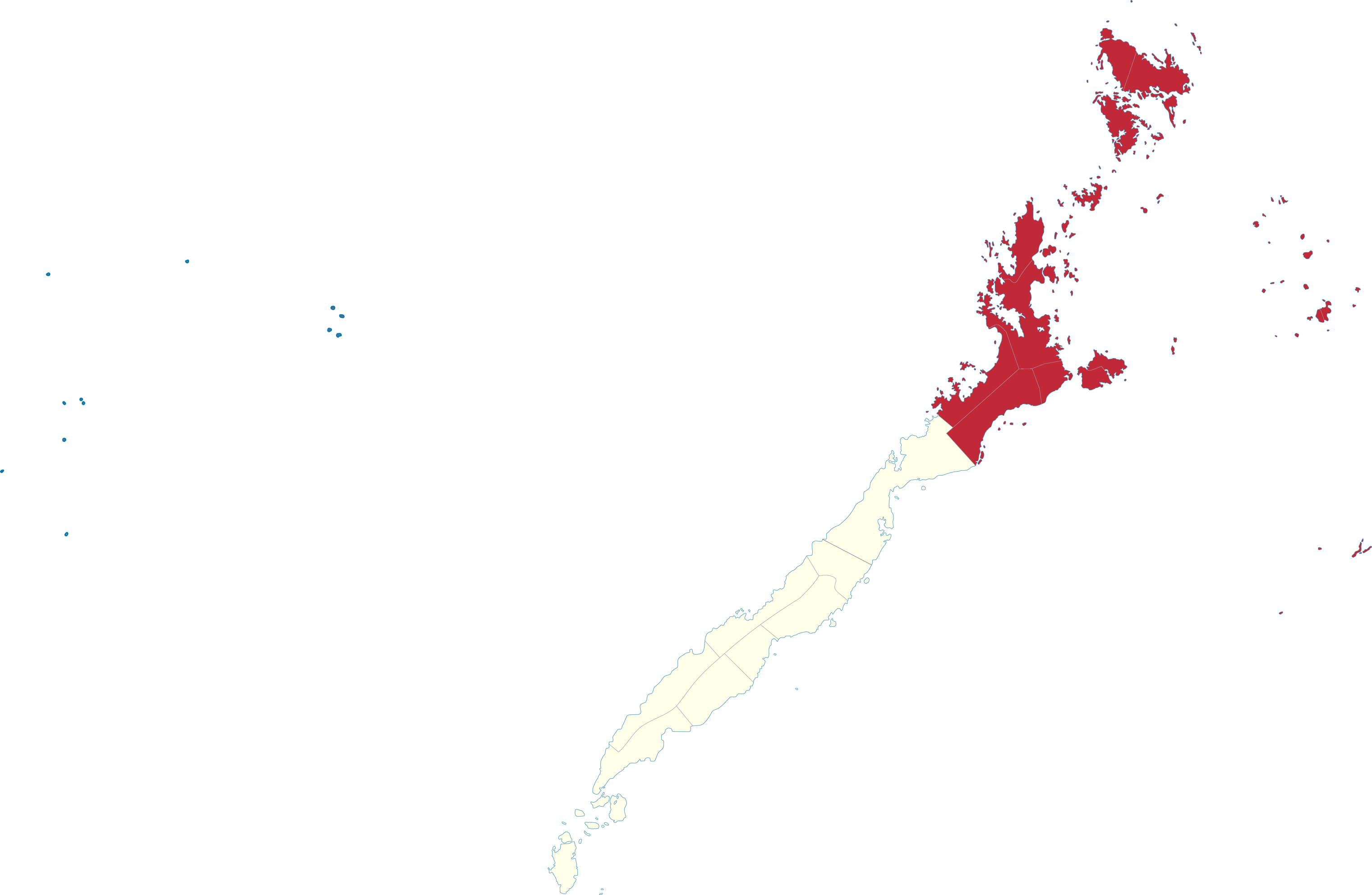
- Boundary of Palawan's 1st congressional district in Palawan

- Location of Palawan within the Philippines
- Province: Palawan
- Region: Mimaropa
- Population: 462,089 (2020)
- Electorate: 302,220 (2025)
- Major settlements: 15 LGUs: Municipalities; Agutaya; Araceli; Busuanga; Cagayancillo; Coron; Culion; Cuyo; Dumaran; El Nido; Kalayaan; Linapacan; Magsaysay; Roxas; San Vicente; Taytay
- Area: 7,725.90 km^{2} (2,982.99 sq mi)

Current constituency
- Created: 1987
- Representative: Rose Salvame
- Political party: NUP
- Congressional bloc: Majority

Palawan's 1st congressional district is one of the three congressional districts of the Philippines in the province of Palawan. It has been represented in the House of Representatives since 1987. The district encompasses the northern portion of Palawan Island including the Calamianes, Cuyo and Kalayaan island (Spartly Islands) chains. It consists of the municipalities of Agutaya, Araceli, Busuanga, Cagayancillo, Coron, Culion, Cuyo, Dumaran, El Nido, Kalayaan, Linapacan, Magsaysay, Roxas, San Vicente and Taytay. The district is currently represented in the 20th Congress by Rose Salvame of the National Unity Party (NUP).

== Representation history ==
#	Image	Member	Term of office		Congress	Party	Electoral history	Constituent LGUs
#	Image	Member	Start	End	Congress	Party	Electoral history	Constituent LGUs
=== Palawan's 1st district for the House of Representatives of the Philippines ===
District created February 2, 1987 from Palawan's at-large district.
1		David A. Ponce de Leon	June 30, 1987	June 30, 1995	8th	PDP–Laban	Elected in 1987.	1987–present Agutaya, Araceli, Busuanga, Cagayancillo, Coron, Culion, Cuyo, Dumaran, El Nido, Kalayaan, Linapacan, Magsaysay, Roxas, San Vicente, Taytay
1		David A. Ponce de Leon	June 30, 1987	June 30, 1995	9th	LDP	Re-elected in 1992.	1987–present Agutaya, Araceli, Busuanga, Cagayancillo, Coron, Culion, Cuyo, Dumaran, El Nido, Kalayaan, Linapacan, Magsaysay, Roxas, San Vicente, Taytay
1		David A. Ponce de Leon	June 30, 1987	June 30, 1995	9th	Lakas	Re-elected in 1992.	1987–present Agutaya, Araceli, Busuanga, Cagayancillo, Coron, Culion, Cuyo, Dumaran, El Nido, Kalayaan, Linapacan, Magsaysay, Roxas, San Vicente, Taytay
2		Vicente A. Sandoval	June 30, 1995	June 30, 2004	10th	Lakas	Elected in 1995.	1987–present Agutaya, Araceli, Busuanga, Cagayancillo, Coron, Culion, Cuyo, Dumaran, El Nido, Kalayaan, Linapacan, Magsaysay, Roxas, San Vicente, Taytay
2		Vicente A. Sandoval	June 30, 1995	June 30, 2004	11th	LDP	Re-elected in 1998.	1987–present Agutaya, Araceli, Busuanga, Cagayancillo, Coron, Culion, Cuyo, Dumaran, El Nido, Kalayaan, Linapacan, Magsaysay, Roxas, San Vicente, Taytay
2		Vicente A. Sandoval	June 30, 1995	June 30, 2004	12th	Lakas	Re-elected in 2001.	1987–present Agutaya, Araceli, Busuanga, Cagayancillo, Coron, Culion, Cuyo, Dumaran, El Nido, Kalayaan, Linapacan, Magsaysay, Roxas, San Vicente, Taytay
3		Antonio C. Alvarez	June 30, 2004	June 30, 2013	13th	KAMPI	Elected in 2004.	1987–present Agutaya, Araceli, Busuanga, Cagayancillo, Coron, Culion, Cuyo, Dumaran, El Nido, Kalayaan, Linapacan, Magsaysay, Roxas, San Vicente, Taytay
3		Antonio C. Alvarez	June 30, 2004	June 30, 2013	14th	Lakas	Re-elected in 2007.	1987–present Agutaya, Araceli, Busuanga, Cagayancillo, Coron, Culion, Cuyo, Dumaran, El Nido, Kalayaan, Linapacan, Magsaysay, Roxas, San Vicente, Taytay
3		Antonio C. Alvarez	June 30, 2004	June 30, 2013	15th	NUP	Re-elected in 2010.	1987–present Agutaya, Araceli, Busuanga, Cagayancillo, Coron, Culion, Cuyo, Dumaran, El Nido, Kalayaan, Linapacan, Magsaysay, Roxas, San Vicente, Taytay
4		Franz Josef Alvarez	June 30, 2013	June 30, 2022	16th	NUP	Elected in 2013.	1987–present Agutaya, Araceli, Busuanga, Cagayancillo, Coron, Culion, Cuyo, Dumaran, El Nido, Kalayaan, Linapacan, Magsaysay, Roxas, San Vicente, Taytay
4		Franz Josef Alvarez	June 30, 2013	June 30, 2022	17th	NUP	Re-elected in 2016.	1987–present Agutaya, Araceli, Busuanga, Cagayancillo, Coron, Culion, Cuyo, Dumaran, El Nido, Kalayaan, Linapacan, Magsaysay, Roxas, San Vicente, Taytay
4		Franz Josef Alvarez	June 30, 2013	June 30, 2022	18th	NUP	Re-elected in 2019.	1987–present Agutaya, Araceli, Busuanga, Cagayancillo, Coron, Culion, Cuyo, Dumaran, El Nido, Kalayaan, Linapacan, Magsaysay, Roxas, San Vicente, Taytay
5		Edgardo L. Salvame	June 30, 2022	March 13, 2024	19th	PRP	Elected in 2022. Died.	1987–present Agutaya, Araceli, Busuanga, Cagayancillo, Coron, Culion, Cuyo, Dumaran, El Nido, Kalayaan, Linapacan, Magsaysay, Roxas, San Vicente, Taytay
6		Rose Salvame	June 30, 2025	Incumbent	20th	PRP	Elected in 2025.	1987–present Agutaya, Araceli, Busuanga, Cagayancillo, Coron, Culion, Cuyo, Dumaran, El Nido, Kalayaan, Linapacan, Magsaysay, Roxas, San Vicente, Taytay
6		Rose Salvame	June 30, 2025	Incumbent	20th	NUP	Elected in 2025.	1987–present Agutaya, Araceli, Busuanga, Cagayancillo, Coron, Culion, Cuyo, Dumaran, El Nido, Kalayaan, Linapacan, Magsaysay, Roxas, San Vicente, Taytay

== Election results ==
=== 2025 ===
Candidate	Party	Votes	%
Rose Salvame	People's Reform Party	145,701	59.14
Franz Josef Alvarez	National Unity Party	100,653	40.86
Total		246,354	100.00
Valid votes		246,354	95.73
Invalid/blank votes		10,983	4.27
Total votes		257,337	100.00
Registered voters/turnout		302,220	85.15
People's Reform Party hold			
Source: Commission on Elections

=== 2022 ===
Candidate	Party	Votes	%
Edgardo Salvame	People's Reform Party	107,750	47.35
Aca Alvarez	National Unity Party	85,964	37.78
Rica Reyes	Partido Federal ng Pilipinas	30,787	13.53
Toots Benipayo	Kilusang Bagong Lipunan	3,043	1.34
Total		227,544	100.00
Total votes		250,217	–
Registered voters/turnout		292,031	85.68
People's Reform Party gain from National Unity Party			
Source: Commission on Elections

== See also ==
- Legislative districts of Palawan
