= Cuyo Airport =

Airport in Cuyo, Palawan, Philippines

Cuyo Airport Paliparan ng Cuyo
- IATA: CYU; ICAO: RPLO

Summary
- Airport type: Public
- Owner/Operator: Civil Aviation Authority of the Philippines
- Serves: Cuyo
- Elevation AMSL: 4 m / 13 ft
- Coordinates: 10°51′29″N 121°4′10″E

Map

Runways
Direction	Length		Surface
Direction	m	ft	Surface
04/22	1,524	5,000	Gravel

Cuyo Airport (IATA: CYU, ICAO: RPLO) is an airport serving the municipalities of Magsaysay, Cuyo, and Agutaya. It is located within the boundaries of Barangay, Lucbuan and Emilod, in the town of Magsaysay on the main island of Cuyo Island. It is one of several airports in Palawan, the other being Puerto Princesa International Airport, Cesar Lim Rodriguez Airport, El Nido Airport and Francisco Reyes Airport in the municipality of Busuanga. It is classified as a feeder airport by the Civil Aviation Authority of the Philippines, a body of the Department of Transportation that is responsible for the operations of not only this airport but also of all other airports in the Philippines except the major international airports.

== See also ==
- List of airports in the Philippines
