= Cagayancillo =

Municipality in Palawan, Philippines

- Municipality
- Municipality of Cagayancillo
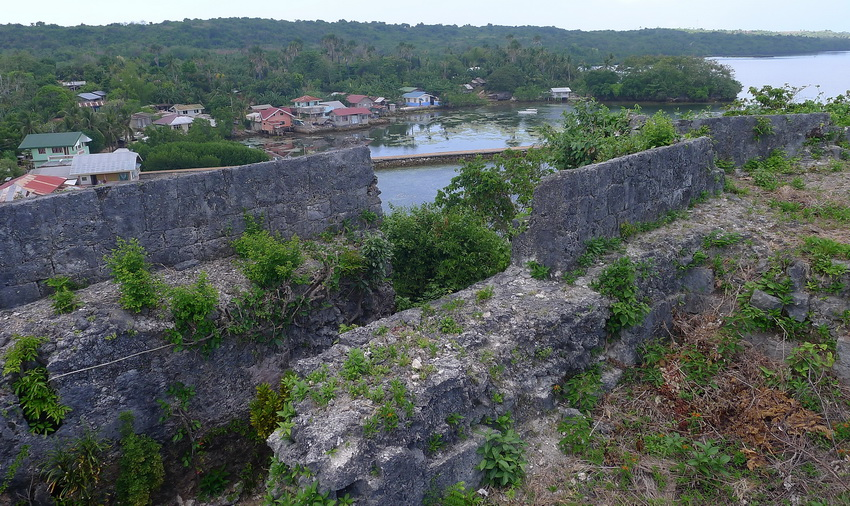
- View from Cagayancillo Fort

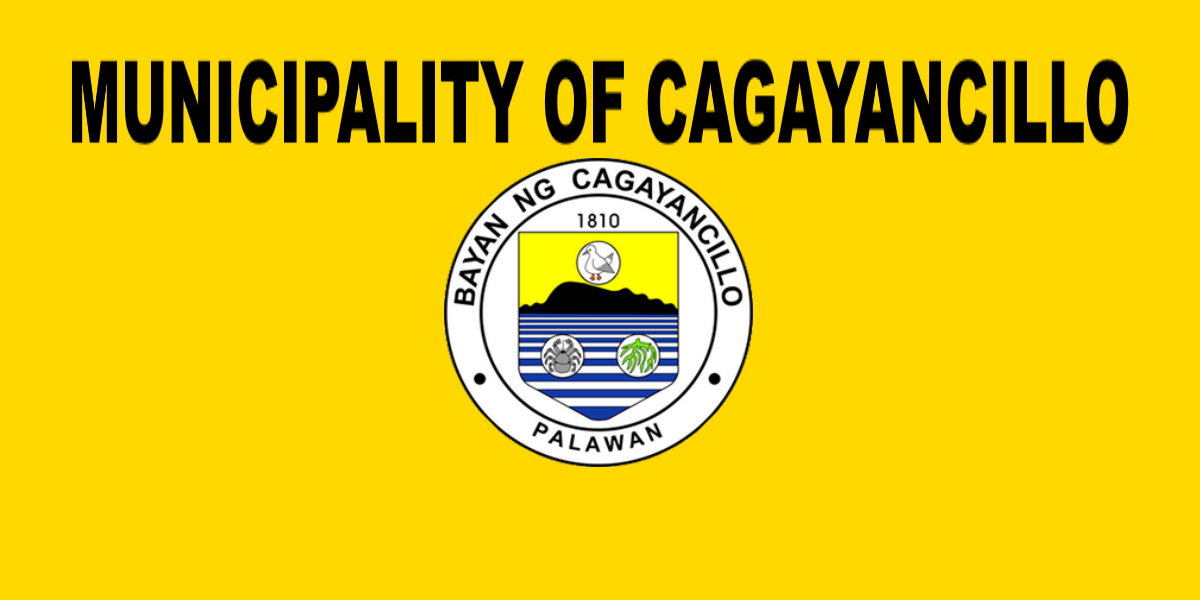
- Flag Seal

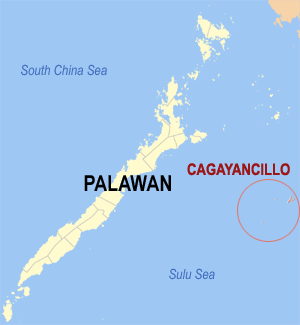
- Map of Palawan with Cagayancillo highlighted
- Interactive map of Cagayancillo
- Location within the Philippines
- Coordinates: 9°34′37″N 121°11′50″E
- Country: Philippines
- Region: Mimaropa
- Province: Palawan
- District: 1st district
- Founded: 1810
- Barangays: 12 (see Barangays)

Government
  - Type: Sangguniang Bayan
  - Mayor: Sergio S. Tapalla
  - Vice Mayor: Lourdes C. Lanoy
  - Representative: Rosalie A. Salvame
  - Municipal Council: Members: Ameliana B. Buñag; Jerry F. Buncag; Noli A. Bundal; Elma C. Favila; Julia T. Dusong; Narciso T. Magbanua; Retchil S. Cayao; Victoria C. Magbanua
  - Electorate: 4,692 voters (2025)

Area
  - Total: 26.39 km^{2} (10.19 sq mi)
- Elevation: 2.0 m (6.6 ft)
- Highest elevation: 62 m (203 ft)
- Lowest elevation: 0 m (0 ft)

Population (2024 census)
  - Total: 7,164
  - Density: 271.5/km^{2} (703.1/sq mi)
  - Households: 1,367

Economy
  - Income class: 5th municipal income class
  - Poverty incidence: 28.42% (2023)
  - Revenue: ₱ 24.81 million (2012), 28.08 million (2013), 31.4 million (2014), 2.893 million (2015), 36.51 million (2016), 43.23 million (2017), 45.79 million (2018), 49.95 million (2019), 60.31 million (2021), 23.7 million (2010), 25.61 million (2011), 72.54 million (2023)
  - Assets: ₱ 21.6 million (2012), 22.28 million (2013), 28.05 million (2014), 41.05 million (2015), 69.57 million (2016), 82.22 million (2017), 91.12 million (2018), 112.2 million (2019), 120.2 million (2021), 10.59 million (2010), 14.48 million (2011), 163.6 million (2023)
  - Expenditure: ₱ 21.89 million (2012), 22.59 million (2013), 23.17 million (2014), 27.17 million (2015), 31.92 million (2016), 32.61 million (2017), 34.83 million (2018), 40.91 million (2019), 51.99 million (2021), 22.39 million (2010), 23.2 million (2011), 56.03 million (2023)
  - Liabilities: ₱ 7.906 million (2012), 7.559 million (2013), 7.178 million (2014), 10.94 million (2015), 22.65 million (2016), 24.7 million (2017), 22.72 million (2018), 38.9 million (2019), 27.49 million (2021), 3.041 million (2010), 4.53 million (2011), 31.34 million (2023)

Service provider
  - Electricity: Palawan Electric Cooperative (PALECO)
- Time zone: UTC+8 (PST)
- ZIP code: 5321
- PSGC: 1705308000
- IDD : area code: +63 (0)48
- Native languages: Kagayanen; Palawano; Tagalog

Cagayancillo, officially the Municipality of Cagayancillo (Tagalog: Bayan ng Cagayancillo), is a municipality in the province of Palawan, Philippines. According to the 2024 census, it has a population of 7,164 people.

Located between the islands of Palawan and Negros in the Sulu Sea, Cagayancillo is the closest settlement to the Tubbataha National Marine Park. The word Cagayancillo is Spanish meaning "Little Cagayan".

== History ==
=== Islamic era ===
Before the Spanish period, Cagayancillo was inhabited by Kagayanen people who belonged to the wider Manobo ethnic group, but Moros from Cagayan de Sulu under the influence of the Sultanate of Sulu eventually settled in the area. This island essentially became one of the many bases for piracy activities around the coasts on the Sulu Sea and beyond.

=== Spanish era ===
During the time of Legazpi in the late 16th century, the island was known to the first Spanish settlers in the Archipelago simply as Cagayan. They describe this territory as "two low islets about fifteen leagues from the island of Panay". They ruled these islets from the town of Arevalo in Iloilo by sailing south-southeast from this part of Panay, to the open sea. The islands are surrounded by many low reefs. But the Spaniards were able to discover their narrow entry, avoiding potential shipping hazards.

During the early period of Spanish colonization, these small islets were inhabited by four hundred people, all of whom were very skillful shipbuilders. They were from Panay, and they came to these islets in order to fortify themselves by the reefs, for fear of pirates. Then they undertook to return to Panay in order to dwell there. But many of their women died there. Seeing this, as they were soothsayers, they returned to the islands of Cagayan, from where they set out every year, and scattered themselves over all the islands to build ships. They built the ships of the Spanish Royal Navy in the Philippines, as well as galleys, galliots, and frigates. They also helped in repairing and righting ships. Being the most important people in the islands for the Spaniards, the adelantado Miguel López de Legazpi allotted their islands to the encomenderos of Negros Island. Afterwards, the colonizers found it best to put them under the direct control of the Spanish Crown. Thus, it was governed from the town of Arevalo in Iloilo.

In the late 17th century, the Spaniards built a fort in Cagayancillo to defend the area from Moro piracy and to continue their missionary works in the island.

Historically, the islands also became part of Antique Province. It was made into a municipality in 1810, with Omabong as its first mayor.

=== American era ===
During the American regime, it came under the jurisdiction of Negros Occidental in 1901. However, on May 14, 1903, the Philippine Commission passed Act No. 747, which officially annexed Cagayancillo, Balabac, and other southern islands to the province of Paragua (present-day Palawan).

=== Modern era ===
In 1959, the following sitios were constituted into barrios of Cagayan now as a part of Palawan:

- The sitios of Banted, Nipay, Dool, Cavili, Cabayog and Langtad, as barrio Talaga;
- The sitios of Ibiok, Panderse, Lato and Gatung-an, as barrio Mampio; and
- Sitio Nusa as Barrio Nusa

== Geography ==
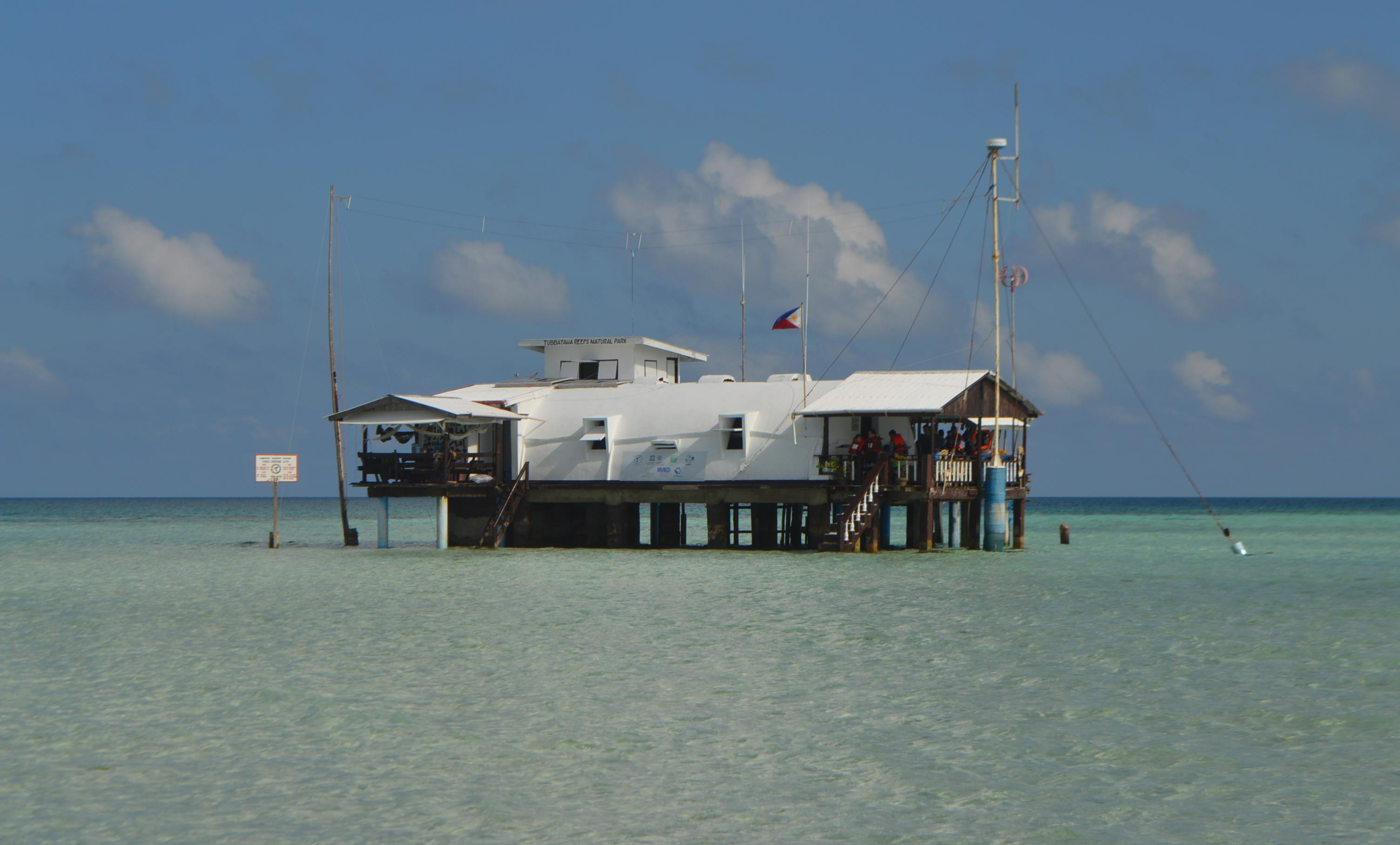
Tubbataha Park Ranger Station

The farthest provincial limit of the province of Palawan in the east is the island of municipality of Cagayancillo. It is approximately 178 nautical miles (330 km) east of Puerto Princesa City and only 72 nautical miles (133 km) south-west of Antique. It is located near the middle of the Sulu Sea.

There are neither mountain ranges nor forested areas in the municipality. A hilly portion in the north-eastern part of the main island has a slope of 3-82%. The other areas are flat with the highest elevation around 2 to 3 meters. The majority of the island has a sandy loam soil not enough to support a forest.

=== Barangays ===
Cagayancillo is the smallest municipality in the province of Palawan with a total land area of only 2,639 hectares (6,520 acres) as of 2007. It is composed of 31 islands and islets and is politically subdivided into 12 barangays and two island sitios (Cavili and Calusa) included under the political jurisdiction of Magsaysay. Each barangay consists of puroks and some have sitios.

- Bantayan (Poblacion)
- Calsada (Poblacion)
- Convento (Poblacion)
- Lipot North (Poblacion)
- Lipot South (Poblacion)
- Magsaysay
- Mampio
- Nusa
- Santa Cruz
- Tacas (Poblacion)
- Talaga
- Wahig (Poblacion)

=== Climate ===
Climate data for Cagayancillo
Month	Jan	Feb	Mar	Apr	May	Jun	Jul	Aug	Sep	Oct	Nov	Dec	Year
Mean daily maximum °C (°F)	27 (81)	27 (81)	27 (81)	28 (82)	29 (84)	29 (84)	28 (82)	28 (82)	28 (82)	28 (82)	28 (82)	27 (81)	28 (82)
Mean daily minimum °C (°F)	26 (79)	26 (79)	26 (79)	27 (81)	28 (82)	28 (82)	28 (82)	27 (81)	27 (81)	27 (81)	27 (81)	26 (79)	27 (81)
Average precipitation mm (inches)	57 (2.2)	55 (2.2)	78 (3.1)	83 (3.3)	217 (8.5)	311 (12.2)	360 (14.2)	331 (13.0)	324 (12.8)	336 (13.2)	232 (9.1)	129 (5.1)	2,513 (98.9)
Average rainy days	11.7	9.6	12.2	12.7	22.4	25.5	26.8	25.7	25.4	25.4	21.5	18.5	237.4
Source: Meteoblue (Use with caution: this is modeled/calculated data, not measured locally.)

Cagayancillo belongs to Type II climate wherein there is no distinct wet or dry season. The dry season is usually from December to May with March as the driest month. The wet season is usually from May to November with August as the rainiest month.

The municipality is exposed to both monsoons. The Amihan or north-east winds blow from November to March while the Habagat or south-west winds visit the area from June to October. The summer months from April to June receive the moderate daplak wind from the north-west.

== Demographics ==
Population census of Cagayancillo

Year	Pop.	±% p.a.
1903	2,448	—
1918	3,198	+1.80%
1939	3,029	−0.26%
1948	4,167	+3.61%
1960	3,880	−0.59%
1970	3,598	−0.75%
1975	4,023	+2.26%
1980	3,992	−0.15%

Year	Pop.	±% p.a.
1990	5,082	+2.44%
1995	6,717	+5.37%
2000	6,348	−1.20%
2007	6,506	+0.34%
2010	7,116	+3.32%
2015	6,285	−2.34%
2020	6,884	+1.93%
2024	7,164	+0.96%

Source: Philippine Statistics Authority

In the 2024 census, the population of Cagayancillo was 7,164 people, with a density of 270 inhabitants per square kilometre or 700 inhabitants per square mile.

== Economy ==
Poverty incidence of Cagayancillo (%)

Source: Philippine Statistics Authority

== Landmark ==
=== Cagayancillo Fort ===
Cagayancillo Fort is one of the surviving defense forts in Palawan built during the Spanish Colonial Period. Work on the fort was started in the late 16th century by Father Nicolas Melo and Father Alonso Colosa, but it was not completed till the early 18th century by Father Hipolito Casiano, spanning almost 130 years. The 162-sq. meter (1,740-sq. foot) diamond-shaped fort was built on the coast on a high point on the island and made from sea rocks mixed with lime. Like some of the other Spanish forts in this area, inside is a church surrounded by its massive 12 metres (39 ft) high and 3 metres (9.8 ft) thick walls, providing a safe place for the residents during marauding pirate attacks. The other Spanish Colonial fortifications in Palawan are Fort Santa Isabel in Taytay and Fort Cuyo in Cuyo.

== Healthcare ==
There are no hospitals in Cagayancillo. Health facilities in the municipality consist of 1 rural health unit and 4 Barangay Health Stations. In terms of health manpower, the municipality employs 1 municipal health officer, 1 public health nurse, 1 rural health midwife and 1 rural sanitary inspector. Medical interns spend 2–3 years practicing tropical medicine at Cagayancillo. This is the only time a medical doctor is in residence on the island.

== Education ==
The Cagayancillo Schools District Office governs all educational institutions within the municipality. It oversees the management and operations of all private and public, from primary to secondary schools.

It has a total of 8 public elementary schools with a total of 37 classrooms. A total of 35 teachers are available in school year 2000–2001 for total enrollees of 1,110. This provides an average classroom - pupil ratio and teacher - pupil ratio 1:39. This ratio is above the national standard of 1:50 classroom - pupil and teacher- pupil ratios. Enrollment participation rate is estimated at 85.03% for school year 2000–2001. In secondary education, the municipality has one national high school located in the Poblacion. There were 9 classrooms and 13 secondary school teachers giving an average ratio of 1:52 classroom -student ratio. Secondary school participation rate was low at 69%.

=== Primary and elementary schools ===
- Cagayancillo Central School
- Calusa Elementary School
- Cawili Elementary School
- Magsaysay Elementary School
- Mampio Elementary School
- Nusa Elementary School
- Sta. Cruz Elementary School
- Talaga Elementary School

=== Secondary school ===
- Cagayancillo National High School

== See also ==
- List of islands of the Philippines
