= Fort Cuyo =

Citadel in Palawan, Philippines

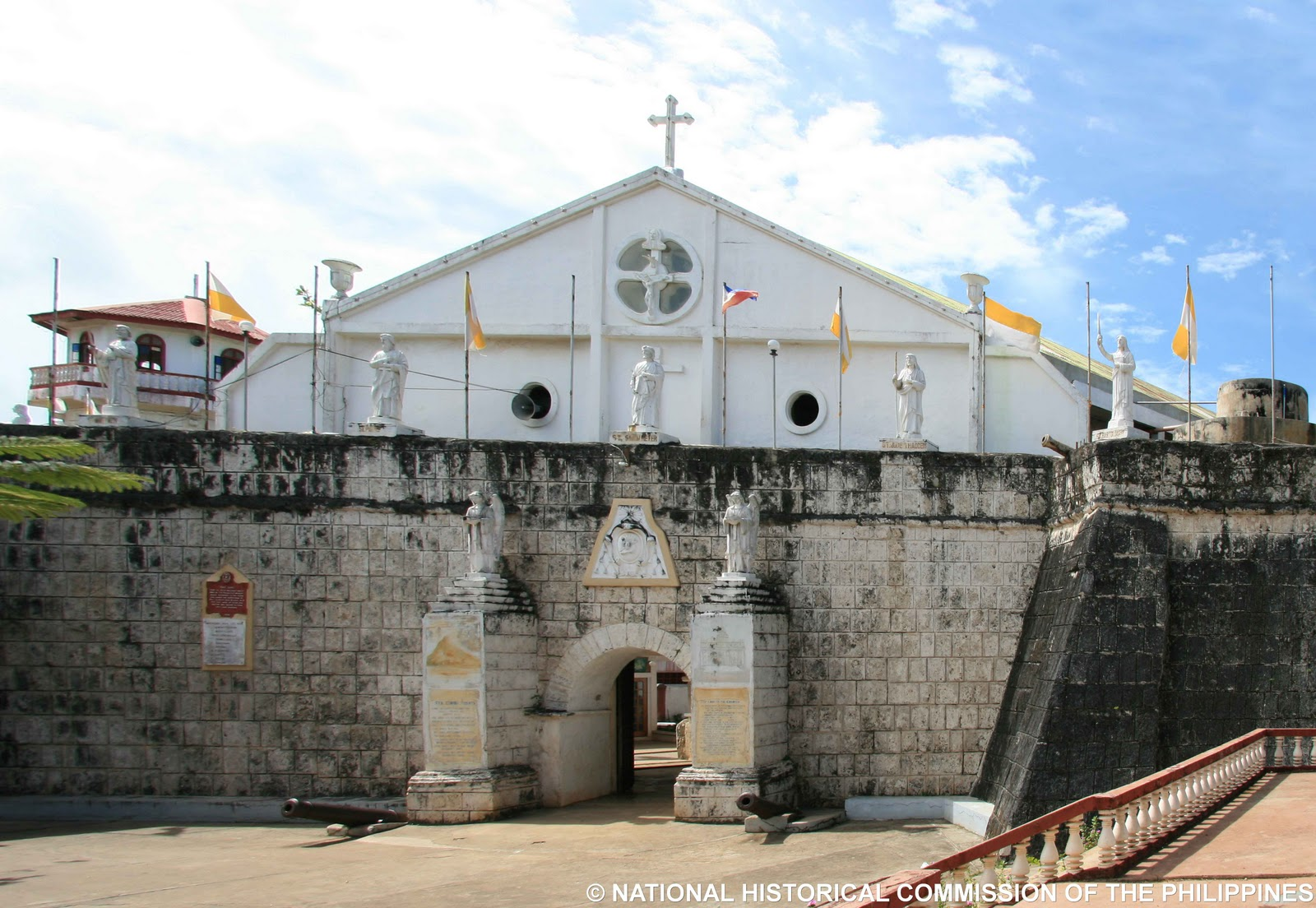
- Fort's facade

General information
- Location: Cuyo, Palawan, Philippines
- Coordinates: 10°51′19.76″N 121°0′29.20″E
- Completed: 1680

Height
- Height: 10 meters

Technical details
- Grounds: 1 hectare

Design and construction
- Designations: National Historical Landmark

Fort Cuyo is a citadel built in 1680 during the Spanish-era in the Philippines. It was constructed to protect the locals from Muslim invaders and other threats.

== History ==
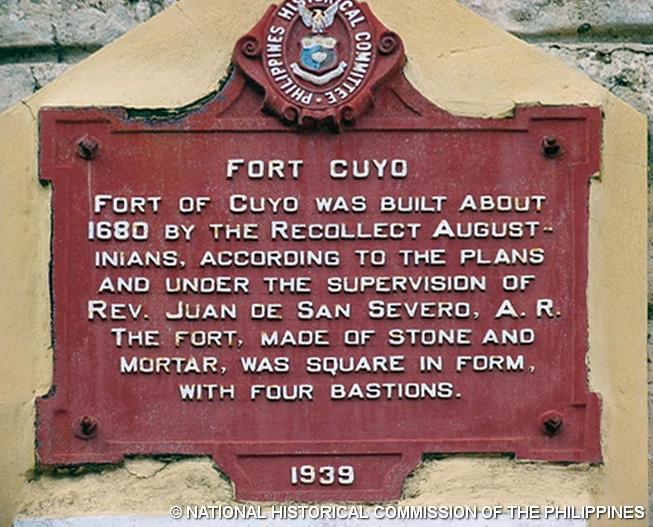
National Historical Commission of the Philippines historical marker

In 1636, Muslim raiders looted Cuyo. To protect the locals from future raids, the Recollect Augustinians built the fort in 1680 .

Originally, Fort Cuyo was made from stone and mortar, and square-shaped with four bastions. The fort has an area of one hectare. Its wall is 10 meters high and 2 meters thick, and has a tall belfry and watchtowers.

=== Present use ===
Built in 1622, Saint Augustine Church, is situated inside the fort complex. It is considered as the oldest church in Palawan. In addition to the church, a convent and a chapel are within the fort's walls.

== Recognition ==
The National Historical Commission of the Philippines declared the fort as a historical landmark in 1939.

== Notable people ==
In 1899, Trinidad Legarda was born inside Fort Cuyo. Her parents temporarily took refuge to escape the looting in Cuyo by bandits, led by Kausapin. In the Philippines, Legarda was the first female to become an ambassador of the country when she took office in Vietnam in 1958.
