= Cagayan (disambiguation) =

Cagayan is a province in the Philippines.

Cagayan may also refer to the following:

== Places in the Philippines ==
=== Luzon ===
- Cagayan Valley, an administrative region in the Philippines including the Cagayan province
  - Cagayan River
  - Cagayan Special Economic Zone

=== Mindanao ===
- Cagayan de Oro, a city
  - Cagayan River (Mindanao)
  - Metro Cagayan de Oro

== Other uses ==
- Survivor: Cagayan, a 2013 American reality TV show

== See also ==
- Gaddang (disambiguation)
- Cagayancillo, a municipality in Palawan province, Philippines
- Mapun, a municipality in the province of Tawi-Tawi, Philippines, formerly known as Cagayan de Sulu and Cagayan de Tawi-Tawi
