= Cuyo, Palawan =

Municipality in Palawan, Philippines

Cuyo
- Municipality
- Municipality of Cuyo
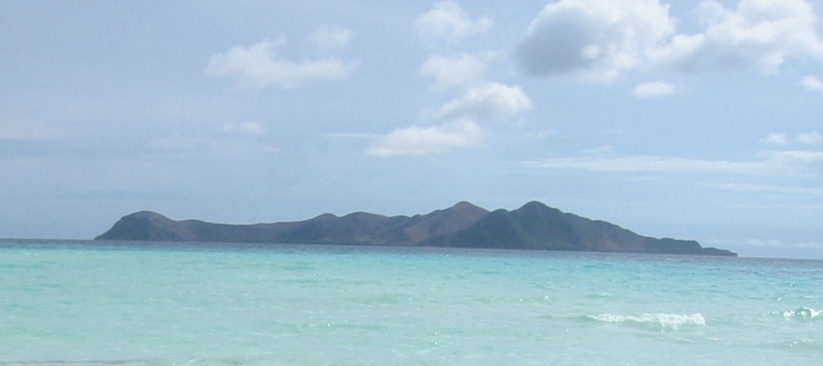
- Manamoc Island Saint Augustine Church in Fort Cuyo Capusan Beach

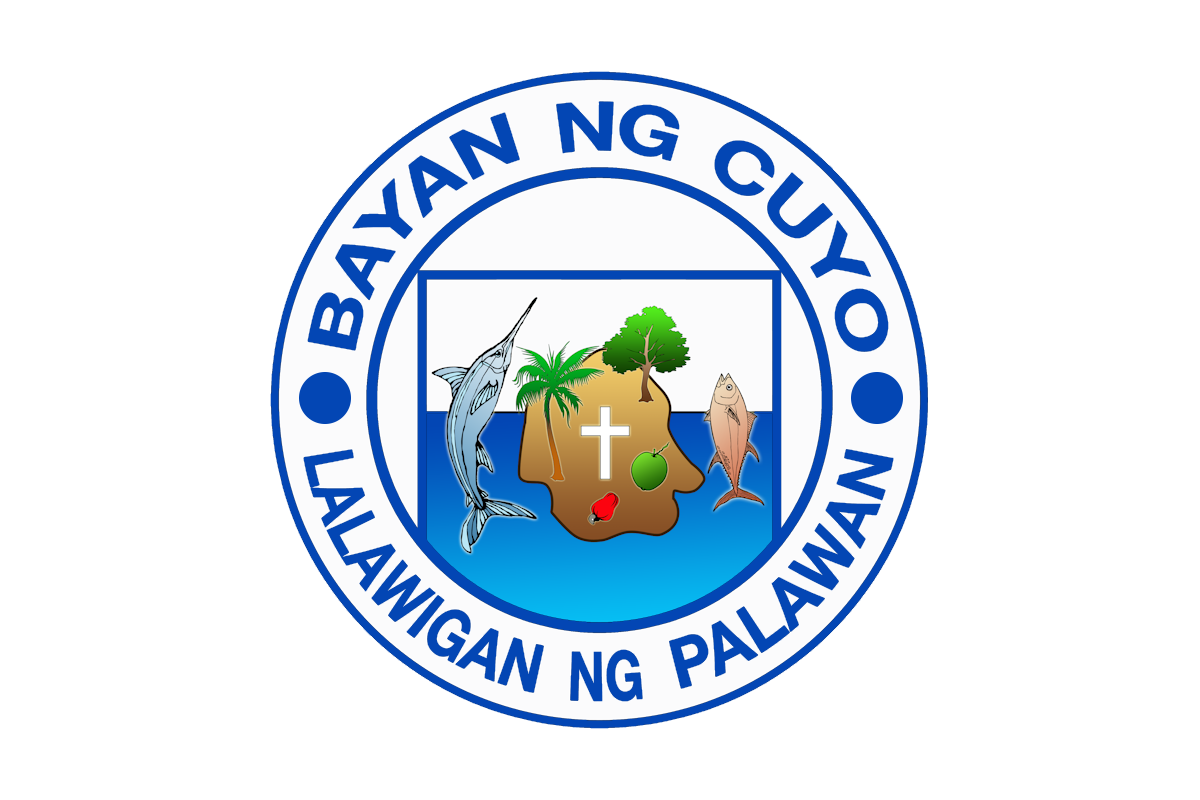
- Flag Seal

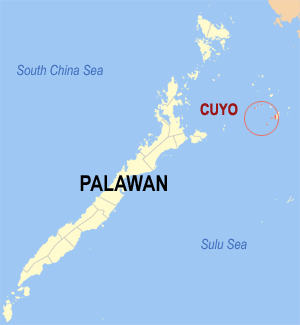
- Map of Palawan with Cuyo highlighted
- Interactive map of Cuyo
- Location within the Philippines
- Coordinates: 10°51′N 121°01′E
- Country: Philippines
- Region: Mimaropa
- Province: Palawan
- District: 1st district
- Barangays: 17 (see Barangays)

Government
  - Type: Sangguniang Bayan
  - Mayor: Andrew L. Ong
  - Vice Mayor: Edwin G. Timbancaya
  - Representative: Rosalie A. Salvame
  - Municipal Council: Members: Ronald P. Sabuya; Edwin G. Timbancaya; Ronaldo C. Caabay Jr.; Edwin A. dela Torre; Michael S. Cervancia; Edna C. Tomines; Raymundo M. Fernandez Jr.; Pablito M. Cervancia
  - Electorate: 14,512 voters (2025)

Area
  - Total: 84.95 km^{2} (32.80 sq mi)
- Elevation: 18 m (59 ft)
- Highest elevation (Mount Aguado): 186 m (610 ft)
- Lowest elevation: −3 m (−9.8 ft)

Population (2024 census)
  - Total: 24,702
  - Density: 290.8/km^{2} (753.1/sq mi)
  - Households: 5,482

Economy
  - Income class: 3rd municipal income class
  - Poverty incidence: 15.85% (2023)
  - Revenue: ₱ 167.7 million (2024)
  - Assets: ₱ 512.7 million (2024)
  - Expenditure: ₱ 148.2 million (2024)
  - Liabilities: ₱ 199 million (2024)

Service provider
  - Electricity: Palawan Electric Cooperative (PALECO)
- Time zone: UTC+8 (PST)
- ZIP code: 5318
- PSGC: 1705310000
- IDD : area code: +63 (0)48
- Native languages: Cuyonon; Palawano; Tagalog
- Website: www.cuyopalawan.gov.ph

Cuyo, officially the Municipality of Cuyo (Cuyonon: Banwa 'ang Cuyo, Tagalog: Bayan ng Cuyo), is a municipality in the province of Palawan, Philippines. According to the 2024 census, it has a population of 24,702 people.

Its territory includes the western half of Cuyo Island, as well as Bisucay, Caponayan, Cauayan, Imalaguan, Lubid, Manamoc, Pamalican, Pandan, Round, and Quiminatin islands, all part of the Cuyo Archipelago.

Cuyo is the oldest town in Palawan which has a culture of its own and was preserved for more than 350 years. During the Spanish colonization of the Philippines, Cuyo became the second capital of Palawan after Puerto Princesa from 1873 to 1903.

From the sea, the first visible landmark of Cuyo Island is a lighthouse located near the pier. Many of the streets leading into the town have been paved, while the layout of the poblacion retains the traditional Hispanic *plaza-iglesia* pattern. Dominating the town center is Cuyo’s church complex, which includes the church, convent, and fort built by the Spanish and completed in 1680. Nearby are a school building and a monument dedicated to national hero Jose Rizal.

The municipality is served by Cuyo Airport in the neighboring municipality of Magsaysay. The town and its cultural and natural environs are being considered to be nominated in the tentative list for UNESCO World Heritage Site declaration in the future.

== History ==
=== Pre-colonial era ===
Oriental traders were early discoverers of the Cuyo group of islands and introduced barter trading with the locals.

Later, the Malay chief Matuod and his people arrived in big boats called sakayan and formed settlements on Cuyo. The Islamic chieftain Datu Magbanua later also settled on Cuyo, later consolidating his power so that chieftains from other islands recognized his rule. Other Cuyunon chieftains in nearby islands include Datu Cabaylo of Taytay, Datu Macanas of Busuanga and Datu Cabangon whose domain stretched South of Taytay towards Puerto Princesa. The Malays brought with them their dances, and when blended with native dance, the "Soriano", it became known as the "pondo-pondo" one of the most popular folk dances even up to the present.

During the rule of Datu Magbanua, three Chinese arrived on the island and settled also on Cuyo. The Chinese discovered gold deposits in Mount Aguado and introduced gold mining, smith working, pottery, and other handicrafts. The natives of Cuyo became suspicious of their presence and later expelled them. They sailed to Ilongilong (today known as Iloilo) and formed another settlement called Parián.

=== Spanish era ===
The Spaniards first discovered Cuyo in 1571 under the time of Miguel López de Legazpi. The encomienda system was then established in the island in 1580.

The door of Cuyo Fort, now serving as the main entrance of Saint Augustine Church

In 1622, the Conde de San Agustín, together with five Spanish missionaries, began formal missionary works in Cuyo to convert people to Christianity. The friendly character of the people proved to be a blessing to the Spaniards, who found it easy converting the native population to Catholicism. They immediately baptised some 500 inhabitants, however, many still regarded their indigenous Cuyonon religion as sacred and continued to perform Cuyonon rituals. The forest deity of the Cuyunon people was Diwata ang Kagueban (literally goddess of the forest), who was honored in a celebrated feast, periodically held atop of Mount Caimamis in Cuyo Island, and Neguno, the ancient god of the sea of earlier Cuyonons who was responsible for turning a greedy man into the first shark. When most of the natives were converted to Christianity during the Spanish Era, about 2/3 of the converted Cuyunon were still celebrating her feast, angering the Spanish imperialists. The situation led the Spanish authorities to intensify their evangelization and governance efforts, which included the forced Roman Catholic conversion of the Cuyonon people, burning of houses of non-Catholic Cuyonons, and massive slavery. Later, the Spanish called Diwata ng Kagubatan as Virgen Del Monte, in another bid to rebrand the deity as 'Catholic'. Prior to the institution of the Provincia de Calamianes, Cuyo was directly administered as part of the Island of Panay, while Coron islands were administered by the Spanish authorities of Mindoro.

In 1636, a powerful fleet under the Muslim Datu Tagul raided Cuyo and other places in Palawan. In Cuyo, the Muslims attacked the church and clergy house. They set the town on fire and took with them prisoners including a priest, Fr. Francisco de Jesús María. They then sailed to Agutaya and Culion, where they pillaged and attacked defenceless civilians. The raiders abducted another priest from Culion, Fr. Alonzo de San Agustín, as he was saying Mass. A Spanish naval flotilla of six vessels and 250 men under Captain Nicolas Gonzáles met the returning pirates with their loot and booty on December 21, 1636. Datu Tagul was killed, 300 of his men captured, and 120 prisoners were freed. The two captured priests were killed.

To defend from further encroaches of Moro pirates in Cuyo, Recollect and Augustinian missionaries built the Cuyo Church and Fort in 1680. In 1827, one of its bastions were demolished and in its place a bell tower was erected.

In 1863, the first municipal schools were organized in Cuyo.

=== American era ===
During the American era, Cuyo was occupied in 1900 by American forces. Its first military governor was Captain Philips. In 1904, the island faced the worst fire disaster in its history. Cuyo would then encounter several epidemics from various diseases like cholera in 1908 and the Spanish flu in 1918.

=== World War II ===
On 19 May 1942, the Imperial Japanese Army occupied Cuyo. However, resistance continued in the interior until October of the same year. On 6 January 1945, the US Air Corps arrived in Cuyo and liberated the island from the Japanese. Then then built an air strip around Balaguem.

=== Modern era ===
On 2 November 1949, a strong typhoon passed Cuyo, destroying 2,000 houses and displacing 5,000 people as well as 1,000 mango trees.

On 26 October 1952, another typhoon passed, destroying five sailboats and 3,500 cavans of palay.

In 1957, the following sitios were converted to barrios: Emilod and Balading. In 1964, the barrios of Balaguen, Canipo, Cocoro, Danawan, Igabas, Imilod, Los Angeles, Lucbuan, Patonga, Rizal, Siparay Island, and Tagawayan Island were separated from Cuyo to constitute the new and separate municipality of Magsaysay.

== Geography ==
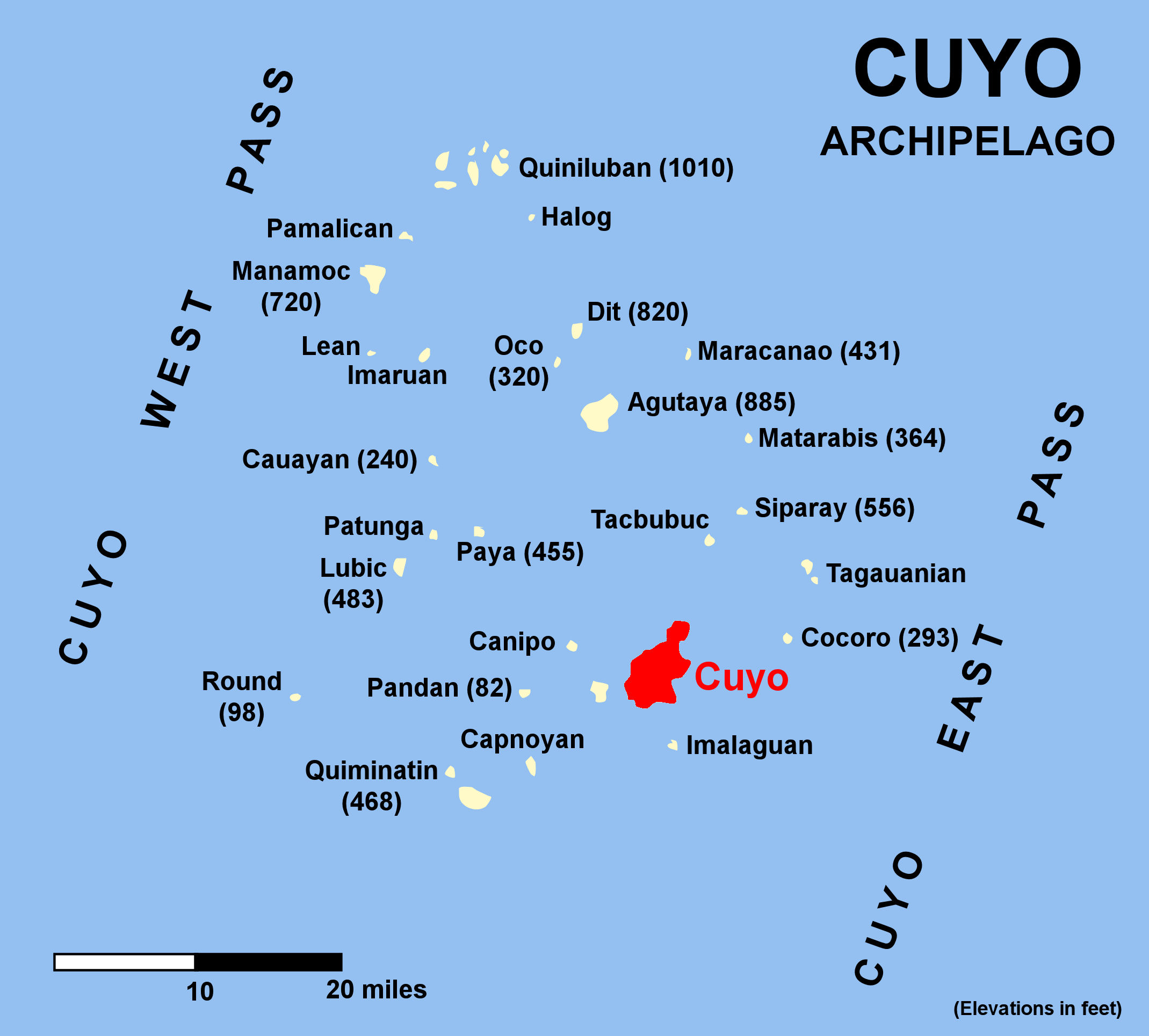
Cuyo Archipelago, with elevations (in feet).

Cuyo Island is the largest island of the Cuyo Archipelago, about 13 kilometers (8.1 mi) long, 7.5 kilometers (4.7 mi) wide, and with an area of 57 square kilometers (22 sq mi). Mount Bonbon with an elevation of 817 feet (249 m) is the highest mountain in Cuyo island. The Island is under the jurisdiction of the municipalities of Cuyo and Magsaysay. The poblacion of Cuyo is home to a Spanish fort, which shelters a church and a convent in its high stone walls.

=== Barangays ===
Cuyo is politically subdivided into 17 barangays. Each barangay consists of puroks and some have sitios.

In 1956, sitio Danawan was elevated into a barrio.

- Balading
- Bancal (Poblacion)
- Cabigsing (Poblacion)
- Caburian
- Caponayan
- Catadman (Poblacion)
- Funda
- Lagaoriao (Poblacion)
- Lubid
- Manamoc
- Maringian
- Lungsod (Poblacion)
- Pawa
- San Carlos
- Suba
- Tenga-tenga (Poblacion)
- Tocadan (Poblacion)

=== Climate ===
Climate data for Cuyo, Palawan (1991–2020, extremes 1905–2023)
Month	Jan	Feb	Mar	Apr	May	Jun	Jul	Aug	Sep	Oct	Nov	Dec	Year
Record high °C (°F)	33.6 (92.5)	33.6 (92.5)	35.4 (95.7)	38.4 (101.1)	37.2 (99.0)	35.6 (96.1)	35.0 (95.0)	35.0 (95.0)	35.0 (95.0)	34.8 (94.6)	34.6 (94.3)	33.8 (92.8)	38.4 (101.1)
Mean daily maximum °C (°F)	30.6 (87.1)	31.0 (87.8)	31.9 (89.4)	33.1 (91.6)	32.9 (91.2)	31.9 (89.4)	31.4 (88.5)	31.4 (88.5)	31.5 (88.7)	31.7 (89.1)	31.9 (89.4)	30.9 (87.6)	31.7 (89.1)
Daily mean °C (°F)	28.0 (82.4)	28.1 (82.6)	28.8 (83.8)	29.7 (85.5)	29.5 (85.1)	28.8 (83.8)	28.4 (83.1)	28.5 (83.3)	28.5 (83.3)	28.7 (83.7)	29.0 (84.2)	28.3 (82.9)	28.7 (83.7)
Mean daily minimum °C (°F)	25.3 (77.5)	25.3 (77.5)	25.7 (78.3)	26.3 (79.3)	26.2 (79.2)	25.7 (78.3)	25.5 (77.9)	25.6 (78.1)	25.6 (78.1)	25.7 (78.3)	26.1 (79.0)	25.7 (78.3)	25.7 (78.3)
Record low °C (°F)	20.1 (68.2)	19.0 (66.2)	20.4 (68.7)	19.2 (66.6)	20.0 (68.0)	21.3 (70.3)	20.0 (68.0)	21.1 (70.0)	21.3 (70.3)	21.2 (70.2)	19.4 (66.9)	19.0 (66.2)	19.0 (66.2)
Average rainfall mm (inches)	15.0 (0.59)	7.1 (0.28)	25.5 (1.00)	35.0 (1.38)	178.4 (7.02)	315.1 (12.41)	408.9 (16.10)	380.4 (14.98)	315.5 (12.42)	260.8 (10.27)	105.6 (4.16)	71.0 (2.80)	2,118.3 (83.40)
Average rainy days (≥ 1.0 mm)	3	3	3	3	11	17	21	19	19	14	6	5	124
Average relative humidity (%)	83	82	82	80	82	84	85	84	85	84	82	83	83
Source: PAGASA

== Demographics ==
Population census of Cuyo

Year	Pop.	±% p.a.
1903	12,773	—
1918	14,791	+0.98%
1939	17,492	+0.80%
1948	17,599	+0.07%
1960	20,394	+1.24%
1970	12,534	−4.75%
1975	12,839	+0.48%
1980	14,692	+2.73%

Year	Pop.	±% p.a.
1990	15,294	+0.40%
1995	16,694	+1.65%
2000	18,257	+1.94%
2007	20,040	+1.29%
2010	21,847	+3.19%
2015	22,360	+0.44%
2020	23,489	+1.04%
2024	24,702	+1.22%

Source: Philippine Statistics Authority

In the 2024 census, the population of Cuyo was 24,702 people, with a density of 290 inhabitants per square kilometer or 750 inhabitants per square mile.

== Economy ==
Poverty incidence of Cuyo (%)

Source: Philippine Statistics Authority

== Fort Cuyo ==
During the early Spanish period, Fort Cuyo was constructed in 1680 to protect the Cuyonon from sporadic Moro attacks. The original complex of stone and mortar was a square with four bastions. The present complex, which occupies 1 hectare (2.5 acres), is a solid rectangular edifice with walls 10 meters (33 ft) high and 2 meters (6 ft 7 in) thick. It has a tall belfry and watchtowers; its cannons, which face the sea, are now fired only during town celebrations. Fort Cuyo is one of the most ancient forts in the Philippines and is considered unique for its inclusion of a church, convent, and Perpetual Adoration chapel all in one building.

In 1762 one of the British ships that invaded Manila fired at the Cuyo fort but it was not damaged at all. Another fort was started at Lucbuan seven kilometres away on the east side of Cuyo island, but it was never finished. In 1873, the capital of Paragua (present day Palawan) was transferred to Cuyo from Taytay.

== Culture ==
Despite its long history Cuyo has held back the hands of time and preserved its rich cultural heritage preserved since more than 350 years.

The tipano band, a flute and drum marching band that is more similar to a corps of drums or a fife and drum corps, and the de kwerdas (string band), supply background music on important social occasions. They also accompany singers and render dance music like the pinundo-pundo. The tipano is reserved for the ati-ati, sinulog, and komedya.

Both ensembles use available instruments and instrumentalists. The tipano core is basically two drums and four to seven transverse mouth flutes with six finger-holes. One or two tipano "nga maite" (small flutes) and three or four tipano "nga mabael" (larger flutes) are played with a redublante (snare drum), bombo (single tenor or bass drum), and sometimes a pair of platilyo. The de kwerdas has two or three sabel, and occasionally a guitar, a bajo (six-stringed bass), a banjo, and a banduria, with the occasional flutes and percussion (in modern ensembles an electric guitar is also used). In Cuyonon music the "akompanimento" refers to the harmonic accompaniment-principal or "primera" to the first or highest voice, and "segunda" to the second.

The Cuyonon youth celebrate love with song during the post-harvest courting season. The Cancion, a popular serenade, is sung with the strumming of a five - or six-stringed guitar in the distinctive punctual manner. Parting is a familiar concern in Cuyunon love songs. Examples of love songs are "Napopongao Ako", "Ang Gegma", "Ploning", "Daragang Taga Cuyo", "Konsomision", "Ako Maski Bayan", "Tiis Manong Pido", "Nagpamasiar Ako", and "Komosta".

Cuyonon dances have evolved from native and Spanish influences. Among these are the Pastores (the Christmas dance of the sheppherds), the Chotis (from the German schothische), Lanceros de Cuyo (local French guadrille), Birginia (Virginia reel or square dance), Paraguanen (a romantic comic duet), and La Jota Paragua (a Castilian-type jota using bamboo castanets and manton). The island is known for the Mazurka de Cuyo, a social dance with characteristic mazurka steps. Another popular dance is the Pinundo-pundo, a stylish wedding dance marked by sudden pauses, its first two parts, featuring solo dances of the boy and the girl, are followed by the suring, a love play between the couple.

The Cuyonon have developed a distinctive performing art that combines song, dance, and drama. Known as the *Sayaw*, it is a colorful narrative performance accompanied by the music of a string band. The presentation typically features five pairs of young performers arranged in two lines, dressed in full costume and makeup, and carrying props such as flowers, crowns, and occasionally knives. After an opening dance, the lead couple narrates the story—sometimes in verse. The themes may range from everyday experiences to notable events, such as winning a sweepstakes. The narrative is then interpreted through dance, culminating in a choreographed finale.

=== Feast of St. Augustine ===
Yearly on August 28, Cuyo Island celebrates San Agustin's feast, currently dubbed as the Purongitan Festival, marked as the main celebration of Cuyo town.

On the eve of the fiesta, a cultural presentation featuring the traditional performing arts and sometimes a separate show of modern songs and dances may be presented. The feast day is begun with a morning mass (sometimes a High Mass officiated by the bishop) and followed by the Ati-ati, a legacy of the Aklanon migrants who left an impact to the town. Folk from the nearby islands board barotos (boats) to view the parade which recreates the confrontation of San Agustin and the native "savages". Participants portray the Aeta by darkening their bodies with soot and painting their faces with anyel (indigo) - this act being the name the festival is named in the Cuyo language, purongitan. They don foot-high headgear of coconut ginit fiber adorned with chicken feathers, and decorate their costumes with coconut leaves. The men, clad in loin cloths, carry spears, bows and arrows, or bolo. The women, wearing patadyong and beaded necklaces, traditionally would carry baskets with a tumpline, but not today.

For years the participants from the town form two lines, one of men and the other of women. The director signals the start of the singing by striking his cane on the ground. This is followed by a spontaneous dance characterized by sways, hops, jumps, and the jerking of weapons accompanied by chanting; the director also signals the end of the dance. The village captain and his family may recite a series of verses. The director is then approached by the last to recite, customarily the role belongs to youngest child of the barangay captain's family assigned.

As the floats of San Agustin and other saints enter the church at the end of the procession, the participants kneel, prostrate themselves, or sing while performing skipping steps before the images. The merrymaking intensifies when the alakayo, a dancing clown, chases the ladies, stopping only when coins are thrown to him on the ground. The alakayo collects the coins with his mouth.

Today the dancing Ati-Ati are composed of groups of individuals from the villages of the town, which perform to a percussion band with flutes and guitars, a specialized combined form of the tipano and de kwerdas.

Meanwhile, the panapatan performance are staged in front of various houses for a fee. These are mostly excerpts of the komedya and ati-ati known as komedya sa kalye and ati-ati sa bukid, the performers of which use simpler clothing than in the more elaborate full-length performances. Ati-ati sa bukid is sung and danced to celebrate a fruitful harvest. Today it is usually danced by young boys wearing masks or indigo-painted faces.

Another pantomime, innocentes, recreates the descent of the "savages" from the hills to pay tribute to San Agustin. They are wearing coconut fibre masks and red striped shirts. The participants frolic and fence with sticks.

Komedya or moro-moro performances are larger (with some 50 actors) and more refined than the ati-ati. The clash between the Muslims and the Christians is further dramatized by background music; commonly used tunes are the pasadoble, marchas, giyera, and kasal.

The same subject is portrayed by the sinulog. The Christians are identified by their black costumes, kampilan, and elongated shields; the Muslims by their red turbans and waistbands, and round shields. The participants may wear masks or paint their faces. Both groups, usually of six dancers each, sometimes perform to the beating of tin cans. Alternate steps of offense and defense, e.g., advancing and retreating, with corresponding movements of weapons, are followed by circular formations simulating scenes of strategy plotting.

=== Aguado pilgrimage ===
Mt. Aguado features life-size Stations of the Cross constructed from the foot to the peak of the mountain. Cuyonon devotees, visitors and tourists make the annual pilgrimage to Mt. Aguado as part of the penitential rites done in Cuyo during the Holy Week particularly on Holy Thursday.

== Education ==
The Cuyo Schools District Office governs all educational institutions within the municipality. It oversees the management and operations of all private and public, from primary to secondary schools.

=== Primary and elementary Schools ===
- Balading Elementary School
- Bisucay Elementary School
- Caponayan Elementary School
- Cuyo Central School
- Cuyo Learning Adademe
- Cuyo Miller School
- Funda Elementary School
- Lubid Elementary School
- Manamoc Elementary School
- Maringian Elementary School
- Paaralan ng Buhay ng Antipolo
- Pamitinan Elementary School
- Pawa Elementary School
- Saint Joseph Academy
- San Carlos Elementary School
- Suba Elementary School

=== Secondary schools ===
- Cuyo National High School
- Gaudencio E. Abordo Memorial National High School-Bisucay Annex
- Manamoc National High School
- Pawa National High School
- Saint Joseph Academy
- San Carlos National High School
- Suba National High School

=== Higher educational institution ===
- Palawan State University

== Notable personalities ==
- Manuel Rey — member of the Philippine Assembly from 1907 to 1909

Judge Jose P Rodriguez(Judge of first instance Palawan) USAFFE officer, GSIS board of director member in the 60s, Former Law school Classmate and Friend of Former President Ferdinand Marcos.

Trinidad Fernandez -Legarda, First woman ambassador of the Philippines, Carnival Queen in earlier years.

== See also ==
- List of islands of the Philippines
