= Rosalie Salvame =

Filipino politician

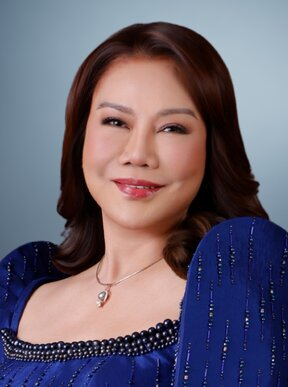
- Official portrait, 2025

Member of the House of Representatives from Palawan's 1st congressional district
- Incumbent
- Assumed office June 30, 2025
- Preceded by: Edgardo L. Salvame

Personal details
- Born: December 10, 1963 (age 62)
- Party: NUP (2026–present)
- Other political affiliations: PRP (2024–2026)
- Spouse: Edgardo Salvame

Rosalie "Rose" Ang Salvame (born December 10, 1963) is a Filipino politician who is a member of the Palawan's 1st congressional district. She succeeded her husband Edgardo L. Salvame. Following her husband's death, she decided to run stating she wanted to "continue what [her husband] started in our town."

She is the chairperson of the Subcommittee on Women and Girl Children's Rights.

== See also ==
- List of female members of the House of Representatives of the Philippines
- 20th Congress of the Philippines
