= Tablas, Romblon =

Tablas Bayan ng Tablas
- Municipality
- Interactive map of Tablas
- Coordinates: 12°24′19″N 122°3′51″E
- Established: 8 June 1940
- Founder: Leonardo Festin y Fabon
- Seat: Odiongan

Government
  - Mayor: Nestor Fabon, Vicente Osorio, Pablo Baculinao

The special Municipality of Tablas was a municipality within the Province of Romblon in the Philippines from 1940 to 1946. It encompassed the entire island of Tablas with Odiongan, the largest town in the island, as its seat.

== History ==
The special municipality of Tablas was created, together with the special municipalities of Maghali, Romblon, and Sibuyan, by the virtue of Commonwealth Act No. 581 and was enacted without executive approval creating special municipalities in the province on 8 June 1940. A year after World War II, with the help of Representative Modesto Formilleza, Republic Act No. 38 abolished the special municipalities. After the restoration, there were only four municipalities in Tablas. Namely, Despujols, Odiongan (from which Ferrol would break away in 1978), San Agustin (from which Calatrava would break away in 1968 and Santa Maria in 1982), Looc (From which Alcantara would break away in 1961), and the Act's newly created municipality of Santa Fe from which San Jose would later separate in 1963 to a total of ten municipalities encompassing the island of Tablas and the island of Carabao.
