= Romblon Provincial Board =

Legislative body of the province of Romblon, Philippines

Romblon Provincial Board Sangguniang Panlalawigan ng Romblon Kasapulan Puodanon sang Romblon
- 10th Romblon Provincial Board

Type
- Type: Unicameral
- Term limits: 3 terms (9 years)

Leadership
- Presiding Officer: Arming Gutierrez, PFP

Structure
- Seats: 14 board members 1 ex officio presiding officer
- Political groups: Nacionalista (3) PFP (4) LP (1) Vacant (0)
- Length of term: 3 years
- Authority: Local Government Code of the Philippines

Elections
- Voting system: Multiple non-transferable vote (regular members); Indirect election (ex officio members); Acclamation (sectoral member)
- Last election: May 9, 2025
- Next election: May 9, 2028

Meeting place
- Romblon Provincial Capitol; Romblon, Romblon

Website
- www.romblonprov.gov.ph

The Romblon Provincial Board is the Sangguniang Panlalawigan (provincial legislature) of the Philippine province of Romblon.

The members are elected via plurality-at-large voting: the province is divided into two districts, one sending one member and the other sending seven members to the provincial board; the electorate votes the number of seats allocated for their district, with the candidates with the highest number of votes (first in the first district and the first seven in the second) being elected. The vice governor is the ex officio presiding officer, and only votes to break ties. The vice governor is elected via the plurality voting system throughout the province.

== District apportionment ==
Elections	No. of seats per district		Ex officio seats	Total seats
Elections	1st	2nd	Ex officio seats	Total seats
2004–present	4	4	3	11

- 1st District: Banton, Concepcion, Corcuera, San Fernando, Magdiwang, Cajidiocan, Romblon and San Agustin.
- 2nd District: Alcantara, Ferrol, Looc, Odiongan, San Andres, San Jose, Calatrava, Santa Fe, and Santa Maria.

== List of members ==
=== Vice Governor ===
Election year	Name	Party
2004	Samuel Romero	Lakas
2007	Alicia Fetalvero	KAMPI
2010	Manuel Madrid	NPC
2013	Jose Riano	Liberal
2016	Jose Riano	Liberal
2019	Felix Ylagan y Fondevilla	Lakas
2022	Armando "Arming" Gutierrez	PDP–Laban
2025	Armando "Arming" Gutierrez	PFP

=== 1st district ===
- Population (2024):

Election year	Member (party)	Member (party)	Member (party)	Member (party)
2004	Francisco Solis (Lakas)	Giovanni Fondevilla (Lakas)	Gil Moreno (Lakas)	Jorge Ramos (Lakas)
2007	Nelson Lim (Lakas)	Jorge Ramos (Lakas)	Gil Moreno (Lakas)	Patrocino Manalon (KAMPI)
2010	Nelson Lim (Lakas-Kampi)	Abner Perez (NPC)	Gil Moreno (Lakas-Kampi)	Samuel Romero (Nacionalista)
2013	Anthony Rugas (Liberal)	Abner Perez (Liberal)	Samuel Romero (Nacionalista)	Nelson Lim (Nacionalista)
2016	Narciso Bernardo, Jr. (Liberal)	Abner Perez (Liberal)	Samuel Romero (Nacionalista)	Armando Gutierrez (Nacionalista)
2019	Narciso Bernardo, Jr. (Nacionalista)	Nene Solis (Nacionalista)	Rachel Bañares (Nacionalista)	Herminio Mortel (Nacionalista)
2022	Narciso Bernardo, Jr. (PDP–Laban)	Maria Rhosarean Solis (Nacionalista)	Rachel Bañares (Nacionalista)	Herminio Mortel (PDP–Laban)
2025	Aaron Riano (PFP)	Maria Rhosarean Solis (Nacionalista)	Cary Falculan (Liberal)	Herminio Mortel (PFP)

=== 2nd district ===
- Population (2024):

Election year	Member (party)	Member (party)	Member (party)	Member (party)
2004	Alicia Fetalvero (Lakas)	Fred Dorado (Lakas)	Benjamin Irao (Liberal)	Andrew Fondevilla (Lakas)
2007	Geminiano Galicia (Lakas)	Fred Dorado (Lakas)	Benjamin Irao (KAMPI)	Manuel Madrid (KAMPI)
2010	Felix Ylagan (NPC)	Fred Dorado (Lakas-Kampi)	Venizar Maravilla (Liberal)	Jim Fondevilla (NPC)
2013	Felix Ylagan (Liberal)	Juliet Fiel (Liberal)	Andrew Fondevilla (Nacionalista)	Venizar Maravilla (Nacionalista)
2016	Felix Ylagan (Liberal)	Fred Dorado (Nacionalista)	Andrew Fondevilla (Liberal)	Venizar Maravilla (Nacionalista)
2019	Robert Maulion (Nacionalista)	Fred Dorado (Nacionalista)	Jose Madrid (Liberal)	Rubelyn S. Solis (Liberal)
2022	Natalio F. Beltran, III (Nacionalista)	Fred Dorado (Nacionalista)	Venizar "Boy" Maravilla (Nacionalista)	Rubelyn S. Solis (PDP–Laban)
2025	Natalio F. Beltran, III (Nacionalista)	Irene Morgado (PFP)	Venizar "Boy" Maravilla (Nacionalista)	Rubelyn S. Solis (PFP)
