= Cabahan =

Island in the Philippines

Cabahan Island
Native name: Puro Island
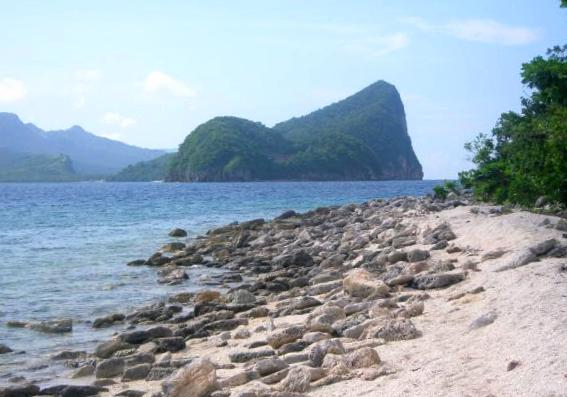

- Location within Philippines

Geography
- Location: Guinbirayan Bay
- Coordinates: 12°8′39″N 122°2′22″E
- Archipelago: Romblon Group of Islands
- Adjacent to: Sibuyan Sea
- Length: 2 km (1.2 mi)
- Width: 1.5 km (0.93 mi)
- Highest elevation: 85 m (279 ft)

Administration
- Philippines
- Region: Mimaropa
- Province: Romblon
- Municipality: Santa Fe
- Barangay: Guinbirayan

Cabahan (also known as Cabangahan or Puro Island) is an island in the province of Romblon in the Philippines. It has one sitio named Cabangahan, which is a part of barangay Guinbirayan, Santa Fe, Romblon. The local name of the island is Puro, which means "Island" in the Onhan language; which is the native language of the island's inhabitants.

The island was formerly an island barrio of Santa Fe, Romblon, that existed from 1901 to 1917. The 1903 census on population recorded the island as having 24 residents.

== Geography ==
Cabahan Island, lying off on the eastern shore of Santa Fe, about 3 miles (4.8 km) NNE of Cabalian Point (the southernmost tip of Tablas Island, is wooded and 279 feet (85 m) high. Its south and east shores are formed by red, rocky cliffs, and its west and north shores are bordered by mangroves. A rocky islet about ¼ mile (0.40 km) East of Cabahan is joined to it by a reef and about ¼ mile (0.40 km) south-southeast from the southeast point of Cabahan is Pez Rock, a red pinnacle 70 feet (21 m) high, between which and Cabahan, the water is deep.

== Education ==
The island has one Elementary school, V. A. Gutierrez-Montiel Memorial Elementary School, which provides basic education for the island inhabitants.

== See also ==
- List of islands of the Philippines
