= Romblon State University =

Public university in Romblon, Philippines

- Pamantasang Pampamahalaan ng Romblon (Filipino)
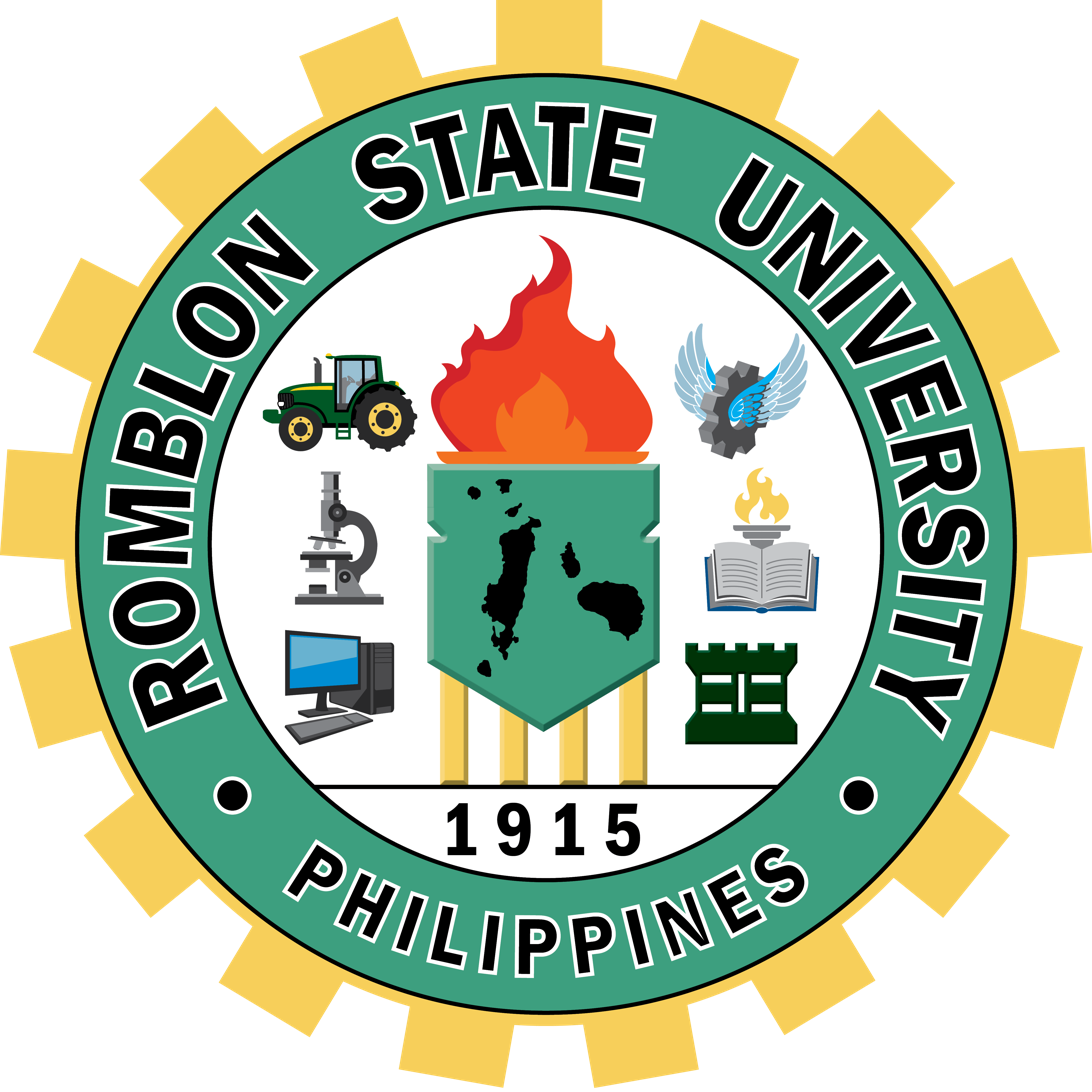
- Seal of Romblon State University
- Former names: Romblon State College; Romblon Agricultural College; Romblon National Agricultural School; Odiongan National Agricultural School; Odiongan High School; Odiongan Rural High School; Odiongan Farm School; Dr. Merian P. Catajay- Mani (University President); Dr. Emelyn F. Montoya (VP for Academic Affairs); Dr. Tomas T. Faminial (VP for Administration and Finance); Dr. Eddie G. Fetalvero (VP for Research, Extension, and Development); Dr. John F. Rufon (Chief, Presidential Management Unit and Board Secretary V)
- Location: Odiongan, Romblon, Philippines; 12°23′47″N 121°59′17″E
- Campus: List; Main: Odiongan, Romblon; Satellite: Romblon; Cajidiocan, Romblon; SanFernando, Romblon; SanAndres, Romblon; San Agustin, Romblon; Calatrava, Romblon; Santa Fe, Romblon; Santa Maria, Romblon
- Medium of instruction: Filipino, English
- Colors
- Nickname: RSUvian
- Website: rsu.edu.ph
- Location in Luzon Location in the Philippines

Romblon State University is a public higher education institution in Romblon, Philippines. It has eight satellite campuses and its main campus is located in Odiongan, Romblon.

== History ==
1914: Tracing its roots back in November 1914, during the district athletic meet in Odiongan, the Odiongan Farm School started when John C. Early, then head teacher of Romblon Sub Province suggested to teachers the idea of the establishment of a farm school in the locality to educate farmers in better farming methods.

1915-1916: The Odiongan Farm School came into being in June 1915, with sixty-five pupils enrolled in the fifth grade and forty-eight pupils in the sixth grade. Juan Fetalino, the most promising teacher in the province, took charge of the school as a principal, and was assisted by Felipa Festin, another teacher of long experience in June 1916. A complete farming course for boys, and housekeeping and house course for girls were opened, with an averaged enrollment of forty pupils for each grade.

1922-1930:In June 1922, a first year class was started and in June 1927 a second year class was added. The third and fourth year classes were organized in 1929 and in 1930, respectively. The name became Odiongan Rural High School intermediate classes were turned over to the Odiongan Elementary School. The realization of the establishment of the Odiongan Farm School has been largely due to the generosity and enthusiasm of the Odiongan people and through the earnest efforts of John C. Early.

1947: In 1947, the Odiongan Rural High School was changed to Odiongan High School that offered a General Type A Curriculum. The demand for change continued to lurk the educational planners of the province.

1958:The Odiongan High School was again converted to Odiongan National Agricultural School by virtue of Republic Act No. 1381 and the status remained for some time until the name was changed to Romblon National Agricultural School under General Appropriation Act in 1958.

1965:On July 1, 1965, then Congressman Jose D. Moreno of the defunct Congress of the Philippines authored Republic Act No. 4286 converting Romblon National Agricultural School to Romblon National Agricultural College. In the same Appropriations Act, the name Romblon National Agricultural College was shorted to Romblon Agricultural College, however collegiate course were not offered immediately after its conversion due to lack of funds.

1974:In 1974 a two-year Associate in Agricultural Technology (AAT) program was introduced in compliance with Memorandum Circular No.8.s 1974 The program had an initial enrollment of twenty-five student (15 male and 10 female).

1975:In 1975, three degree courses were offered namely: Bachelor of Science in Agriculture, Bachelor of Science in Agricultural Education, and Bachelor of Science in Home Technology, thus giving more challenges to the college, bringing about positive changes in the life of the people of Romblon. The demand for the higher educational technologies and the quest for relevant education to national development goals are imperative alternatives that could not be ignored by the college authorities.

1978:As early as 1978, the plan to convert the Romblon Agricultural College into State College was initiated. The superintendent of the College sought the assistance of the Sangguniang Panlalawigan for endorsement of the Interim Batasan Pambansa. Under the able leadership of Honorable Nemesio V. Ganan, Jr. Assemblyman for Region IV at the same time representing Romblon. He authored Parliamentary Bill 131, an act converting Romblon Agricultural College into Romblon State College and appropriating funds thereof.

1983:The Bill was signed into Law on May 18, 1983 by the late President Ferdinand E. Marcos and became Batas Pambasa Blg. 393.

1998:With the eagerness to have a University in the Province of Romblon, on September 2, 1998, Atty. Eleandro Jesus Fabic Madrona, Congressman, Lone District of Romblon, filed HB 3265 otherwise known as “An Act Converting the Romblon State College in the Municipality of Odiongan, Province of Romblon, into a State University, to be known as the Romblon State University, Appropriating Funds Therefor, and for other purposes.”

2001:Consequently, On January 12, 2001, the Romblon College of Fisheries and Forestry (RCFF) created under Batas Pambansa Blg.553 was integrated to Romblon State College by virtue of BOT Resolution No.3. S.2001 and renamed as RSC Tablas Branch in conformity with IGI-CSI Memorandum order No. 27, S.2001. Subsequently on February 28, 2001, Sibuyan Polytechnic College (SPC) created by virtue of BP 614 was also integrated to Romblon State College under BOT Resolution No.11, S.2001 and renamed as RSC Sibuyan Branch.

2009:October 14, 2009 marked the ultimate dream come true to the Romblomanons when then Pres.Gloria Macapagal Arroyo, an act establishing the ROMBLON STATE UNIVERSITY, signed Republic Act 9721.

== Staff ==
- President: Prof. Merian P. Catajay-Mani, Ed.D., CESE
- Vice President for Administration and Finance: Tomas T. Faminial, CPA, LPT, DBA
- Vice President for Academic Affairs: Emelyn F. Montoya, PhD
- Vice President for Research, Extension and Development: Prof. Eddie G. Fetalvero, PhD
- Vice President for Student Affairs and Services: Gianinna Elaine M. Labicane, PhD
- University and Board Secretary: John F. Rufon, LPT, DPA; and Mr. Marco P. Galus
- Dean, Graduate Education and Professional Studies: Philip R. Baldera, Ed.D.
- Dean, College of Agriculture, Forestry, and Environmental Science: Alfredo F. Fortu, Jr., PhD
- Dean, College of Arts and Sciences: Joemar F. Manzo, DPA
- Dean, College of Education: Prof. Sherwin M. Perlas, PhD
- Dean, College of Engineering and Technology: Orley G. Fadriquel
- Dean, College of Business and Accountancy: Ray Joseph Innocencio, Ph.D.
- Dean, College of Computing, Multimedia Arts, and Digital Innovation: Catherine Bhel B. Aguila, DIT
- Director, Institute of Criminal Justice Education: Poly D. Banagan, PhDCJ
- Director, Laboratory Science High School: Aljay Marc C. Patiam, PhD

== President ==
Term	President
1987- January 1999	Victorino L. Aguila
January 1999 - 2001 (OIC)	Ricardo S. Wagan, PhD
2001- 2005	Edilla G. Formilleza, PhD
2005 - December 2011	Jeter S. Sespeñe, PhD
December 2011 - 15 April 2012 (OIC)	Alice F. Foja, PhD
15 April 2012 - 15 April 2020	Arnulfo F. de Luna, PhD
15 April 2020 - incumbent	Merian Catajay-Mani, EdD

== Historical Names ==
Historical Name
Year	Name
1915	Odiongan Farm School
1929	Odiongan Rural High School
1947	Odiongan High School
1956	Odiongan National Agricultural School
1958	Romblon National Agricultural School
1962	Romblon Agricultural College
1983	Romblon State College
2009	Romblon State University

== Description ==
The Romblon State University (RSU) stays true and is on the course with its vision to be a premier higher education institution in the MIMAROPA Region. As the only government-owned tertiary education provider in the province of Romblon, RSU has established campuses in different islands to cater to the needs of Romblomanons as well as its neighboring provinces and respond to the limitations faced by its economically-challenged kasimanwa not to send their children to the main campus when they can have the same quality of education in their respective municipality.

Today, the university has nine campuses: the RSU-Odiongan Campus, the Main Campus at Odiongan, the RSU-Romblon Campus at Sawang, RSU-Tablas Campuses at San Andres, San Agustin, Sta. Maria, and Sta. Fe, RSU-Sibuyan Campuses in Cajidiocan and San Fernando.

Graduate Education and Professional Studies:

- Doctor in Philosophy in Educational Leadership and Management
- Doctor of Philosophy in Science Education
- Doctor of Criminology
- Doctor of Information Technology
- Master of Arts in Business Administration
- Master of Arts in Education (Major in English, Math, Science, Home Economics)
- Master in Educational Leadership and Management
- Master of Science in Agriculture
- Master of Arts in Public Administration
- Master of Arts in Guidance Counseling
- Master of Science in Criminology
- Master of Science in Information Technology

College of Agriculture Fisheries, and Forestry

- Bachelor in Agricultural Technology
- Bachelor of Science in Agriculture

College of Arts and Sciences

- Bachelor of Science in Biology major in Microbiology
- Bachelor of Arts in English Language
- Bachelor of Arts in Political Science
- Bachelor of Arts in Public Administration

College of Business and Accountancy

- Bachelor of Science in Accountancy
- Bachelor of Science in Business Administration
  - Major in Operations Management
  - Major in Financial Management
- Bachelor of Science in Hospitality Management

College of Education

- Bachelor in Elementary Education
- Bachelor in Secondary Education
  - Major in General Science
  - Major in English
  - Major in Mathematics
  - Major in Filipino
- Bachelor in Physical Education
- Bachelor in Technology and Livelihood Education

College of Engineering and Technology

- Bachelor of Science in Agricultural and Bio-systems Engineering
- Bachelor of Science in Civil Engineering
- Bachelor of Science in Electrical Engineering
- Bachelor of Science in Mechanical Engineering

Institute of Criminal Justice Education

- Bachelor of Science in Criminology

Institute of Information Technology

- Bachelor of Science in Information Technology
- Bachelor of Science in Multimedia Arts

Calatrava Campus

- Bachelor in Elementary Education
- Bachelor of Science in Agriculture
- Bachelor of Science in Forestry
- Bachelor of Science in Fisheries
- Bachelor of Science in Environmental Science

San Agustin Campus

- Master in Educational Management
- Bachelor of Science in Fisheries
- Bachelor of Elementary Education

Sta. Maria Campus

- Bachelor of Elementary Education
- Bachelor of Science in Fisheries

Sta. Fe Campus

- Bachelor in Elementary Education
- Bachelor in Secondary Education
- Bachelor of Science in Fisheries

San Andres Campus

- Bachelor of Elementary Education
- Bachelor of Science in Fisheries

Cajidiocan Campus

- Bachelor of Secondary Education
- Bachelor of Elementary Education
- Bachelor of Science in Information Technology
- Bachelor of Agricultural Technology (BAT)

Romblon Campus

- Bachelor of Science in Business Administration
- Bachelor of Science in Information Technology
- Bachelor of Science in Elementary Education
- Bachelor of Secondary Education

San Fernando Campus

- Master of Arts in Educational Management
- Master of Arts in Educational Major in English
- Bachelor in Elementary Education
- Bachelor in Secondary Education
- Bachelor in Technical-Vocational Teacher Education (BTTE)
  - Drafting Technology
  - Automotive Technology
  - Food & Service Management
- Bachelor of Science in Business Administration
- Bachelor of Science in Information Technology
- Bachelor of Science in Hotel & Restaurant Management
- Computer Operation and Programming (COP)
- Certificate in Industrial Technology (CIT)

== Charter ==
Romblon State College became Romblon State University upon the approval of Republic Act No. 9721 by President Gloria Macapagal Arroyo in 2009.

== Campuses and locations ==
- Romblon State University Odiongan - Main Campus
- Romblon State University Romblon - Sawang Campus
- Romblon State University in Sibuyan - Cajidiocan Campus
- Romblon State University in Sibuyan - Sibuyan Polytechnic College, San Fernando Campus
- Romblon State University in Tablas - Romblon College of Fisheries and Forestry, San Agustin Campus
- Romblon State University in Tablas - Romblon College of Fisheries and Forestry, San Andres Campus
- Romblon State University in Tablas - Santa Fe Campus
- Romblon State University in Tablas - Santa Maria Campus
