= Tablas =

Tablas may refer to:

- Tablas Island, an island in Romblon Province, Philippines
- Tablas Strait, a strait in the Philippines
- Tablas, Romblon, a municipality in the Philippines
- Tablas Airport or Tugdan Airport, an airport in Romblon Province, Philippines
- Tabla, a hand drum used in Indian classical music
- Dupuș village (Táblás in Hungarian), Ațel Commune, Sibiu County, Romania
