= Tabla (disambiguation) =

Tabla is a percussion instrument from the Indian subcontinent.

Tabla may also refer to:

- Tabla!, an English language newspaper in Singapore
- Tabla language, a language from Papua, Indonesia
- Tabla people, an ethnic group in Papua, Indonesia
- Tabla Nani, Indian actor
- Ballou Tabla (born 1999), Canadian soccer player

== See also ==
- Tablas (disambiguation)
- Tebela, an administrative centre of Humbo woreda in Wolaita Ethiopia
