= San Jose, Romblon =

Municipality in Romblon, Philippines

San Jose
- Municipality
- Municipality of San Jose
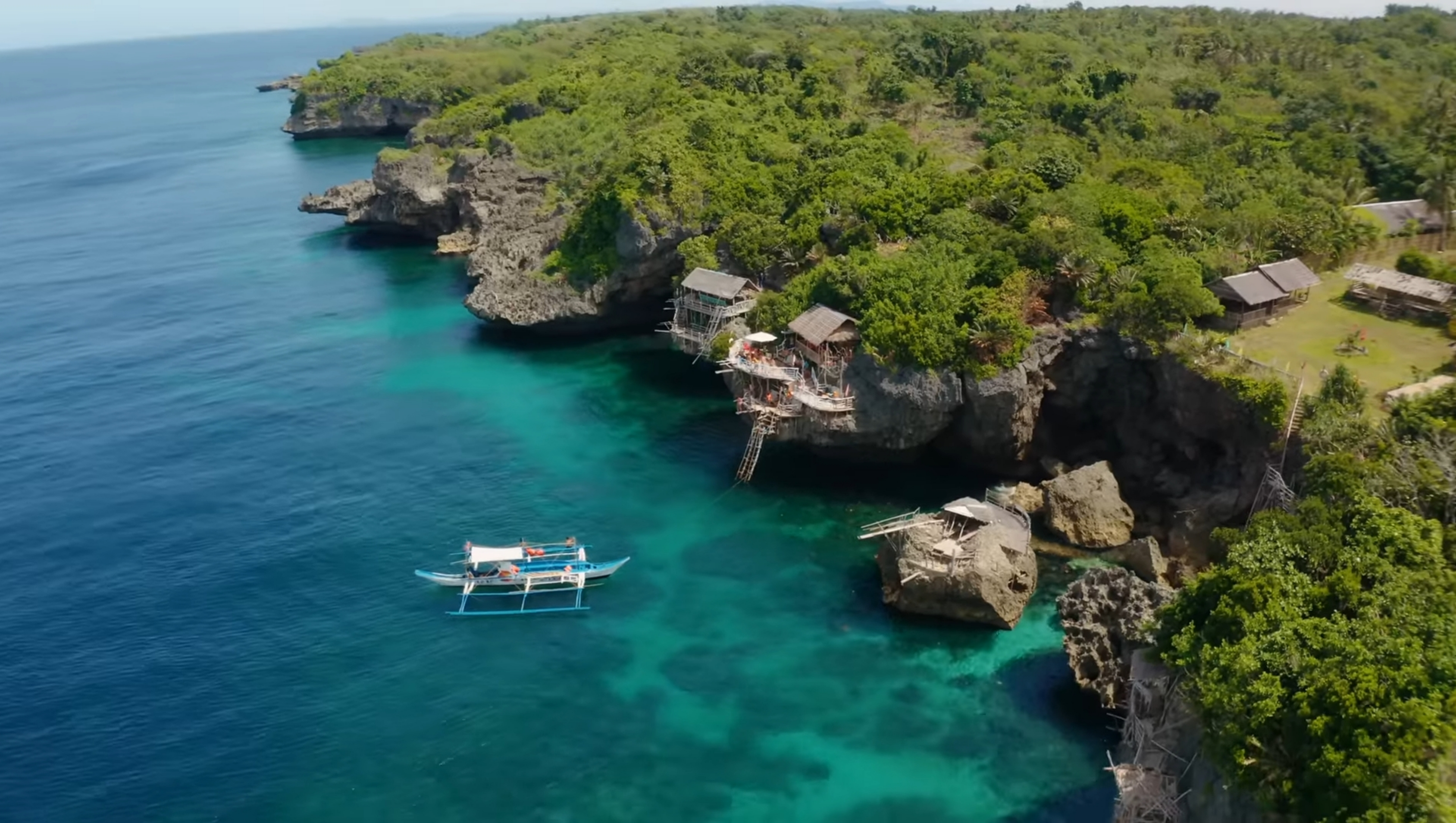

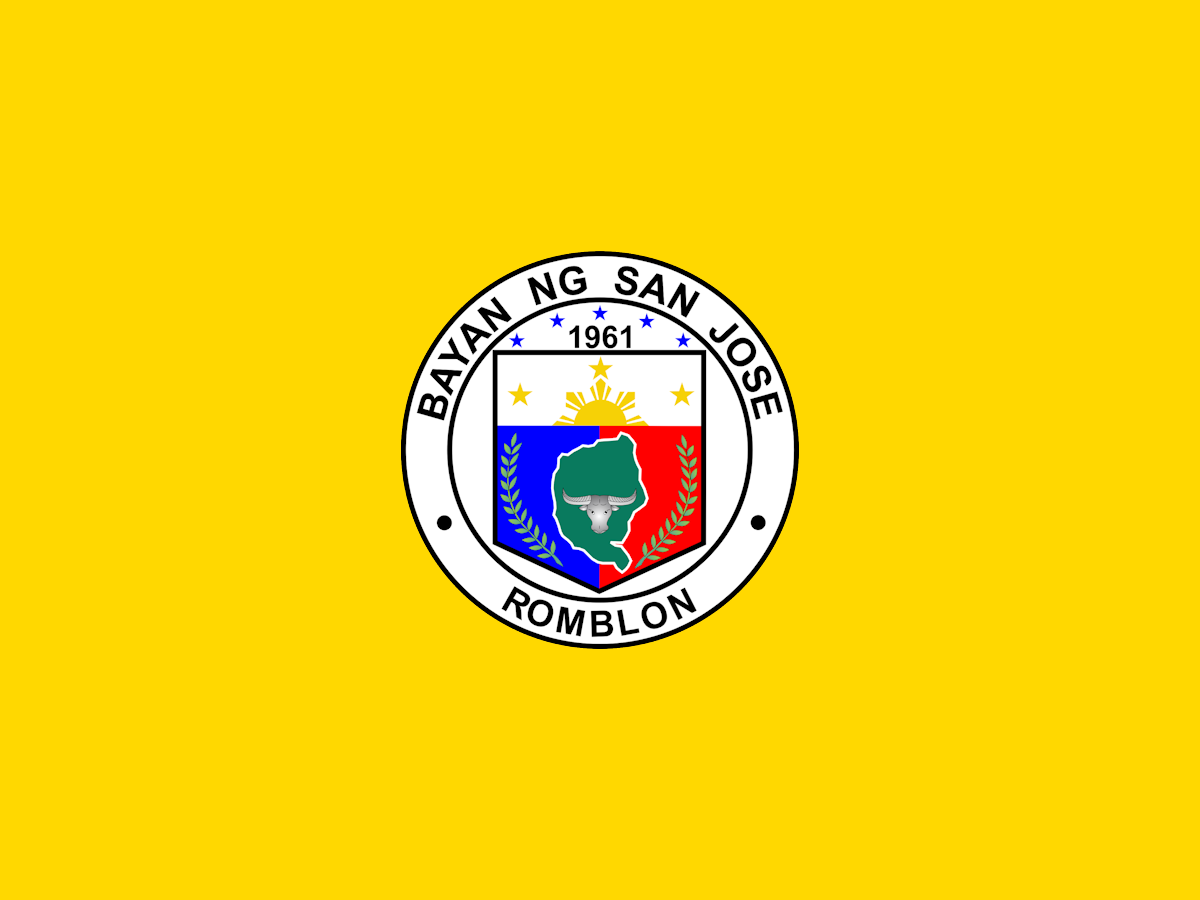
- Flag

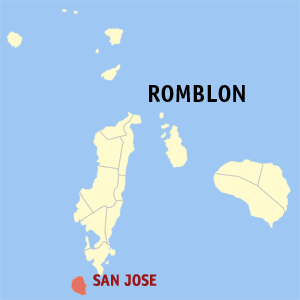
- Map of Romblon with San Jose highlighted
- Interactive map of San Jose
- Location within the Philippines
- Coordinates: 12°04′N 121°56′E
- Country: Philippines
- Region: Mimaropa
- Province: Romblon
- District: Lone district
- Founded: July 1, 1968
- Barangays: 5 (see Barangays)

Government
  - Type: Sangguniang Bayan
  - Mayor: Ronnie D. Samson
  - Vice Mayor: Egdon T. Sombilon
  - Representative: Eleandro Jesus F. Madrona
  - Councilors: Gina Villanueva; Milky Maming; Argel "Ghel" Zacarias; Ulysis Casimero; Ex Tandog; Ally Aron; Edwin Abon; Vilmo Sombilon, Jr.
  - Electorate: 7,584 voters (2025)

Area
  - Total: 22.05 km^{2} (8.51 sq mi)
- Elevation: 5.0 m (16.4 ft)
- Highest elevation: 267 m (876 ft)
- Lowest elevation: 0 m (0 ft)

Population (2020)
  - Total: 11,759
  - Density: 534/km^{2} (1,380/sq mi)
  - Households: 2,832

Economy
  - Income class: 5th municipal income class
  - Poverty incidence: 34.64% (2023)
  - Revenue: ₱ 105.8 million (2024)
  - Assets: ₱ 238 million (2024)
  - Expenditure: ₱ 99.4 million (2024)
  - Liabilities: ₱ 45 million (2024)

Service provider
  - Electricity: Tablas Island Electric Cooperative (TIELCO)
- Time zone: UTC+8 (PST)
- ZIP code: 5510
- PSGC: 1705914000
- IDD : area code: +63 (0)42
- Native languages: Onhan; Ati; Tagalog

San Jose, officially the Municipality of San Jose, is a municipality in the province of Romblon, Philippines. According to the 2024 census, it has a population of 11,626 people.

It is also known as Carabao Island, or Hambil Island, the southernmost island of the province.

Throughout much of its Spanish and American colonial history, the island repeatedly changed hands between the political jurisdictions of Romblon and Capiz provinces, before becoming a separate municipality of Romblon in 1969. The majority of the town's inhabitants speak Onhan, a Western Visayan language also spoken in some parts of Aklan in Panay Island. San Jose is located near the resort island of Boracay.

== History ==
=== Early history ===
The original settlers of the island were the Aetas, locally known as Ati or Ita who were believed to have descended from Orang Asli, the aboriginal people of the Malay Peninsula in mainland Asia. The aborigines came to the Philippines during the Paleolithic period by way of land bridges that connected the archipelago to mainland Asia. The Aetas settled in different parts of Panay Island and on the southern portion of Tablas Island, including Carabao Island where San Jose is located.

=== Spanish colonial era ===
According to Spanish explorer Miguel de Loarca's Relacion de las Islas Filipinas, Carabao Island was originally called “Hambil”. The Spanish arrived at Hambil Island in 1570, led by conquistador and explorer Martin de Goiti on orders from Miguel López de Legazpi. With an expedition composed of 27 ships, 280 Spaniards and several hundred Visayan followers, Goiti and his team conquered the chief settlement of Agcogon and explored the island. He noted that there were around 50 natives living in the settlement, who made a living from mining copper in the island.

On 2 November 1571, the islands of Romblon, including Hambil Island were organized into an encomienda and administered from the alcaldia or province of Panay by Don Alvaro de Angulo, who was appointed steward of the encomienda. In 1582, when Miguel de Loarca visited Hambil Island, he renamed the island to Isla de Carabao or Carabao Island because the island's shape resembles a water buffalo's back when seen from the horizon. In 1677, the first Spanish missionary, Fray Pedro Cubero Sebastian, arrived at Carabao Island to convert the natives to Roman Catholicism.

==== Changes in jurisdiction ====
In 1716, Capiz was created as a separate province out of the old alcaldia of Arevalo, formerly called Panay. The new province included the islands of Romblon and the valley of Aklan in north-western Panay. Carabao Island was placed under the jurisdiction of the visita of Nabas, Capiz (now part of Aklan). When Looc in Tablas Island was established as a separate pueblo or town from Banton, Romblon in 1844, the administration of Carabao Island and its two existing barrios (villages) of Agcogon and Lanas, was transferred to the new pueblo.

On 19 March 1853, the Spaniards created the Politico-Militar Commandancia del Distrito de Romblon, a new district of Capiz. It was composed of four pueblos or towns, namely Romblon, Banton, Cajidiocan and Looc, and was placed under the command of petty governor Don Ramon Vieytes. Thus, Carabao Island, which was under the jurisdiction of Looc pueblo, became part of the newly created District of Romblon.

In 1855, Romblon petty governor Don Joaquin de Prat ordered the creation of 17 new pueblos or town in Romblon, including pueblo de Cabalian (now part of Santa Fe). The order transferred the administration of Carabao Island and its two villages from Looc to Cabalian. However, pueblo de Cabalian was abolished in 1861, and following the abolition, residents of Carabao Island chose to be annexed back to Nabas, Capiz. On 11 January 1868, the District of Romblon was elevated into a province. A reorganization of the province's towns was conducted upon orders from governor Don Joaquin Corillo, which included restoration of Cabalian in 1892 into a pueblo, now renamed Santa Fe. In 1897, the residents of Carabao Island voted to rejoin Looc instead of the new pueblo of Santa Fe.

=== American invasion era ===
The Americans arrived and established civilian government in Romblon on 16 March 1901. The new colonizers decided to attach Carabao and its two barrios to Santa Fe. However, with the abolishment of Romblon province on 15 July 1907 due to insufficient income, the province, together with Carabao Island, was incorporated back to Capiz province.

Following the restoration of Romblon province on 10 March 1917, Santa Fe was once again abolished and Carabao Island was again re-annexed to Looc. Another change in Romblon's political boundaries happened on 8 June 1940, when Philippine Congress passed Commonwealth Act No. 581 sponsored by Congressman Leonardo Festin, which created the special municipality of Tablas. With the creation of the special municipality, all the previous municipalities in Tablas Island were abolished and incorporated into the new municipality.

=== Philippine independence ===
After World War II, when American civil government was restored, the special municipality of Tablas was abolished on 1 October 1946 by virtue of Republic Act No. 38 sponsored by Congressman Modesto Formelleza. Thus, the Santa Fe municipality was re-established, with Carabao Island under its administration. On 24 April 1959, two new barrios or villages, Busay and Pinamihagan, were created in Carabao Island by virtue of Republic Act No. 2144 authored by Congressman Jose D. Moreno

Carabao Island with its four villages was officially converted into a municipal district of Santa Fe on 18 June 1961 by virtue of Republic Act No. 3423, sponsored by Congressman Moreno. On 18 June 1966, the island municipal district was renamed San Jose by virtue of Republic Act No. 4289. In 1968, a new barrio, Combot, was added to the island, taken from portions of barrio Poblacion and Lanas.

San Jose was retroactively declared an independent municipality of Romblon on 1 July 1968 by virtue of Executive Order No. 184.

== Geography ==
San Jose is located at Carabao Island off the southern tip of Tablas Island in Romblon province. It is separated from the municipality of Santa Fe in Tablas by the Cabalian Channel. To the south of San Jose are the municipalities of Malay and Nabas in Aklan province, which are on the north-western tip of Panay Island. It is very close to neighboring Boracay Island, a popular tourist destination for Filipinos and foreigners alike. San Jose is separated from Boracay by a narrow body of sea called Hambil Channel.

San Jose has a total land area of 22.05 square kilometers (8.51 square miles). The island municipality has a diverse geographic profile, with an irregular coastline dotted by white sand beaches that are becoming an alternative tourist destination to neighboring Boracay. Its interior is characterized by undulating hills covered with lush rainforest and coconut trees.

=== Barangays ===
San Jose is politically subdivided into 5 barangays. Each barangay consists of puroks and some have sitios.

- Busay
- Combot
- Lanas
- Pinamihagan
- Poblacion (Agcogon

=== Climate ===
Climate data for San Jose, Romblon
Month	Jan	Feb	Mar	Apr	May	Jun	Jul	Aug	Sep	Oct	Nov	Dec	Year
Mean daily maximum °C (°F)	28 (82)	29 (84)	30 (86)	32 (90)	32 (90)	31 (88)	30 (86)	30 (86)	29 (84)	29 (84)	29 (84)	28 (82)	30 (86)
Mean daily minimum °C (°F)	23 (73)	22 (72)	23 (73)	24 (75)	25 (77)	25 (77)	25 (77)	24 (75)	25 (77)	24 (75)	24 (75)	23 (73)	24 (75)
Average precipitation mm (inches)	47 (1.9)	33 (1.3)	39 (1.5)	48 (1.9)	98 (3.9)	150 (5.9)	169 (6.7)	147 (5.8)	163 (6.4)	172 (6.8)	118 (4.6)	80 (3.1)	1,264 (49.8)
Average rainy days	11.4	8.2	9.3	9.7	19.1	25.6	27.4	25.5	25.5	25.2	18.5	14.5	219.9
Source: Meteoblue

== Demographics ==
Population census of San Jose
Year	Pop.	±% p.a.
1970	4,562	—
1975	5,352	+3.25%
1980	5,797	+1.61%
1990	7,139	+2.10%
1995	7,713	+1.46%
2000	8,226	+1.39%
2007	9,428	+1.90%
2010	10,294	+3.25%
2015	10,881	+1.06%
2020	11,759	+1.65%
2024	11,626	−0.27%
Source: Philippine Statistics Authority

According to the 2024 census, San Jose has a total population of 11,626 people. The municipality has a population density of 534 persons per square kilometer. In 2013, San Jose had 6,662 registered voters distributed into 38 precincts, according to the COMELEC.

San Jose's population is composed mainly of Aeta natives and migrants from Panay who spoke Onhan, also known as Taga-onhan or Inunhan (Hambilanon style), the native language of the inhabitants and one of three major languages in Romblon. Onhan is a variant of the Western Visayan language of Kinaray-a and is thus, spoken not only in Romblon but also in some parts of neighboring Aklan.

Majority of the island's population are Roman Catholic and the Assemblies of God, with a small denomination of Protestants, Seventh-day Adventists, Iglesia ni Cristo, and Jehovah's Witnesses.

== Economy ==
Poverty incidence of San Jose

Source: Philippine Statistics Authority

Fishing and tourism are two of the primary economic activities in San Jose. The latter became a popular source of income in recent years following the influx of tourists to neighboring Boracay Island. Several beach resorts were established along the shores of Carabao Island to take advantage of tourist arrivals. Aside from tourism, San Jose residents also engage in livestock raising, copra farming, vegetable and root crop cultivation, and merchant trading with nearby Santa Fe and Odiongan in Tablas Island, and Boracay in Aklan.

=== Transportation ===
As an island municipality, the only means to reach San Jose is via sea travel. There are several sea routes going to the island. From Manila or Batangas City, there are daily RORO trips going to Odiongan, Romblon or Caticlan in Aklan province. From Odiongan, there are jeepneys that take passengers to Santa Fe, where travellers can take pump boats or bancas going to San Jose. From Caticlan, there are bancas as well that take passengers to San Jose. The island is approximately a 45-minute boat ride from either Santa Fe or Caticlan. San Jose has a municipal port in Barangay Poblacion where passengers and cargo disembark.

Another mode of travel is by air. AirAsia, Cebu Pacific and Philippine Airlines have daily trips to Caticlan Airport from where passengers can take bancas to San Jose.

San Jose's five barangays are connected by a circumferential road, where the common mode of transportation are passenger motorcycles, known elsewhere as habal-habal.

== Government ==
=== Local government ===
As a municipality in the Province of Romblon, government officials in the provincial level are voted by the electorates of the town. The provincial government have political jurisdiction over local transactions of the municipal government.

Pursuant to Chapter II, Title II, Book III of Republic Act 7160 or the Local Government Code of 1991, the municipal government is composed of a mayor (alkalde), a vice mayor (bise alkalde) and eight members (kagawad) of the Sangguniang Bayan or town council, alongside a secretary to the said council, all of which are elected to a three-year term and are eligible to run for three consecutive terms. San Jose's incumbent mayor and vice mayor as of 30 June 2019 are Ronnie Samson and Egdon Sombilon from LAKAS and NPC, respectively.

The barangays or villages, meanwhile, are headed by elected officials, the topmost being the Punong Barangay or the Barangay Chairperson (addressed as Kapitan; also known as the Barangay Captain). The Kapitan is aided by the Sangguniang Barangay (Barangay Council) whose members, called Barangay Kagawad (Councilors), are also elected. The barangays have SK federation which represents the barangay, headed by SK chairperson and whose members are called SK councilors. All officials are also elected every three years.

== Education ==
The San Jose-Santa Fe Schools District Office governs all educational institutions within the municipality. It oversees the management and operations of all private and public, from primary to secondary schools.

=== Primary and elementary schools ===
- Buenavista Elementary School
- Busay Elementary School
- Combot Elementary School
- Inihawan Elementary School
- Lanas Elementary School
- Lindero Elementary School
- Pinamihagan Elementary School
- San Jose Central School

=== Secondary schools ===
- Pinamihagan National High School
- San Jose Agricultural High School
