= Tablas Economic Zone =

Tablas Economic Zone is a special economic zone located in Tablas Island of Romblon, Philippines. It was established in 2015 and being managed by Tablas Economic Zone Inc. (TEZI) under the umbrella of the Philippine Economic Zone Authority (PEZA) and the Department of Trade and Industry (DTI).

Agricultural resources include pili nuts, rice, guyabano, coconuts and cashews. It also has aquatic resources like fish, lobsters and seaweeds and mineral deposits of marble.
