= Tugdan Airport =

Airport serving Romblon, Philippines

Tugdan Airport Paluparan it Tugdan Paliparan ng Tugdan
- IATA: TBH; ICAO: RPVU

Summary
- Airport type: Public
- Owner/Operator: Civil Aviation Authority of the Philippines
- Serves: Romblon
- Elevation AMSL: 3 m (9.8 ft)
- Coordinates: 12°18′39″N 122°5′4″E

Map
- Location within Luzon Location within Philippines

Runways
| Direction | Length | | Surface |
| Direction | m | ft | Surface |
|---|---|---|---|
| 03/21 | 1,390 | 4,560 | Concrete |

Statistics (2022)
- Passengers: 2,308
- Aircraft movements: 60
- Tonnes of cargo: 22,162
- Statistics from the Civil Aviation Authority of the Philippines.

Tugdan Airport (Onhan: Paluparan it Tugdan, Filipino: Paliparan ng Tugdan; IATA: TBH, ICAO: RPVU) is an airport located in the province of Romblon in the Philippines. It is the only airport in the province of Romblon. The airport is located in Barangay Tugdan in the municipality of Alcantara, Tablas Island, from which the airport derives its name. The airport is classified as a class 2 principal airport by the Civil Aviation Authority of the Philippines, a body of the Department of Transportation.

== History ==
On February 24, 2018, Governor Eduardo Firmalo went to the damaged airport police building to inspect it. On September 24, 2022, AirSWIFT held its inaugural flight to the Tugdan Airport from Manila. A flight was cancelled due to rains by Tropical Storm Nalgae. On March 26, 2025, Senator Panfilo Lacson and Representative Budoy Madrona pushed for the expansion of the airport runway for bigger planes. "The expansion of Tablas Airport’s runway is essential for Romblon’s economic growth and tourism development," Lacson said.

== Airlines and destinations ==
| Airlines | Destinations |
|---|---|
| Sunlight Air | Clark |

== Terminal and structures ==
According to a website, the departing and arriving terminals are air-conditioned. Restrooms are spread throughout the terminal. Upon arrival, staff assist with baggage. Souvenir shops are spread throughout the terminal. Tricycles go to and from the airport. A private car and van can also go.

== See also ==
- List of airports in the Philippines
