= Onhan language =

Austronesian language of the Philippines

Onhan
- Loocnon, Inonhan
- Native to: Philippines
- Region: Romblon
- Native speakers: (86,000 cited 2000)
- Language family: Austronesian: Malayo-Polynesian; Philippine; Central Philippine; Bisayan; Western Bisayan; Onhan

Language codes
- ISO 639-3: loc
- Glottolog: inon1237
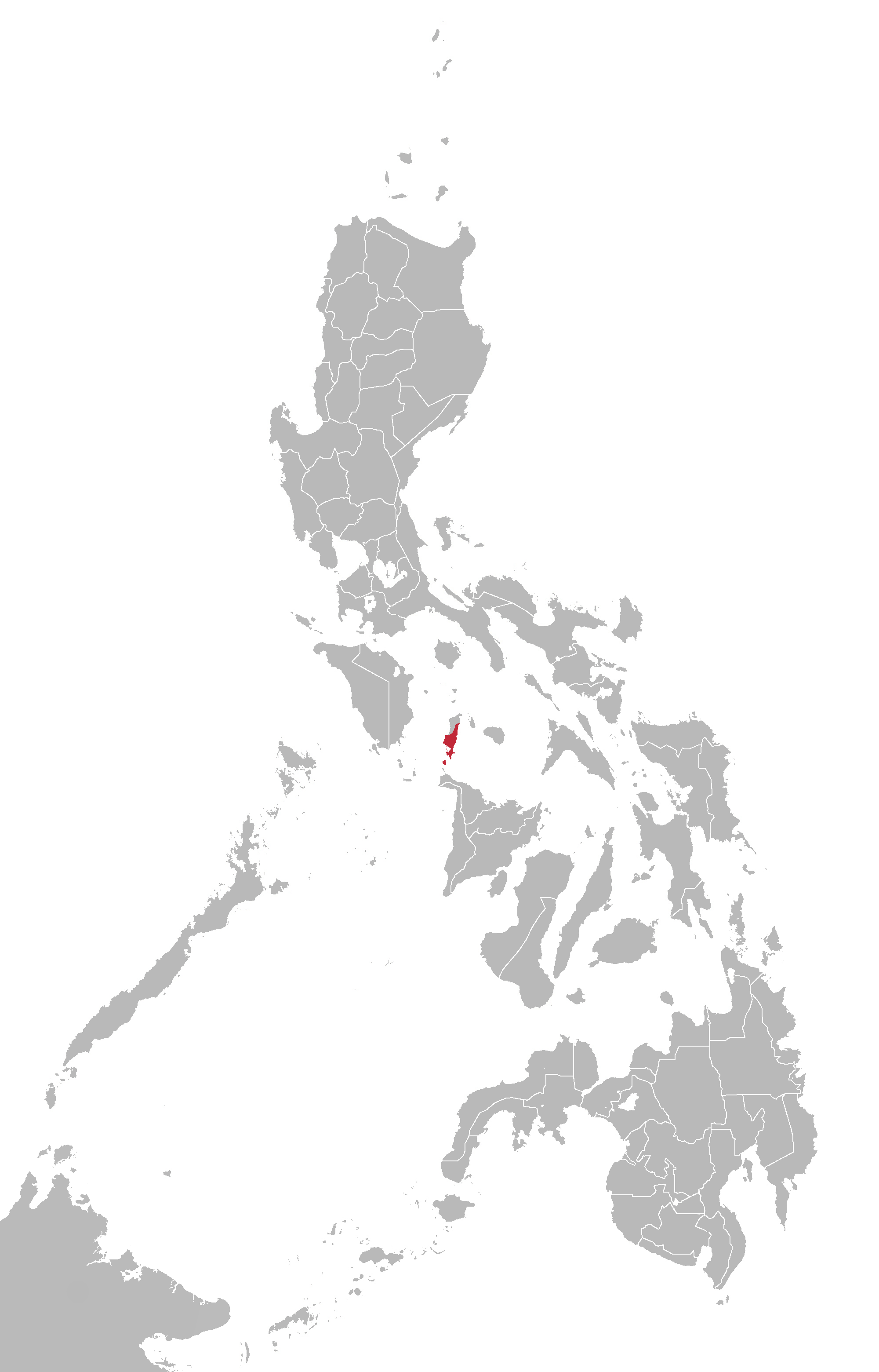
- Inonhan language map based on Ethnologue

Onhan is a regional Western Bisayan language spoken, along with the Romblomanon and Asi languages, in the province of Romblon, Philippines. The language is also known as Inunhan and Loocnon.

== Geographical distribution ==
Specifically, Onhan is spoken on the following islands within Romblon:

- Tablas: the municipalities of San Andres, Santa Maria, Alcantara, Ferrol, Looc, and Santa Fe and some upland sitios in Odiongan.
- Carabao: the sole municipality of San Jose.

As a variant of the Kinaray-a language, some speakers are found on the island of Boracay in Aklan province as well as parts of the island of Panay, specifically in the following municipalities: Malay, Nabas and Buruanga. In the provinces of Oriental and Occidental Mindoro, migrant Onhan speakers from Tablas Island brought the language to the following municipalities: San Jose, Magsaysay, Bulalacao, Mansalay, Roxas, and some parts of Bongabong. As such, it is very much related to Kinaray-a and Kuyonon.

== Dialects ==
The Onhan language has three variants – those spoken in the municipalities of Santa Maria and Alcantara use /l/ instead of /r/. Example: kararaw is kalalaw, and other speakers change /r/ or /l/ to /d/ as in run or lun to dun.

== Grammar ==
=== Pronouns ===
	Absolutive_{1} (emphatic)	Absolutive_{2} (non-emphatic)	Ergative	Oblique
1st person singular	ako	takon	nakon, ko	akon
2nd person singular	ikaw, kaw	timo	nimo, mo	imo
3rd person singular	imaw	–	nana	ana
1st person plural inclusive	kita	taton	naton, ta	aton
1st person plural exclusive	kami	tamon	namon	amon
2nd person plural	kamo	tinyo	ninyo	inyo
3rd person plural	sanda	–	nanda	anda

=== Numbers ===
Number	Onhan	
Number	Ordinal	Cardinal
1	Isyá	Una
2	Darwá	Pangalwa
3	Tatló	Pangatlo
4	Ap-at	Pang-ap-at
5	Limá	Pang-limá
6	An-um	Pang-an-um
7	Pitó	Pang-pitó
8	Waló	Pang-waló
9	Siyám	Pang-siyám
10	Púlô	Pang-púlô
100	Isya-kagatús	
1000	Isya-kalibó	

== Literature ==
The New Testament was translated into Bisaya-Inunhan by Eldon Leano Talamisan and published in 1999.

The Harrow (Ang Singkaw), an official publication of Romblon State University, publishes Inunhan poems, stories and other genres of literature.
