= Looc, Romblon =

Municipality in Romblon, Philippines

Looc
- Municipality
- Municipality of Looc
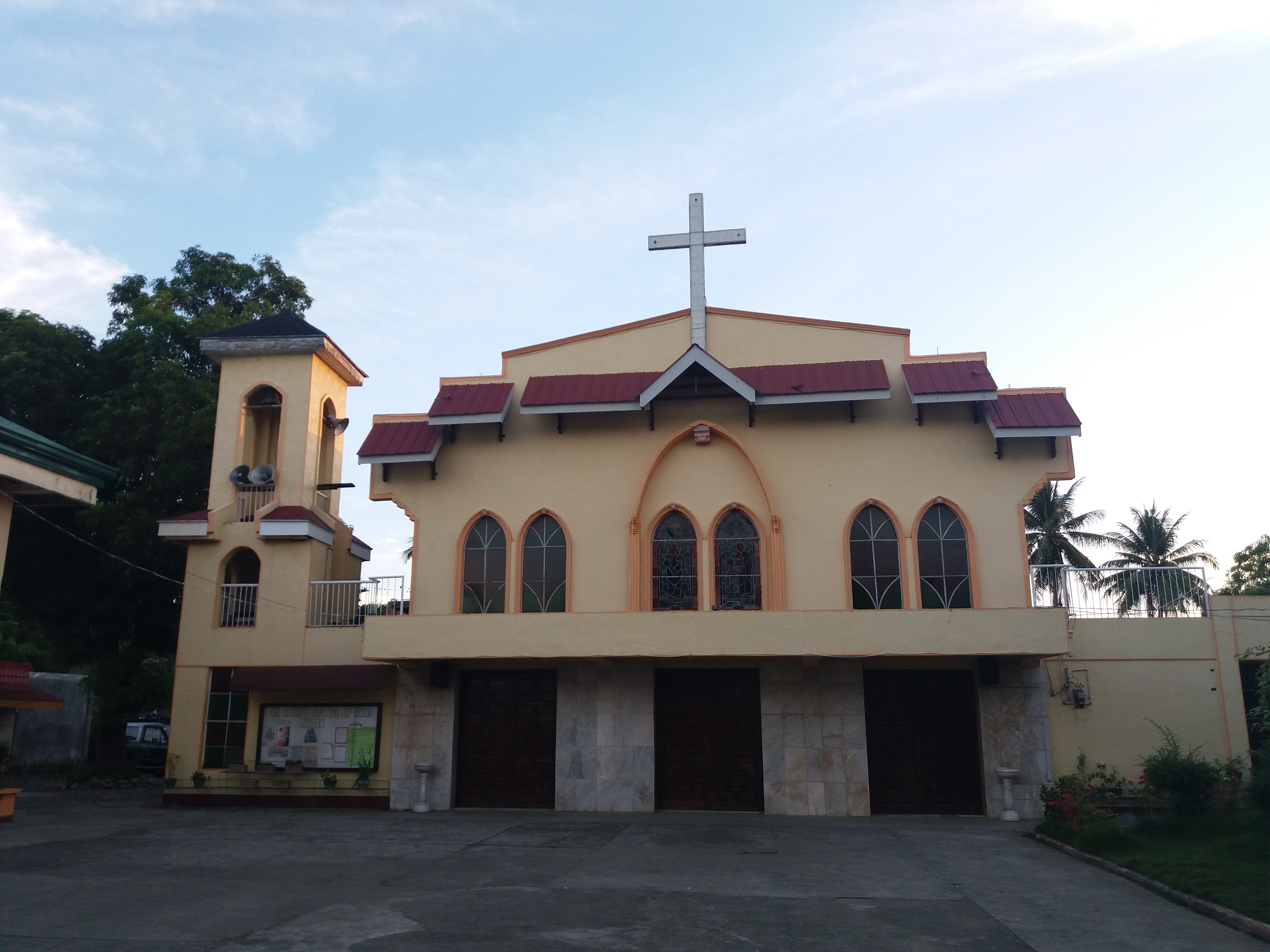

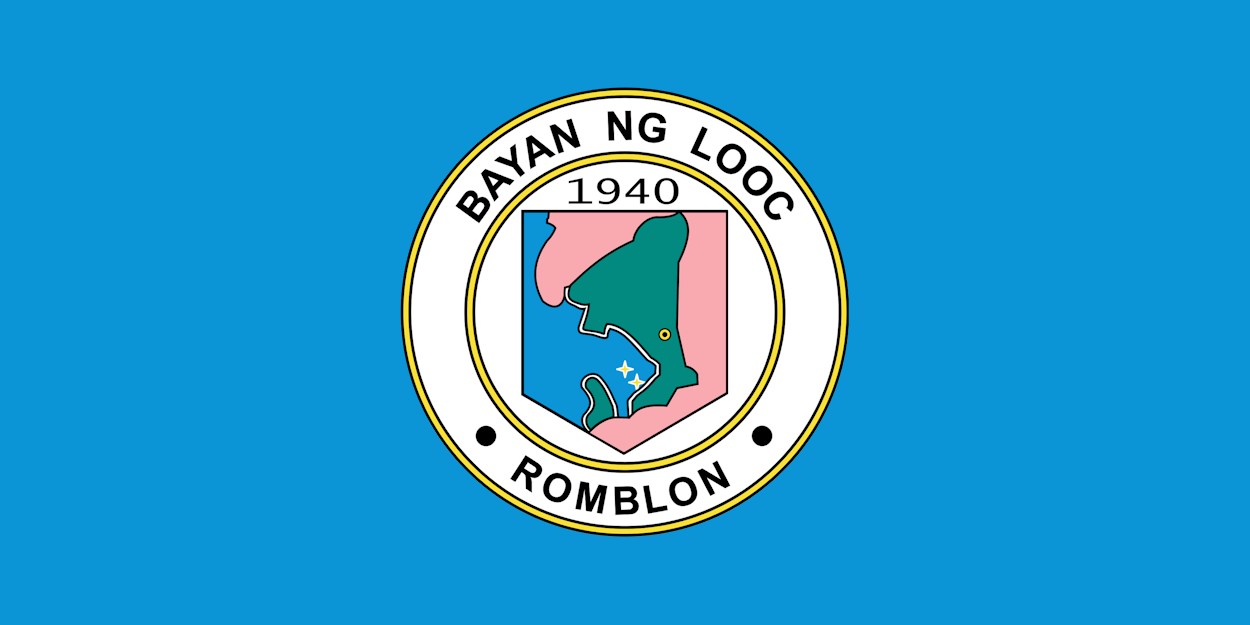
- Flag Seal
- Interactive map of Looc
- Location within the Philippines
- Coordinates: 12°15′38″N 121°59′33″E
- Country: Philippines
- Region: Mimaropa
- Province: Romblon
- District: Lone district
- Founded: 1730
- Incorporated: 1844
- Barangays: 12 (see Barangays)

Government
  - Type: Sangguniang Bayan
  - Mayor: Lisette Arboleda
  - Vice Mayor: Dianson Taytay
  - Representative: Eleandro Jesus F. Madrona
  - Councilors: Gaga Bernardo; Bong Osrio; Benrol Palacio; Ted Tirol; Johnny Aguirre; Hermie Lachica; Michael Francisco; Rolly Bautista
  - Electorate: 15,595 voters (2025)

Area
  - Total: 132.82 km^{2} (51.28 sq mi)
- Elevation: 31 m (102 ft)
- Highest elevation: 198 m (651 ft)
- Lowest elevation: 0 m (0 ft)

Population (2024 census)
  - Total: 21,964
  - Density: 165.37/km^{2} (428.30/sq mi)
  - Households: 5,641

Economy
  - Income class: 3rd municipal income class
  - Poverty incidence: 35.75% (2023)
  - Revenue: ₱ 153.7 million (2024)
  - Assets: ₱ 423.7 million (2024)
  - Expenditure: ₱ 142.2 million (2024)
  - Liabilities: ₱ 92.27 million (2024)

Service provider
  - Electricity: Tablas Island Electric Cooperative (TIELCO)
- Time zone: UTC+8 (PST)
- ZIP code: 5502
- PSGC: 1705907000
- IDD : area code: +63 (0)42
- Native languages: Onhan; Tagalog

Looc, officially the Municipality of Looc, is a municipality in the province of Romblon, Philippines. According to the 2024 census, it has a population of 21,964 people.

It is known as the fish basket of the province, and the location of the Looc bay mariculture park and sanctuary.

== History ==
=== Early history ===
Looc is from the Filipino/Onhan word look, meaning "bay", referring to the body of water the town encloses. The first settlers of Looc where Onhan-speaking tribes from Panay Island which came around 1730. The settlement was originally a barrio of the pueblo (town) of Cabolutan (located in present-day San Agustin) until 1790, when the town's population was wiped-out by a smallpox epidemic and the town was abolished. The abolition transferred Looc under the administration of pueblo de Banton in Banton Island.

In the early 1800s, the settlement continued to progress and increase its population. Thus, in 1844, Spanish colonial authorities converted Looc into a full-pledged pueblo. Back then, Looc was still part of Capiz province, until 19 March 1853, when Romblon was officially declared a district separate from Capiz, and finally a full-fledged province in 1868. Looc was one of the first four municipalities of the newly created province of Romblon, the other three being Romblon (capitol), Banton, and Sibuyan (Cajidiocan). It then comprised the territories of what is now the municipalities of Alcantara and Santa Fe, and Carabao Island. Looc would lose these territories during the American colonial period beginning in 1901.

=== Modern history ===
On 8 June 1940, the municipality was abolished by virtue of Commonwealth Act No. 581, also known as the "Festin Bill" (authored by Congressman Leonardo Festin). Looc was then consolidated into the special municipality of Tablas together with all other municipalities in the island and demoted to a barrio with a representative in the town's capitol in Odiongan. During the Japanese Occupation of the Philippines, the town became one of several emergency municipalities sponsored by the guerilla movement in the province. On 1 October 1946, Commonwealth Act No. 581 was repealed by Republic Act No. 38 (authored by Congressman Modesto Formilleza), thus abolishing the special municipality of Tablas and restoring Looc to its municipal status.

On 21 March 1961, the municipality of Alcantara was created from the eastern barangays of Looc, reducing the municipality to its present size.

== Geography ==
Looc is located along the shores of Looc Bay on the southern portion of Tablas Island. It is bordered to the north by the municipalities of Ferrol and Odiongan, to east by the municipality of Alcantara, to the south by the municipality of Santa Fe and to the west by Looc Bay and Tablas Strait. It has a total land area of 13,282 hectares (32,820 acres). Its topography consists predominantly of slopes which are characterized as nearly level to slightly and strongly undulated rolling hills.

=== Barangays ===
Looc is politically subdivided into 12 barangays. Each barangay consists of puroks and some have sitios.

- Agojo
- Balatucan
- Buenavista
- Camandag
- Guinhaya-an
- Limon Norte
- Limon Sur
- Manhac
- Pili
- Poblacion
- Punta
- Tuguis

=== Climate ===
Climate data for Looc, Romblon
Month	Jan	Feb	Mar	Apr	May	Jun	Jul	Aug	Sep	Oct	Nov	Dec	Year
Mean daily maximum °C (°F)	28 (82)	29 (84)	30 (86)	32 (90)	32 (90)	31 (88)	30 (86)	30 (86)	29 (84)	29 (84)	29 (84)	28 (82)	30 (86)
Mean daily minimum °C (°F)	23 (73)	22 (72)	23 (73)	24 (75)	25 (77)	25 (77)	25 (77)	24 (75)	25 (77)	24 (75)	24 (75)	23 (73)	24 (75)
Average precipitation mm (inches)	47 (1.9)	33 (1.3)	39 (1.5)	48 (1.9)	98 (3.9)	150 (5.9)	169 (6.7)	147 (5.8)	163 (6.4)	172 (6.8)	118 (4.6)	80 (3.1)	1,264 (49.8)
Average rainy days	11.4	8.2	9.3	9.7	19.1	25.6	27.4	25.5	25.5	25.2	18.5	14.5	219.9
Source: Meteoblue

== Demographics ==
Population census of Looc
Year	Pop.	±% p.a.
1903	6,056	—
1918	11,021	+4.07%
1939	18,448	+2.48%
1948	14,830	−2.40%
1960	17,427	+1.35%
1970	12,813	−3.03%
1975	14,864	+3.02%
1980	15,341	+0.63%
1990	19,285	+2.31%
1995	19,196	−0.09%
2000	19,898	+0.77%
2007	20,787	+0.60%
2010	21,841	+1.82%
2015	22,262	+0.36%
2020	21,799	−0.44%
2024	21,964	+0.18%
Source: Philippine Statistics Authority

According to the 2024 census, Looc has a population of 21,964 people.

=== Language ===
Majority of its citizen speak to local dialect, Onhan.

== Economy ==
Poverty incidence of Looc (%)

Source: Philippine Statistics Authority

== Marine sanctuary ==
On 12 January 1999, the 48-hectare Looc Bay Marine Refuge and Sanctuary was officially opened in the municipality after four years of intensive community education on the value and better management of marine resources. The local government, together with the community through their Barangay Fishermen Organization and Looc Baywatch Task Force, worked together to ensure the safety of the Looc's marine resources. The marine sanctuary was awarded two Trailblazing Galing Pook awards in 2000 and 2007 by the Galing Pook Foundation for being the best Coastal Resource Management program. Today, the marine sanctuary is not just a refuge of marine wildlife, but a tourist destination which attracts revenues for the municipality.

== Government ==
=== Local government ===
As a municipality in the Province of Romblon, government officials in the provincial level are voted by the electorates of the town. The provincial government have political jurisdiction over local transactions of the municipal government.

Pursuant to Chapter II, Title II, Book III of Republic Act 7160 or the Local Government Code of 1991, the municipal government is composed of a mayor (alkalde), a vice mayor (bise alkalde) and members (kagawad) of the legislative branch Sangguniang Bayan alongside a secretary to the said legislature, all of which are elected to a three-year term and are eligible to run for three consecutive terms.

Barangays are also headed by elected officials: Barangay Captain, Barangay Council, whose members are called Barangay Councilors. The barangays have SK federation which represents the barangay, headed by SK chairperson and whose members are called SK councilors.

=== Elected officials ===
As of 30 June 2019, the incumbent mayor and vice mayor are Lisette Arboleda and Dianson Taytay, respectively.

== Education ==
The Looc Schools District Office governs all educational institutions within the municipality. It oversees the management and operations of all private and public, from primary to secondary schools.

=== Primary and elementary schools ===
- Agojo Elementary School
- Balatucan Elementary School
- Buenavista Elementary School
- Crispin Grimares Elementary School
- Gov. Gonzales Elementary School
- Guinhaya-An Elementary School
- Jose M. Solis (Camandag Elementary School)
- Limon Norte Elementary School
- Limon Sur Elementary School
- Looc Central Elementary School
- Manhac Elementary School
- Maranatha Christian Academy
- Pili Elementary School
- Punta Elementary School
- Sacred Heart School

=== Secondary schools ===
- Buenavista National High School (Looc National High School Ext)
- Limon Norte National High School
- Looc National High School
- Agojo Integrated School
