= Alcantara, Romblon =

Municipality in Romblon, Philippines

Alcantara
- Municipality
- Municipality of Alcantara
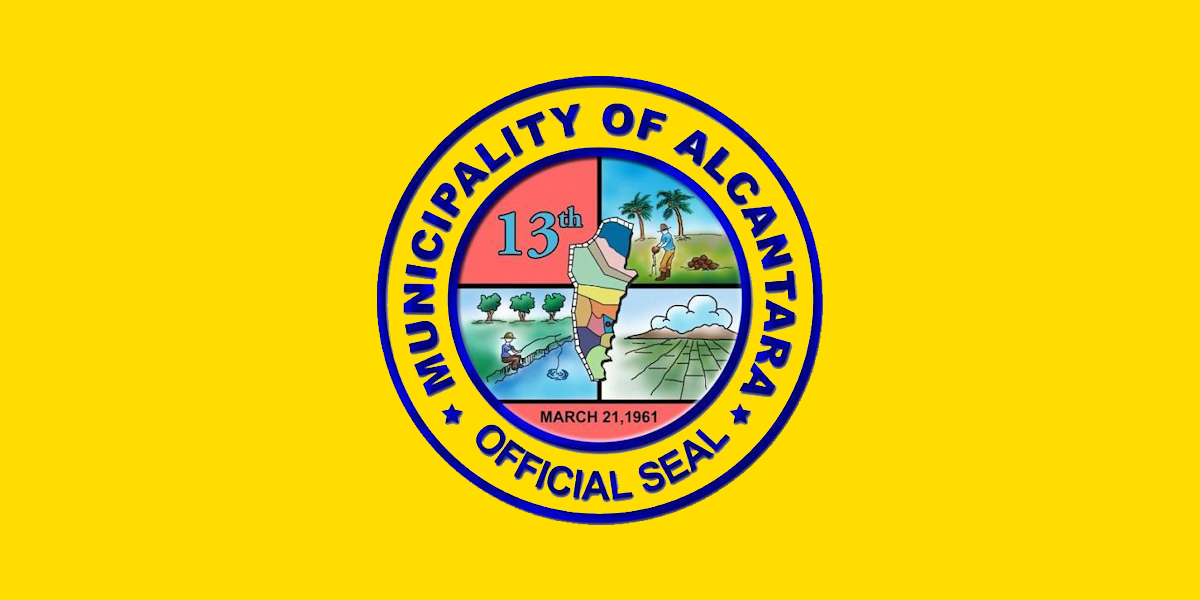
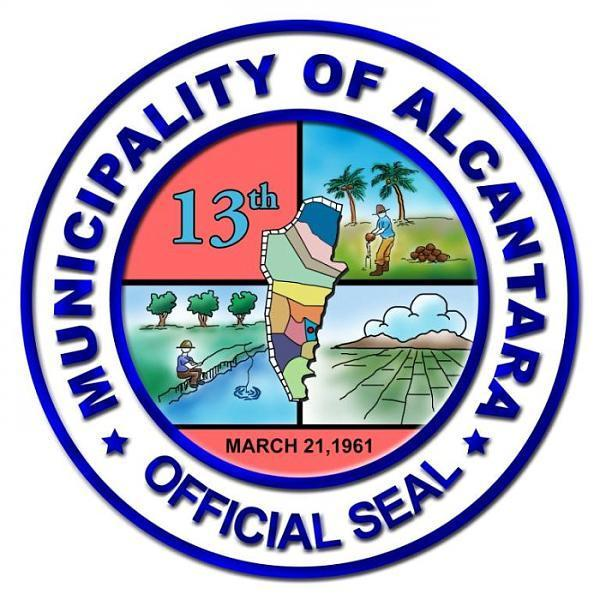
- Flag Seal
- Interactive map of Alcantara
- Location within the Philippines
- Coordinates: 12°15′30″N 122°03′15″E
- Country: Philippines
- Region: Mimaropa
- Province: Romblon
- District: Lone district
- Founded: 1730 (as La Lauan)
- Renamed: 1870 (as Alcantara)
- Incorporated: March 21, 1961
- Barangays: 12 (see Barangays)

Government
  - Type: Sangguniang Bayan
  - Mayor: Riza G. Pamorada
  - Vice Mayor: Adrio "Onyot" Galin, Jr.
  - Representative: Eleandro Jesus F. Madrona
  - Councilors: Danilo Sombilon; Larky John Martino; Jovito Gamul Jr.; Valentin Galicia; Josephine Morales; Mark Jude Ignacio; Cristina Imperial; Edmund Ocampo
  - Electorate: 11,886 voters (2025)

Area
  - Total: 60.12 km^{2} (23.21 sq mi)
- Elevation: 32 m (105 ft)
- Highest elevation: 651 m (2,136 ft)
- Lowest elevation: 0 m (0 ft)

Population (2024 census)
  - Total: 16,417
  - Density: 273.1/km^{2} (707.2/sq mi)
  - Households: 4,149

Economy
  - Income class: 4th municipal income class
  - Poverty incidence: 32.12% (2023)
  - Revenue: ₱ 113.4 million (2024)
  - Assets: ₱ 241.7 million (2024)
  - Expenditure: ₱ 102 million (2024)
  - Liabilities: ₱ 17.98 million (2024)

Service provider
  - Electricity: Tablas Island Electric Cooperative (TIELCO)
- Time zone: UTC+8 (PST)
- ZIP code: 5509
- PSGC: 1705901000
- IDD : area code: +63 (0)42
- Native languages: Onhan; Tagalog

Alcantara, officially the Municipality of Alcantara, is a municipality in the province of Romblon, Philippines. It is located in the southeast portion of Tablas Island, bounded by the municipalities of Santa Maria to the north, Looc to the west, Santa Fe to the south, and the Sibuyan Sea to the east. According to the 2024 census census, it has a population of 16,417 people.

First established in 1730 as La Lauan, a barrio of Looc, the settlement was later renamed Alcantara in 1870 and elevated to municipality status on March 21, 1961. The majority of the population speaks the Alcantaranon variant of Inunhan. Farming and fishing are the primary sources of income, with the coastal waters yielding mackerel, tuna, and other species.

Alcantara is home to Tugdan Airport, the sole airport in Romblon province. The municipality is also recognized for its natural attractions, including the Alcantara Hot Springs, the Mag-Asawang Tubig Hot Spring, the Iyon-Iyon Falls, and Mag-aso Falls, as well as its traditional carabao-drawn carts used for local transportation.

== History ==
Alcantara was first established in 1730 as La Lauan, a barrio of Looc town by migrants from Panay Island led by Don Ciriaco Alcantara. In 1855, the barrio was annexed from Looc and converted into a pueblo or town. However, in 1868, it was abolished and annexed as a barrio of Guintigui-an town (renamed Badajoz, now San Agustin) after a reorganization of municipalities resulting from the creation of Romblon province.

In 1870, due to continuous intimidation from Muslim pirates, as well as the rugged terrain, the residents of La Lauan led by a certain Gaspar Guevarra transferred from its former site in Daan Banwa (or Old Town) and established a new barrio down south called Alcantara, after Don Ciriaco Alcantara. In 1885, it was annexed back as a barrio of Looc, and would remain so until after World War II.

Alcantara was elevated to municipality status on 21 March 1961 by virtue of Executive Order 427 signed by then President Carlos P. Garcia.

== Geography ==
Alcantara lies in the southeast portion of Tablas Island. It is bounded to the north by the municipality of Santa Maria, to the west by Looc, to the south by Santa Fe, and to the east by the Sibuyan Sea. Most of Alcantara lies in plains along the coast with mountains in the interior to the west.

=== Climate ===
Climate data for Alcantara, Romblon
Month	Jan	Feb	Mar	Apr	May	Jun	Jul	Aug	Sep	Oct	Nov	Dec	Year
Mean daily maximum °C (°F)	28 (82)	29 (84)	30 (86)	32 (90)	32 (90)	31 (88)	30 (86)	30 (86)	29 (84)	29 (84)	29 (84)	28 (82)	30 (86)
Mean daily minimum °C (°F)	23 (73)	22 (72)	23 (73)	24 (75)	25 (77)	25 (77)	25 (77)	24 (75)	25 (77)	24 (75)	24 (75)	23 (73)	24 (75)
Average precipitation mm (inches)	47 (1.9)	33 (1.3)	39 (1.5)	48 (1.9)	98 (3.9)	150 (5.9)	169 (6.7)	147 (5.8)	163 (6.4)	172 (6.8)	118 (4.6)	80 (3.1)	1,264 (49.8)
Average rainy days	11.4	8.2	9.3	9.7	19.1	25.6	27.4	25.5	25.5	25.2	18.5	14.5	219.9
Source: Meteoblue

=== Barangays ===
Alcantara is politically subdivided into 12 barangays. Each barangay consists of puroks and some have sitios.

- Bonlao
- Calagonsao
- Camili
- Comod-om
- Madalag
- Poblacion
- San Isidro
- Tugdan
- Bagsik
- Gui-ob
- Lawan
- San Roque

== Demographics ==
Population census of Alcantara
Year	Pop.	±% p.a.
1970	7,991	—
1975	8,749	+1.83%
1980	9,351	+1.34%
1990	11,061	+1.69%
1995	12,246	+1.93%
2000	14,144	+3.14%
2007	15,370	+1.15%
2010	15,428	+0.14%
2015	16,351	+1.11%
2020	17,171	+1.04%
2024	16,417	−1.07%
Source: Philippine Statistics Authority

According to the 2024 census, it has a population of 16,417 people.

=== Language ===
Just like in the neighboring municipality of Santa Maria, majority of the population speaks the Alcantaranon variant of Inunhan or Onhan where /l/ is used instead of /r/.

== Economy ==
Poverty incidence of Alcantara (%)

Source: Philippine Statistics Authority

Farming and fishing are the major sources of income in Alcantara. Fishing grounds along the coastal areas of the municipality abound with mackerel, sea bass, tuna, anchovies, tanguigue, sapsap, and commercial tropical fish for aquariums. Forest products such as nito and huwag are abundant in some of its barangays.

== Government ==
As a municipality in the province of Romblon, government officials in the provincial level are voted by the electorates of the town. The provincial government has political jurisdiction over local transactions of the municipal government.

Pursuant to Chapter II, Title II, Book III of Republic Act 7160 or the Local Government Code of 1991, the municipality of Alcantara is composed of a mayor (alkalde), a vice mayor (bise alkalde) and members (kagawad) of the legislative branch Sangguniang Bayan alongside a secretary to the said legislature, all of which are elected to a three-year term and are eligible to run for three consecutive terms.

Barangays are also headed by elected officials: Barangay Captain, Barangay Council, whose members are called Barangay Councilors. The barangays have SK federation which represents the barangay, headed by SK chairperson and whose members are called SK councilors. All officials are also elected every three years.

== Tourism ==
Because much of Alcantara's interior is made up of mountains covered in lush tropical rainforest, it is being promoted as a hiking destination for backpackers. There are freshwater springs located in Camili, Calogonsao, Bonlao, San Isidro, and Madalag which tourists can enjoy. Other tourist spots in Alcantara include:

- Walls view: Located in mountains and seas. The view offers fantastic viewing deck few meters above sea level. Needs a bit of a hiking and hard trails which attracts health conscious enthusiast.
- Aglicay Beach Resort: This beach has a scenic view. With palm-fringed white sand and clear blue waters.
- Binay-we Beach: This place has its highest peak of popularity in the 1980s and is located 1.2 km from the town proper of Alcantara. It is located in a small cove with fine white sand and calm waters the whole year around. It is partly shielded from the public's prying eyes by huge boulders.
- Saginyogan: It is a local annual festival every March alongside the founding celebration of the Municipality of Alcantara.
- Christmas lighting: Weeks before Christmas, the Municipality of Alcantara is building a massive Christmas tree in the main plaza and the lighting of the tree signifies the start of the festive season. People from other towns flock to witness such a once a year event.

== Local delicacies ==
- Sarsa: Featured in television and digital media, this little treat serves as more of an appetizer. It is made up of river prawns, mixed with grated coconut and cut local chilies wrapped in coconut leaves and boiled to perfection with coconut cream.

== Infrastructure ==
=== Utilities ===
The Tablas Island Electric Cooperative (TIECO) and NAPOCOR supply 57.75 percent of the 2,740 households Alcantara with electricity. As for water supply, Alcantara has one irrigation service with 37 service areas and three community irrigation with 75 service areas. Potable water supply comes from jet pumps, open wells, artesian wells and springs.

=== Transportation and communication ===
Alcantara is home to Romblon's sole airport in Barangay Tugdan. Cebu Pacific operates four flights a week to Romblon via the airport. Visitors going to Alcantara can reach Tablas Island via Odiongan where RORO vessels from Manila, Batangas City, and Roxas, Oriental Mindoro regularly stop by. From Odiongan, Alcantara is just an hour or two by jeepney.

People in the town take public utility jeepneys (PUJ), pedicabs, tricycles, and motorcycles to and from neighboring towns. The Tablas Circumferential Road connects Alcantara with neighboring municipalities. PLDT, Smart, and Globe provide landline and cellular phone services in the municipality.

== Education ==
The Alcantara Schools District Office governs all educational institutions within the municipality. It oversees the management and operations of all private and public, from primary to secondary schools.

Romblon National Institute of Technology (RNIT) is located in Poblacion, formerly Alcantara National Trade School. The town also has three public high schools offering quality education under the Department of Education.

=== Primary and elementary schools ===
- Agbay-Ang Elementary School
- Alcantara Central Elementary School
- Alcantara Christian School
- Bagsik Elementary School
- Bonlao Elementary School
- Calagonsao Elementary School
- Camili Elementary School
- Comod-Om Elementary School
- Don Manuel L. Solidum Memorial Elementary School
- Felipe Madali Memorial Elementary School
- Gui-ob Elementary School
- San Isidro Elementary School
- San Roque Elementary School
- Tugdan Elementary School

=== Secondary schools ===
- Alcantara National High School
- Melodias Imperial Sr. National High School
- Tugdan National High School
