= Santa Fe, Romblon =

Municipality in Romblon, Philippines

Santa Fe Bayan ng Santa Fe
- Municipality
- Municipality of Santa Fe
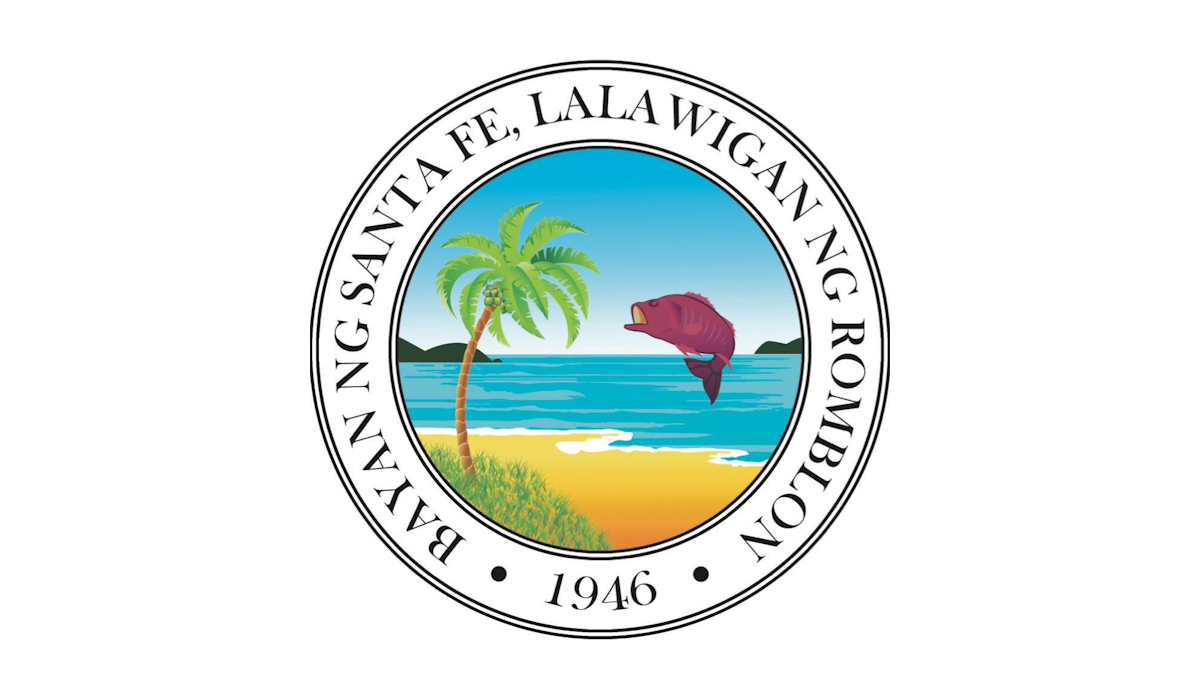
- Flag Seal

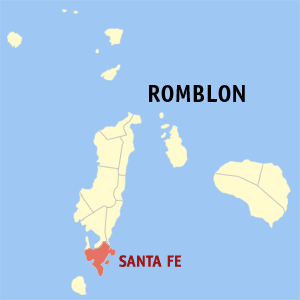
- Map of Romblon with Santa Fe highlighted
- Interactive map of Santa Fe
- Location within the Philippines
- Coordinates: 12°09′N 122°00′E
- Country: Philippines
- Region: Mimaropa
- Province: Romblon
- District: Lone district
- Founded: 1946
- Barangays: 11 (see Barangays)

Government
  - Type: Sangguniang Bayan
  - Mayor: Elsie D. Visca
  - Vice Mayor: Miguel "Mike" M. Galido
  - Representative: Eleandro Jesus F. Madrona
  - Councilors: Dadoy Cawaling; Abraham Visca; Rica Molina; Lennie Cawaling; Blas Cruz; Boragwak Fernando; Gilbert Rufon; W. Melvin Punzalan
  - Electorate: 11,926 voters (2025)

Area
  - Total: 63.52 km^{2} (24.53 sq mi)
- Elevation: 23 m (75 ft)
- Highest elevation: 875 m (2,871 ft)
- Lowest elevation: 0 m (0 ft)

Population (2024 census)
  - Total: 17,578
  - Density: 276.7/km^{2} (716.7/sq mi)
  - Households: 4,490

Economy
  - Income class: 4th municipal income class
  - Poverty incidence: 42.15% (2023)
  - Revenue: ₱ 117.8 million (2024)
  - Assets: ₱ 356.4 million (2024)
  - Expenditure: ₱ 106 million (2024)
  - Liabilities: ₱ 36.85 million (2024)

Service provider
  - Electricity: Tablas Island Electric Cooperative (TIELCO)
- Time zone: UTC+8 (PST)
- ZIP code: 5508
- PSGC: 1705915000
- IDD : area code: +63 (0)42
- Native languages: Onhan; Tagalog

Santa Fe, officially the Municipality of Santa Fe, is a municipality in the province of Romblon, Philippines. According to the 2024 census, it has a population of 17,578 people.

== History ==
Legend says that the barrio was named after a beautiful, lovely daughter of one of its early settlers of the place. She was so loved and revered by the locals that they named her Santa Fe, and in her death, they named the place after her. However, in Relacion de las Yslas Filipinas by Spanish conquistador Miguel de Loarca, it states that the barrio was named after Santa Fe in the province of Granada in Spain. Its first settlers were Onhan-speaking Negritos from Panay Island who emigrated to Tablas as early as 1730.

During the Spanish colonial period, Santa Fe was a barrio of neighboring Looc town until 1855 when it was established as a separate pueblo or town. It was abolished and reverted into a barrio again in 1868. In 1892, the Spaniards restored Santa Fe's municipal status, which would remain until the American colonial period.

Santa Fe was one 11 municipalities created in Romblon when civilian government was established in the province. However, on 10 March 1917, it was abolished and reverted once more into a barrio of Looc. On 8 January 1940, by virtue of Commonwealth Act No. 581, authored by Romblon congressman Leonardo Festin, the municipality of Looc was abolished and incorporated into a new special municipality called Tablas. Hence, Santa Fe became a barrio of this special municipality.

On 1 October 1946, by virtue of Republic Act No. 38 authored by Romblon congressman Modesto Formilleza, the special municipality of Tablas was abolished and Looc municipality was reinstated. The law also created Santa Fe into an independent municipality.

Santa Fe is also the home of Pinoy Big Brother Season 1 big winner Nene Tamayo.

== Geography ==
Santa Fe has a total land area of 63.52 km^{2}. It lies on the southern tip of Tablas Island. The town is mountainous with so many beaches and islets. It has sandy loam type of soil rich with mineral resources such as granite and white clay. The tallest elevation in the town is Mount Calatong.

=== Barangays ===
Santa Fe is politically subdivided into 11 barangays. Each barangay consists of puroks and some have sitios.

- Agmanic
- Canyayo
- Danao Norte
- Danao Sur
- Guinbirayan
- Guintigbasan
- Magsaysay
- Mat-i
- Pandan
- Poblacion
- Tabugon

=== Climate ===
Climate data for Santa Fe, Romblon
Month	Jan	Feb	Mar	Apr	May	Jun	Jul	Aug	Sep	Oct	Nov	Dec	Year
Mean daily maximum °C (°F)	28 (82)	29 (84)	30 (86)	32 (90)	32 (90)	31 (88)	30 (86)	30 (86)	29 (84)	29 (84)	29 (84)	28 (82)	30 (86)
Mean daily minimum °C (°F)	23 (73)	22 (72)	23 (73)	24 (75)	25 (77)	25 (77)	25 (77)	24 (75)	25 (77)	24 (75)	24 (75)	23 (73)	24 (75)
Average precipitation mm (inches)	47 (1.9)	33 (1.3)	39 (1.5)	48 (1.9)	98 (3.9)	150 (5.9)	169 (6.7)	147 (5.8)	163 (6.4)	172 (6.8)	118 (4.6)	80 (3.1)	1,264 (49.8)
Average rainy days	11.4	8.2	9.3	9.7	19.1	25.6	27.4	25.5	25.5	25.2	18.5	14.5	219.9
Source: Meteoblue

== Demographics ==
Population census of Santa Fe
Year	Pop.	±% p.a.
1903	3,746	—
1948	8,168	+1.75%
1960	8,987	+0.80%
1970	8,032	−1.12%
1975	8,939	+2.17%
1980	9,948	+2.16%
1990	11,628	+1.57%
1995	12,665	+1.61%
2000	14,140	+2.39%
2007	16,315	+1.99%
2010	15,700	−1.39%
2015	16,098	+0.48%
2020	17,802	+2.14%
2024	17,578	−0.30%
Source: Philippine Statistics Authority

At the 2024 census, Santa Fe had a population of 17,578 people.

Most of its natives descended from Ati indigenous people from Panay Island.

=== Language ===
Majority of its population speak the Loocnon variant of Inunhan that switches /r/ or /l/ for /d/.

=== Religion ===
The townsfolk are predominantly Roman Catholic. Every April, they celebrate the Fiesta sa Dagat, also known as "Fisherfolk's Day" in honor of St. Vincent Ferrer, the town's patron saint. Other Christian denominations include the Philippine Independent Church, Foursquare Gospel Church in the Philippines, Assemblies of God, Baptist Church, Jehovah's Witnesses, Seventh-day Adventist Church, and the Potter's Fellowship.

== Economy ==
Poverty incidence of Santa Fe (%)

Source: Philippine Statistics Authority

Agriculture is the most important sector in the municipality. This sector comprises sub-sectors namely: crops, livestock, poultry, and fishing. Crops like rice, corn, mango, cassava, banana, sweet yam and coconut are raised by farmers. Coconut comprises the largest share of the agricultural area of the municipality and is dominantly grown in all barangays.

== Infrastructure ==
National Power Corporation (NPC) supplies 32.37% (or 836 households) of Santa Fe's households with electricity. The town is serviced by Levels 1, 2 and 3 water supply system. It also has four community irrigation projects with 92 service areas. Potable water is also supplied from water pumps, artesian wells, and rainwater collection reservoirs. PLDT, Smart Communications, and Globe Telecom provides landline and cellular phone service in the municipality. Radio, as well as, terrestrial and cable television services are also available.

Santa Fe Municipal Port caters to intra-provincial travel, particularly between San Jose in Carabao Island. The town is connected to the neighboring towns of Looc and Alcantara through the Tablas Circumferential Road. Jeepneys, tricycles, and motorcycles are to common forms of transportation.

== Transportation ==
From Looc town proper, there are scheduled jeepney trips going to Odiongan. The earliest trip is at 5 a.m. and travel time is one hour. Travelers may expect some delays as the jeepneys will halt every now and then to unload and load passengers along the way. The jeepney route's terminus is at Odiongan Public Market, where travelers can ride a tricycle to get to Odiongan Port. Fare is around P100 and may take 15–20 minutes bumpy ride. At Odiongan Port, there are scheduled RORO ferry trips by Montenegro Lines, Starlite Ferries and 2GO Travel.

Travelers can also reach Santa Fe by flying to Tugdan Airport in neighboring Alcantara. Cebu Pacific operates four flights weekly to the airport from Manila.

== Tourism ==
There are several beaches and other scenic spots to visit in Santa Fe. These include:

- Mateo Beach Resort: Situated along a rough and winding road at Sitio Guinpoingan in Barangay Tabugon, only 5 kilometers away from the Poblacion. The place has stretches of white sand and clear blue waters.
- Santa Fe Trail This mountainous zigzag road leading to Santa Fe offers views of Tablas Strait, Looc Bay, the neighboring island of Panay, San Jose, and Boracay Island. A common place for strolling and sightseeing.
- Canyayo Beach It is located in Barangay Canyayo, some 4 kilometers from the Poblacion. This beach is a combination of white sands and crushed corals. Its ocean floor is of pebbles and drops abruptly.
- Japar Islet Located off coast of Barangay Guinbirayan. It is a small islet dotted with golden-hued sandy beaches. The sea here is generally calm the whole year and considered the richest ground in the province.

=== Local government ===
As a municipality in the Province of Romblon, government officials in the provincial level are voted by the electorates of the town. The provincial government have political jurisdiction over local transactions of the municipal government.

Pursuant to Chapter II, Title II, Book III of Republic Act 7160 or the Local Government Code of 1991, the municipal government is composed of a mayor (alkalde), a vice mayor (bise alkalde) and members (kagawad) of the legislative branch Sangguniang Bayan alongside a secretary to the said legislature, all of which are elected to a three-year term and are eligible to run for three consecutive terms.

Barangays are also headed by elected officials: Barangay Captain, Barangay Council, whose members are called Barangay Councilors. The barangays have SK federation which represents the barangay, headed by SK chairperson and whose members are called SK councilors. All officials are also elected every three years.

=== Elected officials ===
Santa Fe's incumbent mayor and vice mayor are Elsie Visca and Miguel M. Galido, both from the PDP–Laban party, respectively.

== Education ==
The San Jose-Santa Fe Schools District Office governs all educational institutions within the municipality. It oversees the management and operations of all private and public, from primary to secondary schools.

=== Primary and elementary schools ===
- Agmanic Elementary School
- Canyayo Elementary School
- Danao Sur Elementary School
- Guinbirayan Elementary School
- Guinpoingan Elementary School
- Guintigbasan Elementary School
- Lamberto Antaran Memorial School
- Magsaysay Elementary School
- Mat-I Elementary School
- Pandan Elementary School
- Silvino G. Gajarion Elementary School
- Santa Fe Central Elementary School
- St. Vincent Ferrer School
- Tabugon Elementary School
- V. A. Gutierrez Montiel Memorial Elementary School

=== Secondary schools ===
- Agripino Armedilla National High School
- Guinbirayan National High School
- Sta. Fe National High School
- Tranquilino Cawaling Sr. National High School
