= Santa Maria, Romblon =

Municipality in Romblon, Philippines

Santa Maria
- Municipality
- Municipality of Santa Maria
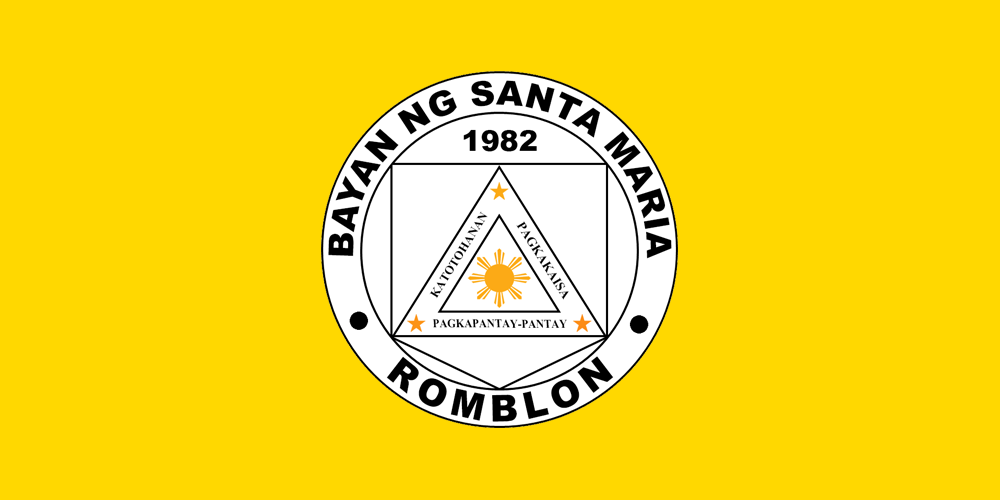
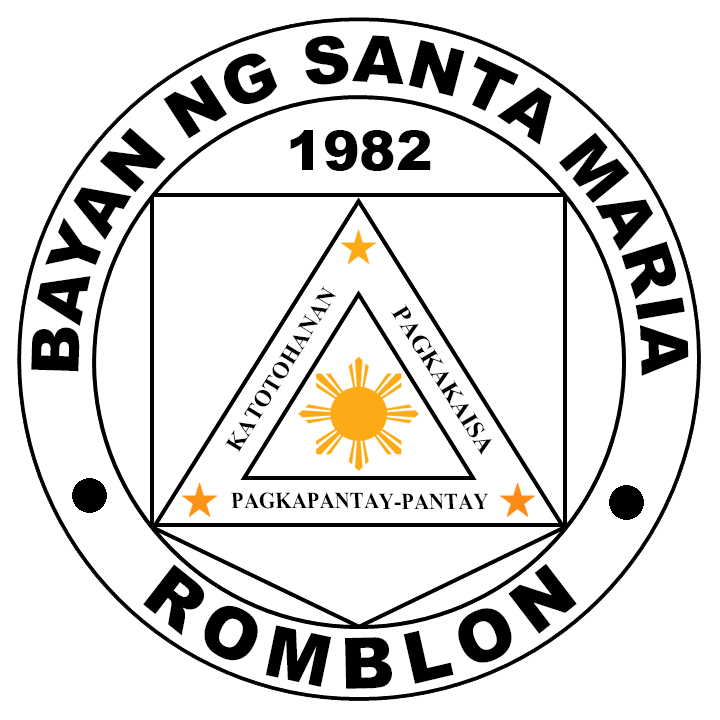
- Flag Seal

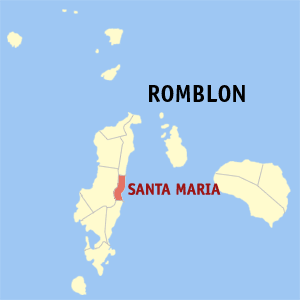
- Map of Romblon with Santa Maria highlighted
- Interactive map of Santa Maria
- Location within the Philippines
- Coordinates: 12°26′30″N 122°06′15″E
- Country: Philippines
- Region: Mimaropa
- Province: Romblon
- District: Lone district
- Founded: 1982
- Barangays: 6 (see Barangays)

Government
  - Type: Sangguniang Bayan
  - Mayor: Lorilie "Bic-Bic" M. Fabon
  - Vice Mayor: Roland M. Largueza
  - Representative: Eleandro Jesus F. Madrona
  - Councilors: Ruel Mortel; Joysie Astillo; Danilo Dalisay; Limuel Manago; Marlin Mariño; Bernard Madrid; Dennis Corpin; Sonny Rico
  - Electorate: 6,716 voters (2025)

Area
  - Total: 36.20 km^{2} (13.98 sq mi)
- Elevation: 52 m (171 ft)
- Highest elevation: 651 m (2,136 ft)
- Lowest elevation: 0 m (0 ft)

Population (2024 census)
  - Total: 8,360
  - Density: 231/km^{2} (598/sq mi)
  - Households: 2,396

Economy
  - Income class: 5th municipal income class
  - Poverty incidence: 35.09% (2023)
  - Revenue: ₱ 83.63 million (2024)
  - Assets: ₱ 253.8 million (2024)
  - Expenditure: ₱ 74.69 million (2024)
  - Liabilities: ₱ 30.22 million (2024)

Service provider
  - Electricity: Tablas Island Electric Cooperative (TIELCO)
- Time zone: UTC+8 (PST)
- ZIP code: 5508
- PSGC: 1705917000
- IDD : area code: +63 (0)42
- Native languages: Onhan; Romblomanon; Tagalog

Santa Maria, officially the Municipality of Santa Maria, (formerly Imelda), is a municipality in the province of Romblon, Philippines. According to the 2024 census, it has a population of 8,360 people.

== Etymology ==
The place got its name from Santa Maria in it was renamed in 1988.

== History ==
Santa Maria was known in Spanish times as Cagbagacay, after a bamboo plant called "bagacay" in the local dialect, which was in abundance in the area. Back then it was still a barrio of Guintigui-an town. In 1910, barrio Cagbagacay was renamed Concepcion after its patron the Immaculada Concepcion.

On September 12, 1982, barrio Concepcion (Norte) together with barrios Bonga and Concepcion Sur were organized and created into a new municipality by virtue of Batas Pambansa Blg. 234, authored by Assemblyman Nemesio Ganan Jr. The new municipality was named "Imelda", in honor of then First Lady Imelda Marcos, as well as to distinguish the town from Concepcion municipality on Maestre de Campo Island, also in Romblon.

After the People Power Revolution in 1986 which toppled the regime of dictator Ferdinand Marcos, the town was renamed Santa Maria on April 17, 1988, by virtue of Republic Act No. 6651, again in honor of its patron the Immaculate Conception of the Blessed Virgin Mary. Three new barangays were added to the municipality: San Isidro, Paroyhog, and Santo Nino.

== Geography ==
Situated on the eastern side of Tablas Island, Santa Maria faces the Sibuyan Sea. It is bounded in the north by the municipality of San Agustin, in the south by the municipality of Alcantara, in the west by the municipality of Odiongan and in the east by Romblon Pass. Santa Maria has a total land area of 3,620 hectares (8,900 acres). It is generally mountainous with a limited portion of the plain area along the coast. The town is considered one of the most peaceful areas in the province.

=== Barangays ===
Santa Maria is politically subdivided into 6 barangays. Each barangay consists of puroks and some have sitios.

- Bonga
- Concepcion Norte (Poblacion)
- Concepcion Sur
- Paroyhog
- Santo Niño
- San Isidro

=== Climate ===
Climate data for Santa Maria, Romblon
Month	Jan	Feb	Mar	Apr	May	Jun	Jul	Aug	Sep	Oct	Nov	Dec	Year
Mean daily maximum °C (°F)	28 (82)	29 (84)	30 (86)	31 (88)	31 (88)	30 (86)	29 (84)	29 (84)	29 (84)	29 (84)	29 (84)	28 (82)	29 (85)
Mean daily minimum °C (°F)	21 (70)	21 (70)	22 (72)	23 (73)	25 (77)	25 (77)	25 (77)	25 (77)	25 (77)	24 (75)	23 (73)	22 (72)	23 (74)
Average precipitation mm (inches)	31 (1.2)	20 (0.8)	25 (1.0)	39 (1.5)	152 (6.0)	269 (10.6)	314 (12.4)	285 (11.2)	303 (11.9)	208 (8.2)	95 (3.7)	70 (2.8)	1,811 (71.3)
Average rainy days	9.5	7.1	9.0	11.3	21.0	25.7	28.1	26.5	27.3	24.6	16.5	12.1	218.7
Source: Meteoblue

== Demographics ==
Population census of Santa Maria
Year	Pop.	±% p.a.
1990	6,459	—
1995	7,785	+3.56%
2000	7,324	−1.30%
2007	7,520	+0.36%
2010	7,683	+0.78%
2015	8,508	+1.96%
2020	8,989	+1.16%
2024	8,360	−1.73%
Source: Philippine Statistics Authority

According to the 2024 census, it has a population of 8,360 people.

=== Language ===
Onhan, also known as Taga-onhan or Inunhan (Alcantaranhon style), is the native language of majority of its inhabitants, while Romblomanon or Ini is the native tongue in the two northern barangays of Bonga and Santo Niño (Bitaugan).

== Economy ==
Poverty incidence of Santa Maria (%)

Source: Philippine Statistics Authority

== Government ==
=== Local government ===
As a municipality in the Province of Romblon, government officials in the provincial level are voted by the electorates of the town. The provincial government have political jurisdiction over local transactions of the municipal government.

Pursuant to Chapter II, Title II, Book III of Republic Act 7160 or the Local Government Code of 1991, the municipal government is composed of a mayor (alkalde), a vice mayor (bise alkalde) and members (kagawad) of the legislative branch Sangguniang Bayan alongside a secretary to the said legislature, all of which are elected to a three-year term and are eligible to run for three consecutive terms.

Barangays are also headed by elected officials: Barangay Captain, Barangay Council, whose members are called Barangay Councilors. The barangays have SK federation which represents the barangay, headed by SK chairperson and whose members are called SK councilors. All officials are also elected every three years.

Period	Mayor	Vice Mayor
30 June 2010 - 30 June 2013	Artemio R. Madrid (NP)	Dennis Corpin y Fortu (Lakas–CMD)
30 June 2013 – 30 June 2016	Artemio R. Madrid (NP)	Dennis Corpin y Fortu (Lakas–CMD)
30 June 2016 - 30 June 2019	Artemio R. Madrid (NP)	Lorilie "Bic-Bic" Fabon (IND)
30 June 2019 - 30 June 2022	Lorilie "Bic-Bic" Fabon	Dennis Corpin y Fortu
30 June 2022 - 30 June 2025	Lorilie "Bic-Bic" Fabon	Roland Largueza (NP)
30 June 2025 - incumbent	Lorilie "Bic-Bic" Fabon	Roland Largueza (NP)

^{a} Died in office.
^{b} Served in acting capacity.
^{c} Resigned.

=== Elected officials ===
The incumbent mayor is Lorilie "Bic-Bic" Fabon y Manito y Fetalino while the incumbent vice mayor is Roland M. Largueza.

== Education ==
The San Agustin-Calatrava Schools District Office governs all educational institutions within the municipality. It oversees the management and operations of all private and public, from primary to secondary schools.

=== Primary and elementary schools ===
- Bonga Elementary School
- Concepcion Norte Elementary School
- Concepcion Sur Elementary School
- Paroyhog Elementary School
- Sto. Niño Elementary School
- Talamban Elementary School

=== Secondary schools ===
- Santa Maria National High School
- Sto Nino National High School

== Sister cities ==
- (Philippines) Makati: On February 8, 2008, Santa Maria Mayor Fred Hernandez and Makati Mayor Jejomar Binay signed a sisterhood relationship agreement between the two local government units.

== See also ==
- List of renamed cities and municipalities in the Philippines
