= Odiongan =

Municipality in Romblon, Philippines

- Municipality
- Municipality of Odiongan
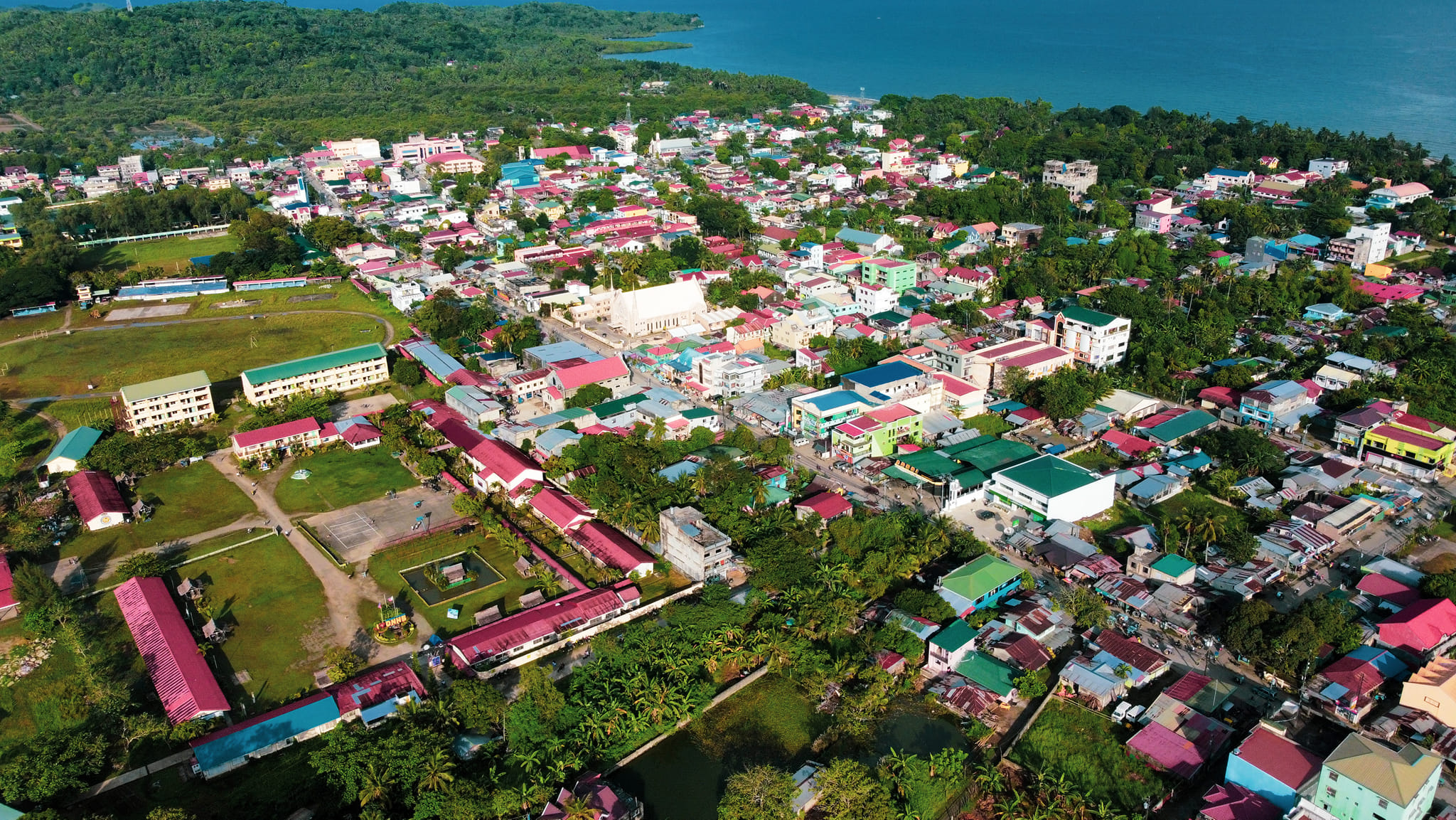
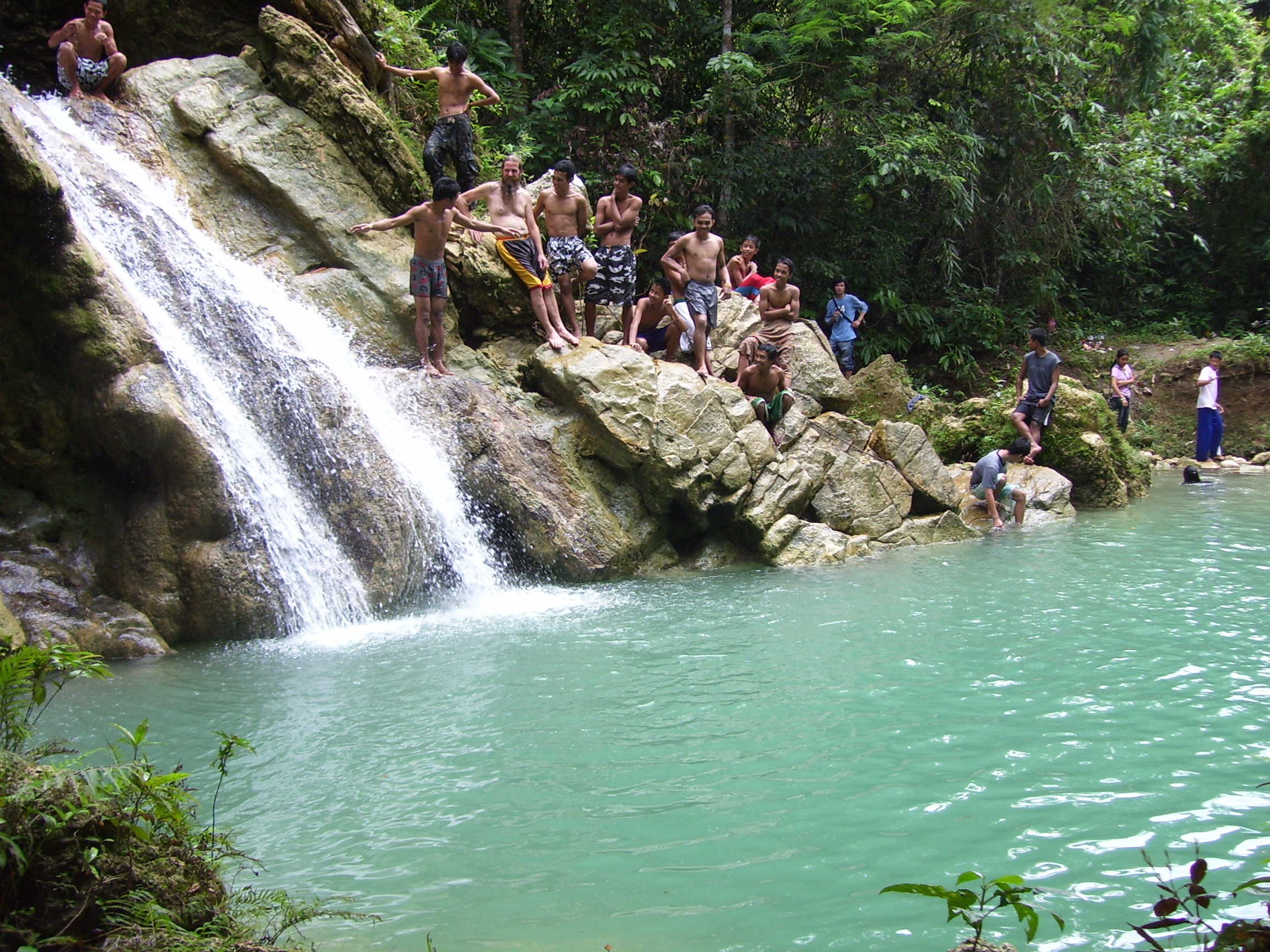
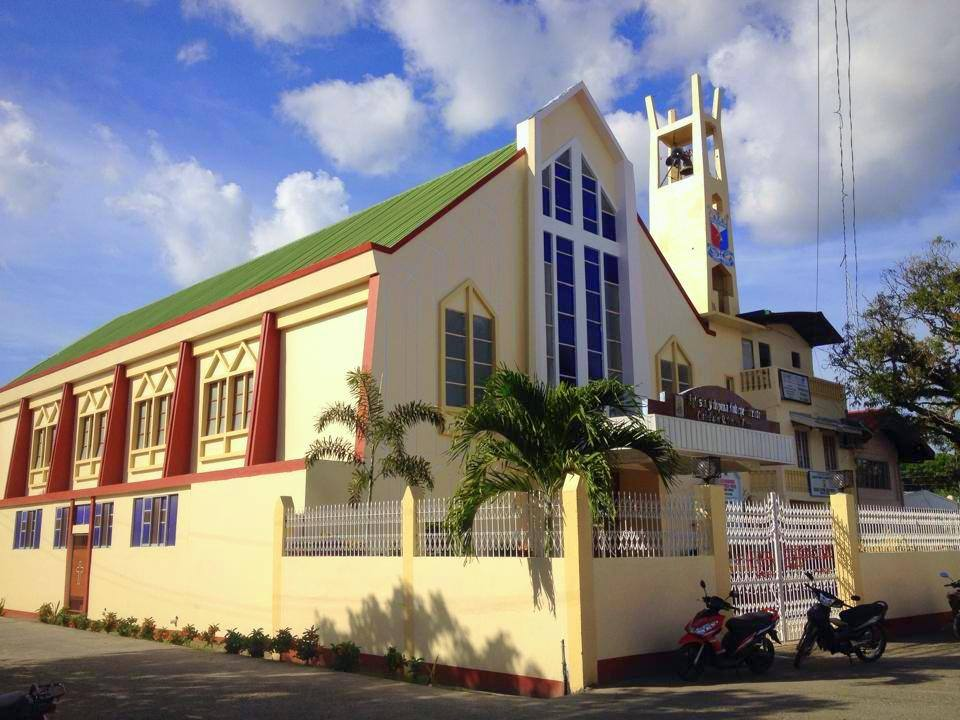
- Poblacion aerial view, with the Odiongan National High School seen bottom left Mainit Falls IFI Cathedral of St. Vincent Ferrer

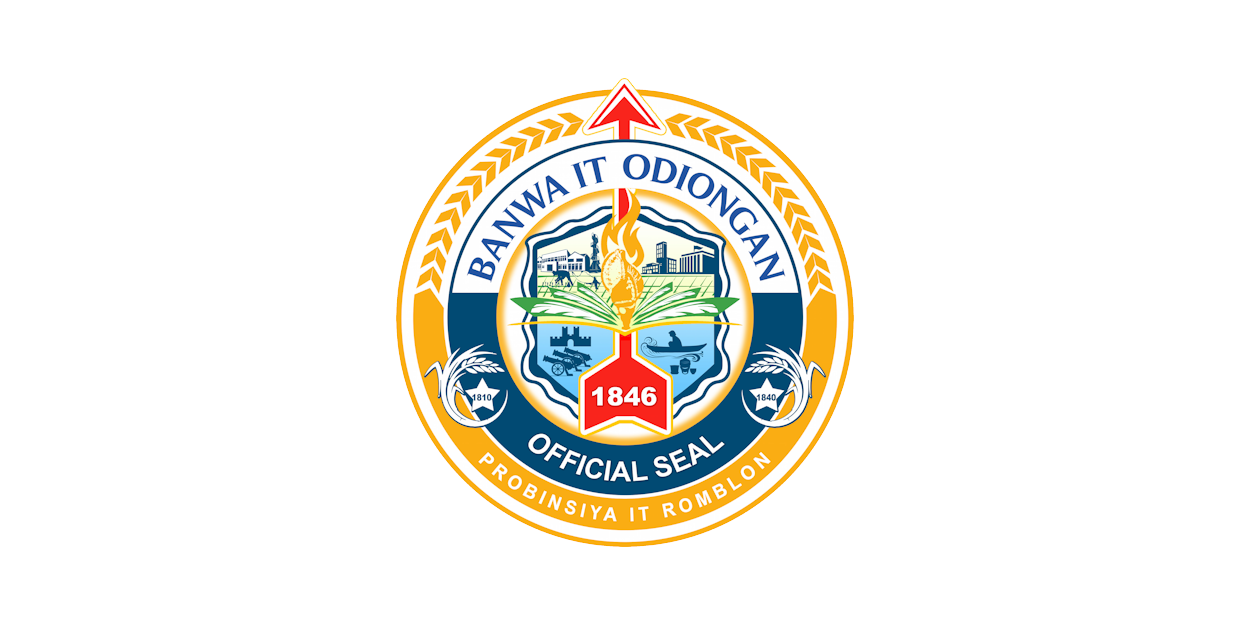
- Flag Seal
- Anthem: Odiongan Hymn
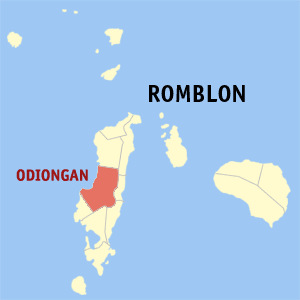
- Map of Romblon with Odiongan highlighted
- Interactive map of Odiongan
- Location within the Philippines
- Coordinates: 12°24′N 122°00′E
- Country: Philippines
- Region: Mimaropa
- Province: Romblon
- District: Lone district
- Founded: 1847
- Barangays: 25 (see Barangays)

Government
  - Type: Sangguniang Bayan
  - Mayor: Roger "Toto" Q. Fodra, Jr.
  - Vice Mayor: Michael "Butchoy" M. Arevalo
  - Representative: Eleandro Jesus F. Madrona
  - Councilors: Juvy F. Faderogaya; Kaila A. Yap; Quincy Anne Bantang-Cabrera; Jackiri M. Fernandez; Romeo F. Chua, Jr.; Nicky A. Faderogao; Manuel F. Fernandez, Jr.; Joel F. Falogme
  - Electorate: 33,100 voters (2025)

Area
  - Total: 185.67 km^{2} (71.69 sq mi)
- Elevation: 53 m (174 ft)
- Highest elevation: 655 m (2,149 ft)
- Lowest elevation: 0 m (0 ft)

Population (2024 census)
  - Total: 48,133
  - Density: 259.24/km^{2} (671.43/sq mi)
  - Households: 12,769
- Demonym: Odionganon

Economy
  - Income class: 1st municipal income class
  - Poverty incidence: 14.75% (2023)
  - Revenue: ₱ 274.1 million (2024)
  - Assets: ₱ 660.9 million (2024)
  - Expenditure: ₱ 229.4 million (2024)
  - Liabilities: ₱ 66.74 million (2024)

Service provider
  - Electricity: Tablas Island Electric Cooperative (TIELCO)
- Time zone: UTC+8 (PST)
- ZIP code: 5511
- PSGC: 1705909000
- IDD : area code: +63 (0)42
- Native languages: Bantoanon; Onhan; Ati; Tagalog

Odiongan, officially the Municipality of Odiongan (Bantoanon: Banwa it Odiongan, Filipino: Bayan ng Odiongan), is a municipality in the province of Romblon, Philippines. According to the 2024 census, it has a population of 48,133 people. It is composed of 25 barangays.

With Odiongan having the largest income and population in the province of Romblon, the town has grown to become a major port and the commercial center of the province.

== History ==
=== Early history ===
There is a legend that the inhabitants there found an "odiong" (local term for "arrow") struck onto a tree; thus, the place was called inodiongan, meaning "struck by an arrow", which later metamorphosed to Odiongan.

Historically, Odiongan, as the largest municipality on Tablas Island, Romblon, was first inhabited by the Negritos and the Mangyan tribes from Panay Island to the south and Mindoro Island to the west, respectively. This was followed shortly by Onhan-speaking settlers from Panay. Around 1810, a group of Bantoanon-speaking people settled in the area in search of a place more suitable for agriculture. However, the settlement founded by these Bantoanons were destroyed and pillaged by Muslim pirates. In 1840, another attempt was made by a different group of Bantoanons; this time, they constructed a fort or cota which protected the settlement from attacks and natural calamities. In 1855, the settlement was officially designated by the Spanish colonial authorities as a pueblo or town. When the Philippine Revolution broke out in 1898, the town joined the cause of the revolutionaries led by Tomas Fiedacan, who became the first mayor of Odiongan on 1898 to 1899.

=== Modern history ===
During the American colonial period in the Philippines, Odiongan faced a number of catastrophes: a cholera epidemic in 1902 killed much of the town's population, a strong typhoon lashed the town in 1908, and famine struck the town in 1914.

In 1940, the town became the seat of the special municipality of Tablas, created by virtue of Commonwealth Act No. 581 (authored by Congressman Leonardo Festin), which covered the entire island. It remained so throughout the Japanese occupation of the Philippines from 1941 to 1945. During that time, Odiongan was chosen as the headquarters of the resistance movement in the province, under the leadership of Lt. Col. Enrique Jurado. On 4 September 1943, a Japanese gunboat shelled the town to force the guerrillas out of hiding. This was followed the following month by a landing of Japanese forces from Panay, which massacred people in the various towns of Tablas, Romblon, and Sibuyan, including Odiongan.

On 1 October 1946, the special municipality of Tablas was abolished by Republic Act No. 38. The following year, Odiongan was restored to its original jurisdiction as municipality in the province of Romblon.

== Geography ==
Odiongan is located in the mid-western part of Tablas Island. It is bounded by San Andres and San Agustin to the north, by Santa Maria to the east, by Looc and Alcantara to the south, and by Ferrol and Tablas Strait to the west.

Odiongan has a total land area of 18,567 hectares (45,880 acres). Much of the town lies in the low-lying plains along the coast, with rolling hills and mountainous forest area at the interior. It has a good anchorage in Barangay Poctoy which serves as link between the islands of Mindoro, Panay and to the luzon island via Batangas or Lucena .

=== Barangays ===
Odiongan is politically subdivided into 25 barangays. Each barangay consists of puroks and some have sitios.

Budiong was formerly a sitio of Canduyong; it became a barrio in 1954.

- Amatong
- Anahao
- Bangon
- Batiano
- Budiong
- Canduyong
- Dapawan (Poblacion)
- Gabawan
- Libertad
- Ligaya (Poblacion)
- Liwanag (Poblacion)
- Liwayway (Poblacion)
- Malilico
- Mayha
- Panique
- Pato-o
- Poctoy
- Progreso Este
- Progreso Weste
- Rizal
- Tabing Dagat (Poblacion)
- Tabobo-an
- Tuburan
- Tumingad
- Tulay

=== Climate ===
Climate data for Odiongan, Romblon
Month	Jan	Feb	Mar	Apr	May	Jun	Jul	Aug	Sep	Oct	Nov	Dec	Year
Mean daily maximum °C (°F)	28 (82)	29 (84)	30 (86)	31 (88)	31 (88)	30 (86)	29 (84)	29 (84)	29 (84)	29 (84)	29 (84)	28 (82)	29 (85)
Mean daily minimum °C (°F)	21 (70)	21 (70)	22 (72)	23 (73)	25 (77)	25 (77)	25 (77)	25 (77)	25 (77)	24 (75)	23 (73)	22 (72)	23 (74)
Average precipitation mm (inches)	31 (1.2)	20 (0.8)	25 (1.0)	39 (1.5)	152 (6.0)	269 (10.6)	314 (12.4)	285 (11.2)	303 (11.9)	208 (8.2)	95 (3.7)	70 (2.8)	1,811 (71.3)
Average rainy days	9.5	7.1	9.0	11.3	21.0	25.7	28.1	26.5	27.3	24.6	16.5	12.1	218.7
Source: Meteoblue

== Demographics ==
Population census of Odiongan
Year	Pop.	±% p.a.
1903	8,323	—
1918	13,366	+3.21%
1939	16,628	+1.05%
1948	18,401	+1.13%
1960	22,859	+1.82%
1970	28,501	+2.23%
1975	30,198	+1.17%
1980	27,188	−2.08%
1990	32,498	+1.80%
1995	35,527	+1.68%
2000	39,069	+2.06%
2007	42,062	+1.02%
2010	43,676	+1.38%
2015	45,367	+0.73%
2020	49,284	+1.76%
2024	48,133	−0.57%
Source: Philippine Statistics Authority

According to the 2024 census, it has a population of 48,133 people, making it the most populous municipality in the province.

=== Language ===
Asi language is the native language of majority of the municipality's inhabitants, while Onhan is the medium of communication in southern barangays bordering Ferrol and Looc municipalities respectively.

=== Religion ===
Most of the town's inhabitants are devout Roman Catholic and Philippine Independent Church (Independent Catholic) adherents with a small population of Protestants, including PMCC (4th Watch), Baptists, Iglesia ni Cristo, Foursquare Gospel, Assemblies of God, Seventh-day Adventists, and Jehovah's Witnesses.

== Economy ==
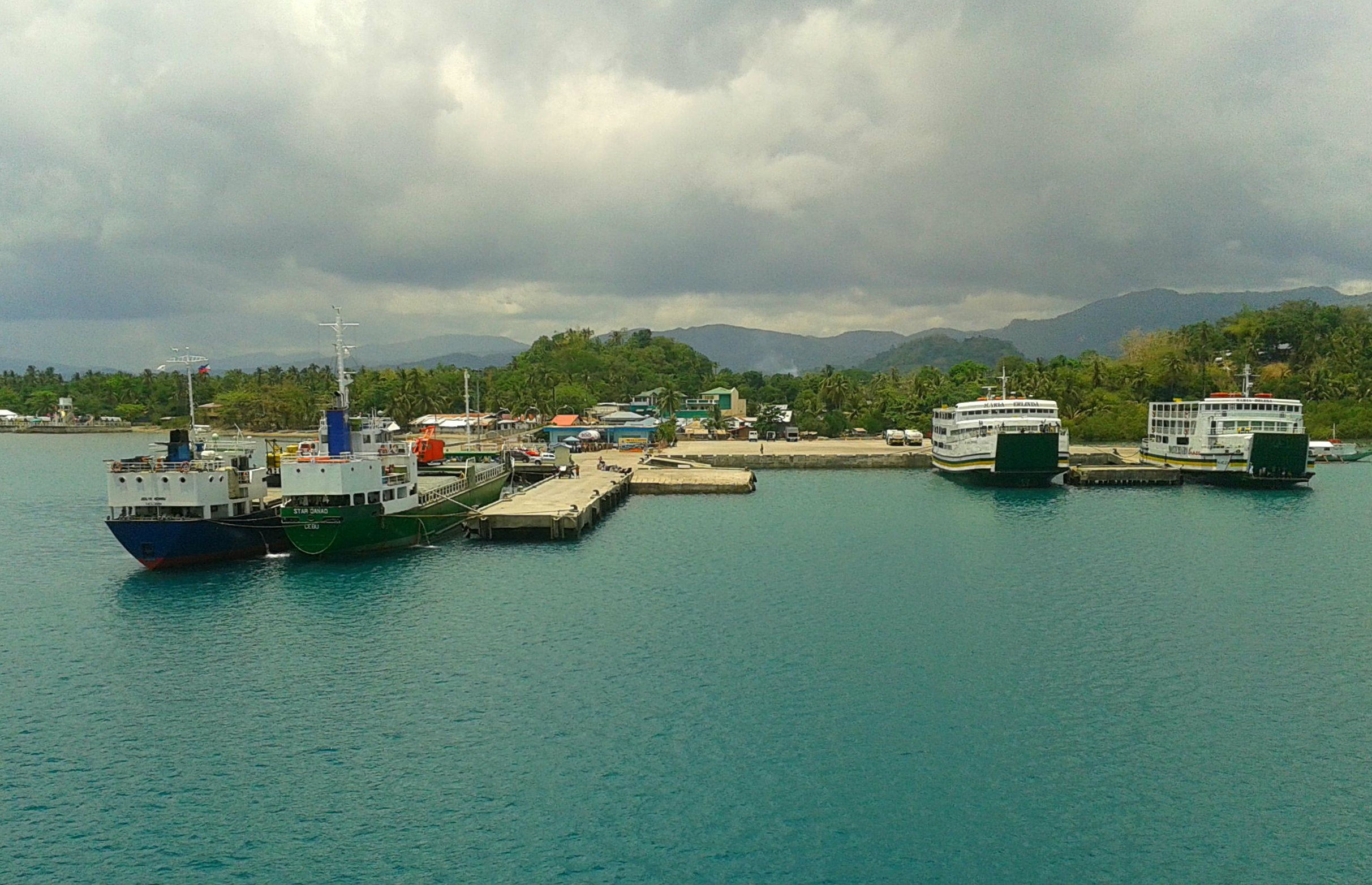
Poctoy Pier, the largest port in Romblon province

Poverty incidence of Odiongan (%)

Source: Philippine Statistics Authority

== Government ==
=== Local government ===
As a municipality in the Province of Romblon, government officials in the provincial level are voted by the electorates of the town. The provincial government have political jurisdiction over local transactions of the municipal government.

Pursuant to Chapter II, Title II, Book III of Republic Act 7160 or the Local Government Code of 1991, the municipal government is composed of a mayor (alkalde), a vice mayor (bise alkalde) and members (kagawad) of the legislative branch Sangguniang Bayan alongside a secretary to the said legislature, all of which are elected to a three-year term and are eligible to run for three consecutive terms. The incumbent mayor of Odiongan is Trina Alejandra Fabic y Firmalo y Que.The incumbent Vice Mayor Diven Fos Dimaala.

Barangays are also headed by elected officials: Barangay Captain, Barangay Council, whose members are called Barangay Councilors. The barangays have SK federation which represents the barangay, headed by SK chairperson and whose members are called SK councilors. All officials are also elected every three years.

== Education ==
There are two schools district offices which govern all educational institutions within the municipality including schools located in the municipality of Ferrol. They oversee the management and operations of all private and public, from primary to secondary schools. These are the:

- Odiongan North Schools District
- Odiongan South Schools District

=== Primary and elementary schools ===
- Amatong (Orlina) Elementary School
- Anahao Elementary School
- Aurora Elementary School
- Bangon Elementary School
- Boliganay Elementary School
- Budiong Elementary School
- Canduyong Elementary School
- Canlumay Cultural Central School
- Epiphany School of Peace and Goodwill-IFi Learning Institution
- Erhard Systems Technological Institute
- Gabawan Elementary School
- Gabawan SDA Multigrade School
- Libertad Elementary School
- Malilico Elementary School
- Maranatha Christian Academy
- Mayha Elementary School
- OBCCI Christian School
- Odiongan North Central School (Batiano)
- Odiongan SDA Elementary School
- Odiongan South Central Elementary School
- Palati Primary School
- Panique Elementary School
- Pato-o Elementary School
- Paulino F. Fabon Sr. Memorial School
- Poctoy-Baito Elementary School
- Progreso Este Elementary School
- Progreso Oste Elementary School
- Rizal Elementary School
- Tabobo-an Elementary School
- Tuburan Elementary School
- Tulay Elementary School
- Tumingad Elementary School
- Virginia Centurione Bracelli School

=== Secondary schools ===
- Adventist Mission Academy of Romblon
- Colegio de Tablas
- Gabawan National High School
- Libertad National High School
- Mayha National High School-Romblon National High School (Odiongan Ext)
- Odiongan National High School
- Philippine Science High School
- Romblon State University-Laboratory Science High School

== Notable personalities ==
- Renato Solidum Jr. – Secretary of DOST, 2022–present; Director of PHIVOLCS, 2003–2022
- Ephraim Fajutagana – twelfth Supreme Bishop of the Philippine Independent Church (2011–2017)
