= Tablas Island =

Island in the Philippines

Tablas
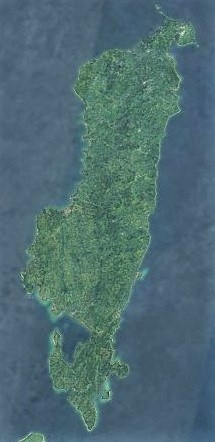
- Tablas island satellite image captured by Sentinel-2 in 2016

- Location within Philippines

Geography
- Coordinates: 12°24′19″N 122°3′51″E
- Archipelago: Romblon Group of Islands
- Adjacent to: Sibuyan Sea; Tablas Strait
- Area: 839.156 km^{2} (324.000 sq mi)
- Highest elevation: 665 m (2182 ft)
- Highest point: Tablas Peak

Administration
- Philippines
- Region: Mimaropa
- Province: Romblon
- Municipalities: List: Alcantara; Calatrava; Ferrol; Looc; Odiongan; San Agustin; San Andres; Santa Fe; Santa Maria
- Largest settlement: Odiongan (pop. 45,367)

Demographics
- Population: 164,012 (01 Aug 2015)

Additional information

Tablas is the largest island of the province of Romblon, Philippines.

Odiongan, on the west central coast of the island, is a major port and the largest municipality of Romblon in terms of population. Tablas is administratively subdivided into the municipalities of Alcantara, Calatrava, Ferrol, Looc, Odiongan, San Agustin, San Andres, Santa Fe, and Santa Maria.

== Etymology ==
The name Tablas is of Spanish origin. Before the Spanish period, the island was called Osigan, and the first colonial census recorded a population of 256 living in small villages.

== Geography ==
The island lies about 50 kilometres (31 mi) east from the southern part of Mindoro Island. The northern tip of Tablas is about 12 kilometres (7.5 mi) from Romblon Island. Mount Payaopao (also known as Tablas Summit on old maps) at the northeastern extremity of the island, is the highest peak on the island at 2,182 feet (665 m) high and the second highest in the province (after Mount Guiting-Guiting).

A wooded central range of hills traverses the length of Tablas. The west coast is formed by the western slope of the central mountain ridge, which is narrow and well defined. The summits in the middle of the island are 1,600 to 2,000 feet high. In the center of the island is Bitaogan Peak, 2,164 feet (660 m) high, which appears as a rounded knob from east and west and sharp from north and south. Mount Lunas, at the back of Looc Bay, is a black ridge 1,556 feet (474 m) high, long and rounded from east and west and sharp from north and south; with it the range breaks off to the low pass from Looc Bay to the town of Alcantara on the east coast. The southern part of Tablas is a group of many sharp conical hills, all bare and grassy except Malbug Hill, 904 feet (276 m) high, and Calaton Point, 835 feet (255 m) high, on the east coast, which are dark and wooded. The shore line is largely mangrove, with many beaches of coral sand and some limestone cliffs. The shore reef is continuous except off Guinauayan Point.

There is no good natural harbor except Looc Bay, a large indentation on the west side, but sheltered anchorage may be found on either side of the island, according to the season of the year.

Cabalian Point, the southern extremity of Tablas Island, is low and sandy and hard to distinguish at night, a lighthouse was built during the American Colonial period.

== Education ==
Romblon State University is a premier institution for higher education in the Mimaropa Region. The University has a large campus in Odiongan town and a few more around Romblon province.

== Economy ==
Main occupations are fruit and vegetable farming, fisheries, farm animal breeding and fishing. Tablas is one of largest producers of pili nuts. Wax was produced in this island.

Tablas was established an economic zone, Tablas Economic Zone Inc. (TEZI), on 2015 under the powers of the Philippine Economic Zone Authority (PEZA) and the Department of Trade and Industry (DTI)

== Language ==
The Asi language is a Visayan language spoken, along with the Romblomanon and Onhan languages, in the province of Romblon, Philippines. Tagalog is spoken by the locals as the second language. Foreigners are a welcome diversion for college students, who are the main part of the population who can speak English.

== Wildlife ==
The wildlife and landscape appears untouched as deep-green vegetation is crossed by rivers and streams. A portion of the native forest cover was cleared and converted to coconut plantations and rough grazing. However, the remaining small areas of watershed forest support several species of wildlife endemic to Tablas as well as Romblon Island. These include the Tablas fantail (Rhipidura sauli), the Tablas drongo (Dicrurus menagei), the Romblon hawk owl (Ninox spilonota), and the Tablas bulbul (Hypsipetes (siquijorensis) cinereiceps). The frogs Platymantis-lawtoni and the smooth-skinned forest frog (Platymantis levigatus) are endangered species endemic to Tablas and other islands of Romblon province. In Ferrol at Malcom's Cove, monkeys, sea turtles and the Philippine eagle are found. In Santa Fe, the whale shark (the earth's largest fish) is known to breed. The waters off Looc teem with numerous species of tropical fish and sea life in the protected sanctuary. Binucot Beach has manatee, dolphin and sea turtles.

== Scuba Diving ==
The only known blue hole in the Philippines is the Tablas Island Blue Hole, located just off northwest Gorda Point in northeastern Tablas, below the Gorda Point Lighthouse.

== Access ==
=== By water ===
Access to Tablas is usually by ferry from the Port of Batangas City in southern Luzon and disembarking at the Port of Odiongan in Barangay Poctoy.

Montenegro Lines serves Odiongan from the Port of Batangas City everyday with Roll-on/roll-off vessels. Travel time from Batangas to Poctoy takes about 8–10 hours. Travel time from Poctoy Pier to Odiongan town is about 10 minutes by motorcycles. Tricycles are also readily available.

From Caticlan (Sambiray Dock or Tabon plaza) there is pump boats every day leaving around 10 - 11 heading for Santa fe. Leaves Santa fe at 7:30 in the morning. Travel time about 2h depending on sea condition. there is also another pump boat (Boat name: SANOY, phone number to captain +639126356955) going from Tablas south tip (Tabugon) to Caticlan almost every day in the morning, leaves Tabugon around 8 in the morning and goes back from Caticlan (Sambiray Dock or Tabon Plaza) to Tablas around 10 - 11. Price for one way trip 200php. When low tide in Tablas there is a smaller boat (flat boat) sending passengers between the beach and the boat for 10php per passenger.

=== By air ===
The main commercial airport of the province of Romblon is Tugdan Airport (IATA: TBH – ICAO: RPVU) located in the southeastern coast of Tablas in Barangay Tugdan, in the town of Alcantara.

From Manila, Philippine Airlines (PAL) serves Tugdan three times a week. Beginning February 2017, Cebu Pacific started flying from Manila to Tablas four times weekly - Monday, Wednesday, Friday, and Sunday, using ATR 72-600 aircraft.

== Images ==
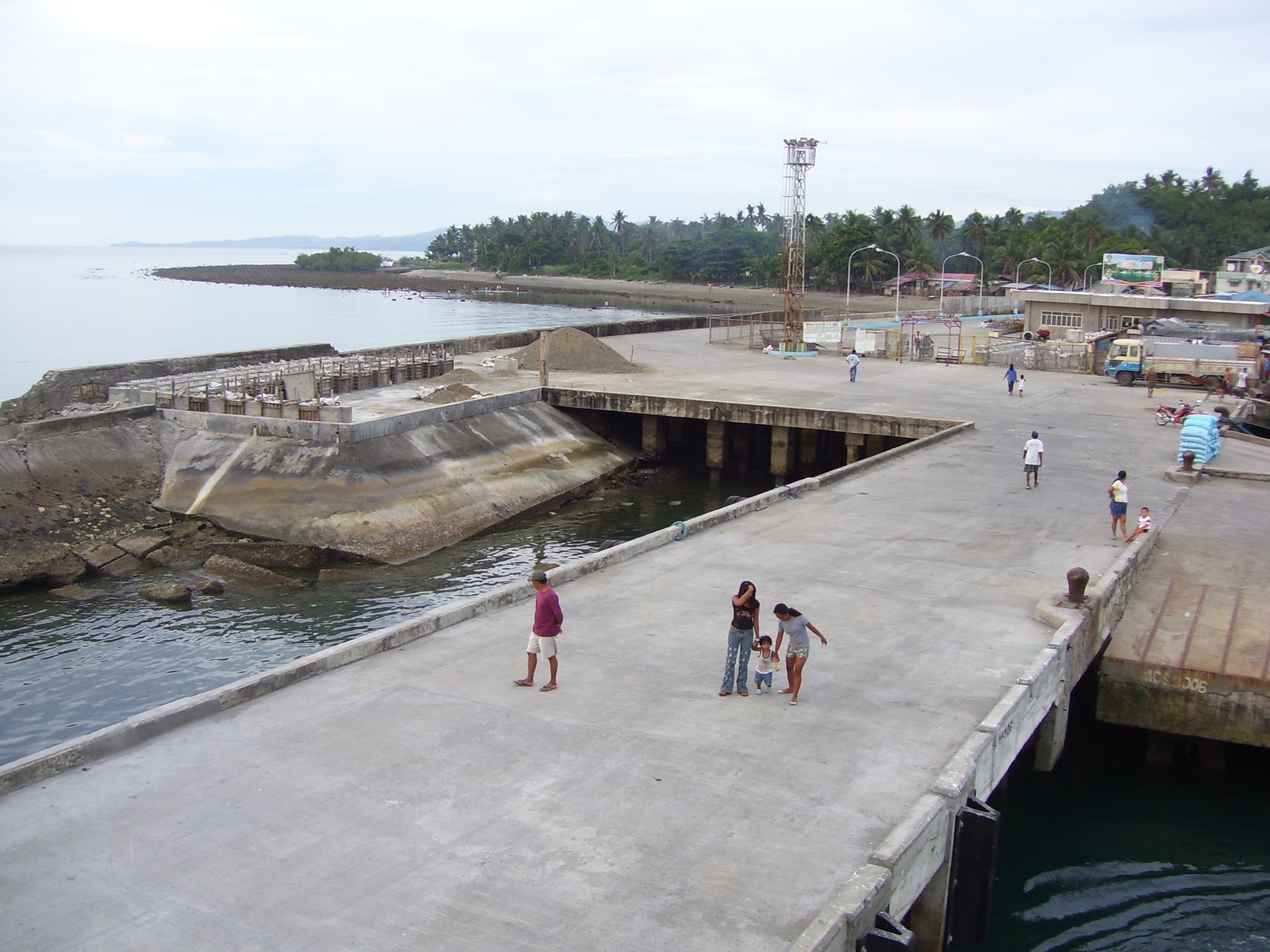
Poctoy Pier, Tablas Island, 2008

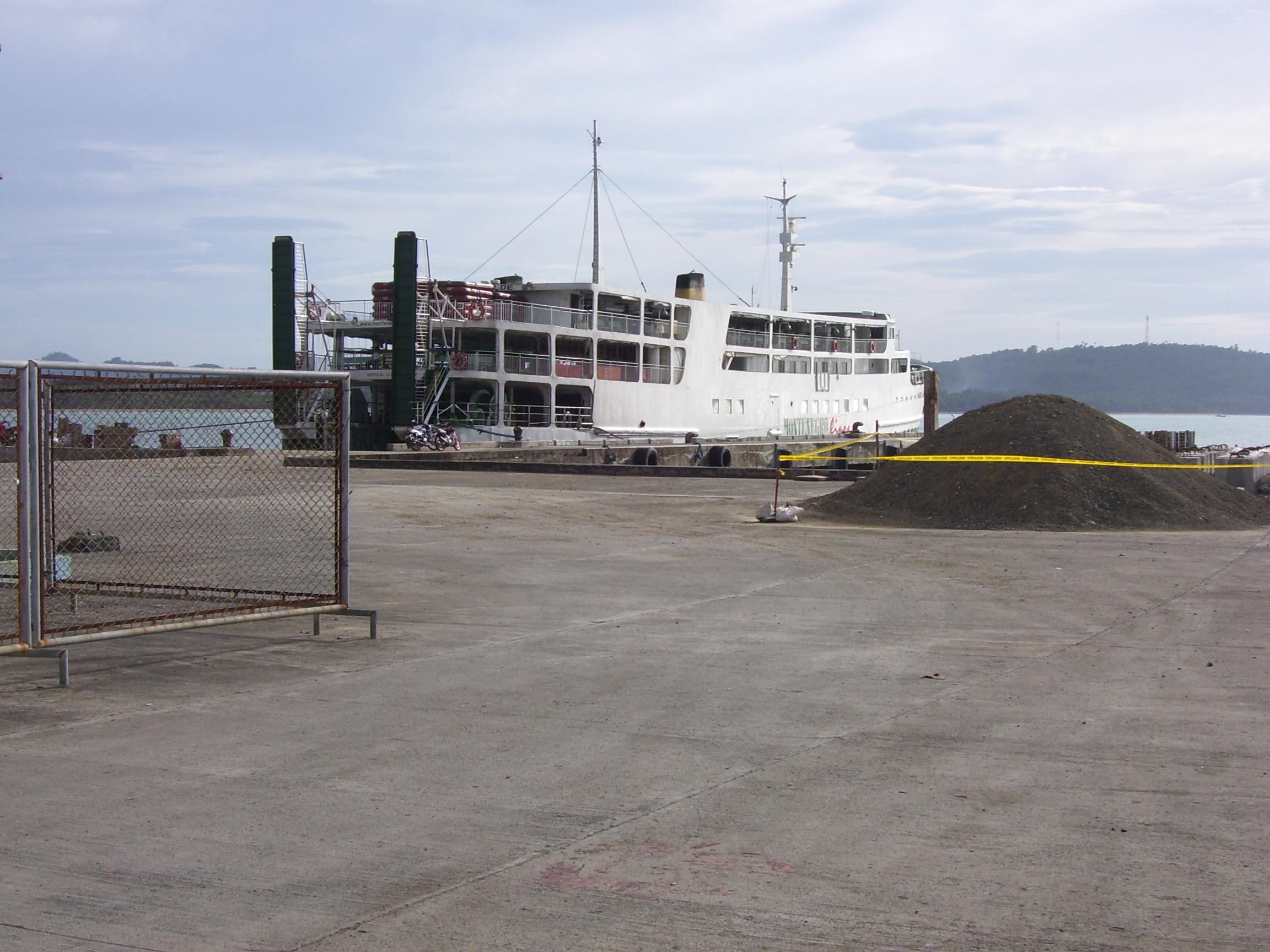
MV Maria Matilda at Poctoy Pier, Odiongan, Tablas Island 2008

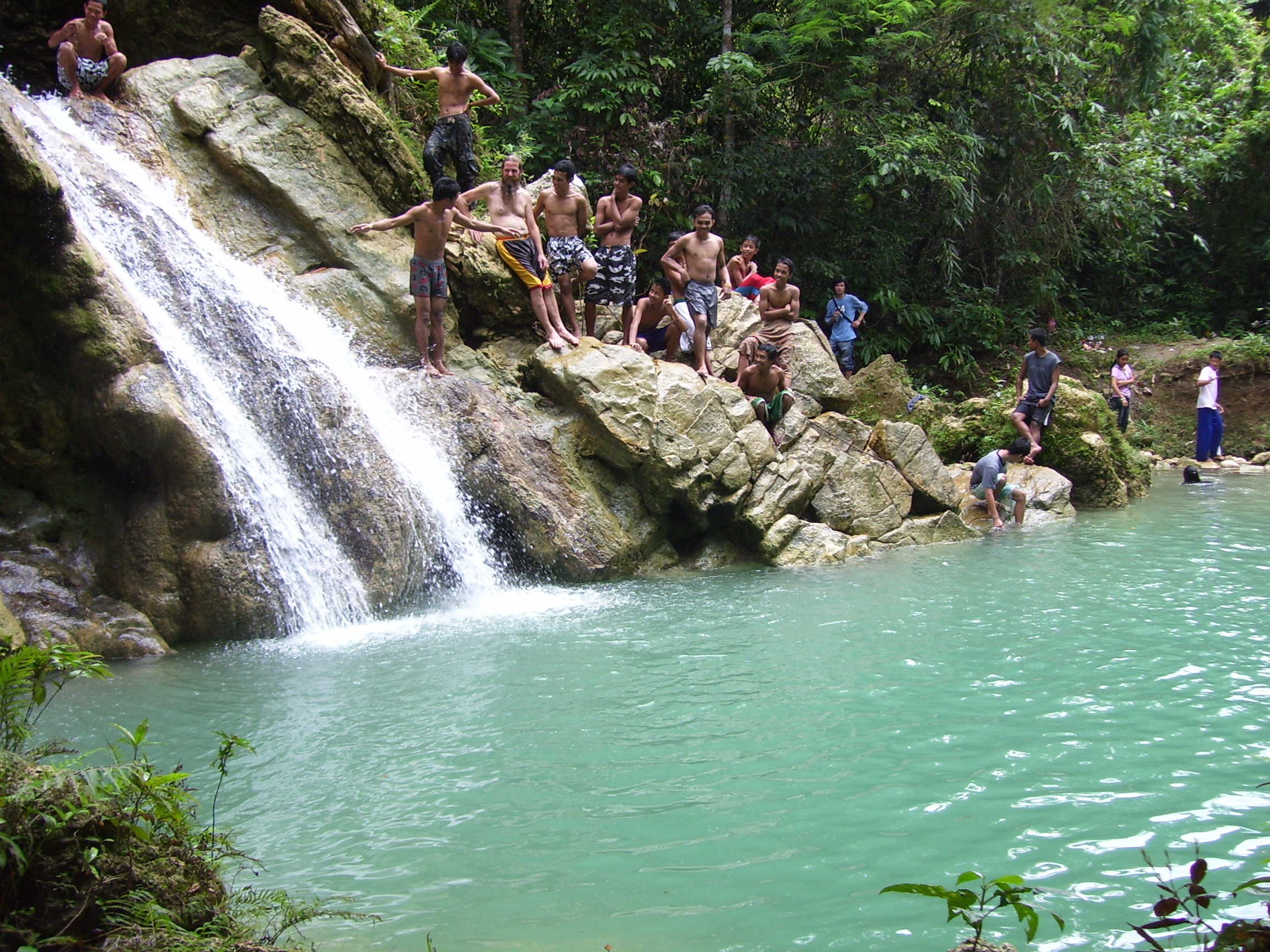
Mainit Falls, Tablas Island, 2008
