= Gorda Point Lighthouse =

Historic lighthouse in Romblon, Philippines

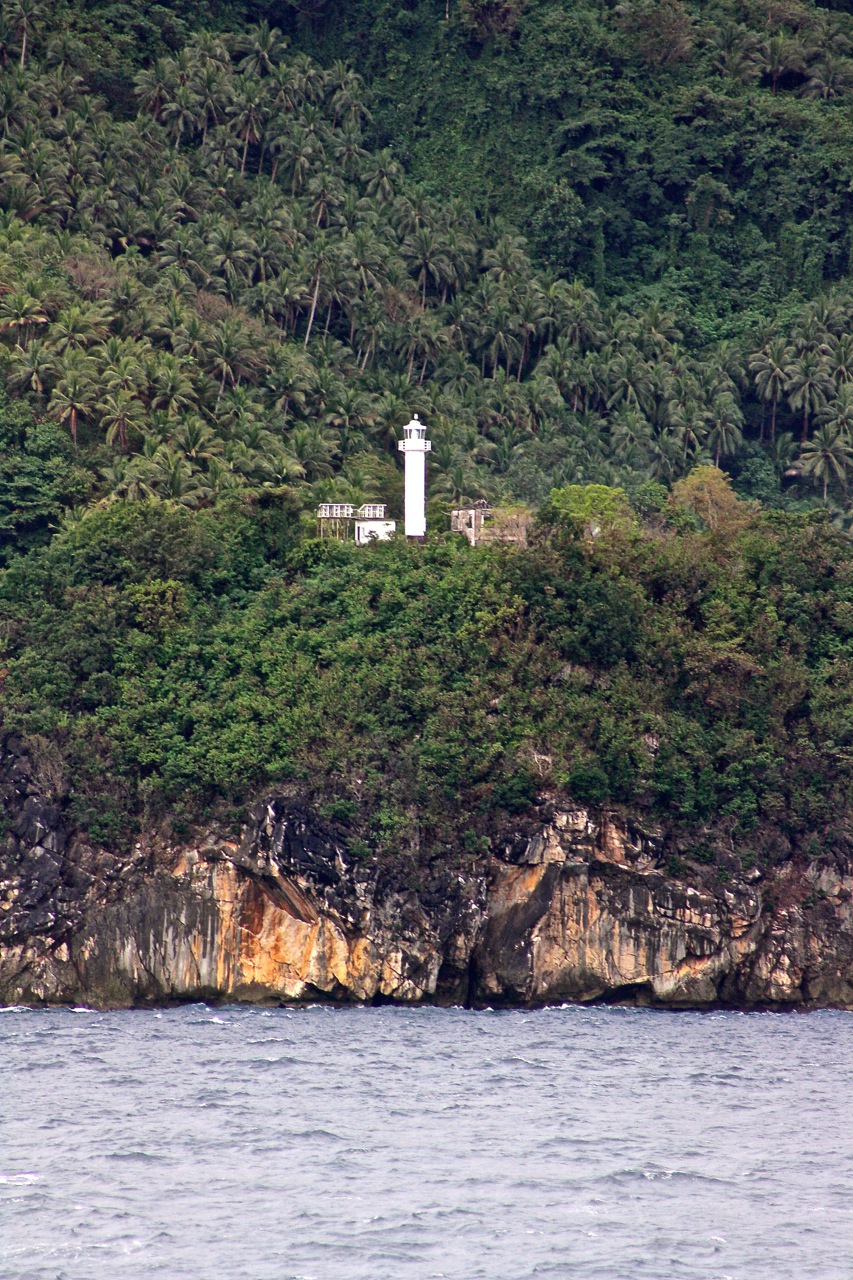
- The lighthouse in December 2014
- Location: Barangay Cawayan, San Agustin, Romblon, Philippines
- Coordinates: 12°39′35″N 122°09′12″E

Tower
- Constructed: 1930
- Construction: Concrete
- Automated: 1994
- Height: 19 m (62 ft)
- Shape: Round
- Markings: White tower and lantern
- Power source: solar power

Light
- First lit: 1930
- Focal height: 65 m (213 ft)
- Lens: Fourth-order Fresnel lens
- Range: 32.18 km (17.38 nmi)
- Characteristic: Fl (3) W 15s.

Gorda Point Lighthouse (Filipino: Parola ng Punta Gorda), is a historic lighthouse located about 248 kilometers (154 mi) southeast of Manila in Barangay Cawayan, San Agustin, Romblon, Philippines. It serves as a guide for ships traversing the Romblon Pass between the islands of Tablas and Romblon.

== History ==
Gorda Point Lighthouse is one of several lighthouses constructed in the Philippines in the 1930s during the American colonial period. It was built atop a promontory at Gorda Point, on the northeast tip of Tablas Island, in Barangay Cawayan in San Agustin, Romblon. It serves as a guiding light for maritime vessels traversing the Romblon Pass between the islands of Tablas and Romblon. A keeper's dwelling was also constructed beside the lighthouse to provide accommodation for the lighthouse keeper. The original lighthouse was a 65 meters (213 ft) steel tower painted white with a light that shows three white flashes and one red flash every 20 seconds.

In 1954, during the administration of Philippine President Ramon Magsaysay, Philippine Congress passed Republic Act No. 1144, appropriating funds of PH₱10,000 for the construction of a new keeper's dwelling at the lighthouse.

Between October 1993 to November 1994, the lighthouse underwent rehabilitation and modernization as part of the 37 lighthouses rehabilitated under the Maritime Safety Improvement Project of the Department of Transportation, Maritime Industry Authority and the Philippine Coast Guard. The project, which was funded through a JP¥3.507 billion loan from the Japan International Cooperation Agency, saw the construction of a new 19 metres (62 ft) concrete tower and a light the runs on solar power.

Sometime between 1994 and 2015, the lighthouse was damaged by inclement weather and became inoperable. On 7 May 2015, the Philippine Coast Guard, in a Notice to Mariners on its website, announced that the lighthouse had been restored into normal operation on 16 April 2015, with the light now showing three white flashes every 15 seconds.

The lighthouse is located near the Tablas Island Blue Hole, the only known blue hole in the Philippines.

== See also ==
- Lighthouses in the Philippines
