= Ferrol, Romblon =

Municipality in Romblon, Philippines

Ferrol
- Municipality
- Municipality of Ferrol
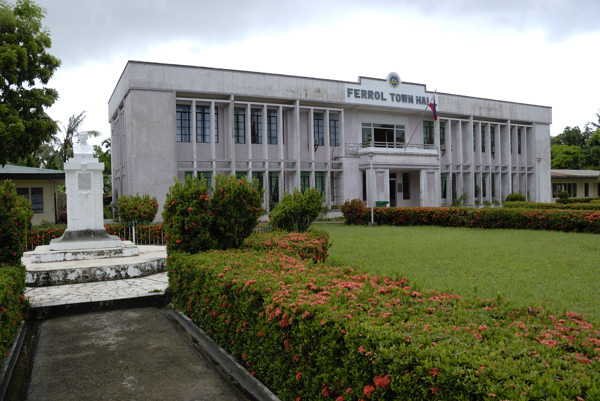
- Municipal Hall

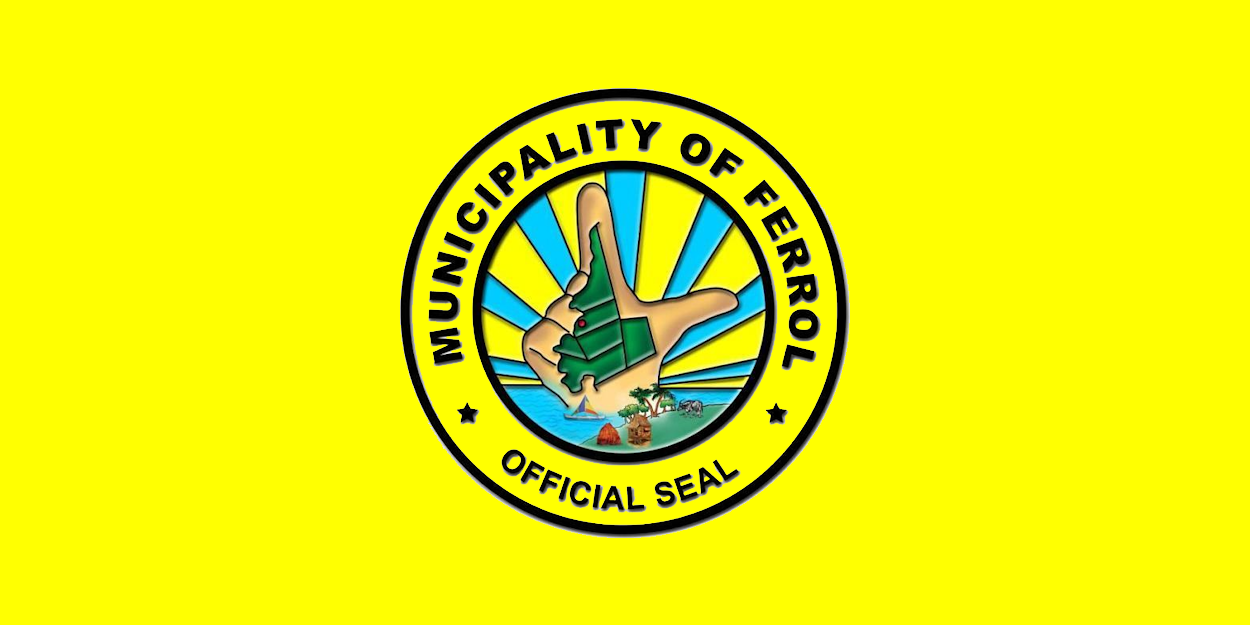
- Flag

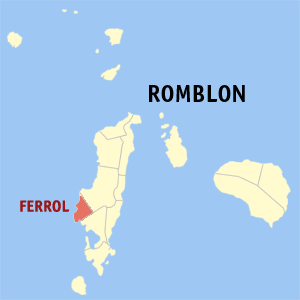
- Map of Romblon with Ferrol highlighted
- Interactive map of Ferrol
- Location within the Philippines
- Coordinates: 12°20′18″N 121°56′19″E
- Country: Philippines
- Region: Mimaropa
- Province: Romblon
- District: Lone district
- Founded: 1850
- Incorporated: 1978
- Barangays: 6 (see Barangays)

Government
  - Type: Sangguniang Bayan
  - Mayor: Christian "Pongpong" L. Gervacio
  - Vice Mayor: Joenan S. Sarmiento
  - Representative: Eleandro Jesus F. Madrona
  - Councilors: Boyet Dalisay; Kano Patnon; Aizner Claud; Bheng Prado; Nhiesel Gregorio-Teologo; Nonito Blancia; Victor Rufon; Yman Fabila
  - Electorate: 5,410 voters (2025)

Area
  - Total: 26.72 km^{2} (10.32 sq mi)
- Elevation: 31 m (102 ft)
- Highest elevation: 622 m (2,041 ft)
- Lowest elevation: 0 m (0 ft)

Population (2024 census)
  - Total: 7,826
  - Density: 292.9/km^{2} (758.6/sq mi)
  - Households: 1,999

Economy
  - Income class: 5th municipal income class
  - Poverty incidence: 42.07% (2023)
  - Revenue: ₱ 77.33 million (2024)
  - Assets: ₱ 25.34 million (2024)
  - Expenditure: ₱ 58.18 million (2024)
  - Liabilities: ₱ 34.09 million (2024)

Service provider
  - Electricity: Tablas Island Electric Cooperative (TIELCO)
- Time zone: UTC+8 (PST)
- ZIP code: 5506
- PSGC: 1705916000
- IDD : area code: +63 (0)42
- Native languages: Onhan; Tagalog

Ferrol, officially the Municipality of Ferrol, is a municipality in the province of Romblon, Philippines. According to the 2024 census, it has a population of 7,826 people.

== History ==
Ferrol was established in 1850 as a barrio of Odiongan by the Spanish colonial authorities. They discovered the place 10 kilometers south-west after repulsing and chasing a convoy of Muslim pirates that attacked Odiongan. The Spaniards noticed the resemblance of the bay of the vicinity similar to that of Ferrol, Spain, which is the home port of Spain's Maritime Department of the North; hence the town's name.

In 1978, in order to consolidate the Onhan-speaking barangays of Odiongan into one municipality, Assemblyman Nemesio Ganan Jr. authored a bill in the Congress of the Philippines which created Ferrol, together with the barangays of Agnocnoc, Bunsoran, Hinagoman, Tubigon, and Claro M. Recto into a new municipality. On 11 June 1978, Ferrol formally became the 16th municipality in Romblon by virtue of Presidential Decree No. 1492, signed by President Ferdinand Marcos.

== Geography ==
Ferrol is located on Tablas Island. It is bounded on the north by Odiongan, on the west by the Tablas Strait, on the east by Santa Maria, and on the south by Looc. It has a total land area of 26.72 km^{2}.

=== Barangays ===
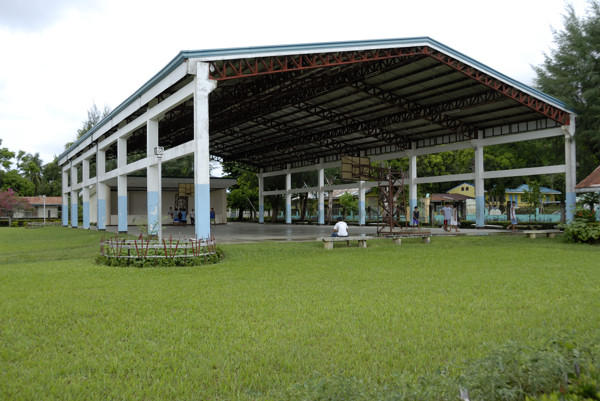
Ferrol town plaza and covered court

Ferrol is politically subdivided into 6 barangays. Each barangay consists of puroks and some have sitios.

- Agnonoc
- Bunsoran
- Claro M. Recto
- Poblacion
- Hinaguman
- Tubigon

=== Climate ===
Climate data for Ferrol, Romblon
Month	Jan	Feb	Mar	Apr	May	Jun	Jul	Aug	Sep	Oct	Nov	Dec	Year
Mean daily maximum °C (°F)	28 (82)	29 (84)	30 (86)	31 (88)	31 (88)	30 (86)	29 (84)	29 (84)	29 (84)	29 (84)	29 (84)	28 (82)	29 (85)
Mean daily minimum °C (°F)	21 (70)	21 (70)	22 (72)	23 (73)	25 (77)	25 (77)	25 (77)	25 (77)	25 (77)	24 (75)	23 (73)	22 (72)	23 (74)
Average precipitation mm (inches)	31 (1.2)	20 (0.8)	25 (1.0)	39 (1.5)	152 (6.0)	269 (10.6)	314 (12.4)	285 (11.2)	303 (11.9)	208 (8.2)	95 (3.7)	70 (2.8)	1,811 (71.3)
Average rainy days	9.5	7.1	9.0	11.3	21.0	25.7	28.1	26.5	27.3	24.6	16.5	12.1	218.7
Source: Meteoblue

== Demographics ==
Population census of Ferrol
Year	Pop.	±% p.a.
1980	4,840	—
1990	5,621	+1.51%
1995	5,772	+0.50%
2000	5,924	+0.56%
2007	6,395	+1.06%
2010	6,802	+2.27%
2015	6,964	+0.45%
2020	8,005	+2.98%
2024	7,826	−0.54%
Source: Philippine Statistics Authority

According to the 2024 census, it has a population of 7,826 people.

=== Language ===
Onhan, together with Tagalog, Hiligaynon, and English, is the medium of communication in business and trade.

== Economy ==
Poverty incidence of Ferrol (%)

Source: Philippine Statistics Authority

Ferrol has the highest level of vegetable production in Romblon. Livestock and rice farming are also present in the coastal areas which is mostly for home consumption and grown in small scale. Other economic opportunities include copra farming, fish cultivation, agricultural manufacturing and retail, and tourism. The Tablas Island Electric cooperative supplies 41.78% of households in Ferrol with electricity. As for water supply, the town has a Level 3 water supply system and a Level 4 irrigation system with 75 service areas.

Landline and cellular phone services from PLDT, Smart, and Globe are already available in Ferrol. The town is connected to nearby Odiongan and other municipalities through the Tablas Circumferential Road. Jeepneys and tricycles are the common form of land transportation. A port in Barangay Agnocnoc caters to intra-provincial travel and fishing vessels.

== Tourist attractions and transport ==
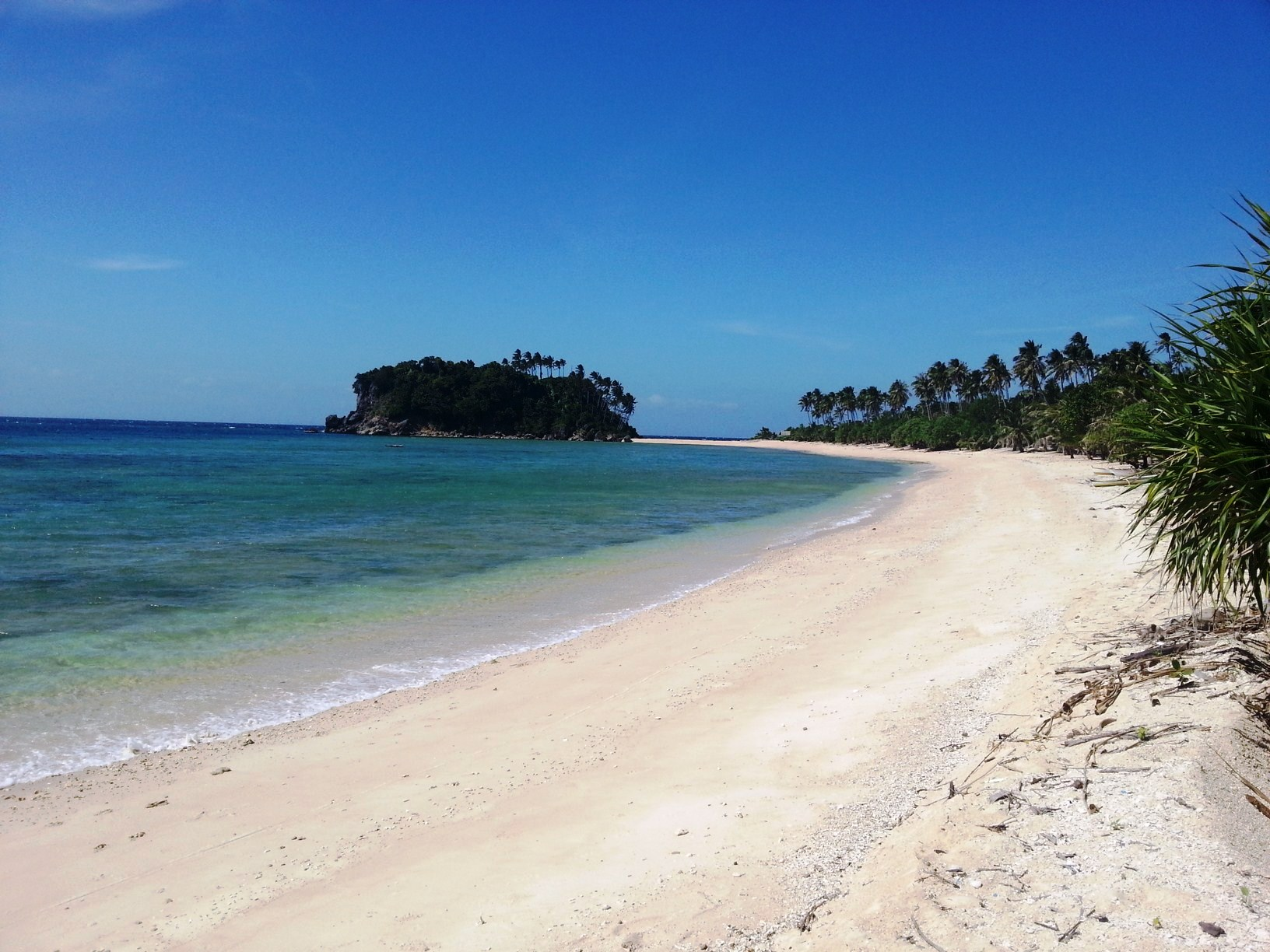
Binucot Beach

Beaches near Ferrol include Binucot, Atabay and Guin-awayan beaches. Caves the Mabaho and Burobintana caves. The town is accessible via Odiongan by RORO vessels from Batangas City or Roxas, Oriental Mindoro. It is also accessible via Tugdan Airport in Alcantara town, where Cebu Pacific has flights from Manila four times weekly.

== Government ==
=== Local government ===
As a municipality in the Province of Romblon, government officials in the provincial level are voted by the electorates of the town. The provincial government have political jurisdiction over local transactions of the municipal government.

Pursuant to Chapter II, Title II, Book III of Republic Act 7160 or the Local Government Code of 1991, the municipal government is composed of a mayor (alkalde), a vice mayor (bise alkalde) and members (kagawad) of the legislative branch Sangguniang Bayan alongside a secretary to the said legislature, all of which are elected to a three-year term and are eligible to run for three consecutive terms.

Barangays are also headed by elected officials: Barangay Captain, Barangay Council, whose members are called Barangay Councilors. The barangays have SK federation which represents the barangay, headed by SK chairperson and whose members are called SK councilors. All officials are also elected every three years.

=== Elected officials ===
Jovencio "Jun" Mayor, Jr. and Antonio Compas of the PDP–Laban, are the incumbent mayor and vice mayor of Ferrol as of 30 June 2019.

== Education ==
The Odiongan South Schools District Office governs all educational institutions within the municipality. It oversees the management and operations of all private and public, from primary to secondary schools.

=== Primary and elementary schools ===
- Agnocnoc Elementary School
- Bunsoran Elementary School
- Claro M. Recto Elementary School
- Ferrol Central Elementary School
- Hinag-oman Elementary School
- Tubigon Elementary School

=== Secondary school ===
- Ferrol National High School
