= Tablas Island Blue Hole =

Marine sinkhole

- Interactive map of Tablas Island Blue Hole
- Location: Just off northwest Gorda Point in northeastern Tablas, below the Gorda Point Lighthouse
- Coordinates: 12.6608098°N 122.1518°E
- Depth: 30 m (98 ft)
- Elevation: Entrance is about 5 m (16 ft) deep

The Tablas Island Blue Hole is an underwater sinkhole located off northeast Tablas Island below the Gorda Point Lighthouse, a historic lighthouse located about 248 kilometers (154 mi) southeast of Manila in Barangay Cawayan, San Agustin, Romblon, Philippines.

== Description ==
It is a vertical chimney about 8 metres (26 ft) in diameter, and is the only known blue hole in the Philippines. With an entrance in shallow water, it is possible to free-dive into the top part of the hole. The bottom of the hole is at a depth of about 30 meters.
