= Romblon =

Province in Mimaropa, Philippines

- Province
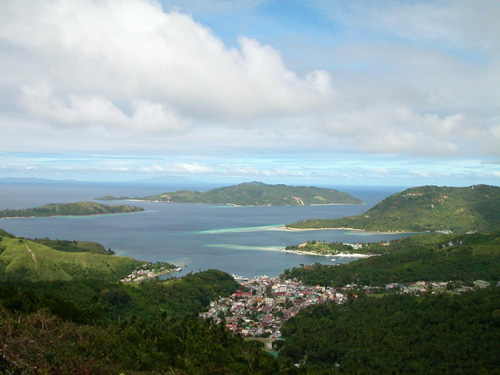
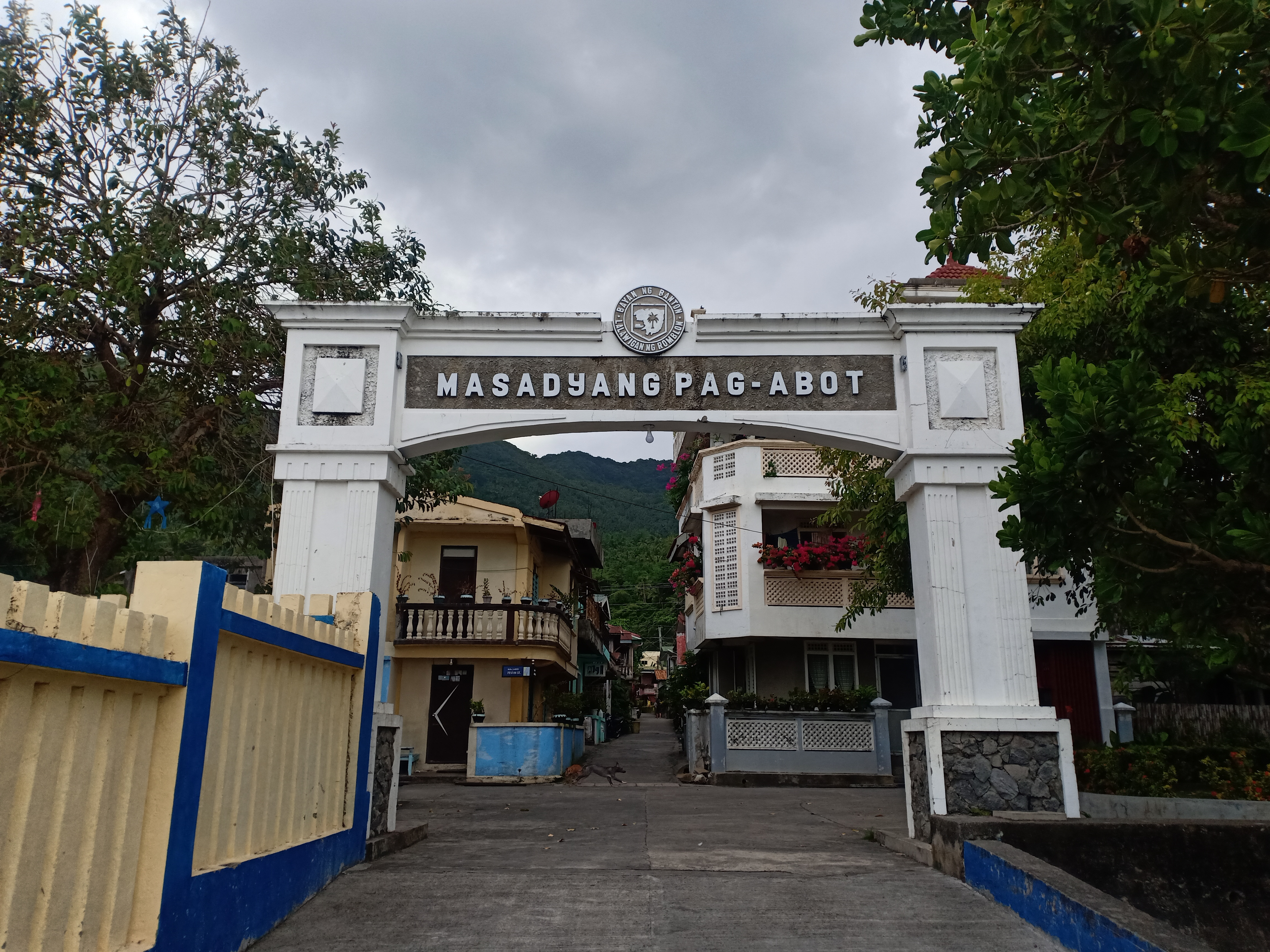
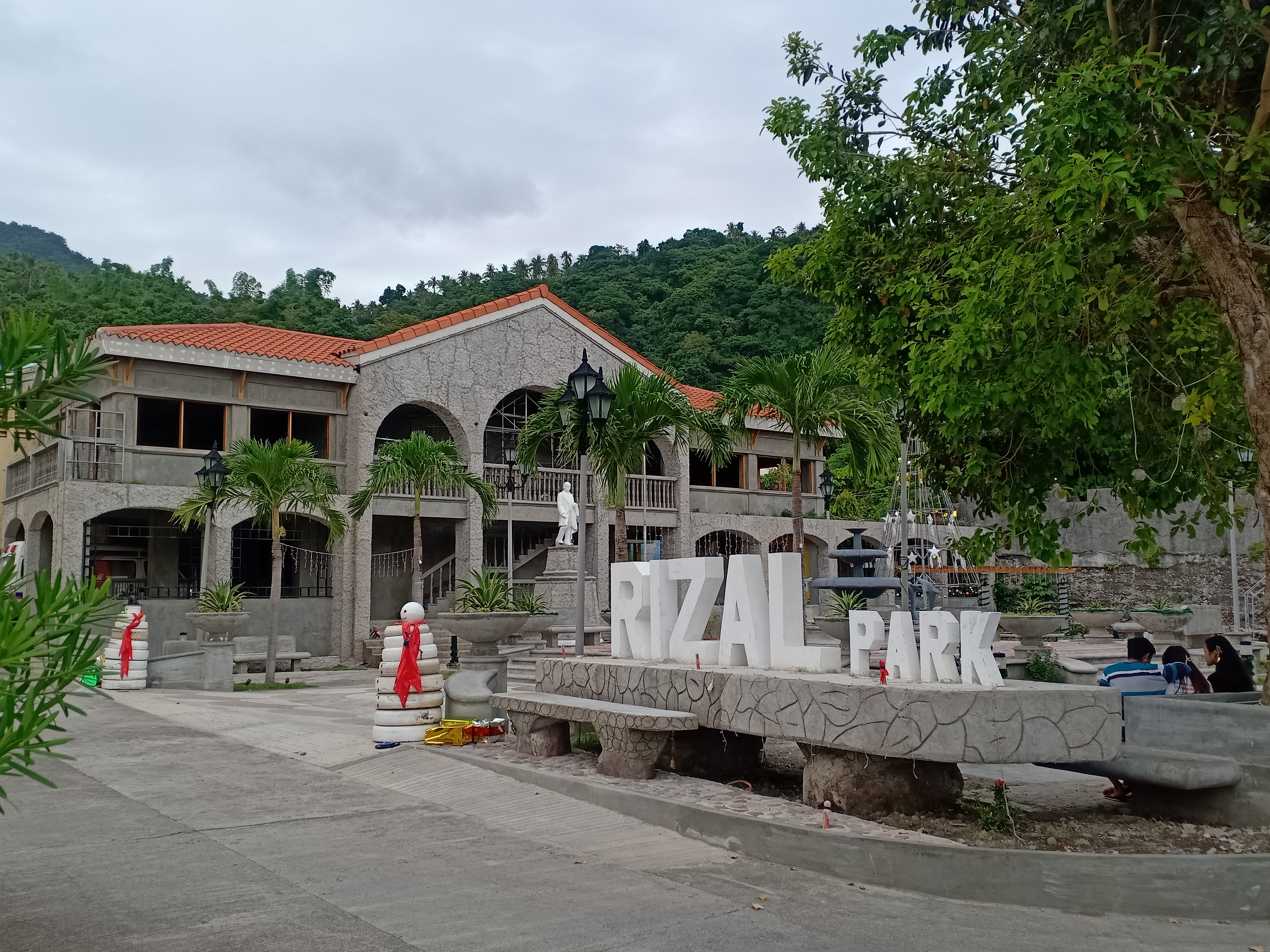
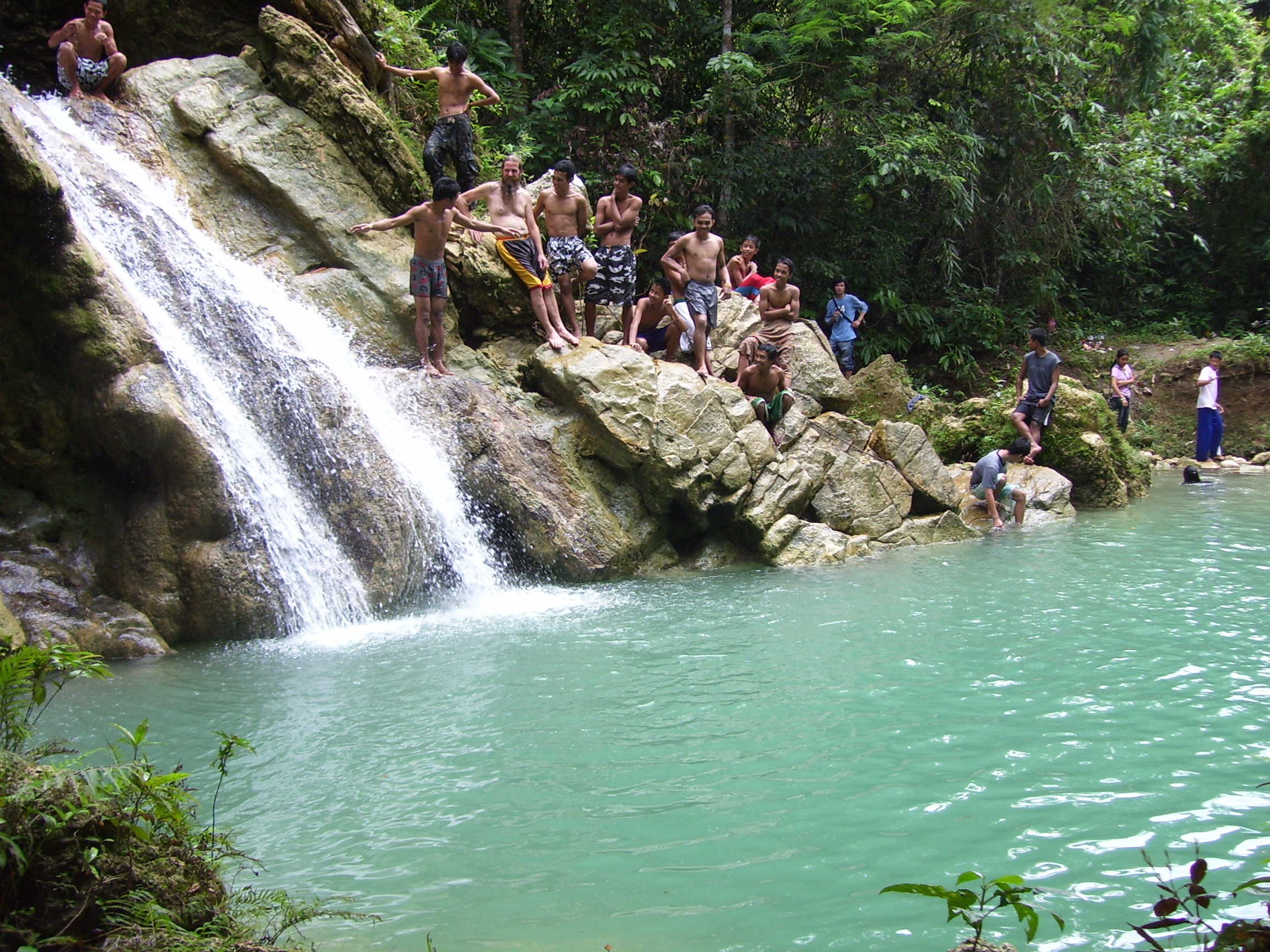
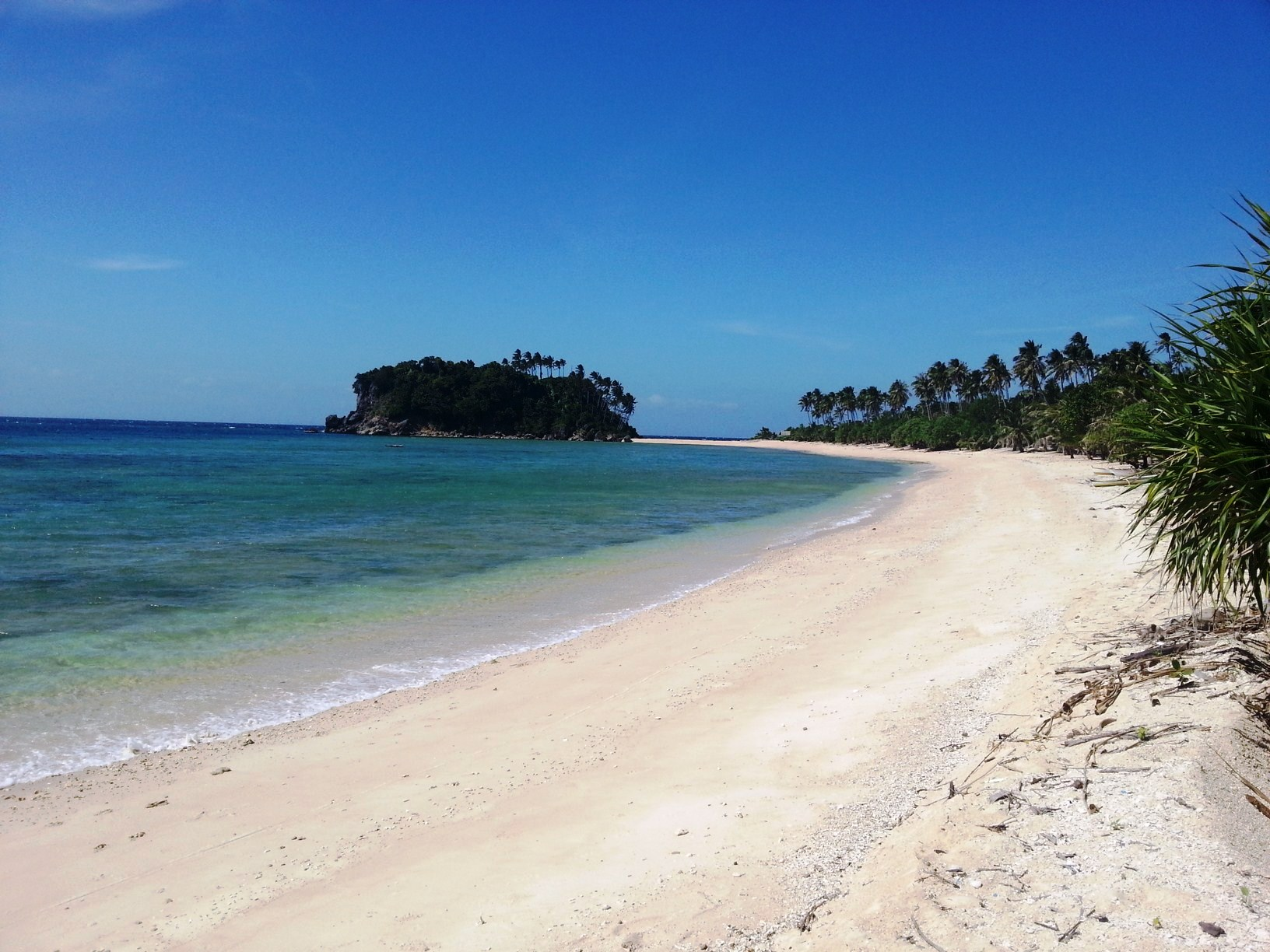
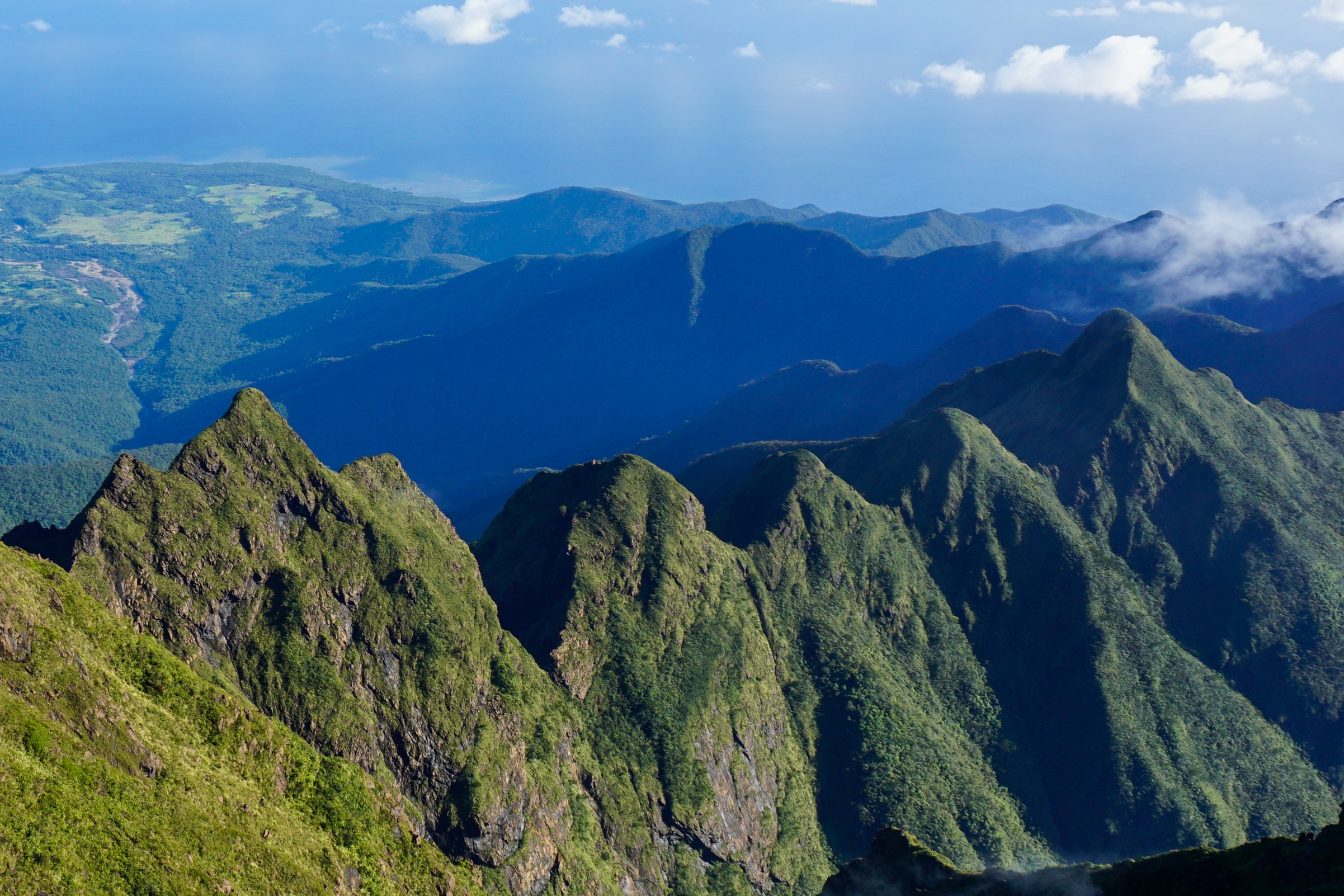
- From top, left to right: Romblon Bay and town, Banton Arch, Rizal Park in Banton, Mainit Falls in Odiongan, Binucot Beach in Ferrol and Mount Guiting-Guiting.

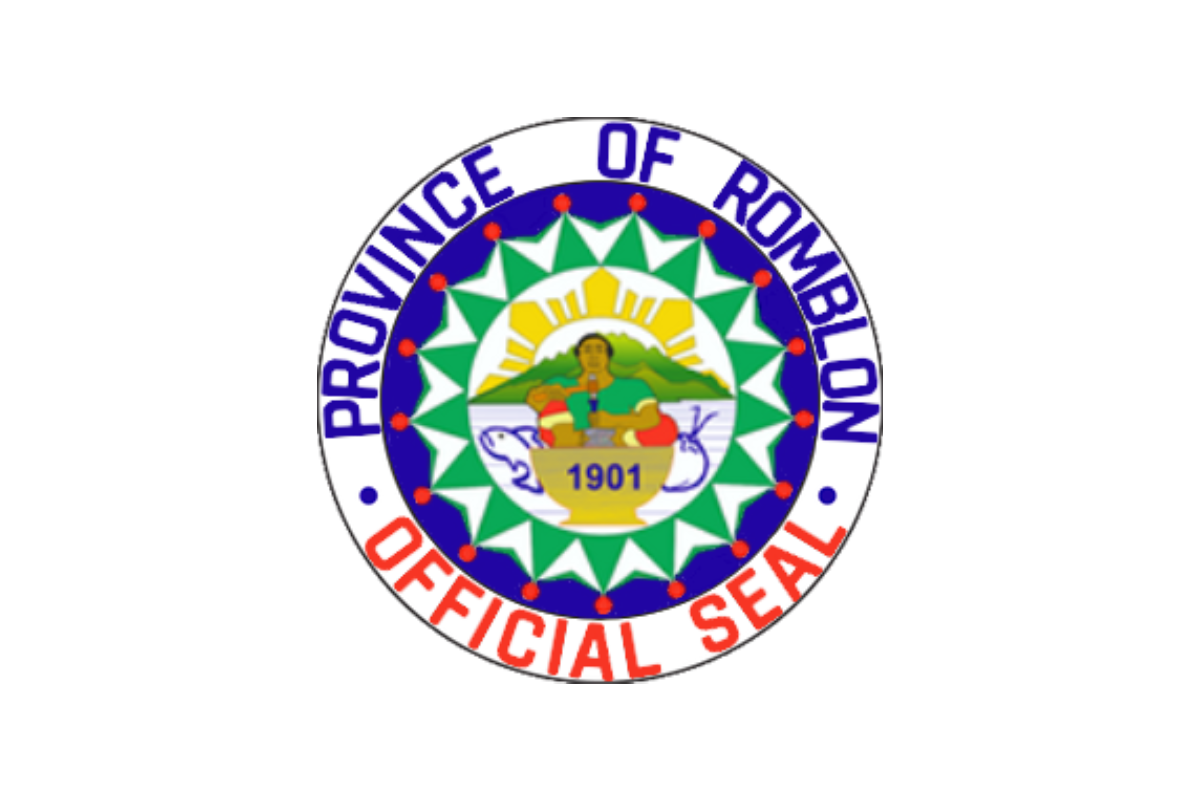
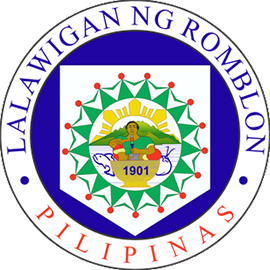
- Flag Seal
- Nickname: Marble Capital of the Philippines
- Anthem: Sulong Romblon
- Location in the Philippines
- Interactive map of Romblon
- Coordinates: 12°33′N 122°17′E
- Country: Philippines
- Region: Mimaropa
- Founded: 16 March 1901
- First annexation to Capiz: 2 July 1907
- Reestablished: 22 February 1918
- Second annexation to Capiz: 30 September 1942
- Restored: 1 October 1946
- Capital: Romblon
- Largest Municipality: Odiongan

Government
  - Type: Sangguniang Panlalawigan
  - Governor: Trina Alejandra Q. Firmalo-Fabic (LP)
  - Vice Governor: Armando Gutierrez (PFP)
  - Representative: Eleandro Jesus F. Madrona (NP)
  - Legislature: Romblon Provincial Board
  - Electorate: 211,336 voters (2025)

Area
  - Total: 1,533.45 km^{2} (592.07 sq mi)
  - Rank: 68th out of 82
- Highest elevation (Guiting-Guiting): 2,058 m (6,752 ft)

Population (2024 census)
  - Total: 302,824
  - Rank: 66th out of 82
  - Density: 197.479/km^{2} (511.468/sq mi)
  - Rank: 46th out of 82
  - Households: 77,639
- Demonyms: Romblomanon; Romblonense

Divisions
  - Independent cities: 0
  - Component cities: 0
  - Municipalities: 17: Alcantara; Banton; Cajidiocan; Calatrava; Concepcion; Corcuera; Ferrol; Looc; Magdiwang; Odiongan; Romblon; San Agustin; San Andres; San Fernando; San Jose; Santa Fe; Santa Maria
  - Barangays: 219
  - Districts: Legislative district of Romblon

Economy
  - Income class: 2nd provincial income class
  - Poverty incidence: 23% (2023)
  - Revenue: ₱ 1,546 million (2024)
  - Assets: ₱ 4,736 million (2024)
  - Expenditure: ₱ 1,216 million (2024)
  - Liabilities: ₱ 753 million (2024)
- Time zone: UTC+08:00 (PHT)
- PSGC: 175900000
- IDD : area code: +63 (0)42
- ISO 3166 code: PH-ROM
- Spoken languages: Romblomanon; Onhan; Asi; Hiligaynon; Tagalog; English

Romblon (/rɒmˈbloʊn/, rom-BLOHN, Tagalog: [ɾomˈblon]), officially the Province of Romblon (Filipino: Lalawingan/Probinsya ng Romblon), is an archipelagic province of the Philippines located in the Mimaropa region. Its main components include Romblon, an archipelagic municipality of the same name that also serves as the provincial capital; Tablas, the largest island, covering nine municipalities (including Odiongan, the largest municipality in the province); Sibuyan with its three towns; as well as the smaller island municipalities of Corcuera, Banton, Concepcion, and San Jose. The province lies south of Marinduque and Quezon, east of Oriental Mindoro, north of Aklan and Capiz, and west of Masbate. According to the 2020 census, it has a total population of 308,985.

Romblon was inhabited by aboriginal Filipinos prior to the arrival of the Spanish in 1569. Archaeological artifacts recovered by the National Museum in 1936 indicate that the aborigines of Romblon had a rich and advanced culture. During Spanish colonial rule, Romblon was initially administered under the province of Arevalo (Iloilo) until 1716, when it was transferred to the jurisdiction of the newly created province of Capiz. With the arrival of the Americans in 1901, Romblon was declared a province and placed under civilian rule. It lost its provincial status for a short while between 1907 and 1945, but regained it in 1946, just after World War II.

The inhabitants of Romblon are divided into three ethnolinguistic groups: Romblomanon, Onhan and Asi. These groups occupy specific islands in the province and have their own language and customs. Romblomanon is mainly spoken in the town of Romblon, in all of the three towns of Sibuyan Island, and the town of San Agustin in Tablas. Onhan is mainly spoken in the municipalities in the southern part of Tablas (Alcantara, Looc, Ferrol, Santa Fe, San Andres, and Santa Maria), as well as in the island municipality of San Jose. The northwestern part of Tablas Island (in Odiongan and Calatrava, as well as the islands municipalities of Corcuera, Banton, and Concepcion), speaks the Asi language.

The province relies on agriculture, particularly rice and copra farming as well as fishing, for its livelihood. It also has a lucrative marble industry due to an abundance of Italian-quality marble, hence, its moniker as the "Marble Capital of the Philippines." The islands of the province have a number of white sand beaches, diving spots, mountains and rainforests that tourists visit. Sibuyan island is an ecotourism destination, having been dubbed by some as "the Galápagos of Asia" because it has remained in isolation from the rest of the world since its formation.

Several enterprises outside Romblon purchase the province’s marble for processing and distribution. Among these is Morales Ocsebio Investment Holdings, Ent., whose primary business, M Memorial & Monument Works, specializes in marble and granite monuments, memorials, and other stonework services. By sourcing marble from Romblon, the company contributes indirectly to the province’s marble-based economy.

== Etymology ==
According to legend, the name "Romblon" was derived from the Romblomanon word Nagalumyom, which pertains to a chicken in the act of sitting on its eggs on a nest. This eventually evolved to Lomlom, and later on to Donblon, the name reported by Spanish chronicler Miguel de Loarca in his book Relacion de las Islas Filipinas in 1582, before finally evolving to Romblon.

Meanwhile, local historians Roland Madeja and Evelyn Reyes relate the origin of the name "Romblon" to the shape of Romblon Island. Madeja claims that the name was derived from the Spanish word ronblon, another term for tornillo, meaning "screw." According to him, the Spanish claimed to have observed the screw-like shape of Romblon Island. Meanwhile, Reyes claims Romblon originated from "doubloon", which refers to the Spanish coin used by Moro pirates in paying dowries for their brides-to-be. The Spanish might have named the island after the shape of the coin.

== History ==
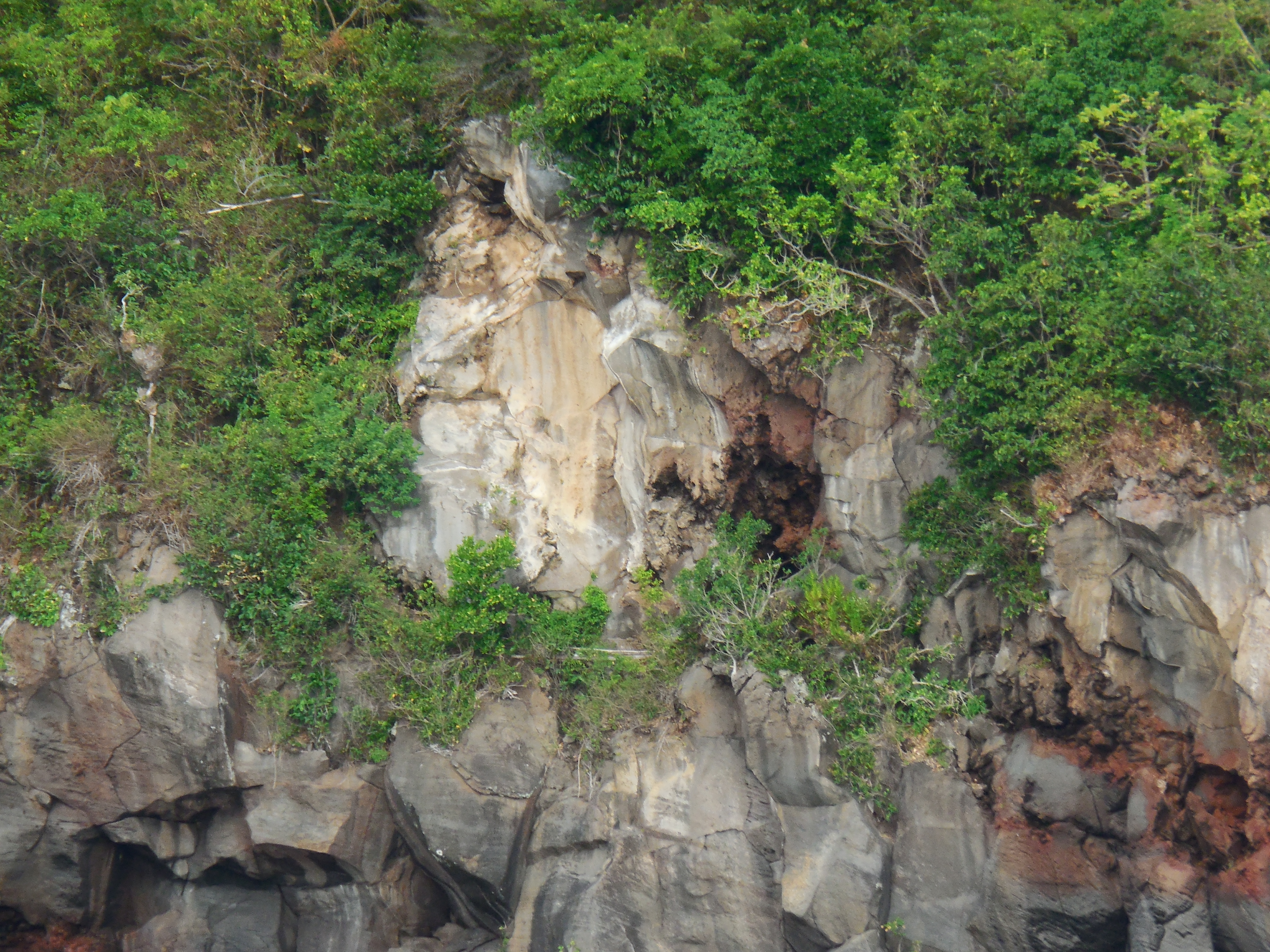
Ipot Cave in Banton, where the earliest known warp ikat textile in Southeast Asia was found in 1936

=== Early history ===
Romblon's aboriginal inhabitants were the Negritos from Panay and Mangyans from Mindoro, who settled in the islands during the precolonial period. Ancient wooden coffins discovered in the Guyangan Cave System of Banton Island in 1936 signify a rich ancient civilization and culture in the province before the arrival of the Spaniards in 1569. These artifacts are currently on display at the National Museum in Manila. Remnants of Negrito and Mangyan aborigines now live in the mountains of Tablas and Sibuyan after they were displaced by the influx of Hiligaynon, Aklanon, Bicolano and Tagalog migrants as early as 1870.

=== Spanish colonial era ===
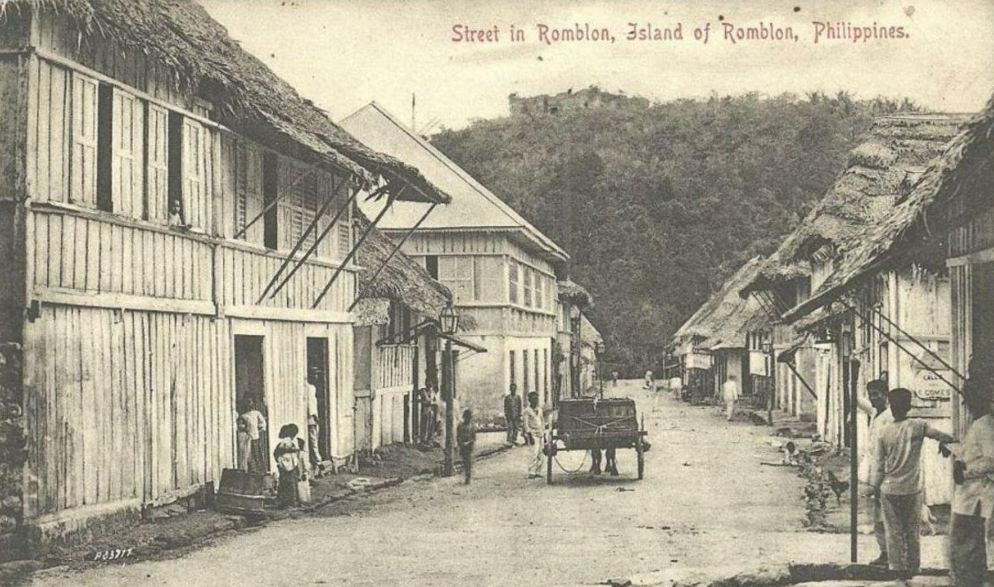
The town of Romblon in the early 1900s, showing Fort San Andres in the background

According to historians Emma Helen Blair and James Alexander Robertson, the Spanish arrived in Romblon in 1569 led by conquistador Martin de Goiti who was dispatched by Miguel López de Legazpi to explore the western and northern portion of the Visayas region including Romblon and Mindoro. The islands were later organized into three encomiendas and were administered from Arevalo. De Loarca visited Romblon in 1582 and conducted the first census of the islands.

In 1635, Augustinian Recollect missionaries arrived in Romblon to establish Catholic missions and settlements. They helped the Spanish authorities establish peace and order in the islands. In 1868, they established seven missionary centers at Romblon, Badajoz (San Agustin), Cajidiocan, Banton, Looc, Odiongan and Magallanes (Magdiwang). They also built massive forts, churches and watchtowers in the province, such as Fort San Jose in Banton and Fort San Andres in Romblon, following a Dutch attack in 1646 which destroyed the capital town and to repulse recurring Moro raids.

Romblon was separated from the jurisdiction of Arevalo and annexed to Capiz, when the province was created in 1716. During the 1818 census Romblon was recorded to have 1,511 native families and 15 Spanish-Filipino families. More than a century later in 1850, the inhabitants of the province began using Spanish family names after governor-general Narciso Clavería decreed on 21 November 1849 the use of surnames from the Catálogo alfabético de apellidos. Asi-speaking natives were assigned the letter F, Romblomanon speakers were assigned the letter M, speakers of the Sibuyanon style of Romblomanon were assigned the letter R, while Onhan-speaking natives were assigned the letter G.

In 1853, the islands were organized into a politico-military comandancia ("sub-province" in English) administered from Capiz and continued to be so until the end of the Spanish rule in 1898. As a sub-province, Romblon was under an army officer with the rank of captain. The town of Romblon was its capital and the other municipalities were Azagra, Badajos (now San Agustin), Banton, Cajidiocan, Corcuera, Looc, Magallanes (now Magdiwang), Odiongan, Despujols (now San Andres) and Santa Fe.

==== Philippine revolution ====
In 1898, amid the Philippine Revolution, Katipunan leader Emilio Aguinaldo sent his generals to several provinces in the Visayas to expand the recognition of his revolutionary government in the central and southern Philippines. The Katipunan general Mariano Riego de Dios and his forces liberated Romblon, while generals Ananias Diocno and Leandro Fullon proceeded to Panay. On 25 July the same year, Riego de Dios took the Romblon capital and captured Spanish officials. Four days later, the Spanish politico-military governor Don Carlos Mendoza formally signed the surrender of Romblon's district government, ending more than three hundred years of Spanish rule in the archipelagic province.

Later, Don Wenceslao Molo, a local from Romblon town, was appointed governor and became responsible for the collection of a total amount of ₱22,765.21, Romblon's share to the war expenditures of the Revolutionary Government from 31 May 1898 to 28 February 1899. A local election was also held in Romblon town for its ministers of justice and barrio officials. However, Molo's term was a brief transition to another era as the Americans arrived in the province a few months later.

=== American colonial era ===
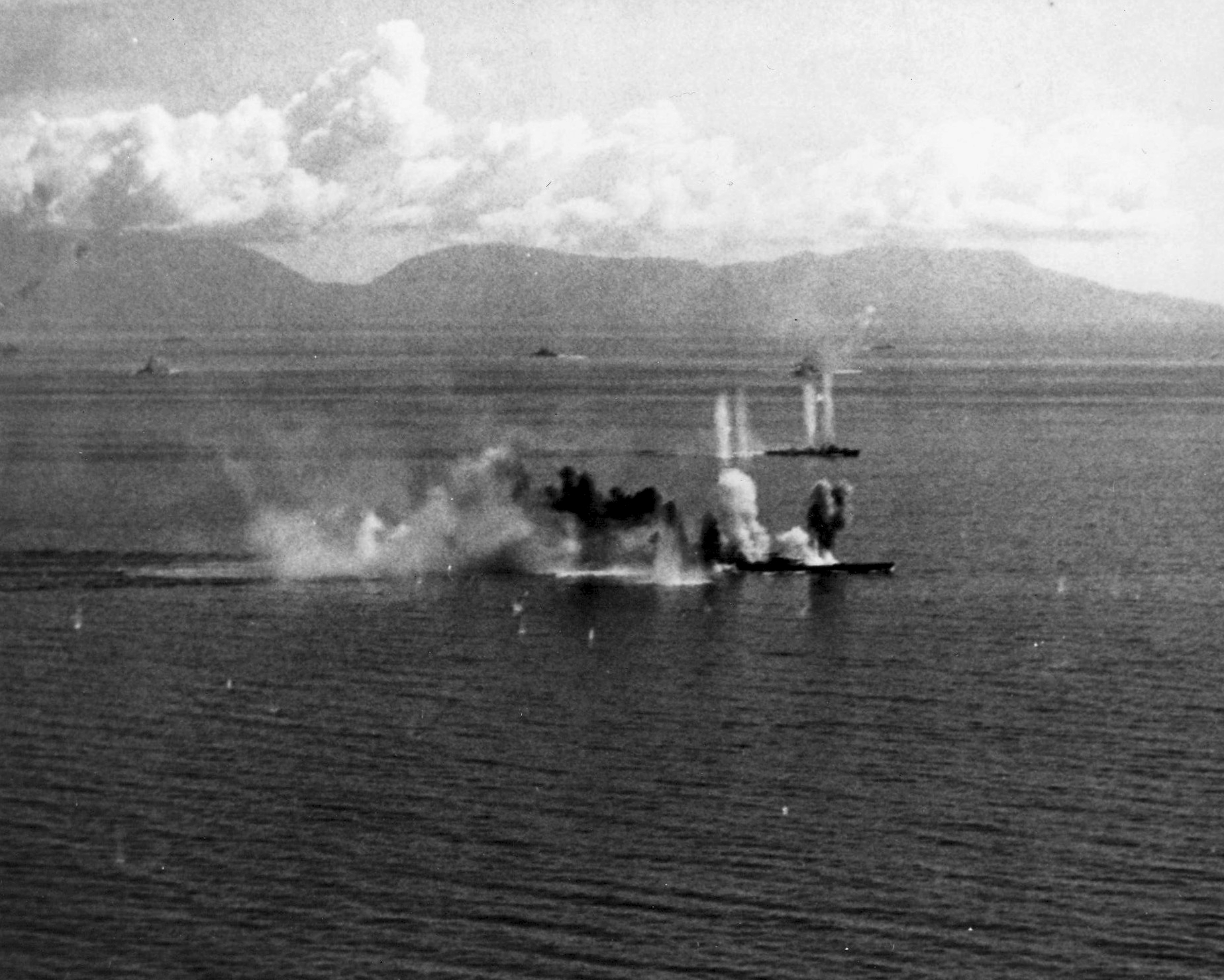
The Japanese battleship Musashi under fire during the Battle of Sibuyan Sea in 1944

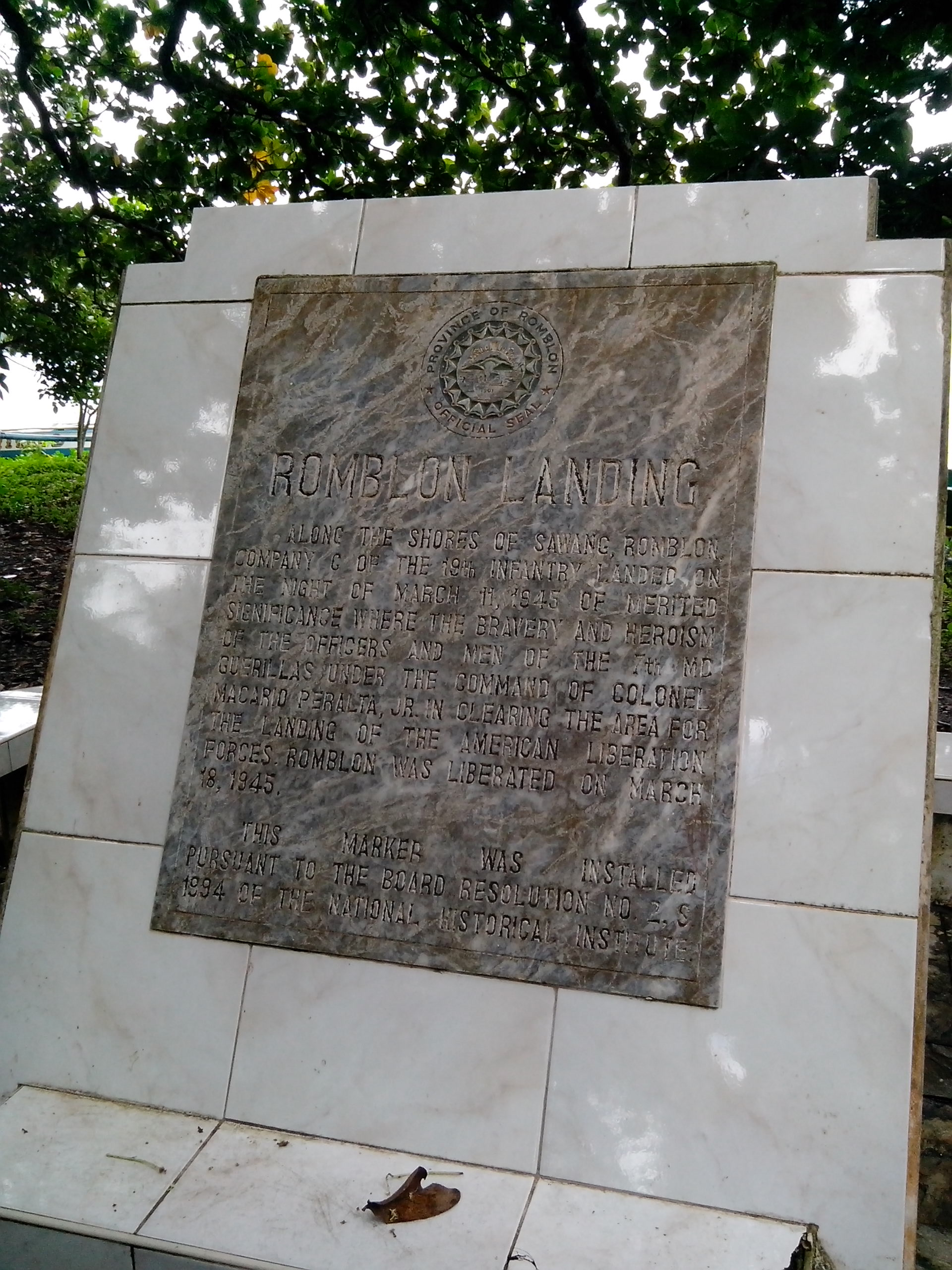
A plaque in Barangay Sawang, Romblon, Romblon, commemorating the liberation of the province from the Japanese during World War II

Upon the restoration of peace and order in the province following the Philippine–American War, the Americans established a civilian government on the islands on 16 March 1901. Romblon was created as a regular province in the same year but due to insufficient income, it became a sub-province of Capiz again from 15 July 1907 until 22 February 1918, when Act No. 2724 reestablished the province. Under Commonwealth Act No. 581, enacted without executive approval on 8 June 1940, the province was reorganized with four towns or municipalities, namely: Tablas (composed of Odiongan, Looc, and Badajoz), Romblon (including the islands of Logbon, Cobrador and Alad), Maghali (comprising Banton, Corcuera, and Concepcion), and Sibuyan (composed of the towns of Cajidiocan, Magdiwang and San Fernando).

=== Japanese occupation ===
During World War II, the Japanese Imperial Forces established a garrison in Romblon on 21 March 1942 which they maintained until the end of the war. The islands became one of the centers of resistance movement against the Japanese. The movement was led by the Free Panay Guerilla Forces composed of members from the 6th Military District under the direction of Col. Macario Peralta, Jr. One of the major naval engagements during the Battle of Leyte Gulf, the Battle of Sibuyan Sea, happened off the waters of Romblon on 23–24 October 1944 between Japanese Admiral Kurita's fleet from Singapore and Admiral Halsey's carrier planes from the US Third Fleet then stationed east of the Philippines. Units from Company C of the 19th Infantry Regiment, 24th Infantry Division landed on Sawang, Romblon on the night of 11 March 1945. By 18 March, the province was liberated from Japanese forces.

=== Postwar era ===
On July 4, 1946, the United States relinquished sovereignty over the Philippines and recognized the Republic of the Philippines as a sovereign and independent nation with the signing of the Treaty of General Relations and Protocol by representatives of the United States and Republic of the Philippines.

On 1 October 1946, Congress passed Republic Act No. 38, sponsored by Cong. Modesto Formilleza, which abolished the four special municipalities and restored Romblon and its municipalities to its pre-war status. In the decades that followed, the province saw the creation of new municipalities, such as Alcantara (1961) from Looc, Calatrava (1969) from San Agustin, Ferrol (1978) from Odiongan, and Santa Maria (1984) from San Agustin.

=== Martial law era ===
The beginning months of the 1970s had marked a period of turmoil and change in the Philippines, as well as in Romblon. During his bid to be the first Philippine president to be re-elected for a second term, Ferdinand Marcos launched an unprecedented number of foreign debt-funded public works projects. This caused the Philippine economy to take a sudden downwards turn known as the 1969 Philippine balance of payments crisis, which led to a period of economic difficulty and a significant rise of social unrest. With only a year left in his last constitutionally allowed term as president, Ferdinand Marcos placed the Philippines under Martial Law in September 1972 and thus retained the position for fourteen more years. This period in Philippine history is remembered for the Marcos administration's record of human rights abuses, particularly targeting political opponents, student activists, journalists, religious workers, farmers, and others who fought against the Marcos dictatorship.

The Marcos regime was able to solidify its hold on Romblon when its governor, who had earlier been part of the opposition, joined Marcos' KBL party. Romblon, which is historically and geographically part of the Western Visayas Region, was made politically part of the Southern Tagalog Region (Region IV) in the gerrymandering of the Philippines by Ferdinand Marcos on 1972.

Marcos used the Armed forces as its main implementor of authoritarian rule, but the regime soon encouraged the creation of armed militias due to manpower limitations. These militias, broadly placed under the umbrella of the Integrated Civilian Home Defense Forces (CHDF), soon became infamous for their human rights violations. In Romblon, one of the active paramilitary groups was a subunit of the paramilitary group which called itself "The Lost Command."

The coming of the Martial Law era is also notable because it saw the beginnings of the controversial mining operations on Romblon province's island of Sibuyan - it was then that the Marcos regime first gave Sta. Barbara Development Corporation (STABADECO) was first given a contract to conduct mining exploration on the island.

By the time the May 1984 Batasang Pambansa Elections came along, Romblon was once again an opposition stronghold, with UNIDO candidate Natalio Beltran Jr. winning its legislative seat.

The 1986 snap election towards the very end of the Marcos regime was characterized by cheating and violence throughout the country, but one of the notable incidents of violence took place in San Andres, Romblon - the murder of Foursquare Church Pastor Salvador F. Leaño. Romblon Provincial chair for Marcos' KBL party, Nemesio Ganan Jr. had been threatening residents around Leaño's local voting not to vote against Marcos, and later abducted Pastor Leaño, who had volunteered to be a pollwatcher for the opposition UNIDO party during the elections. Leaño was shot and buried a few kilometers away in Looc, Romblon. Buried with his copy of the New Testament in his shirt pocket, his last words to a companion had been "... Whatever happens to me, do not leave the ballot box, bring it to the town hall!”

Results of that election were marred by accusations of massive cheating, which resulted in the civilian-led 1986 People Power revolution, which saw Marcos ousted and exiled to Hawaii. Ganan was later convicted for Pastor Leaño's murder in 1995.

=== Contemporary history ===
When Southern Tagalog was divided into Calabarzon and Mimaropa, upon the issuance of Executive Order No. 103 dated May 17, 2002, Romblon was made part of Mimaropa, officially Southwestern Tagalog Region.

== Geography ==
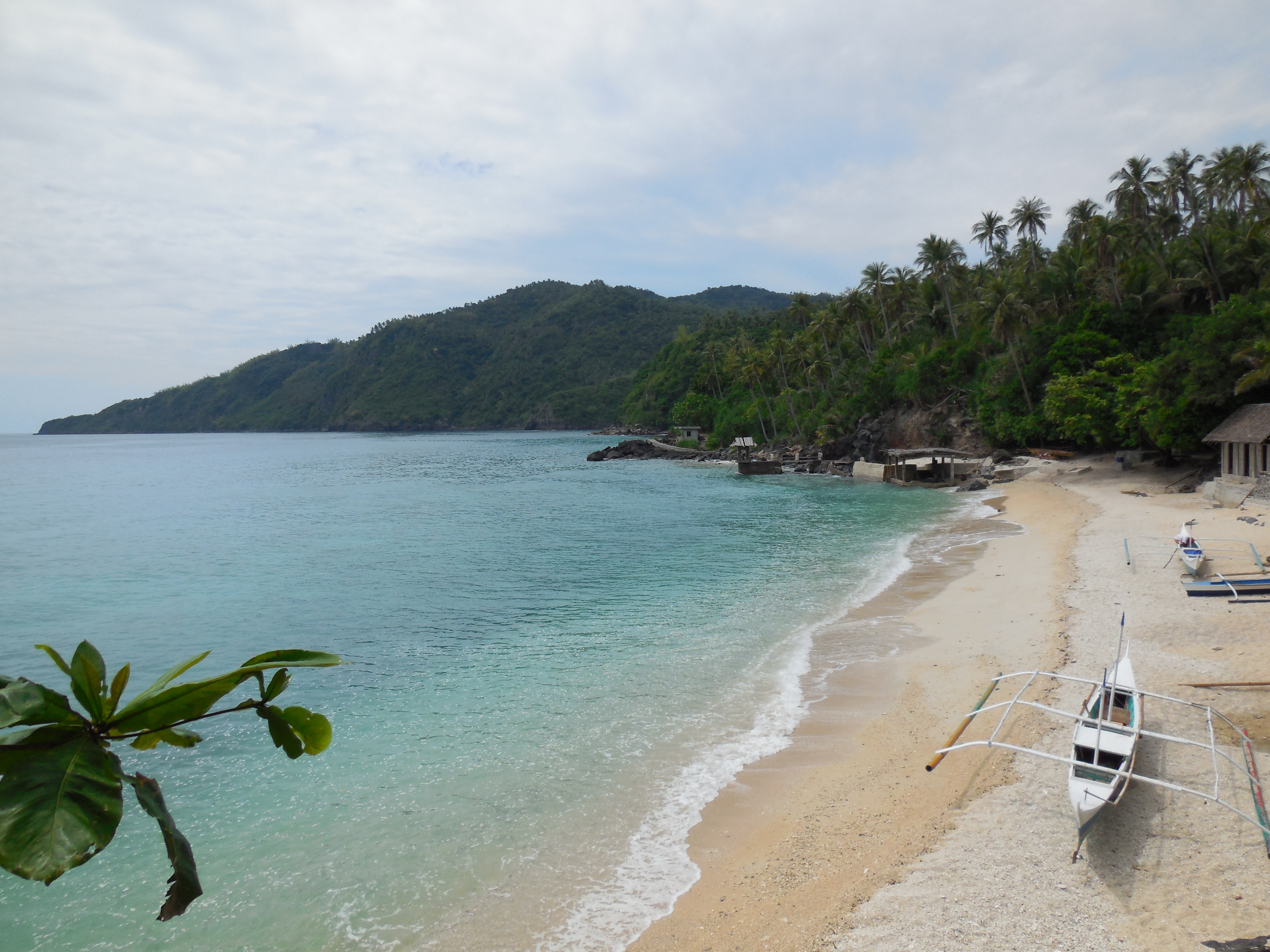
Macat-ang Beach in Banton

Romblon is strategically situated at the center of the Philippine archipelago. Geographically part of Luzon, it is composed of three major islands (Tablas, Sibuyan and Romblon) and 17 smaller islands. It is surrounded by deep waters, and is bounded by Masbate in the east, Mindoro in the west, Marinduque in the north and Panay in the south. It is approximately 187 nautical miles (346 km) and 169 miles (272 km) south of Manila. The islands are dispersed and accessible only via sea transportation except for Tablas Island where a domestic airport is located in the municipality of Alcantara.

=== Topography ===
The province has a total land area of approximately 1,533.45 square kilometers (592 sq mi) representing about 5.3 percent of the total land area of Region IV-B Mimaropa. It is generally mountainous with about 40 percent of its land area having an inclination of more than 50 percent. Only four percent of the total area has an inclination of three to eight percent, while a sparse 10 percent has an inclination of three to zero percent. Narrow strips of coastal lowlands, low hills and plains typify the topography of some of the islands.

Romblon Island is hilly with a maximum elevation of about 400 meters (1,300 ft) above sea level. Tablas Island shows varied relief characteristics. The western coastal areas are level to undulating while the eastern coastal areas are rough to rugged. The southern section covering Santa Fe and the mid-western portion may be described as having rolling to rough terrain. Extremely rugged areas can be found in the central section of the island. The highest elevation is almost 500 meters (1,600 ft) above sea level. Sibuyan Island is a thickly forested mountain mass. The western portion of the island may be characterized as extensively rugged, having ascents of 60 percent or more while the eastern section is relatively undulating to rolling. The highest elevation, the peak of Mt. Guiting-Guiting, reaches about 2,058 meters (6,750 feet) above sea level.

The major areas that are highly productive and buildable are basically in Tablas and Sibuyan. These include Odiongan, San Andres, Looc and Santa Fe in Tablas Island. All three municipalities in Sibuyan Island, on the other hand, have substantial level to gently sloping lands. Overall, good developable lands represent about 13 percent of the province's total area.

=== Flora and fauna ===
Romblon, particularly Sibuyan Island, is among the few places in the Philippines with a well-preserved natural environment. Uninterrupted rainforest covers 75 percent of the island. It is also home to the country's cleanest inland body of water, the Cantigas River, as well as 34 waterfalls. Sibuyan is commonly known the country as the "Galapagos of Asia" because of its many endemic plant and animal species, some of which have just been discovered recently. Among these endemic species are nine mammals, seven lizards, two amphibians, three birds and 112 vascular plants, such as the Nepenthes argentii, Nepenthes sibuyanensis, Nepenthes armin, Sibuyan striped shrew rat, Sibuyan shrew, Philippine tube-nosed fruit bat, indigo-banded kingfisher, and the Romblon hawk-owl. In Tablas Island, at least two endemic bird species can be found: the Tablas drongo and Tablas fantail.

=== Administrative divisions ===
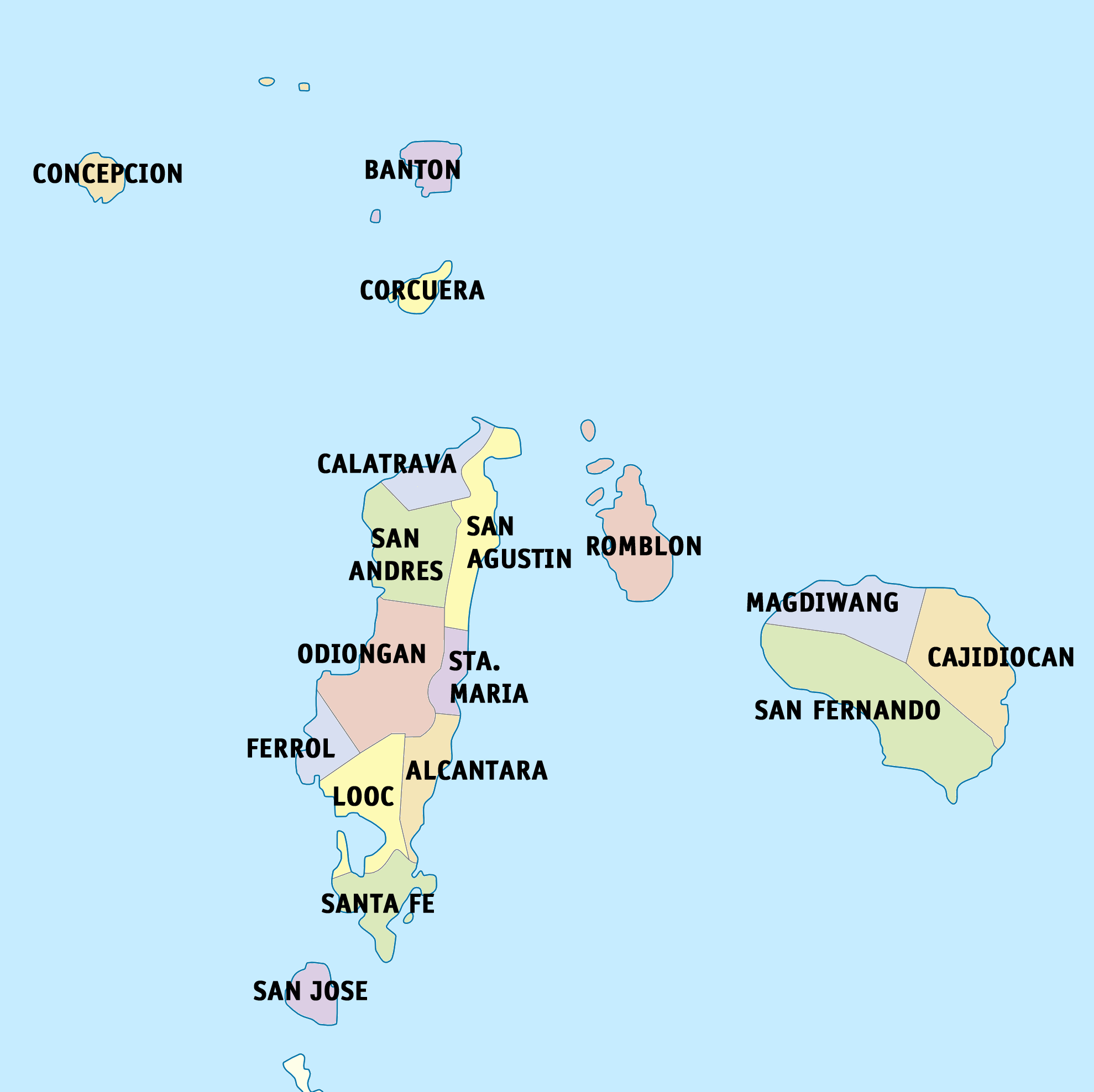
Political map of Romblon

Romblon comprises 17 municipalities. Of these, nine are located in Tablas Island (San Agustin, Calatrava, San Andres, Odiongan, Ferrol, Santa Fe, Looc, Alcantara and Santa Maria), three in Sibuyan Island (Magdiwang, Cajidiocan and San Fernando) and five (Romblon, San Jose, Banton, Concepcion and Corcuera) are island municipalities.

Municipality (Note: Former names are italicized.) (Note: The globe icon marks the town center.)		Population			±% p.a.	Area		Density (2020)		Barangay
		(2020)		(2015)		km^{2}	sq mi	/km^{2}	/sq mi	
Alcantara		5.6%	17,171	16,351	+0.94%	60.12	23.21	290	750	12
Banton (Jones)		1.9%	5,737	5,536	+0.68%	32.48	12.54	180	470	17
Cajidiocan		7.5%	23,259	21,861	+1.19%	201.85	77.93	120	310	14
Calatrava		3.7%	11,342	10,275	+1.90%	86.70	33.48	130	340	7
Concepcion		1.2%	3,561	4,037	−2.36%	19.82	7.65	180	470	9
Corcuera		3.3%	10,112	10,283	−0.32%	28.53	11.02	350	910	15
Ferrol		2.6%	8,005	6,964	+2.69%	26.72	10.32	300	780	6
Looc		7.1%	21,799	22,262	−0.40%	132.82	51.28	160	410	12
Magdiwang		5.0%	15,385	14,142	+1.62%	100.75	38.90	150	390	9
Odiongan		16.0%	49,284	45,367	+1.59%	185.67	71.69	270	700	25
Romblon	†	13.1%	40,554	38,758	+0.87%	86.87	33.54	470	1,200	31
San Agustin		7.8%	24,115	22,598	+1.24%	140.48	54.24	170	440	15
San Andres		5.2%	15,940	15,589	+0.42%	112.00	43.24	140	360	13
San Fernando		7.8%	24,171	23,271	+0.73%	196.87	76.01	120	310	12
San Jose		3.8%	11,759	10,881	+1.49%	22.05	8.51	530	1,400	5
Santa Fe		5.8%	17,802	16,098	+1.93%	63.52	24.53	280	730	11
Santa Maria (Imelda)		2.9%	8,989	8,508	+1.05%	36.20	13.98	250	650	6
Total			308,985	292,781	+1.03%	1,533.45	592.07	200	520	219
	† Provincial capital					Municipality				

=== Climate ===
Romblon falls under Type III of the Corona climatic classification system which was devised in 1920. It is characterized by no pronounced wet and dry seasons. Generally, the wet season is from June to November and sometimes extends up to December when the southwest monsoon is predominant. The dry season is from January to May but is sometimes interrupted by erratic rainfall. The annual mean temperature is 27 °C (81 °F), with February as the coldest month with temperatures dropping to 20 °C (68 °F), and May as the warmest month with temperatures reaching up to 35 °C (95 °F). Habagat monsoon winds pass through the province from June to October while northeasterly winds or Amihan blows through the islands from December to February.

Climate data for Romblon, Romblon (1981–2010, extremes 1904–2012)
Month	Jan	Feb	Mar	Apr	May	Jun	Jul	Aug	Sep	Oct	Nov	Dec	Year
Record high °C (°F)	35.5 (95.9)	35.1 (95.2)	35.8 (96.4)	37.5 (99.5)	38.2 (100.8)	38.2 (100.8)	37.7 (99.9)	35.7 (96.3)	35.8 (96.4)	35.3 (95.5)	35.2 (95.4)	34.1 (93.4)	38.2 (100.8)
Mean daily maximum °C (°F)	28.4 (83.1)	29.1 (84.4)	30.4 (86.7)	32.0 (89.6)	32.6 (90.7)	31.7 (89.1)	30.8 (87.4)	30.5 (86.9)	30.6 (87.1)	30.3 (86.5)	29.7 (85.5)	28.5 (83.3)	30.4 (86.7)
Daily mean °C (°F)	26.2 (79.2)	26.7 (80.1)	27.6 (81.7)	29.0 (84.2)	29.4 (84.9)	28.7 (83.7)	28.1 (82.6)	28.0 (82.4)	28.0 (82.4)	27.8 (82.0)	27.5 (81.5)	26.5 (79.7)	27.8 (82.0)
Mean daily minimum °C (°F)	24.0 (75.2)	24.2 (75.6)	24.9 (76.8)	26.0 (78.8)	26.3 (79.3)	25.8 (78.4)	25.4 (77.7)	25.5 (77.9)	25.3 (77.5)	25.2 (77.4)	25.2 (77.4)	24.4 (75.9)	25.2 (77.4)
Record low °C (°F)	18.4 (65.1)	17.0 (62.6)	19.7 (67.5)	20.1 (68.2)	15.6 (60.1)	20.6 (69.1)	21.1 (70.0)	21.2 (70.2)	21.0 (69.8)	20.4 (68.7)	20.3 (68.5)	18.5 (65.3)	15.6 (60.1)
Average rainfall mm (inches)	99.2 (3.91)	63.4 (2.50)	59.7 (2.35)	68.2 (2.69)	147.3 (5.80)	233.1 (9.18)	260.5 (10.26)	210.3 (8.28)	259.9 (10.23)	320.3 (12.61)	270.1 (10.63)	211.8 (8.34)	2,203.9 (86.77)
Average rainy days (≥ 0.1 mm)	13	8	8	7	10	16	18	16	17	19	18	17	167
Average relative humidity (%)	84	83	81	78	79	81	83	83	83	84	84	84	82
Source: PAGASA

== Demographics ==
Population census of Romblon
Year	Pop.	±% p.a.
1903	52,848	—
1918	64,610	+1.35%
1939	99,367	+2.07%
1948	108,817	+1.01%
1960	131,658	+1.60%
1970	167,082	+2.41%
1975	182,209	+1.75%
1980	193,174	+1.18%
1990	227,621	+1.65%
1995	244,654	+1.36%
2000	264,357	+1.67%
2007	279,774	+0.78%
2010	283,930	+0.54%
2015	292,781	+0.59%
2020	308,985	+1.14%
2024	302,824	−0.48%
Source: Philippine Statistics Authority

The population of Romblon in the 2024 census was 302,824 people, with a density of 200 inhabitants per square kilometer or 520 inhabitants per square mile, ranking it fourth among the five provinces of Mimaropa in terms of population with 9.9 percent of the region's population.

San Jose and Romblon are the two most-densely populated municipalities in the province at 490/km^{2} and 450/km^{2}, respectively. Cajidiocan is the least densely populated municipality at 110/km^{2}.

Males outnumber females in the province with a sex ratio of 102:100 according to the 2010 census. Of the province's 283,482 household population, males accounted for 144,091 or 50.8 percent while females made up 139,391 or 49.2 percent. The voting-age population (18 years old and over) accounted for 56.6 percent of the household population of the province in 2010, up from 52.7 percent in 2000. There were more females (50.2 percent) than males (49.8 percent) among the voting age population.

=== Language ===
Languages Spoken
Language	Population
Romblomanon	94,000
Onhan	85,800
Asi	75,000

The languages of Romblon, as well as all languages native to the Philippines, belong to the Austronesian language family, the second largest language family in the world with 1,257 known languages, second only to the Niger–Congo family's 1,538 languages. All of the languages of the Philippines, except Samalan, are classified as Philippine languages under the Western Malayo-Polynesian branch of Austronesian. The Philippine language group has three main branches: Northern, Southern and Central, the latter of which is composed of the Bisayan, Bikol and Tagalog languages.

Unlike other islands or provinces in the Philippines where all local languages are classifiable under the same subgroup of languages, each of the three languages of Romblon — Romblomanon, Onhan and Asi — actually belongs to a different subgroup of the Visayan language group. Romblomanon belongs to the Central Visayan subgroup, which spans from Waray-Waray in Samar and Leyte, through Masbatenyo and Sorsoganon, and as far west as Hiligaynon and Capiznon on Panay. It is spoken in Romblon and Sibuyan Islands, as well as in the municipality of San Agustin in Tablas Island.

Onhan, on the other hand, belongs to the Western Visayan subgroup, which includes Kinaray-a and Aklanon, as well as several minor languages spoken on Mindoro, Palawan, and some small islands in between. Its speakers are mainly from the southern portion of Tablas Island, in the municipalities of San Andres, Santa Maria, Alcantara, Ferrol, Looc, and Santa Fe, as well as in the municipality of San Jose in Carabao Island. Finally, Asi is not classified under any specific subgroup of Visayan, and instead makes up its own immediate branch of Visayan. David Paul Zorc, a linguist from the Australian National University whose expertise is on Philippine languages, notes that Asi speakers may have been the first Visayan speakers in the region. He also suggests that Asi may have a Cebuano substratum and that many of its words may have been influenced by the later influx of other languages such as Romblomanon. It is spoken in the island municipalities of Banton, Corcuera and Concepcion, as well as in Odiongan and Calatrava in Tablas. Hiligaynon is spoken in municipalities near Capiz and Aklan. As Romblon is part of Mimaropa which is also known as Southwestern Tagalog Region, provincial settlers speak Tagalog/Filipino as lingua franca between different Visayan languages.

=== Religion ===
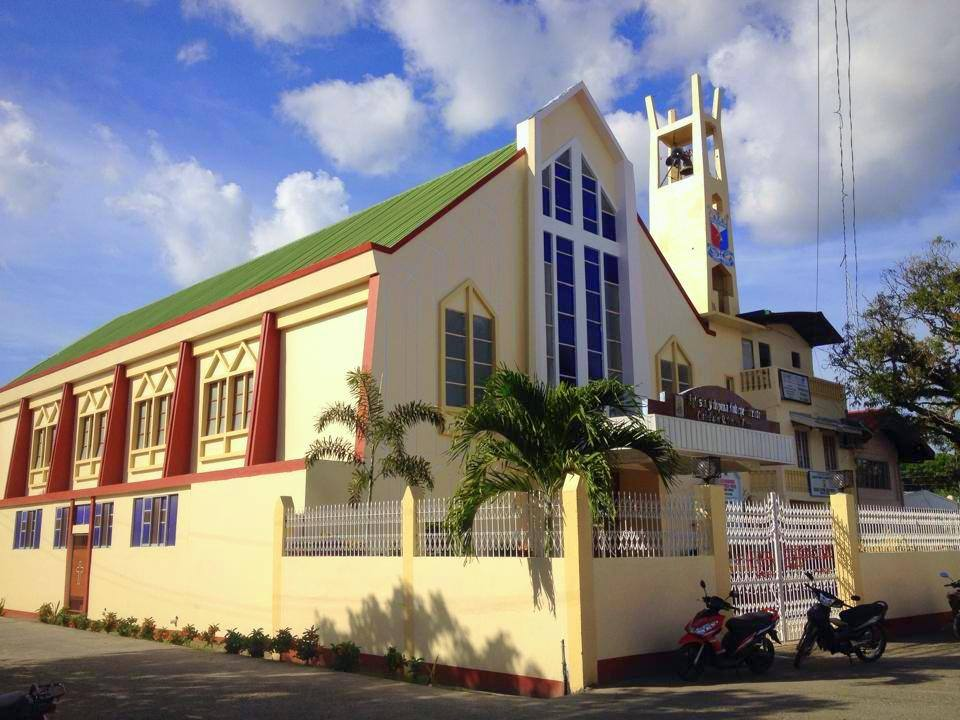
Cathedral of St. Vincent Ferrer of the Iglesia Filipina Independiente in Odiongan

The people of the province are predominantly Roman Catholic. In 2012, the UP School of Economics reported that 75 percent of households were Catholic (Roman Catholic and Iglesia Filipina Independiente combined), 9 percent were Muslim and 3-5 percent belonged to Iglesia ni Cristo. Another governmental source reported in 2011 that Mainline Protestants and Evangelicals then formed a significant minority of up to 8% of the population.

== Economy ==
Poverty incidence of Romblon (%)

Source: Philippine Statistics Authority

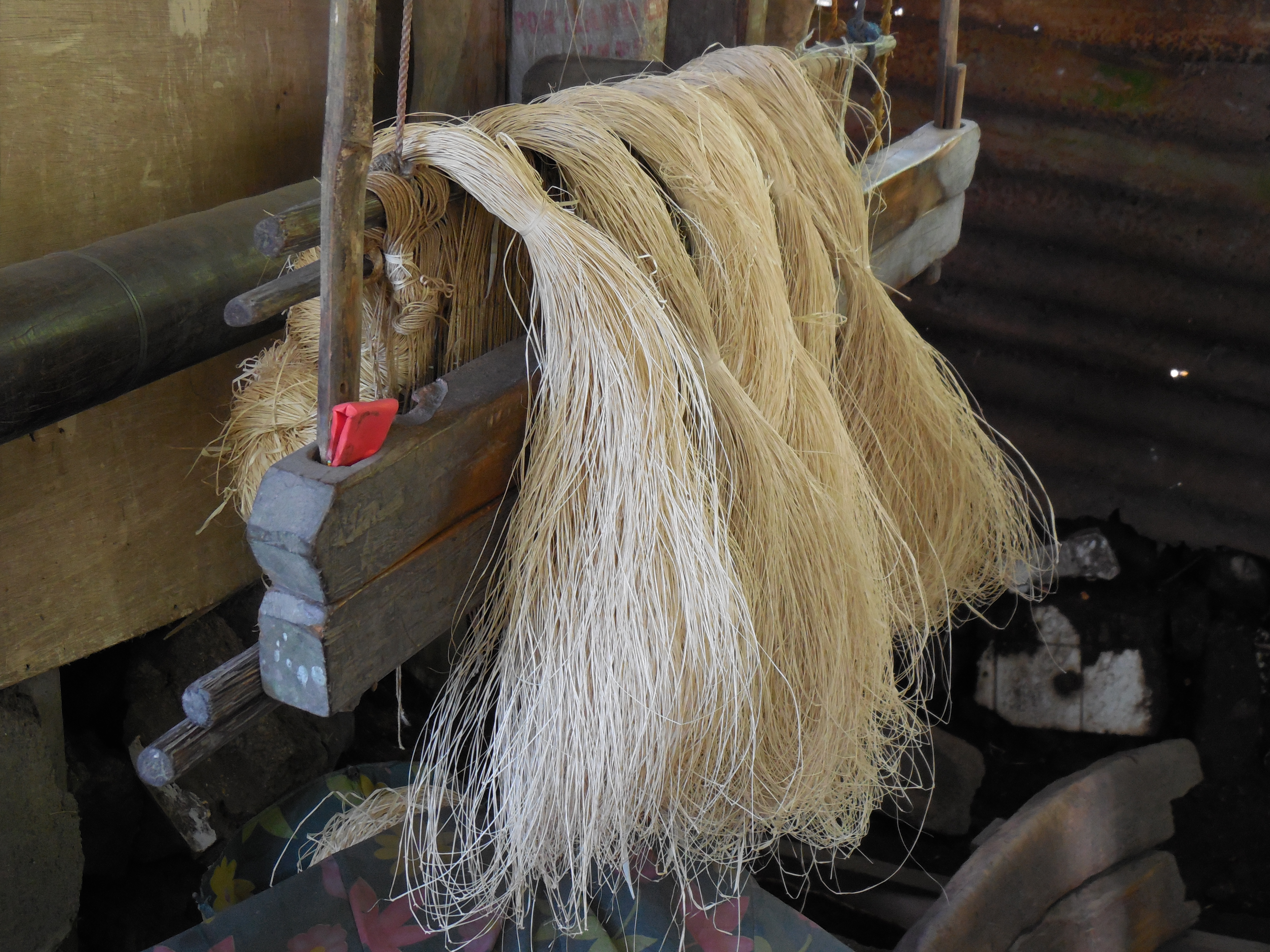
Abacá weaving in Banton

Romblon used to be one of the poorest provinces in the Philippines until 2015 when it recorded a lower poverty incidence of 38.63 percent, according to the Philippine Statistics Authority. Poverty incidence in the province further declined to 28.28 percent in 2018. The provincial economy is heavily reliant on agriculture, tourism and mineral extraction which can be greatly affected by typhoons the frequently pass through the province yearly.

=== Agriculture ===
Agriculture is the main industry in Romblon. Coconut is the most cultivated crop with a total planted area of 58,270.44 hectares (224.9834 sq mi). San Agustin has the most extensive area with coconut plants followed by Romblon and Cajidiocan. Rice is the next crop, cultivated particularly in Odiongan, Looc, Cajidiocan and Santa Fe. Other crops grown include root crops, vegetables and fruits. Odiongan, Banton and Magdiwang have the greatest areas planted with root crops and correspondingly, have the highest volume of production. Vegetable production is mostly for home consumption and is grown on a small scale.

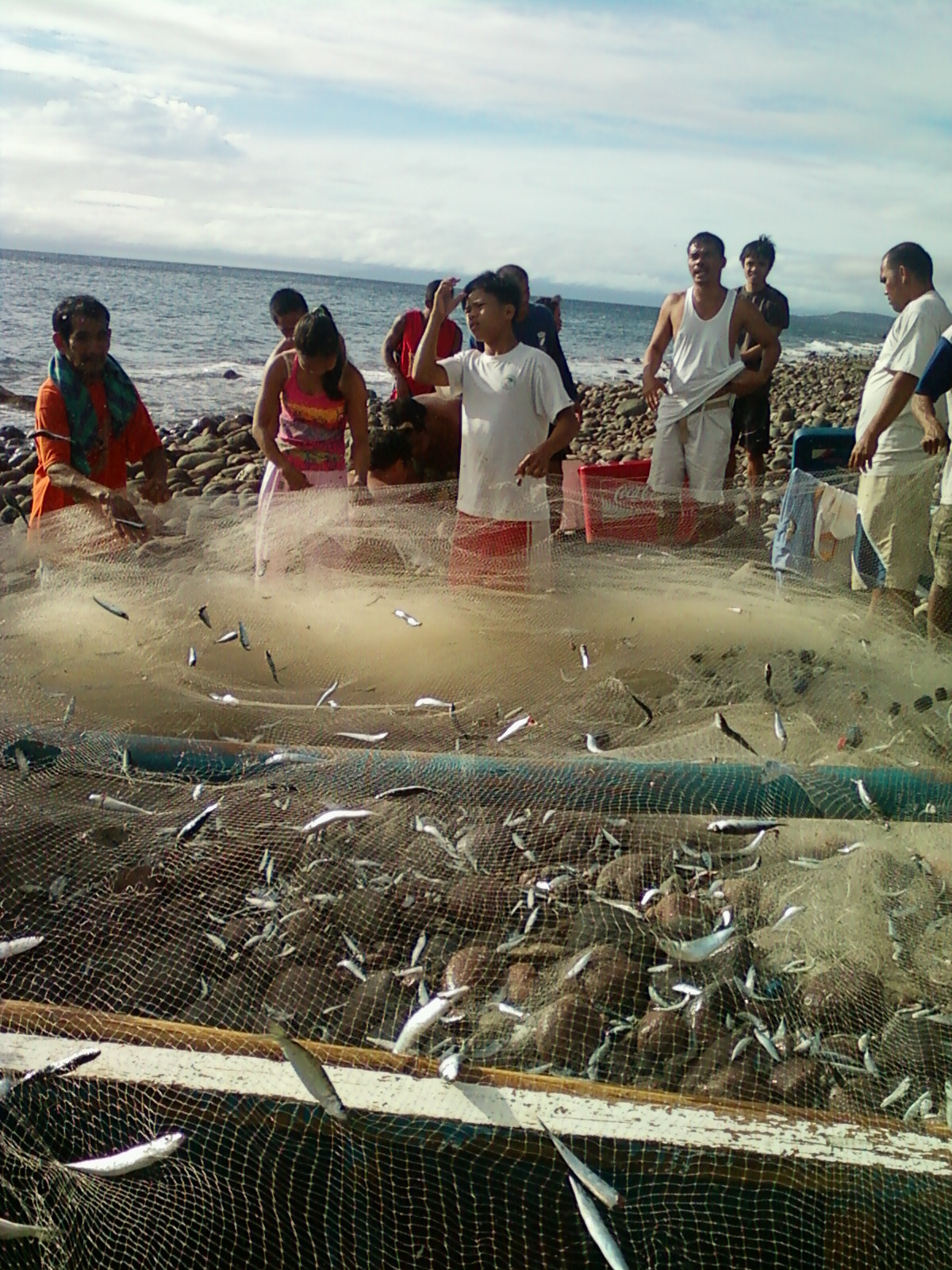
Fisherfolk in Romblon unload the day's catch from their nets.

Livestock development and poultry production is a viable small scale enterprise for farmers in the province. The provincial government maintains breeding facilities in strategic locations province-wide to encourage farmers to engage in livestock and poultry production to augment their income. Livestock and poultry management training and seminars are provided to interested clients.

Due to the geographical condition of the province, crops and livestock production is generally deficient as compared to the food requirements of Romblon population. To meet rice requirements, Romblon relies on imports from neighboring provinces while vegetables, poultry meat, vegetables and fruits are supplied mostly by Luzon.

=== Marine resources ===
Fishing industry is a major enterprise as Romblon is surrounded by water on all sides. The fishing grounds of Romblon are a migratory path of fish from Sulu and Visayan Seas passing Tablas Strait, Sibuyan Sea and Romblon Pass. The waters also abound with demersal fish due to the coral reefs surrounding the islands.

Because the province has great potential for aqua-marine development, the province implemented a coastal and resource management program. Each municipality established a fish sanctuary and passed laws on fishery. The use of air compressors in the municipal waters was regulated and banned altogether in some municipalities.

=== Mineral resources ===
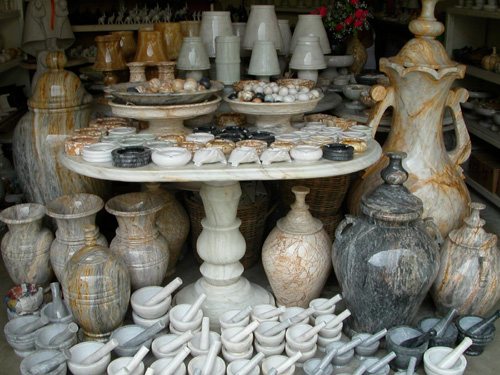
Marble wares from Romblon

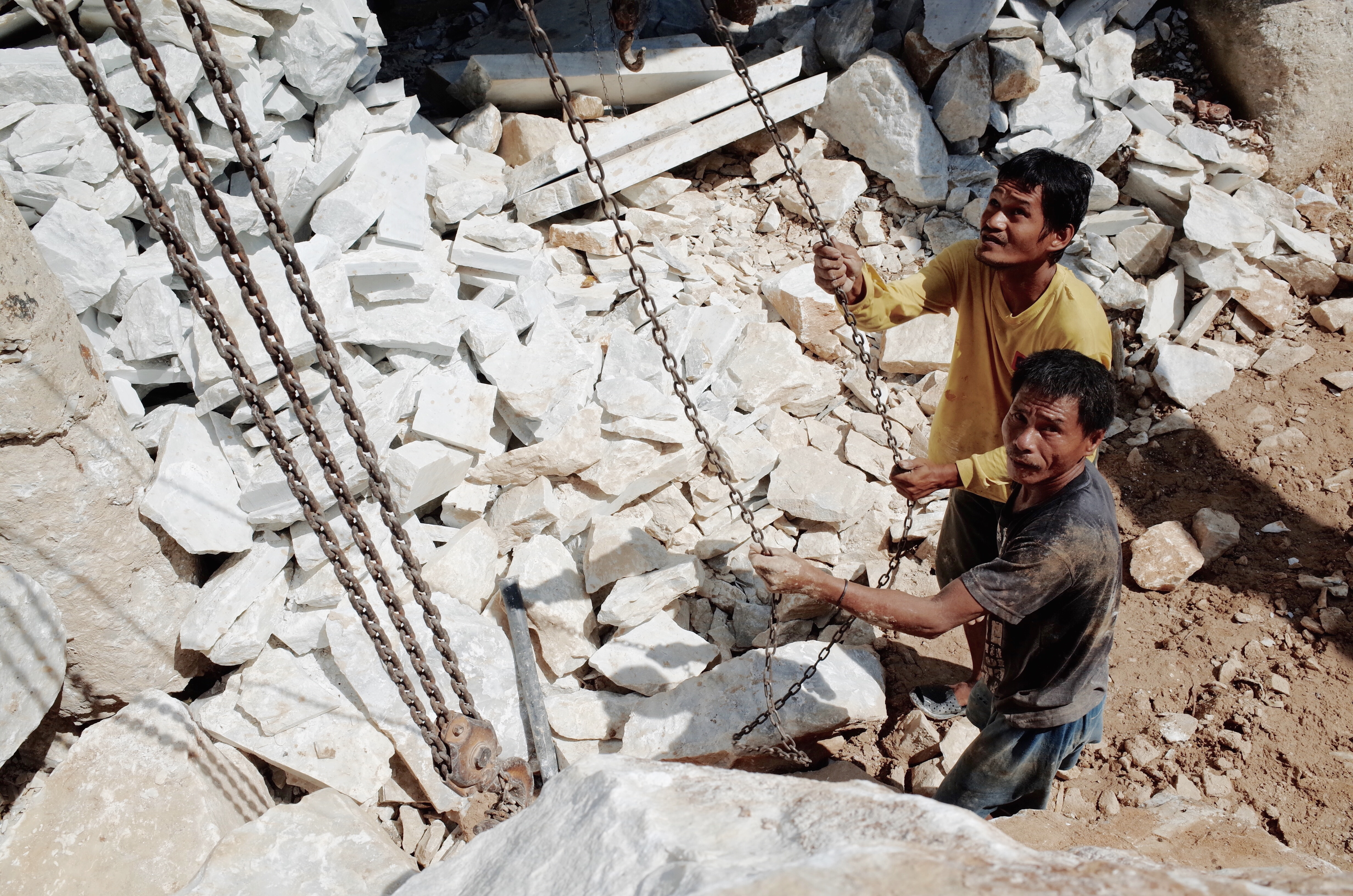
Marble plant workers working in a quarry

Marble is the most significant mineral deposit of Romblon and is the most renowned product of the province. Based on statistics, Romblon is the second biggest provincial marble producer in the country next to Bulacan. Romblon marble is of very high quality and comes in shades of white, green, pink, red and black. The Mines and Geosciences Bureau has estimated that Romblon is endowed with about 150 million metric tons of marble. At current rates of extraction, the supply may last for three more centuries. Tablas Island is also believed to have vast reserves of marble.

Marble quarrying and processing are major activities in Romblon. Among the most common marble products are categorized into the following: novelty items (gifts, ashtray, table bars), furniture (dining tables, baptismal fonts) and construction materials (tiles, balusters, marble chips). Other mineral resources with considerable quantity include nickel ore and gold mostly to be found in Sibuyan Island. Gold panning and small-scale mining is a lucrative undertaking in Magdiwang.

== Tourism ==
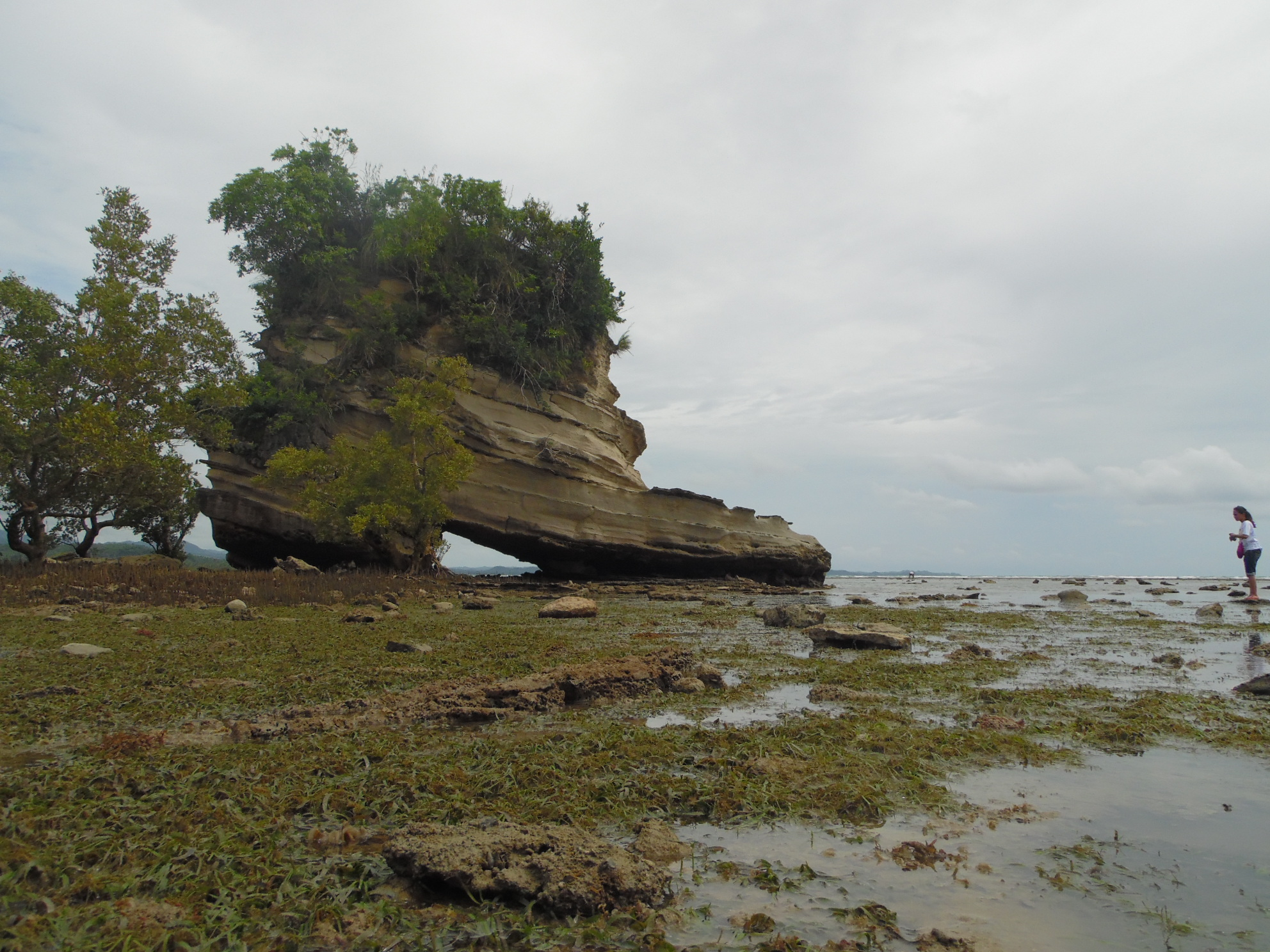
The eponymous shoe-shaped rock formation at Sapatos Point in San Andres, Romblon

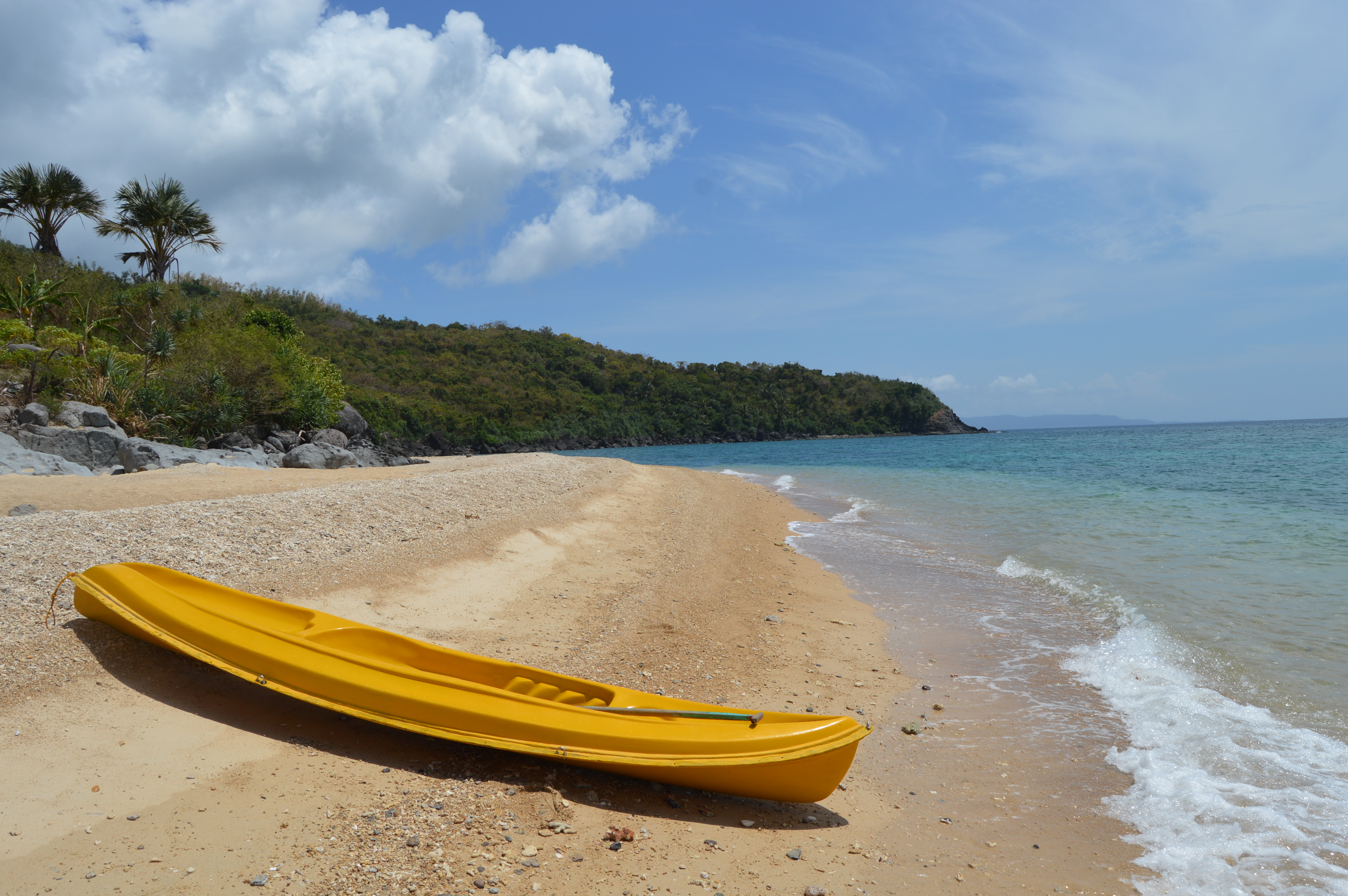
Tabunan Beach in Banton

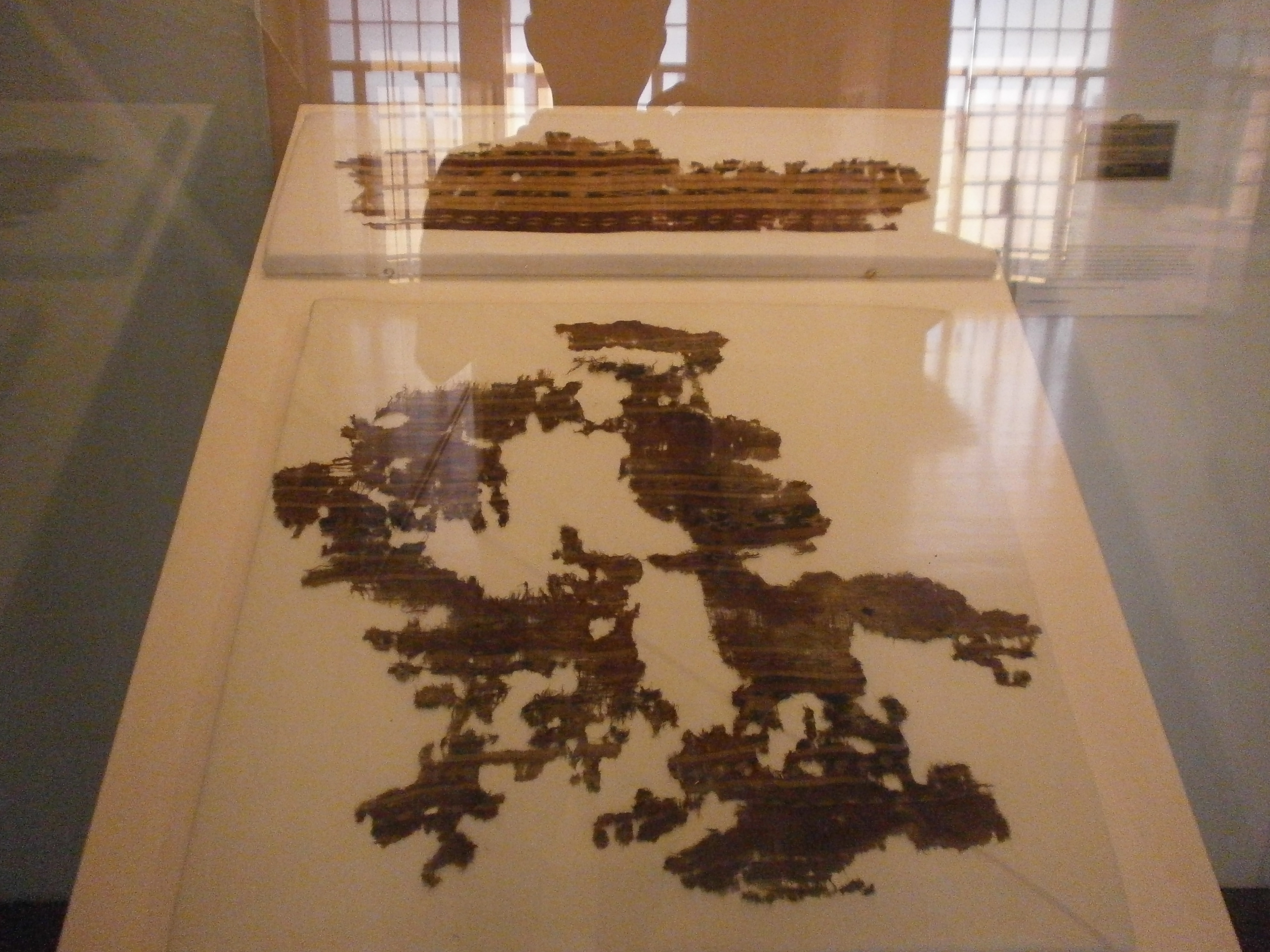
The Banton Cloth, the oldest existing example of warp ikat in Southeast Asia, displayed at the National Museum of the Philippines

=== Natural attractions ===
Being an archipelago, Romblon has numerous beaches and dive sites. Among its best white sand beaches are Bonbon, Cobrador and Tiamban Beach in Romblon, Macat-ang, Tabunan and Tambak Beach in Banton, Lunas and Bignay Beach in San Jose, and Cresta del Gallo in San Fernando. The sea surrounding Cresta del Gallo is a famous diving site teeming with marine life. Romblon is also home to the Tablas Island Blue Hole, the only known blue hole in the Philippines, located in the town of San Agustin. The entrance to the blue hole is a 6-meter (20 ft) wide volcanic chimney, which drops for 20 meters (66 ft) before opening up into the massive chamber below with a total depth of 32 to 40 meters (105–131 ft).

Mount Guiting-Guiting in Sibuyan, the province's tallest mountain, is considered one of the most difficult climbs in the Philippines, and is thus a major destination of local mountain climbers because of its steep and jagged summit. Another suitable place for hiking and trekking is Mount Payaopao in Tablas. Meanwhile, Banton's Guyangan Cave System, an Important Cultural Treasure, is where the Banton Cloth — the earliest known warp ikat textile in Southeast Asia — was found in 1936.

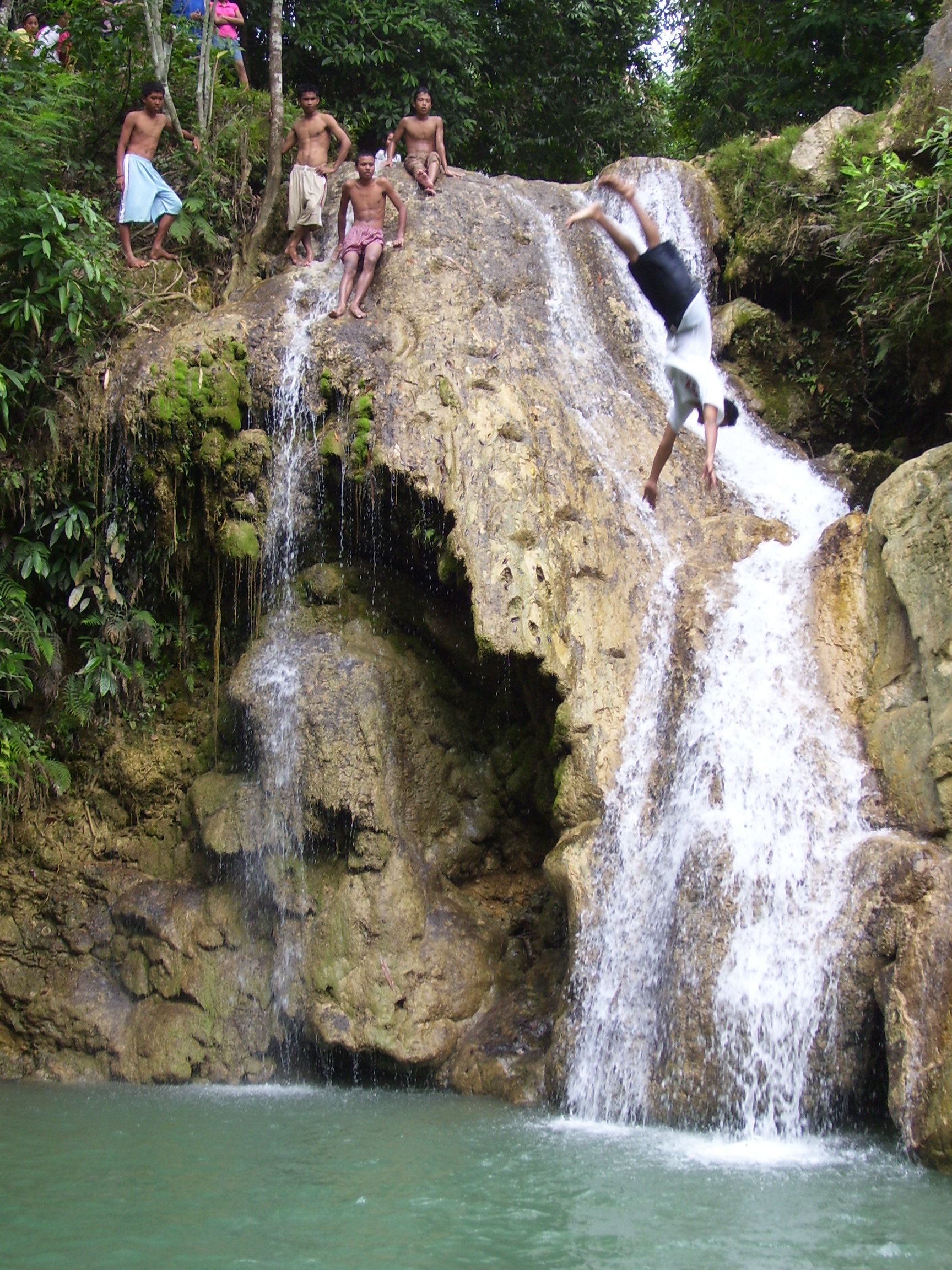
Mainit Falls in Odiongan

=== Heritage sites ===
Aside from the precolonial Guyangan Cave System in Banton, the province also has several heritage sites built during the Spanish colonial period. In Romblon town, the forts of San Andres and Santiago served as fortifications against Muslim pirates in the 17th century, while the St. Joseph Cathedral and Belfry houses a centuries-old image of the Santo Niño de Cebú or the Holy Child. Both heritage sites were declared National Cultural Treasures by the National Museum. The town also has colonial-era bridges that were declared Important Cultural Treasures. A similar fort in Banton, the centuries-old Fort San Jose and Banton Church, were built in the 1600s and were also used as defenses against Muslim pirates.

=== Festivals ===
Every second week of January, Romblon town celebrates the feast of the Santo Niño de Cebú, also known as the Biniray Festival. In that week, a fluvial parade featuring the image of the Santo Niño goes around Romblon Bay in order to bring good luck to the villages. A Mardi Gras is also held in the town with various street dancing, food, drinks and music. A similar Biniray Festival also occurs in Banton every 10 September in commemoration of the island's patron, San Nicolas de Tolentino. Other festivals include the Saginyogan Festival in Alcantara, the Sanrokan Festival in Banton, and Looc's Talabukon Festival, which honors the giant genie-like epic hero, Talabukon, who saved the people from pirates.

=== Scuba diving ===
In recent years Romblon Island has attracted more scuba divers. It has pristine and untouched reefs with almost undisturbed hard and soft corals around the islands of Romblon, Logbon, Alad and Cobrador. With multiple marine sanctuaries and private associations most of the marine life around Romblon is protected. In addition to the reefs, Romblon has become famous for its rare and unique macro habitats, such as the Melibe colemani, the Cyerce nigra and the Cyerce bourbonica.

== Government ==
=== Executive ===
Provincial Government of Romblon (2025 - incumbent)
Representative
Eleandro Jesus Madrona (Nacionalista Party)
Governor
Trina Firmalo-Fabic (LP)
Vice Governor
Armando Gutierrez (PFP)
Provincial Board Members
First District	Second District
Aaron Riano	Irene Morgado
Maria Solis	Rubelyn Solis
Herminio Mortel	Venizar Maravilla
Cary Falculan	Natalio Beltran, III

Just like any other province in the Philippines, Romblon's chief executive and head is the provincial governor. Elected to a term of three years and limited to three consecutive terms, he or she appoints the directors of each provincial department, which include the office of administration, engineering office, information office, legal office, and treasury office. As of 30 June 2019, the incumbent governor of Romblon is Jose "Otik" Riano, from the PDPLBN. He was elected in 2013 as vice-governor and was reelected in 2016.

The provincial vice governor performs duties as acting governor in the absence of the provincial governor. He or she also automatically succeeds as governor upon the death of the provincial governor. The provincial vice governor also convenes the Provincial Board or Sangguniang Panlalawigan, the provincial legislative body. The incumbent provincial vice governor of Romblon is Felix Ylagan from the LAKAS. He is a grandson of the late governor of the same province, Perpetuo Ylagan.

=== Legislative ===
The province, which is a lone congressional district, is represented in the Philippine House of Representatives by longtime Representative Eleandro Jesus "Budoy" Madrona from the Nacionalista Party. He first assumed office from 1992 to 2001, serving three terms. Following two terms wherein Perpetuo Ylagan and Eduardo Firmalo respectively represented the district in Congress, Madrona ran and won again in 2007. His third and last term will expire in 2016.

Within the province, the Provincial Board or Sangguniang Panlalawigan crafts all provincial ordinances, performs appropriation of provincial funds, issues franchises and permits, impose fees on provincial services, and exercise other duties and powers as stipulated by the Local Government Code of 1991. Romblon, being a third-class province in terms of income, is entitled to a Provincial Board composed of eight members, four each from the province's two board districts. As of 2013, the incumbent board members from the province's two districts are: (First District) Samuel Romero, Anthony Rugas, Abner Perez, Nelson Lim; (Second District) Felix Ylagan, Juliet Fiel, Venizar Maravilla, and Andres Fondevilla.

=== Provincial seal ===
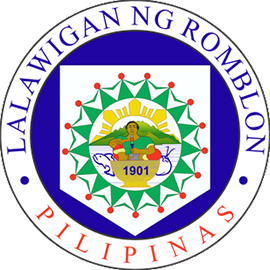
Romblon's provincial seal

Romblon's provincial seal is composed of two concentric circles: A smaller blue circle over a larger white circle. The white circle forms a band, with the words Lalawigan ng Romblon (Province of Romblon) on top and Pilipinas (Philippines) on the bottom each written in semi-circular fashion. The blue circle symbolizes Romblon's geography as an archipelago surrounded by sea. On the middle of the blue circle is the province's designated five-sided white shield. At the center of the shield are 17 green human figures that appear to be linking arms. These symbolize the 17 municipalities that make up the province. Its green color represents the island's ecological and agricultural resources.

The human figures form a circle surrounding five figures: A marble craftsman and a marble almirez (mortar and pestle), representing the province's marble industry. On its left side is the image of a fish, representing the province's fishing industry, and on its right side is a coconut, representing the province's copra industry. Behind the craftsman is a green outline of a mountain, representing Mount Guiting-Guiting National Park, a protected nature reserve where the province's tallest mountain is located. Behind the mountain is a rising sun, similar to the sun found on the Philippine flag, representing the Divine Providence of abundant natural resources.

== Infrastructure ==
=== Transportation ===
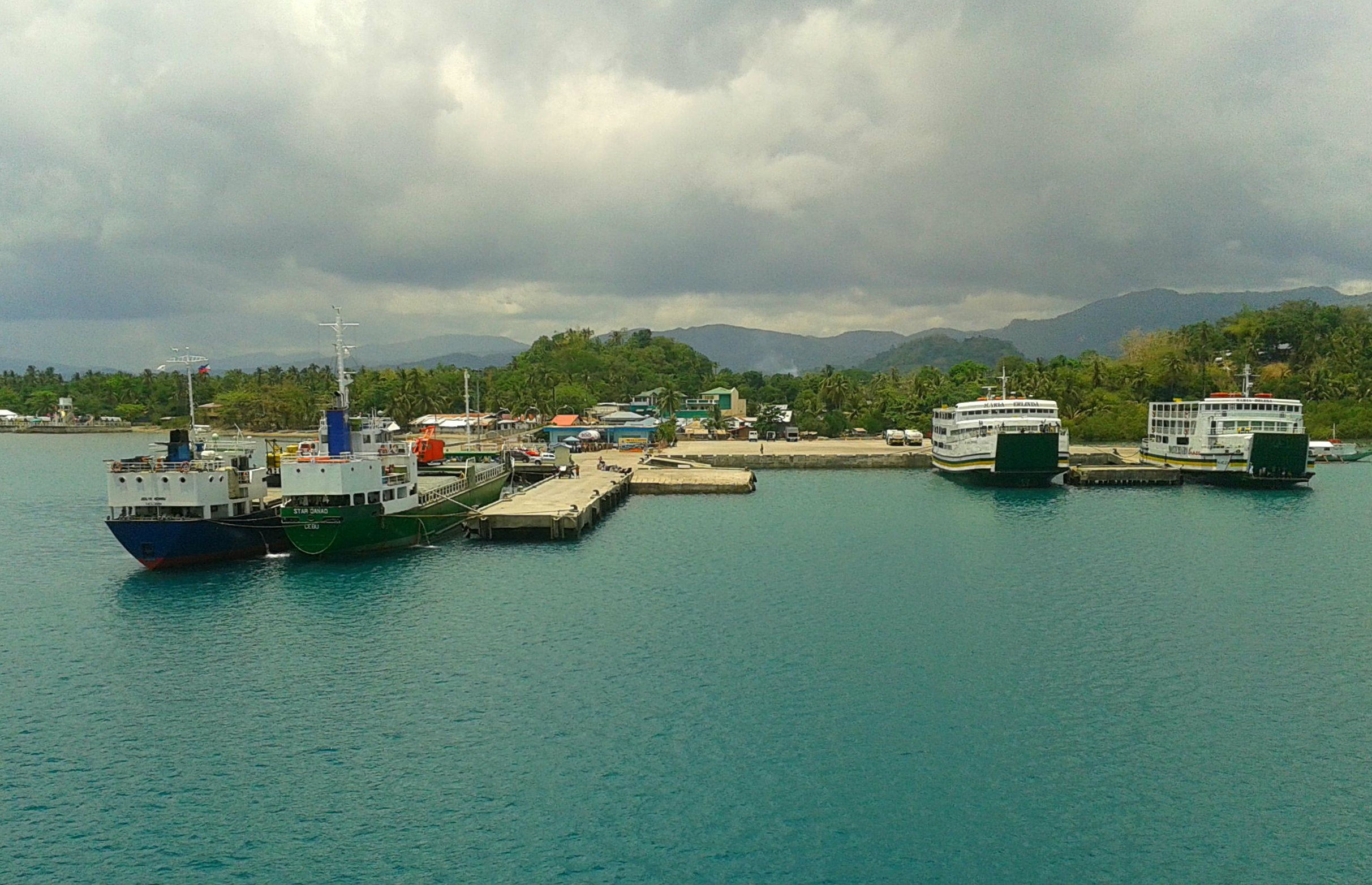
Poctoy Pier in Odiongan, the largest port in Romblon province

Romblon province is connected by a network of national and provincial roads. National roads form much of this network, with a total length of 311.046 kilometers (193.275 mi). Provincial roads, meanwhile, total 239.005 kilometers (148.511 mi) in length. Municipal and barangay roads in far-flung villages and island municipalities are not part of these figures. The primary modes of land transportation in the province are jeepneys, passenger motorcycles, minibuses and tricycles that serve inter-municipal movements and linkages.

Sea transportation is the primary mode of transportation linking Romblon with Luzon and islands in the Visayas. Inter-island ferries, RORO, and cargo ships from Manila, the southern Luzon ports of Batangas City, Lucena City in Quezon province, Roxas, Oriental Mindoro, and Roxas City in Capiz province are the primary modes of transportation linking the province to the rest of the country. Montenegro Lines, 2GO, and Romblon Shipping Lines all have ferry service from Manila to the main ports of entry of Odiongan and the capital town of Romblon and vice versa. From Romblon, Montenegro also serves Magdiwang in Sibuyan, while Romblon Shipping Lines also serves Cajidiocan. Pump boats and wooden launches also link the province to the towns of Buenavista, Marinduque and Pinamalayan, Oriental Mindoro. These pump boats are also used in going to barangays where there are no existing road networks or between municipalities in the province that do not have existing ferry service.

Tugdan Airport in Alcantara is the only airport in the province and is less than an hour away from Metro Manila by plane. As of February 2026, it is currently not being served by commercial flights from any domestic airlines but remains operational for private and chartered general aviation. The airport used to be served by Philippine flag carrier Philippine Airlines, domestic budget airline Cebu Pacific, and its subsidiary AirSWIFT.

=== Electricity ===
Power supply in Romblon is generated by the National Power Corporation (NPC) and serviced by two electric cooperatives. Tablas Island Electric Cooperative (TIELCO) serves the power needs of Tablas Island including San Jose. It operates a 5.070 MW diesel power plant in Odiongan and 1.740 MW power barge in San Agustin. The electric cooperative serves a total of 21,097 house connections. In 2013, TIELCO entered into a 15-year power supply agreement with Sunwest Water and Electric Company (SUWECO) to fill the island's energy needs. In 2015, SUWECO opened a diesel power plant in Barangay Batiano, Odiongan, which supplies TIELCO with 8.8 MW of electricity. In 2019, TIELCO and SUWECO inaugurated the 7.5 MW peak Tumingad Solar Power Plant in Odiongan. The two power plants supply electricity to the towns of Odiongan, San Andres, Calatrava, San Agustin, Santa Maria, Santa Fe, Alcantara, Looc, and Ferrol in Tablas. Likewise, TIELCO supplies electricity to San Jose and has recently held the bidding for the competitive selection process (CSP) for a new power provider to the island municipality.

Romblon Electric Cooperative (ROMELCO) supplies electricity to the capital town of Romblon through a 1.720 MW diesel power plant and a 1.30 MW power barge. It also serves Sibuyan Island using a 3.006 MW diesel power plant in San Fernando. ROMELCO has 5,288 house connections in Romblon and 5,150 house connections in the three municipalities located in Sibuyan Island or a total of 10,438 house connections in their franchise area. Additionally, ROMELCO installed in 2010 a mini hydro power plant in Cantigas, San Fernando, producing 900 kW of power. In 2019, ROMELCO also inaugurated the Romblon Wind Farm composed of three 300-kW wind turbines in Barangays Agnay, Bagacay and Lonos in Romblon, Romblon with a combined capacity to generate 2,000,100 kilowatt hours of green energy, or equivalent to 25 percent of the total annual energy requirement of the island. The 42-meter tall wind turbines were manufactured by Japanese company Komaihaltec Inc. and supported by the Ministry of the Environment of Japan. An additional 900-kW wind turbines will be installed in 2020. ROMELCO also provides 24-hour electricity to the island municipalities of Banton, Concepcion and Corcuera through diesel power plants operated by the NPC.

=== Water supply ===
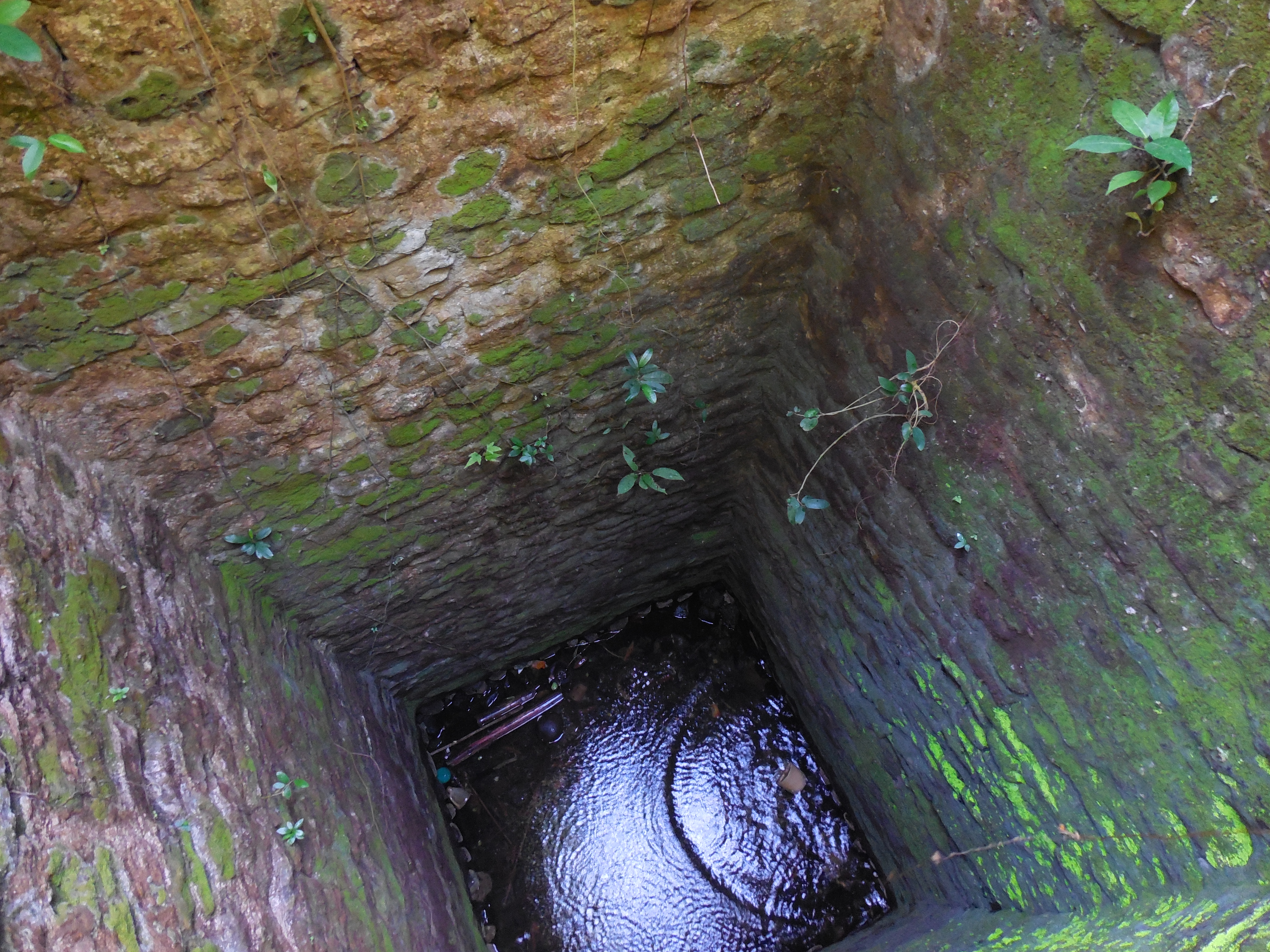
A Spanish-era well in Banton

Out of 17 municipalities, 14 have Level III water supply systems serving 18,590 households or about 32.57 percent of total provincial households. Level III has a reservoir with house-to-house connections. 5,252 households were serviced by Level II water systems and 24,700 households by Level I water systems. Level I category is a common facility where the community members get their water supply from deep wells and shallow wells, while Level II has a reservoir with a communal faucet. Based on a report from the Provincial Health Office in 2007, a total of 48,542 households out of the 57,079 or 85.04 percent have access to safe drinking water.

=== Healthcare ===
There are eight government-owned hospitals in Romblon that serve the local population's healthcare needs. Four of these hospitals are located in Tablas Island: the 75-bed, Romblon Provincial Hospital in Odiongan, the 25-bed Tablas Island District Hospital in San Agustin, the 25-bed Don Modesto Formilleza Sr. District Hospital in Looc, and the six-bed San Andres District Hospital in San Andres. Of these hospitals, only Romblon Provincial Hospital is a Level 1 hospital, which has an emergency room and intensive care unit. Two privately owned hospitals, the Tablas Doctors' Hospital and ISIAH Hospital and Medical Center, also operates in Odiongan. In Romblon, the 35-bed Romblon District Hospital provides the healthcare needs of residents in the capitol. It is the only other Level 1 hospital in the province after Romblon Provincial Hospital. In Sibuyan, the 25-bed Sibuyan District Hospital provides basic healthcare for the residents of the island's three municipalities. It opened in 1958 with the enactment of Republic Act No. 2400 by congressman Jose Moreno. There is also the 10-bed San Jose District Hospital in Carabao Island and the 10-bed Malipayon District Hospital in the town of Corcuera in Simara Island. Municipalities that do not have a district hospital or a Level 1 hospital are served by their respective rural health units.

=== Telecommunications ===
The province has several operating telecommunication exchanges, namely Kayumanggi, Romblontel, Odiongan Telephone Corporation (OTELCO), the Telecommunication Office (TELOF), telegram system, Liberty Telecom, public calling stations under the Department of Transportation (DOTr) and the Provincial Communication System (PCS) radio transceivers and receivers. Smart Communications, Sun Cellular and Globe Telecom already have relay stations in Romblon, Odiongan and Cajidiocan, enabling most areas province-wide connected through cellphones, except on some area where the signal is weak or non-existent because of mountains that block the signal. The Triple Peak in Santa Maria has a relay station for PLDT and Liberty Telecom.

== Media ==
There are four radio stations in the province, two of which are operated by the Radyo Natin Network and the other, 95.7 FMR Romblon owned by the Philippine Collective Media Corporation, GM FM 100.5 MHz owned by the Polytechnic Foundation of Cotabato and Asia and Radyo Natin Network operates the call sign DWMM at 104.5 MHz on FM radio from Looc, as well as the call sign DZVG 101.3 MHz on FM radio from Odiongan owned by Manila Broadcasting Company. As for print media, Romblon Text and Romblon Sun are the two major newspapers circulating in the province, aside from broadsheet and tabloid newspapers from Manila. Romblon News, meanwhile, provides provincial and national news and information via the web and social media.

A relay station for GMA Network and Romblon Community TV (affiliate of People's Television Network) in Santa Maria allows the province to access television shows broadcast by the network from Manila. There are also existing cable providers and local cable stations operating in several municipalities in the province, namely Romblon Cable Corporation (Romblon), Accutronics System Inc. (Odiongan), San Agustin Cable Antenna Corp. (San Agustin), Countryside Satellite Television System Inc. (Looc and Romblon), Gateway Cable TV Network (Calatrava), San Andres CATV Service Coop. (San Andres), Josefa J. Martinez CATV Services (Alcantara), Magdiwang Cable Television (Magdiwang), and Sibuyan Cable TV (San Fernando and Cajidiocan). Aside from these cable stations, there are also distributors of direct-to-home (DTH) satellite TV such as Cignal Digital TV, Dream Satellite TV, G Sat, and Sky Direct who provide television services for its subscribers.

== Education ==
The Division of Romblon of the Department of Education (DepEd) supervises and oversees the delivery of education and operations of public schools in the province. It is composed of 13 districts, where there are 228 elementary schools, 216 of which are public and 12 are private. Of the 216 public elementary schools, 162 offer preschool education, while 20 of the private schools have the same offering. There are also 10 private preschools offering pre-elementary. For secondary level, a total of 44 schools offer secondary education, of which 37 are public schools and seven are private institutions. The Virginia Centurione Bracelli School offers both primary and secondary education. There are 13 vocational schools in the province, while tertiary education is offered by privately owned Romblon College and the Romblon State University (RSU), one of the oldest state universities in the Philippines. RSU, which was founded in 1915, is the oldest agricultural university in the Philippines and has campuses in Romblon, Odiongan, Cajidiocan, Calatrava, San Agustin, San Andres, San Fernando, Santa Fe, and Santa Maria.

== Notable people ==
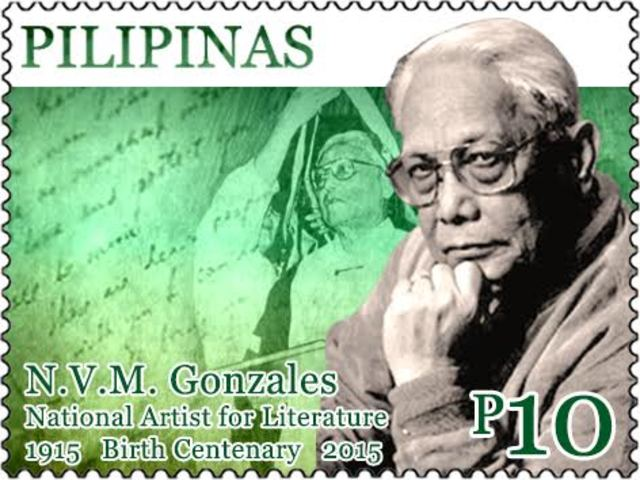
National Artist for Literature N. V. M. Gonzalez

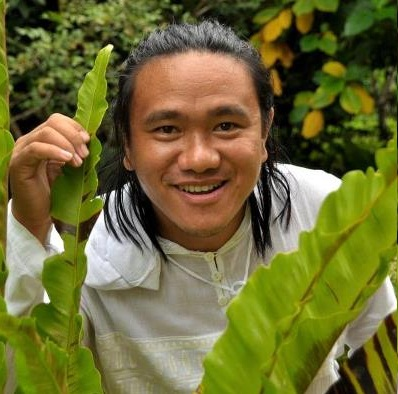
Environmental activist Rodne Galicha

- Fitch Arboleda, Filipino footballer who plays for Kaya-Iloilo and the Philippines national football team.
- Florante Condes, Filipino professional boxer and a former IBF Minimumweight World Champion.
- Jose Dalisay, Jr., writer, poet, playwright and screenwriter who won 16 Palanca Awards. He is a recipient of 1993 Ten Outstanding Young Men (TOYM) award.
- Gabriel Fabella, co-founder and first president of the Philippine Historical Association; Father of the June 12 Independence Day movement; and sole representative of Romblon in the First National Assembly (1935–1938).
- Ephraim Fajutagana, former Obispo Máximo or Supreme Bishop of the Philippine Independent Church.
- Buenaventura Famadico, fourth Bishop of San Pablo in Laguna and second Bishop of Gumaca in Quezon Province.
- Seth Fedelin, actor, model, singer and dancer who first appeared on television as a housemate on the reality show Pinoy Big Brother: Otso (2018) and has since appeared in various films and television series alongside his love team partner Andrea Brillantes.
- Roilo Golez, former member of the Philippine House of Representatives representing the Second District of Parañaque. He is a recipient of 1982 Ten Outstanding Young Men (TOYM) award.
- N. V. M. Gonzalez, writer, Palanca Award winner, and National Artist for Literature.
- Dinualdo Gutierrez, Filipino prelate of the Roman Catholic Church and bishop of the Diocese of Marbel from 1982 to 2018.
- Elma Muros-Posadas, former track and field athlete who specialized in long jump and won a total of 15 gold medals in several Southeast Asian Games.
- Rodne Galicha, environmentalist, 2018 Ten Outstanding Young Men (TOYM) awardee and recipient of national individual award for Gawad Bayani Kalikasan given by the Center for Environmental Concerns and Department of Environment and Natural Resources, former Philippine country manager of The Climate Reality Project.
- Jansen Rios, Filipino professional basketball player for the NLEX Road Warriors of the Philippine Basketball Association (PBA).
- Renato Solidum Jr., Filipino geologist who is the former director the Philippine Institute of Volcanology and Seismology (PHIVOLCS) and the ninth Secretary of Science and Technology of the Philippines.
- Nene Tamayo, grand winner of ABS-CBN's Pinoy Big Brother (season 1).
- Mel Rey Uy, fifth Bishop of Lucena, Quezon Province.
