= Romblon College =

Defunct private college in Romblon, Philippines

Romblon College was a private college located in barangay Liwayway in Odiongan, Romblon. It was founded in 1948. Its president was Nellie G. De Castro.

== Programs Offered ==
- Bachelor of Arts

Bachelor of Elementary Education

- Bachelor of Secondary Education
- 1 yr. General Clerical Course
- Associate in Computer Science
- 1 yr. Nursing Aide
- 2 yr. Computer Programming
- 2 yr. Food Prep and Service Technology
- 2 yr. Nursing Aide
- 2 yr. Office Management with Computer
- 2 yr. Police Science
- 2 yr. Tourism and Travel Specialist
- Complete Secondary Course (High school)
