= Montenegro Lines =

Batangas based shipping company

Montenegro Shipping Lines Inc. (MSLI)

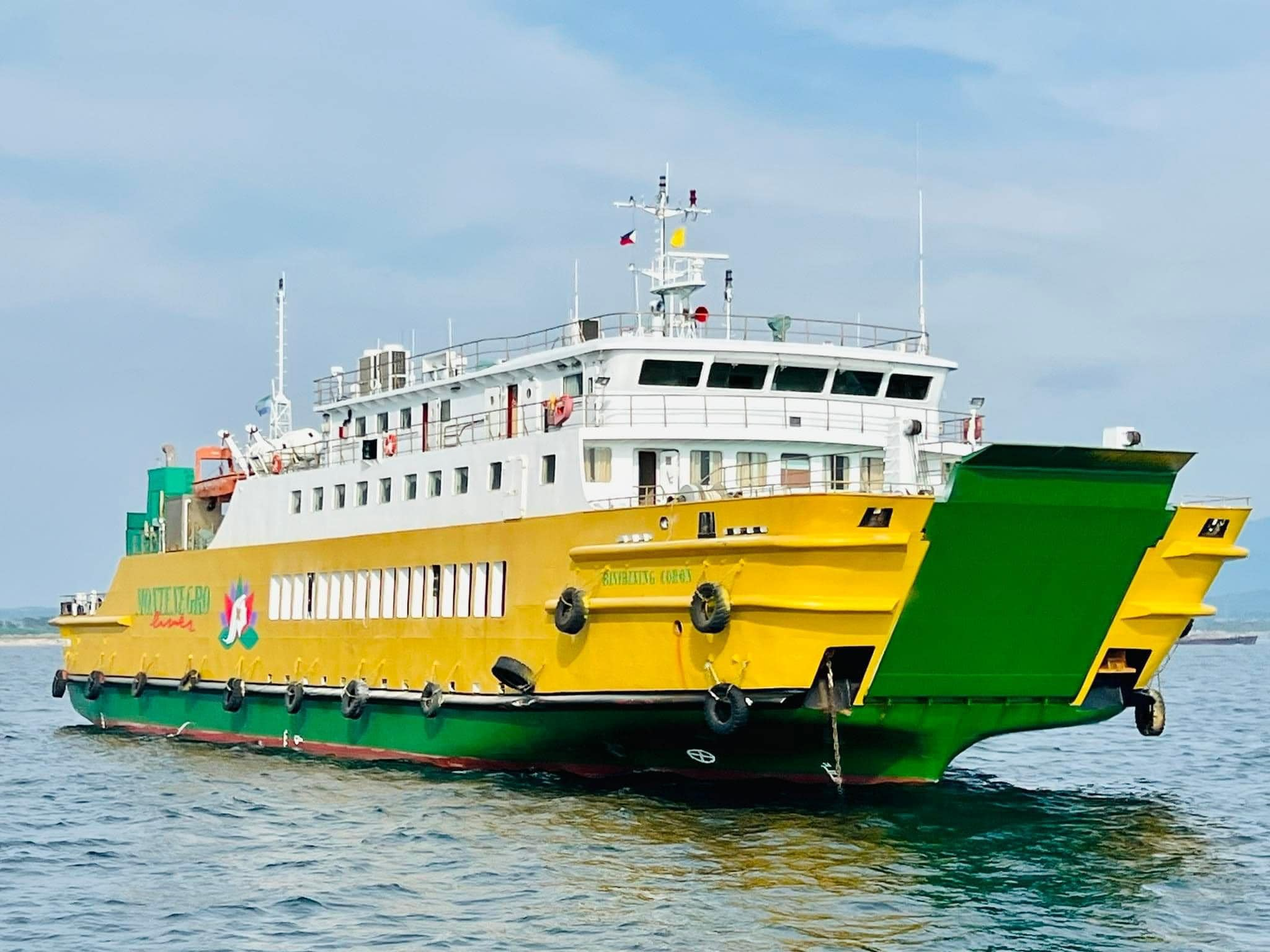
- Type: Private
- Industry: Shipping
- Founded: 1978; 48 years ago
- Founder: Vicente L. Montenegro Sr.
- Headquarters: Montenegro Corporate Center, Diversion Road, Barangay Bolbok, Batangas City, Philippines
- Area served: Philippines
- Key people: Vicente C. Montenegro Jr. (General manager)
- Subsidiaries: San Pedro Shipyard Corporation; Montenegro Marine; Roro Bus Transport
- Website: montenegrolines.com.ph

Montenegro Shipping Lines Inc. (MSLI) is a Philippine domestic shipping line based at Batangas City, Philippines. The office is located at Montenegro Corporate office, along Bolbok Diversion Road, Bolbok Batangas City. It operates passenger, cargo and RORO vessels to various destinations in the Philippines under the brands Montenegro Lines and Marina Ferries.

== History ==
Montenegro Shipping Lines, Inc. was established on 16 September 1978 by entrepreneur Vicente Leyco Montenegro, Sr., a pioneer in commercial and public transportation in the Philippines. The first route that the company served is from Batangas City to Abra de Ilog, Occidental Mindoro using the boat MV Malaya. Over the past 40 years, MSLI provided passenger and commercial marine transportation services (cargo or vehicles) with a fleet of fast ferries and RORO vessels to 13 ports in the Philippines. In 2010, the company acquired eight additional RORO vessels worth PH₱1 billion from the Development Bank of the Philippines' Maritime Leasing Corporation and other lenders. By 2012, the company operated over 30 vessels on its fleet of passenger, cargo, and RORO vessels throughout Luzon and Visayas. As of 2020, the company has 59 vessels calling on 34 ports across the Philippines. Moreover, the company has a controlling stake over RORO Bus Transport Services Inc., a Philippine bus company that transports passengers to different destinations in the Philippines via the Strong Republic Nautical Highway.

In 2019, MSLI became a member of the Philippine Coastwise Shipping Association (PCSA), the biggest shipping group in the Philippines.

== Destinations ==
As of 2025, Montenegro Shipping Lines has 69 destinations. Montenegro Lines serves the following destinations:

- Batangas City
- Mabini, Batangas
- Tingloy, Batangas
- Abra de Ilog, Occidental Mindoro
- San Jose, Occidental Mindoro
- Magsaysay, Occidental Mindoro (Santa Teresa)
- Puerto Galera, Oriental Mindoro
- Calapan City, Oriental Mindoro
- Bulalacao, Oriental Mindoro
- Roxas, Oriental Mindoro
- Boracay Island
- Malay, Aklan (Caticlan)
- Nabas, Aklan
- Buruanga, Aklan
- Caluya, Antique (Semirara Island)
- Iloilo City
- Dumangas, Iloilo
- Bacolod
- Dumaguete City, Negros Oriental
- Dapitan City
- Larena, Siquijor
- Siquijor, Siquijor
- Odiongan, Romblon
- Romblon, Romblon
- Banton, Romblon
- Calatrava, Romblon
- San Agustin, Romblon
- Magdiwang, Romblon
- Odiongan, Romblon
- Corcuera, Romblon (Simara Island)
- Lucena City
- Mogpog, Marinduque
- Santa Cruz, Marinduque
- Masbate City
- Cataingan, Masbate
- Batuan, Masbate (Lagundi)
- Aroroy, Masbate
- Pio Duran, Albay
- Pilar, Sorsogon
- Surigao City (Lipata)
- San Ricardo, Southern Leyte (Benit)
- Cuyo, Palawan
- Culion, Palawan
- Coron, Palawan
- Puerto Princesa City
- El Nido, Palawan
- San Jose, Dinagat Islands
- Dapa, Surigao del Norte
- Allen, Northern Samar (Dapdap)
- Matnog, Sorsogon
- Bogo City, Cebu
- Bongao, Tawi-Tawi
- Zamboanga City
- Jolo, Sulu
- Isabela City, Basilan
- Lamitan City, Basilan
- Toledo City, Cebu
- San Carlos City, Negros Occidental
- Escalante City, Negros Occidental
- Cebu City
- Bogo City, Cebu
- Tabuelan, Cebu
- Caluya, Antique
- Palompon, Leyte
- Jordan, Guimaras
- Castilla, Sorsogon
- Lipata, Surigao
- Maya, Daanbantayan, Cebu
- Saint Bernard, Southern Leyte

== Vessels ==
Montenegro Lines has a total of 90 operating vessels and two more under construction. Montenegro Lines operates the following vessels as of October 2026:

=== Tugboats ===
- MT Montenegro Tugboat
- MT Montenegro Tugboat 2

=== Maria Series ===
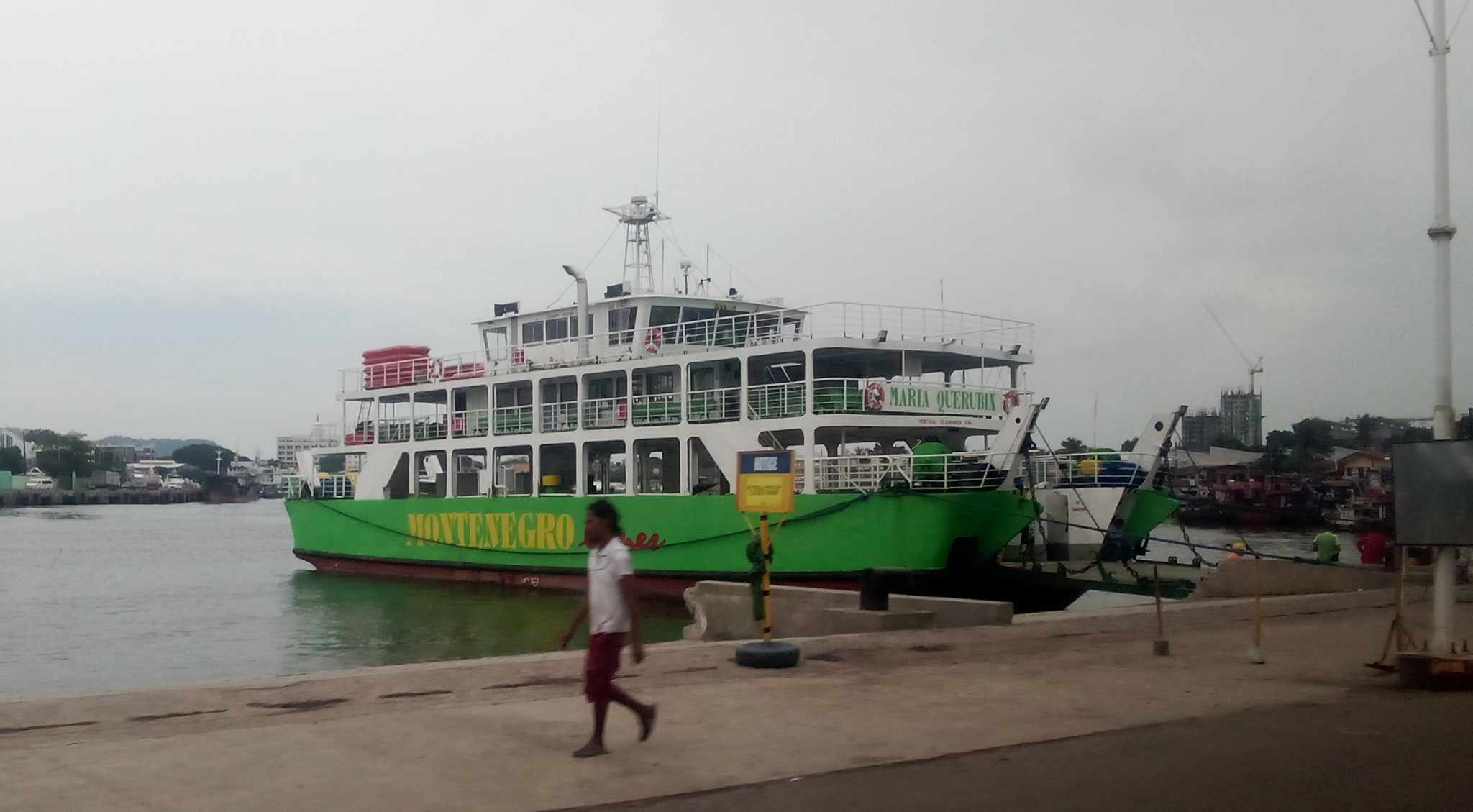
MV Maria Querubin

- MV Maria Angela
- MV Maria Beatriz
- MV Maria Diana
- MV Maria Erlinda
- MV Maria Felisa
- MV Maria Gloria
- MV Maria Helena
- MV Maria Isabel
- MV Maria Josefa
- MV Marie Kristina
- MV Maria Lolita
- MV Maria Matilde
- MV Maria Natasha
- MV Maria Oliva
- MV Maria Querubin
- MV Maria Rebecca
- MV Maria Sophia
- MV Marie Teresa
- MV Maria Ursula
- MV Maria Vanessa
- MV Maria Wynona
- MV Maria Xenia
- MV Maria Yasmina
- MV Maria Zenaida

=== Fast-crafts ===
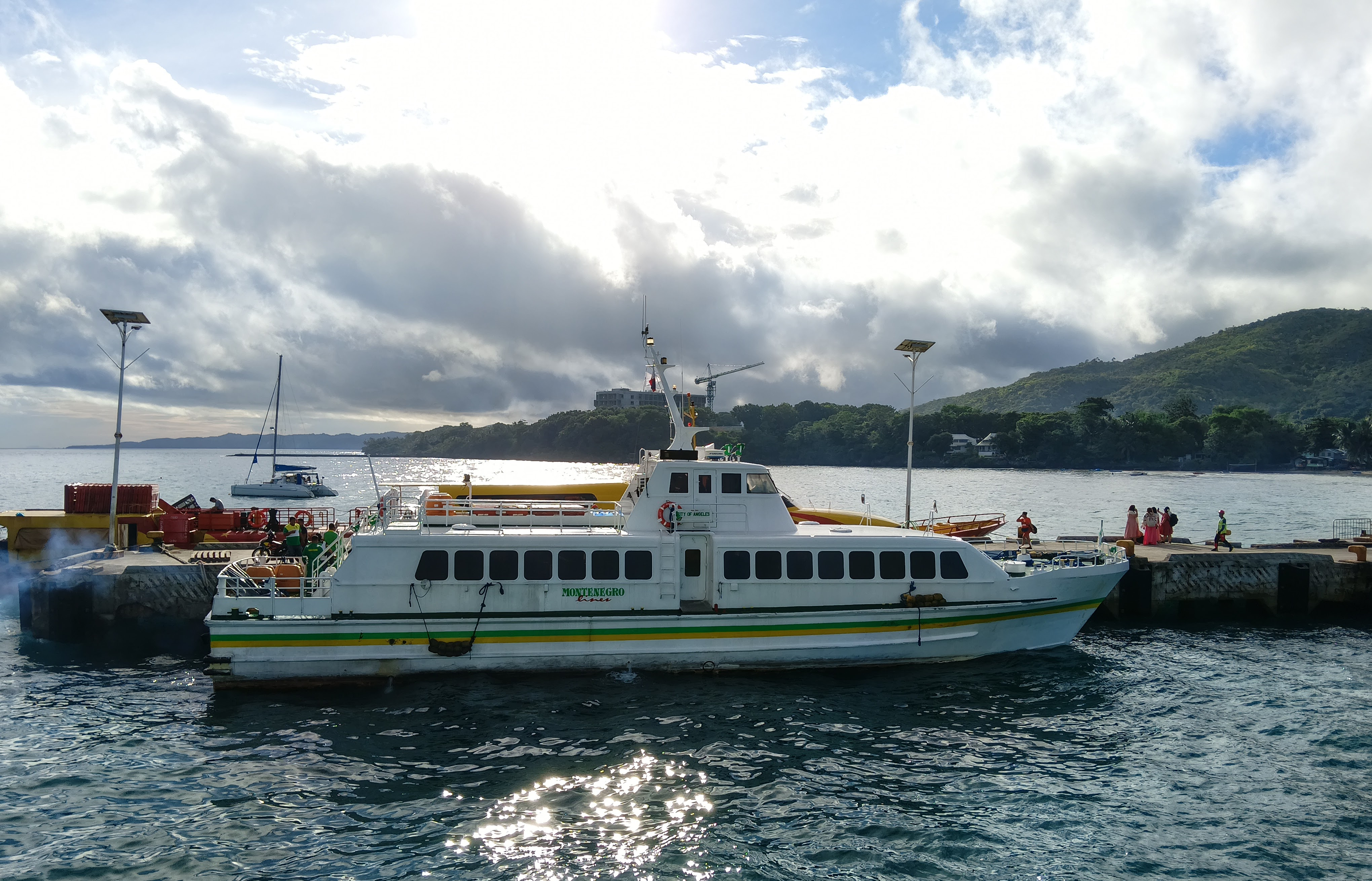
FC City of Angeles

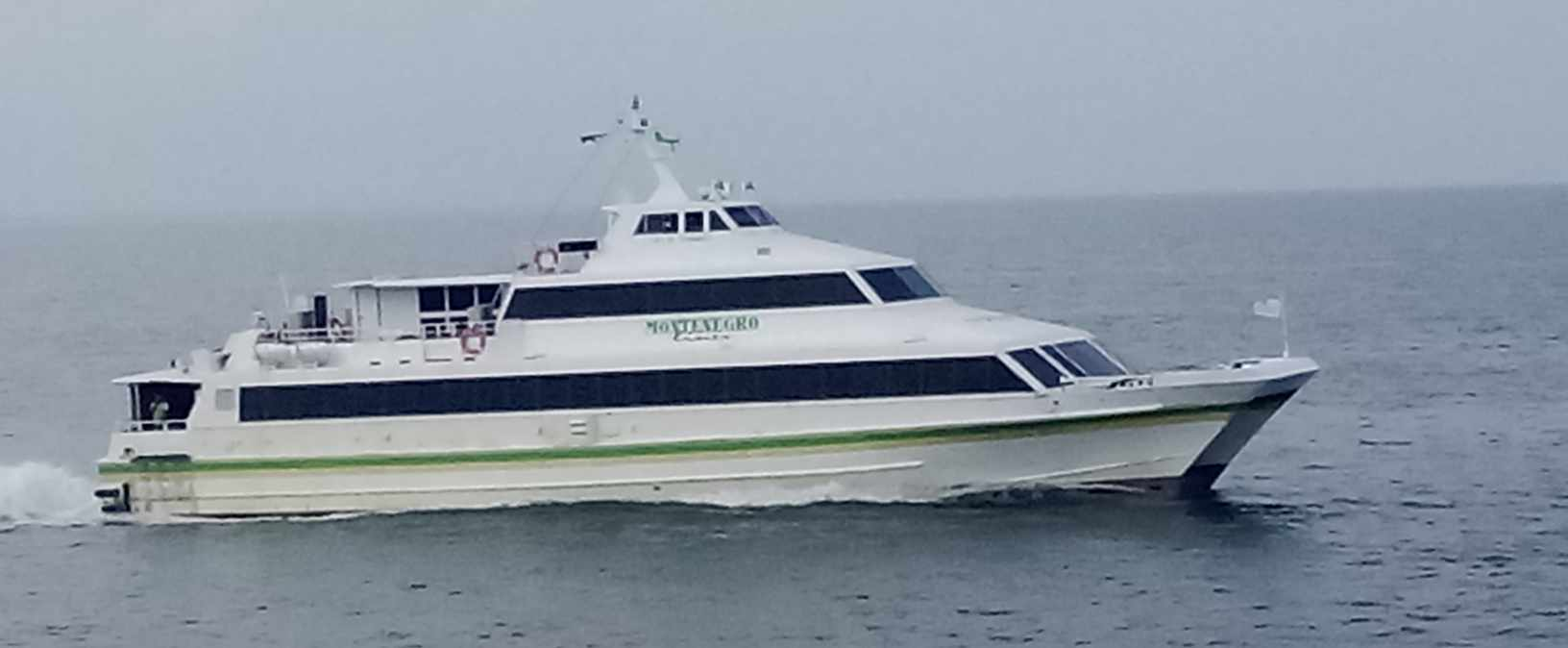
FC City of Zamboanga

- MV City of Angeles
- MV City of Bacolod
- MV City of Calapan
- MV City of Dapitan
- MV City of Escalante
- MV City of General Santos
- MV City of Himamaylan
- MV City Of Iloilo
- MV City of Kabankalan
- MV City of Lucena
- MV City of Masbate
- MV City of Naga
- MV City of Ozamiz
- MV City of Roxas
- MV City of Sorsogon
- MV City of Tabaco
- MV City of Vigan
- MV City of Zamboanga

=== Reina Series ===
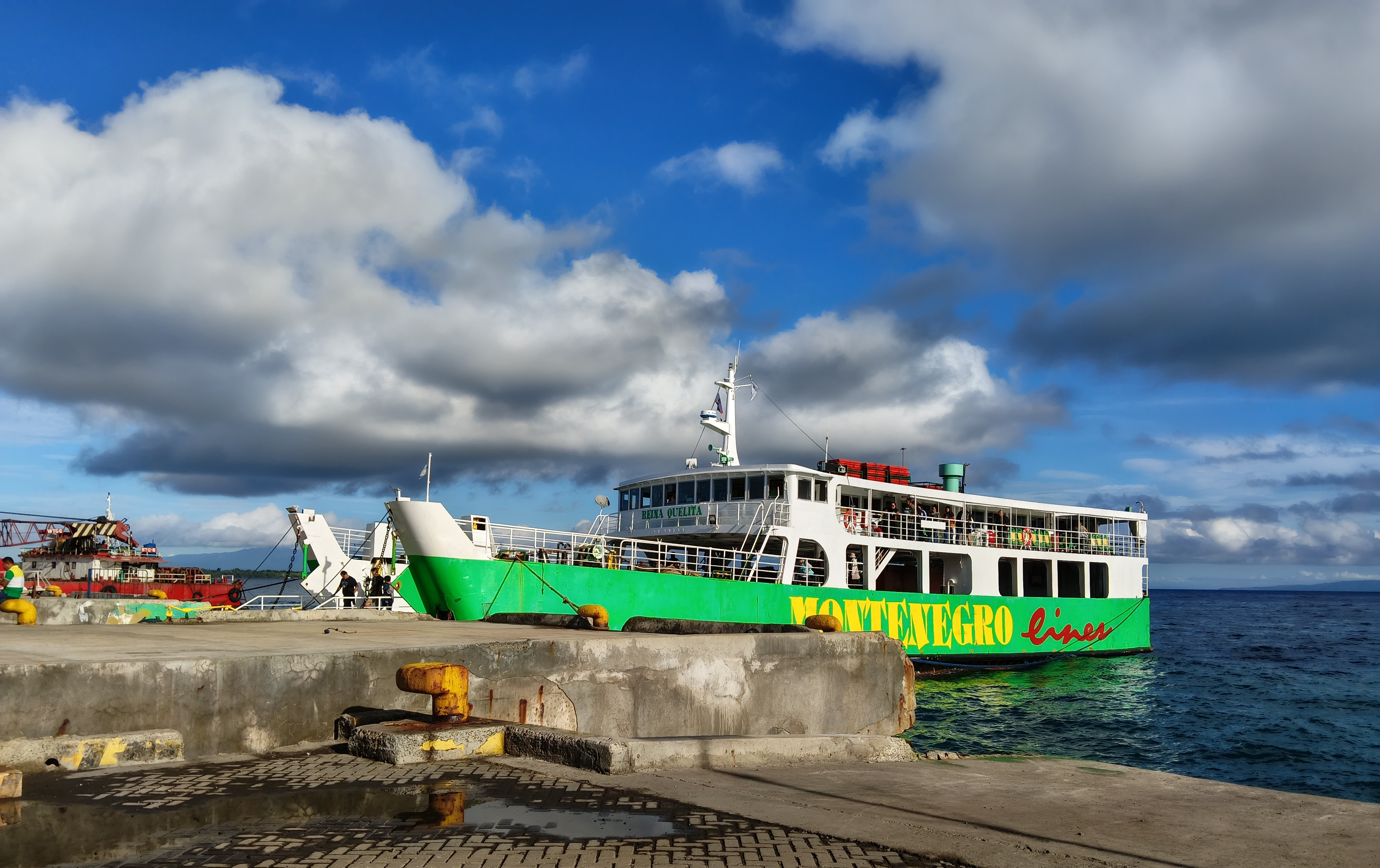
MV Reina Quelita

- MV Reina Delos Angeles
- MV Reina Banderada
- MV Reina Divinagracia
- MV Reina Del Cielo
- MV Reina Delos Flores
- MV Reina Emperatriz
- MV Reina Genoveva
- MV Reina Justisya
- MV Reina Hosanna
- MV Reina Immaculada
- MV Reina Kleopatra
- MV Reina De Luna
- MV Reina Magdalena
- MV Reina Neptuna
- MV Reina Olympia
- MV Reina Quelita
- MV Reina Del Rosario
- MV Reina Sentenciada
- MV Reina Timotea
- MV Reina Urduja
- MV Reina Veronica
- MV Reina Wilhelmina
- MV Reina Xaviera
- MV Reina Yvonne
- MV Reina Zadia

=== Santa Series ===
- MV Santa Alberta
- MV Santa Brigida
- MV Santa Carmelita
- MV Santa Dorothea
- MV Santa Editha
- MV Santa Faustina
- MV Santa Juliana
- MV Santa Margarita
- MV Santa Soledad
- MV Santa Rita (to enter service in 2027)
- MV Santa Victoria (to enter service in 2027)

=== Binibini Series ===
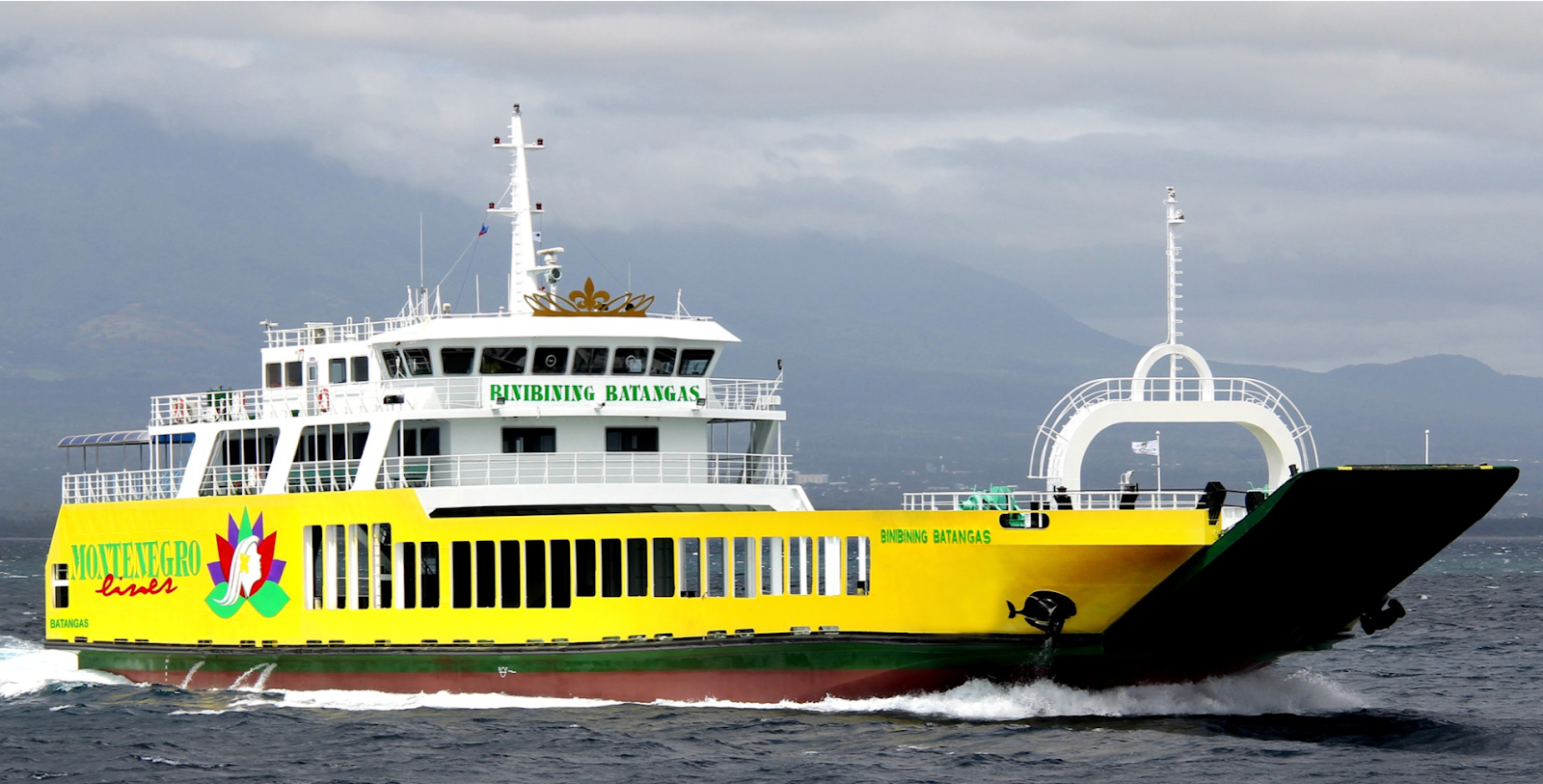
MV Binibining Batangas

- MV Binibining Abra De Ilog
- MV Binibining Batangas
- MV Binibining Coron
- MV Binibining Dumaguete
- MV Binibining Surigao
- MV Binibining Matnog
- MV Binibining Jolo
- MV Binibining Liloan
- MV Binibining Isabela (New Vessel)
- MV Binibining Romblon
- MV Binibining Odiongan

== Incidents and accidents ==
- On 11 April 2002, a fire broke out on the cargo hold of MV Maria Carmela as it sailed from Masbate City to Lucena, causing it to sink. The incident, which happened of the coast of Pagbilao, Quezon, killed 39 people, while 371 individuals survived.
- On 17 March 2017, 88 passengers and 26 crew members onboard MV Reina Hossana were rescued by the Philippine Coast Guard after a fire broke out onboard. The vessel was traveling from Calapan to Batangas City when the incident happened. The fire was eventually put out and the vessel was towed to Batangas City. Another MSLI vessel, MV Reina Divinagracia, which was sent from Calapan to help rescue the passengers and crew of MV Reina Hossana, ran aground in the vicinity of Balahibong Manok Island in Tingloy, Batangas. All of its 104 passengers and 20 crew were rescued, while the vessel was freed from its location and towed to port.
- On 1 April 2017, MV Maria Oliva suffered loss of power to its engines while en route from San Ricardo, Southern Leyte to Surigao City, Surigao del Norte. The vessel floated without power for 10 hours until a Philippine Coast Guard vessel arrived and rescued the 264 individuals onboard. Another civilian vessel arrived and towed the vessel to Lipata Port in Surigao City.
- On 26 September 2017, 87 people were injured when MV Maria Matilde rammed into a rock formation in the vicinity of Calatrava, Romblon due to a steering problem. The vessel was traveling from Odiongan to Romblon, Romblon when the incident happened. The vessel safely reached its destination but sustained severe damage to its bow.
- On May 27, 2023, MV Reina Xaviera was aground incident in Dapa, Surigao del Norte due to strong winds result to aground in the low tide area effects of Typhoon Betty are enter in the Philippine Area of Responsibility and on June 5, 2023 was aground again for second times due to Low Tide depart 5:00 pm from Port of Dapa bound to Surigao City MARINA suspend the Cargo Ship Safety Certificate of said vessel.
- On July 16, 2023, MV Maria Helena ran aground and tilted to its portside off the coast of Banton Island while en route from Lucena, Quezon to San Agustin, Romblon. The ferry ran aground as a result of the rough seas which caused the ferry to wobble quite slowly. The momentum of the wobbling caused a heavy truck to fall down towards the left, causing the ferry to run aground and tilt toward its left.
- On February 11, 2024, MV Reina Hosanna ran aground incident in Capul, Northern Samar due to Engine failure resulted to aground due to strong wind and currents in the shoreline in Barangay 1 on the said Municipality. The distressed vessel also carried 16 light cars, two small trucks, a trailer, and eight 10-wheel trucks from Matnog, Sorsogon. There was no reported water ingress into the vessel and all crew members were in good condition, according to the Philippine Coast Guard (PCG). Personnel from PCG, local police, fire officers and local emergency responders safely rescued all the passengers using water rafts.
- On 11 November 2024, MV Maria Oliva ran aground in shallow waters near Romblon Port, Romblon, Philippines. The vessel was carrying 156 passengers, 38 crew members, and 26 rolling cargo vehicles at the time of the incident. All passengers were safely evacuated with the assistance of the Philippine Coast Guard and local authorities. No injuries or fatalities were reported, and no oil spill was recorded. An investigation was conducted to determine the cause of the grounding.

== See also ==
- List of shipping companies in the Philippines
- 2GO Travel
- Starlite Ferries
- SuperCat
- Roble Shipping Inc.
- Cokaliong Shipping Lines
- Lite Ferries
