= Romblomanon language =

Bisayan language spoken in the Philippines

Romblomanon
- Ini
- Native to: Philippines
- Region: Romblon province (entire Romblon and Sibuyan islands; some parts of Tablas except Banton, Corcuera, Maestro de Ocampo and Carabao)
- Native speakers: 94,000 (2011)
- Language family: Austronesian: Malayo-Polynesian; Philippine; Central Philippine; Bisayan; Central Bisayan; Romblomanon

Language codes
- ISO 639-3: rol
- Glottolog: romb1245
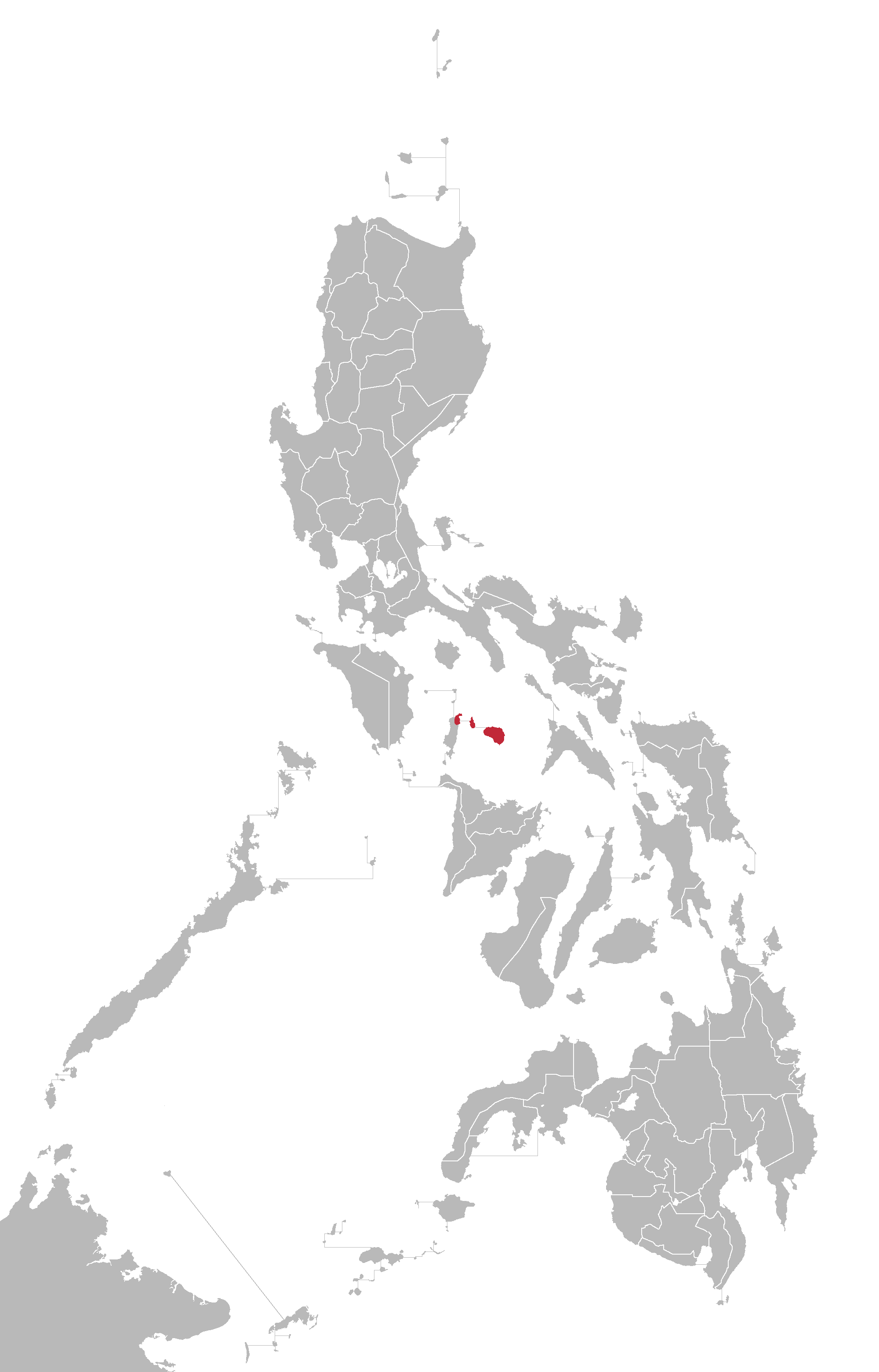
- Area where Romblomanon is spoken

Romblomanon or Bisaya/Binisaya nga Romblomanon is an Austronesian regional language spoken, along with Asi and Onhan, in the province of Romblon in the Philippines. The language is also called Ini, Tiyad Ini, Basi, Niromblon, and Sibuyanon. It is a part of the Bisayan language family and is closely related to other Philippine languages.

== Geographic distribution ==
Specifically, Romblomanon is spoken in the following islands on Romblon:

- Romblon: the sole municipality of Romblon.
- Sibuyan: all its municipalities, Cajidiocan variant, Magdiwang variant, and San Fernando variant.
- Tablas: the municipality of San Agustin.
- Oriental Mindoro: migrant Romblomanon speakers from Carmen in Tablas brought the language particularly to the municipality of Bansud and also migrant Romblomanon speakers from Tablas, Romblon and Sibuyan islands to the municipalities of Mansalay, Bulalacao and parts of Bongabong and Roxas respectively.

== Phonology ==
=== Consonants ===
| | | Labial | Alveolar | Palatal | Velar | Glottal |
|---|---|---|---|---|---|---|
| Nasal | | m | n | | ŋ | |
| Plosive | voiceless | p | t | | k | ʔ |
| Plosive | voiced | b | d | | ɡ | ʔ |
| Fricative | | | s | | | h |
| Rhotic | | | ɾ | | | |
| Lateral | | | l | | | |
| Approximant | | w | | j | | |

Romblomanon is one of the Philippine languages that do not exhibit [ɾ]–[d] allophony.

=== Vowels ===
| | Front | Central | Back |
|---|---|---|---|
| Close | i | | u |
| Open | | a | |

- Phonetic variations of /i, u/ with sounds [e, o] are said to occur.

== Grammar ==
=== Pronouns ===
==== Personal ====
| | Absolutive | Ergative | Oblique |
|---|---|---|---|
| 1st person singular | ako | nakon, ko | akon |
| 2nd person singular | ikaw, ka | nimo, mo | imo |
| 3rd person singular | siya | niya | iya |
| 1st person plural inclusive | kita | naton | aton |
| 1st person plural exclusive | kami | namon | amon |
| 2nd person plural | kamo | nindo | indo |
| 3rd person plural | sinda | ninda | inda |

==== Demonstrative pronouns ====
| | Absolutive | Ergative/Oblique | Locative | Existential |
|---|---|---|---|---|
| Nearest to speaker ('this, here') | iní | tiyadní | dirí | (y)ári |
| Near to addressee or closely removed from speaker and addressee ('that, there') | inâ | tiyadnâ | dirâ | (y)ára' |
| Remote ('yon, yonder') | adtó | tiyadtó | didtó | (y)á(d)to |

In addition to this, there are two verbal deictics, karí, meaning 'come to speaker', and kadto, meaning 'to go yonder'.

=== Interrogative words ===
| Romblomanon | English | Example |
|---|---|---|
| Ano | What | Ano imo pangayan? 'What is your name?' |
| San-o | When | San-o ka makadto sa Romblon? 'When are you going to Romblon?' |
| Diin | Where | Diin ka pa-kadto? 'Where are you going?' |
| Sin-o | Who | Sin-o ang imo ka-ibahan? 'Who is your companion?' |
| Kamusta | How | Kamusta ka? 'How are you?' |
| Pa-unó | How (a derivative of ano) | Pa-anó ka maka halin? 'How can you go?' |
| Pila | How much / How many | Pila ini? 'How much is this?' / Pila ka tawo ang yara? 'How many people are there?' |

== Examples ==
=== Numbers ===
| Number | Romblomanon |
|---|---|
| 1 | Isá |
| 2 | Duhá |
| 3 | Tuyó |
| 4 | Upat |
| 5 | Limá |
| 6 | Onum |
| 7 | Pitó |
| 8 | Wayó |
| 9 | Siyám |
| 10 | Napúyô |
| 100 | Isa-kagatús |
| 1000 | Isa-kalibó |
| First | Una |
| Second | Panga-duhá |
| Third | Pang-tuyó / Pangat-lo |
| Fourth | Pang-upat |
| Fifth | Pang-limá |
| Sixth | Pang-onum |
| Seventh | Pang-pitó |
| Eighth | Pang-wayó |
| Ninth | Pang-siyám |
| Tenth | Pang-napúyô |

=== Common expressions ===
| Romblomanon / Sibuyanon dialect (San Fernando) | Aklanon | Tagalog | English |
|---|---|---|---|
| Ambo/ilaga (Sibuyan) | Eanggam | Daga | Rat |
| Asó | Aso | Usok | Smoke |
| Ayam/ajam (Sibuyan) | Ayam | Aso | Dog |
| Ayaw mag pinisik / Ajaw mag pinisik (Sibuyan) | Indi ka maglandi | Huwag kang malandi | Don't flirt |
| Babaye/baje (Sibuyan) | Bayi | Babae | Female |
| Bu-ang | Kumangon | Baliw | Crazy |
| Bukon, indi | Bukon, indi | Hindi | No |
| Bulan/buyan (Sibuyan) | Buean | Buwan | Month |
| Bungoy | Bungoe | Bingi | Deaf |
| Buroy | Badwan | Bobo | Dumb |
| Buta | Bueag | Bulag | Blind |
| Buwas | Hin-aga | Bukas | Tomorrow |
| Hadakon, hambugon | Bugaeon | Mayabang | Boastful |
| Hadlok | Hadlok | Takot | Afraid |
| Mus na | Mali eon, mosyon eon | Tara na | Let's go |
| Hangit ako sa imo | Hangit ako kimo | Galit ako sa iyo | I hate you |
| Higko/higtang (Sibuyan) | Higko | Dumi | Dirt |
| Hu-o | Hu-o | Oo | Yes |
| Ibabaw | Ibabaw | Itaas | Up |
| Idayum | Idaeum | Ilalim | Down |
| Kabu-ot ka / Kabuoton ka (Sibuyan) | Mabu-ot ka | Mabait ka | You are kind |
| Ka-guapa ka / Kaguapahon ka (Sibuyan) | Gwapa ka | Maganda ka | You are beautiful |
| Ka-guapo ka / Kaguapuhon ka (Sibuyan) | Gwapo ka | Gwapo ka | You are handsome |
| Kalag | Kaeag | Kaluluwa | Spirit |
| Galaum/gasi | Ea-um | Akala | Assumption |
| Kanam | Hampang | Laro | Play |
| Kwarta | Kwarta | Salapi | Money |
| Layaki/yaki (Sibuyan) | Eaki | Lalaki | Male |
| Maayo nga adlaw / Maajo na Adlaw (Sibuyan) | Maayad-ayad nga adlaw | Magandang araw | Good day |
| Maayo nga aga / Maajo na Aga (Sibuyan) | Maayad-ayad nga agahon | Magandang umaga | Good morning |
| Maayo nga gabi-i / Maajo na Gab-i (Sibuyan) | Maayad-ayad nga gabi-i | Magandang gabi | Good evening |
| Maayo nga hapon / Maajo na Hapon (Sibuyan) | Maayad-ayad nga hapon | Magandang hapon | Good afternoon |
| Mabinuligon | Mabinuligon | Matulungin | Helpful |
| Madamo nga salamat | Maabo nga saeamat | Maraming salamat | Thanks a lot |
| Magdahan ka | Magdahan ka/Maghaeong ka | Mag-ingat ka | Take care |
| Mahuga | Malisud | Mahirap | Difficult |
| Mahugod/mapisan (Sibuyan) | Mahugod | Masipag | Industrious |
| Maisog/kaisugon (Sibuyan) | Maisog | Matapang | Brave |
| Makusog/kakusugon (Sibuyan) | Mabaskog | Malakas | Strong |
| Mala-in/kalainon (Sibuyan) | Maea-in | Masama | Bad |
| Malipay | Malipayon | Masaya | Happy |
| Maluya/maluja (Sibuyan) | Mahinay | Mabagal | Slow |
| Manamit/kanamiton (Sibuyan) | Manami | Masarap | Delicious |
| Manang | Manang | Ate | Older sister |
| Manong | Manong | Kuya | Older brother |
| Mayad/majad (Sibuyan) | Mayad | Matalino | Intelligent |
| Merkado | Tindahan | Pamilihan | Market |
| O-ning/kuring (Sibuyan) | Kuring | Pusa | Cat |
| Palangga ta gid ikaw | Palangga ko gid ikaw | Mahal na mahal kita | I love you so much |
| Palangga ta ikaw | Palangga ko ikaw | Mahal kita | I love you |
| Pisikon/pisikan | Mala | Malandi | Flirtatious |
| Pusong/bakakon | Purilon | Sinungaling | Liar |
| Semana | Dominggo | Linggo | Week |
| Sinsilyo | Sinsilyo | Barya | Coins |
| Subay | Guyom, tigasaw | Langgam | Ant |
| Tubi | Tubi | Tubig | Water |
| Tu-ig | Dag-on | Taon | Year |
| Tu-o | Tu-o | Kanan | Right |
| Waya/waja (Sibuyan) | Waea | Kaliwa | Left |
| Yawa/jawa (Sibuyan) | Yawa | Kasamaan | Demon |
