= Calatrava, Romblon =

Municipality in Romblon, Philippines

Calatrava
- Municipality
- Municipality of Calatrava
- Poblacion, with the island of Corcuera in the background

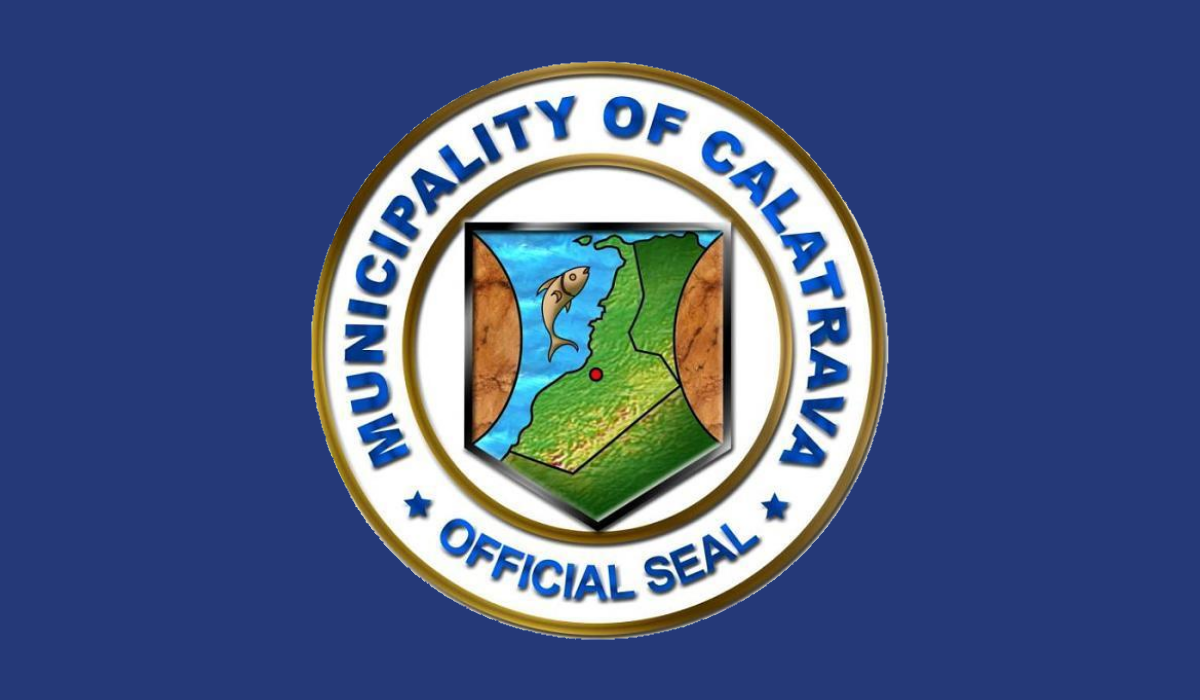
- Flag Seal

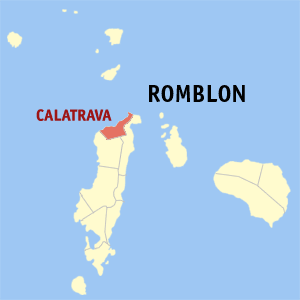
- Map of Romblon with Calatrava highlighted
- Interactive map of Calatrava
- Location within the Philippines
- Coordinates: 12°37′00″N 122°04′15″E
- Country: Philippines
- Region: Mimaropa
- Province: Romblon
- District: Lone district
- Founded: 1810
- Barangays: 7 (see Barangays)

Government
  - Type: Sangguniang Bayan
  - Mayor: Robert "Bong" M. Fabella
  - Vice Mayor: Elizer F. Fiedacan
  - Representative: Eleandro Jesus F. Madrona
  - Councilors: Herbert Falcutila; Dilbert Motin; Carlo Fetalvero; Obet Fesalbon; Monching Magbata; Merlito Sixon; Vonn Fruelda; Alan Famini
  - Electorate: 8,189 voters (2025)

Area
  - Total: 86.70 km^{2} (33.48 sq mi)
- Elevation: 24 m (79 ft)
- Highest elevation: 672 m (2,205 ft)
- Lowest elevation: 0 m (0 ft)

Population (2024 census)
  - Total: 11,254
  - Density: 129.8/km^{2} (336.2/sq mi)
  - Households: 2,686

Economy
  - Income class: 4th municipal income class
  - Poverty incidence: 31.17% (2023)
  - Revenue: ₱ 101.3 million (2024)
  - Assets: ₱ 285.4 million (2024)
  - Expenditure: ₱ 92.39 million (2024)
  - Liabilities: ₱ 40.02 million (2024)

Service provider
  - Electricity: Tablas Island Electric Cooperative (TIELCO)
- Time zone: UTC+8 (PST)
- ZIP code: 5503
- PSGC: 1705904000
- IDD : area code: +63 (0)42
- Native languages: Bantoanon; Ati; Tagalog

Calatrava, officially the Municipality of Calatrava (Bantoanon: Banwa it Calatrava, Filipino: Bayan ng Calatrava, formerly Andagao), is a municipality in the province of Romblon, Philippines. According to the 2024 census, it has a population of 11,254 people.

== History ==
=== Early history ===
Calatrava, once a barrio in the town of San Agustin (then called Badajoz) in Tablas Island. During pre-Spanish period, the place was called "Andagao", named after a medicinal plant growing in abundance everywhere in the locality especially in places along the shore.

Around 1810, the first settlers in Andagao migrated from Banton and Romblon islands, as well as in central parts of Tablas Island, in search of lands more suitable for agriculture. The Simaranhons, Sibalenhons and Bantoanons were the first settlers of the municipality and joined later by migrants from Odiongan of which, like them, spoke Asi. Today, this group of people made up the great portion of its residents, while the northern barangays of Linao, Pangulo and Talisay have significant Romblomanon residents. Onhan settlers originally from central Tablas decided to settle in the southern barangay of Balogo.

Around 1838, Andagao was organized into a fundacion (settlement) attached to visita (village) of Odiongan under the pueblo of Banton by the Spanish colonial authorities. The following year, a Spanish friar named Padre Jose Aznar from the parish of Banton visited the place and planned the construction of its first Roman Catholic church made of wood and limestone. Eleuterio Asuncion, the barrio's cabeza de barangay spearheaded its construction. After the church was completed, Andagao immediately progressed and developed. In 1850, people started using family names beginning with letter "F" as decreed by Spanish Governor-General Narciso Claveria issued on 21 November 1848.

In 1853, after the creation of the District of Romblon, 17 new towns were created which included Andagao. This was Calatrava's first proclamation as a municipality. However, when the District of Romblon was elevated into a full-pledge province a total of 15 towns were abolished, including Andagao. On 11 January 1868, Romblon became a fully pledged province and Andagao reverted to its former status as a visita and it was annexed to the town of Guintiguian (renamed Badajoz on August 28, 1868, now San Agustin).

On 14 June 1881, Andagao was renamed Calatrava during the term of the controversial military governor of Romblon, Don Jose Fernandez de Terran (1880–1883), after the Military Order of Calatrava, which was founded by the Cistercian monk St. Raymond of Fitero and tasked to defend the castle of Calatrava and other crucial towns and cities in the Andalucian region from invasions and attacks from the Moors.

=== Modern history ===
Calatrava remained part of Badajoz municipality throughout the American colonial period until 4 June 1940, when Commonwealth Act No. 581 (authored by Congressman Leonardo Festin) was passed and created the special municipality of Tablas, with its seat at Odiongan. The town of Badajoz became part of the new municipality and was represented with one special municipal councilor at the municipal council in Odiongan. Calatrava, being a barrio of Badajoz then, was not represented. On 4 June 1943, during the Second World War, the special municipality of Calatrava was created upon the sponsorship of the guerrilla movement regime under the Revolutionary Republic of the Philippines. Its first and only mayor then was Benito Famini, Sr. who served up to the liberation period. This was Calatrava's second proclamation as a municipality.

On 1 October 1946 Commonwealth Act No. 581 was repealed through the passage of Republic Act No. 38 sponsored by Congressman Modesto Formilleza. Badajoz regained back its independent municipal status and Calatrava was annexed back to Badajoz municipality as a barrio. The same year, a three-man delegation composed of Pablo Fetalino, Lauriano Falcutila, Sr. and Jose Capa from Calatrava went to Manila to lobby for a bill in Congress that will establish Calatrava as an independent municipality but it didn't push through.

On 15 June 1968, through the sponsorship Congressman Jose Moreno, Republic Act No. 5317 was drafted and approved which finally established Calatrava as an independent municipality. Thus Calatrava became Romblon's 15th independent constituency under the category of municipal-district. This was Calatrava's third proclamation as a municipality.

== Geography ==
Calatrava is situated along the northern coastal plains and rugged terrain of Tablas Island. It is bounded on the north by Tablas Strait, on the east by municipality of San Agustin, on the south and west by the municipality of San Andres. The municipality has a total land area of 8,670 hectares (21,400 acres) constituting 6.39% of Romblon's land area.

=== Barangays ===
Calatrava is politically subdivided into 7 barangays. Each barangay consists of puroks and some have sitios.

- Balogo
- Linao
- Poblacion
- Pagsangahan
- Pangulo
- San Roque
- Talisay

=== Climate ===
Climate data for Calatrava, Romblon
Month	Jan	Feb	Mar	Apr	May	Jun	Jul	Aug	Sep	Oct	Nov	Dec	Year
Mean daily maximum °C (°F)	28 (82)	29 (84)	30 (86)	31 (88)	31 (88)	30 (86)	29 (84)	29 (84)	29 (84)	29 (84)	29 (84)	28 (82)	29 (85)
Mean daily minimum °C (°F)	21 (70)	21 (70)	22 (72)	23 (73)	25 (77)	25 (77)	25 (77)	25 (77)	25 (77)	24 (75)	23 (73)	22 (72)	23 (74)
Average precipitation mm (inches)	31 (1.2)	20 (0.8)	25 (1.0)	39 (1.5)	152 (6.0)	269 (10.6)	314 (12.4)	285 (11.2)	303 (11.9)	208 (8.2)	95 (3.7)	70 (2.8)	1,811 (71.3)
Average rainy days	9.5	7.1	9.0	11.3	21.0	25.7	28.1	26.5	27.3	24.6	16.5	12.1	218.7
Source: Meteoblue (Use with caution: this is modeled/calculated data, not measured locally.)

== Demographics ==
Population census of Calatrava
Year	Pop.	±% p.a.
1970	4,754	—
1975	5,682	+3.64%
1980	6,115	+1.48%
1990	7,463	+2.01%
1995	7,734	+0.67%
2000	8,878	+3.00%
2007	9,726	+1.27%
2010	9,776	+0.19%
2015	10,275	+0.95%
2020	11,342	+2.10%
2024	11,254	−0.19%
Source: Philippine Statistics Authority

According to the 2024 census, Calatrava has a population of 11,254 people.

=== Language ===
Asi is the native language of Barangay Poblacion, Pagsangahan and San Roque, while both Asi and Ini are used in Barangay Talisay, Linao and Pangulo. Onhan is used by majority of Barangay Balogo's inhabitants, however in some of its sitios, both Asi and Ini are also being used regularly by its native residents.

== Economy ==
Poverty incidence of Calatrava (%)

Source: Philippine Statistics Authority

== Government ==
=== Local government ===
As a municipality in the Province of Romblon, government officials in the provincial level are voted by the electorates of the town. The provincial government have political jurisdiction over local transactions of the municipal government.

Pursuant to Chapter II, Title II, Book III of Republic Act 7160 or the Local Government Code of 1991, the municipal government is composed of a mayor (alkalde), a vice mayor (bise alkalde) and members (kagawad) of the legislative branch Sangguniang Bayan alongside a secretary to the said legislature, all of which are elected to a three-year term and are eligible to run for three consecutive terms. The incumbent mayor and vice mayor for the 2019–2022 term are Marieta Babera from LAKAS-CMD and Dishan Servañez y Fondevilla from PDP–Laban party, respectively.

Barangays are also headed by elected officials: Barangay Captain, Barangay Council, whose members are called Barangay Councilors. The barangays have SK federation which represents the barangay, headed by SK chairperson and whose members are called SK councilors. All officials are also elected every three years.

== Education ==
The San Agustin-Calatrava Schools District Office governs all educational institutions within the municipality. It oversees the management and operations of all private and public, from primary to secondary schools.

=== Primary and elementary schools ===
- Balogo Elementary School
- Cabibihan Elementary School
- Calatrava Elementary School
- Fetalvero-Mingoa Memorial School
- Guardian Angel Learning Center
- Josefina Fetalino Malayo Elementary School
- LDF-LCFI-Lamp Kiddie School (Balogo)
- LDF-LCFI-Lamp Kiddie School (Poblacion)
- Linao Elementary School
- Pagsangahan Elementary School
- Talisay Elementary School

=== Primary and elementary schools ===
- Calatrava National High School
- Pascual Catajay Linao National High School

== See also ==
- Mayor of Calatrava, Romblon
