= Maghali Islands =

Group of islands in the Philippines

Maghali Islands in the province of Romblon in the Philippines includes the main islands of Banton, Simara, and Sibale, also known as Maestre de Campo, as well as smaller uninhabited islands such as Bantoncillo, and the Dos Hermanas Islands, which is composed of Isabel and Carlota islands. The island group constitute the municipalities of Banton, Concepcion, and Corcuera.

In June 1940, the three municipalities of Concepcion, Corcuera, and Jones (now Banton), were merged to form the Special Municipality of Maghali. The special municipality lasted until October 1946, along with three other special municipalities, when the province of Romblon was reestablished and separated from Capiz.
