= San Andres, Romblon =

Municipality in Romblon, Philippines

San Andres Despujol
- Municipality
- Municipality of San Andres
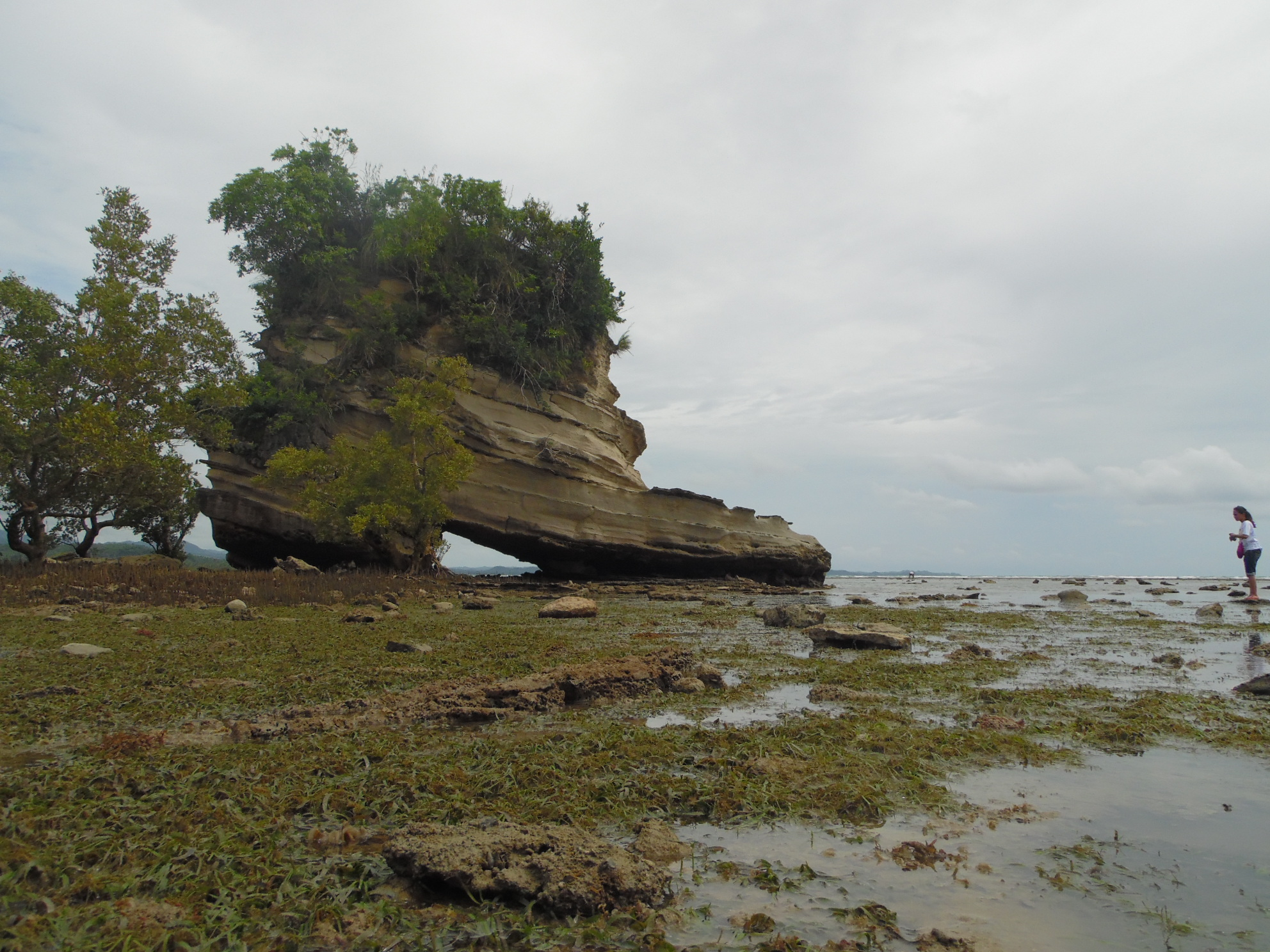
- The eponymous shoe-shaped rock formation at Sapatos Point in San Andres

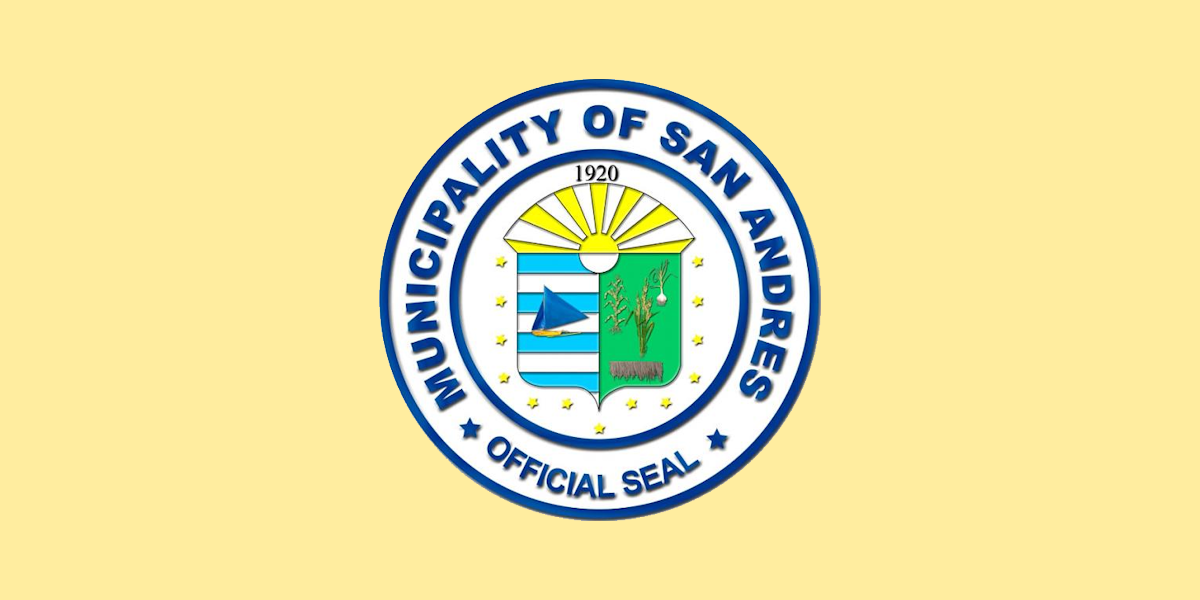
- Flag

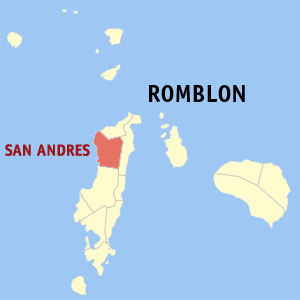
- Map of Romblon with San Andres highlighted
- Interactive map of San Andres
- Location within the Philippines
- Coordinates: 12°31′06″N 122°00′39″E
- Country: Philippines
- Region: Mimaropa
- Province: Romblon
- District: Lone district
- Named for: Saint Andrew the Apostle
- Barangays: 13 (see Barangays)

Government
  - Type: Sangguniang Bayan
  - Mayor: Fernald G. Rovillos
  - Vice Mayor: Joel G. Ibañez
  - Representative: Eleandro Jesus F. Madrona
  - Councilors: Jean Fronda; Mahal Galang; Bryan Gadon; Erwin Tangonan; Yvonne Galicia Katalbas; Miles Fabula; Flory Galus; Rodel Mores
  - Electorate: 12,090 voters (2025)

Area
  - Total: 112.00 km^{2} (43.24 sq mi)
- Elevation: 38 m (125 ft)
- Highest elevation: 672 m (2,205 ft)
- Lowest elevation: 0 m (0 ft)

Population (2024 census)
  - Total: 16,350
  - Density: 146.0/km^{2} (378.1/sq mi)
  - Households: 4,094

Economy
  - Income class: 4th municipal income class
  - Poverty incidence: 35.75% (2023)
  - Revenue: ₱ 119.8 million (2024)
  - Assets: ₱ 311.3 million (2024)
  - Expenditure: ₱ 103.8 million (2024)
  - Liabilities: ₱ 79.27 million (2024)

Service provider
  - Electricity: Tablas Island Electric Cooperative (TIELCO)
- Time zone: UTC+8 (PST)
- ZIP code: 5501
- PSGC: 1705912000
- IDD : area code: +63 (0)42
- Native languages: Bantoanon; Onhan; Tagalog

San Andres, officially the Municipality of San Andres (Inonhan: Banwa it San Andres), also known as Despujols, is a municipality in the province of Romblon, Philippines. According to the 2024 census, it has a population of 16,350 people.

== Etymology ==
On 18 June 1961, during the late years of President Carlos P. Garcia's administration, the fourth change of name for the town came through the enactment of Republic Act No. 3358. The town was renamed San Andres in honor of the town's patron, Saint Andrew, patron of fishermen, since most of the people of San Andres are fisherfolk.

== History ==
=== Early history ===
San Andres was originally a barangay of Odiongan which became a municipality on 1920. During the pre-Spanish era, it was a native settlement of nipa huts known as Parpagoja, named after a rare large bird that had its nest among the thicket along the river where settlement was located. Among the first Spaniards to reach Parpagoha during the later half of the 19th century was Don Jose de Tiran, a military commander of Romblon who set out an inspection trip of the surrounding villages. On reaching the place he ordered a civil guard to fetch a glass of water from nearby well. The water turned out to be salty and the Spaniard yelled "salado!", issuing an official order to that effect. Thus, Parpagoha came to be known as Salado.

In 1882, a prominent resident of Salado named Rufino Leaño was accused of a crime by an influential Spaniard, Don Barcelo. He succeeded in having Leaño imprisoned without trial in the provincial jail of Capiz, to which Romblon then belonged to as a sub-province. Years later, the Spanish Governor-General Eulogio Despujol (1891-1893) visited Capiz, and Leaño successfully sought an audience with him. Governor Despujol found Leaño innocent and set him free. On reaching his hometown, he successfully petitioned the provincial governor to change the name of Salado to Despujols in honor of the Governor-General.

== Geography ==
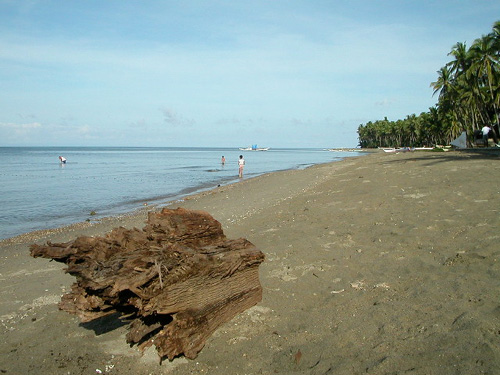
The beach at San Andres, Romblon

San Andres is a coastal town on the north-west portion of Tablas Island. It is bounded on the north by the Calatrava, on the south by Odiongan, on the east by San Agustin and on the west by the Tablas Strait. San Andres has a land area of 11,200 hectares (28,000 acres). It has mountainous and stony areas.

=== Barangays ===
San Andres is politically subdivided into 13 barangays. Each barangay consists of puroks and some have sitios.

- Agpudlos
- Calunacon
- Doña Trinidad Roxas (1953)
- Juncarlo (1983)
- Linawan
- Mabini
- Marigondon Norte
- Marigondon Sur
- Matutuna
- Pag-Alad
- Poblacion
- Tan-Agan
- Victoria

=== Climate ===
Climate data for San Andres, Romblon
Month	Jan	Feb	Mar	Apr	May	Jun	Jul	Aug	Sep	Oct	Nov	Dec	Year
Mean daily maximum °C (°F)	28 (82)	29 (84)	30 (86)	31 (88)	31 (88)	30 (86)	29 (84)	29 (84)	29 (84)	29 (84)	29 (84)	28 (82)	29 (85)
Mean daily minimum °C (°F)	21 (70)	21 (70)	22 (72)	23 (73)	25 (77)	25 (77)	25 (77)	25 (77)	25 (77)	24 (75)	23 (73)	22 (72)	23 (74)
Average precipitation mm (inches)	31 (1.2)	20 (0.8)	25 (1.0)	39 (1.5)	152 (6.0)	269 (10.6)	314 (12.4)	285 (11.2)	303 (11.9)	208 (8.2)	95 (3.7)	70 (2.8)	1,811 (71.3)
Average rainy days	9.5	7.1	9.0	11.3	21.0	25.7	28.1	26.5	27.3	24.6	16.5	12.1	218.7
Source: Meteoblue (modeled/calculated data, not measured locally)

== Demographics ==
Population census of San Andres

Year	Pop.	±% p.a.
1903	2,788	—
1939	5,634	+1.97%
1948	5,256	−0.77%
1960	6,480	+1.76%
1970	8,634	+2.91%

Year	Pop.	±% p.a.
1975	8,964	+0.76%
1980	9,529	+1.23%
1990	11,570	+1.96%
1995	13,204	+2.51%
2000	13,460	+0.41%

Year	Pop.	±% p.a.
2007	14,120	+0.66%
2010	15,028	+2.29%
2015	15,589	+0.70%
2020	15,940	+0.47%
2024	16,350	+0.61%

Source: Philippine Statistics Authority

According to the 2024 census, San Andres has a population of 16,350 people, with a density of 150 inhabitants per square kilometre or 390 inhabitants per square mile.

Majority of the population speak Onhan language, while some barangays near Odiongan and Calatrava speak the Asi language. The inhabitants are predominantly Roman Catholic, with a small number of Protestants, Jehovah's Witnesses, and Iglesia ni Cristo.

== Economy ==
Poverty incidence of San Andres (%)

Source: Philippine Statistics Authority

== Tourism ==
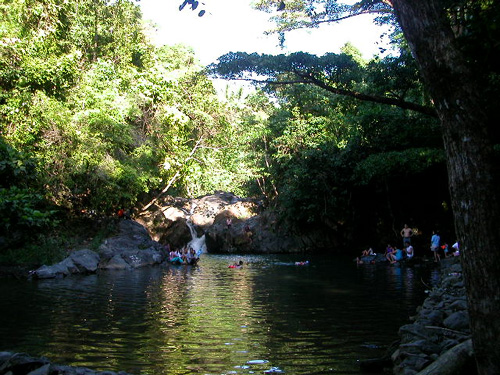
Mablaran Falls in Barangay Linawan, San Andres

Some of the tourist attractions and other places of interest in San Andres, include:

- San Andres Beach: Located at the town proper of San Andres. Fine gray sands line the three-kilometer stretch of the San Andres shoreline. During the months of June to December, the waters of San Andres beach are ideal for wind surfing.
- Mablaran Falls: Located at Barangay Linawan, San Andres, four and a half kilometers from the town proper. Mablaran falls, lies amidst lush greenery and wild foliage. The falls empties into a pool of cool, blue-green waters with a depth of about 20 feet.
- Sapatos Point: A big rock with a very peculiar shape like of a shoe or sapatos, which is located at Barangay Mabini.
- Cajil Cave: Located at Barangay Pag-alad.
- Bangko-Bangko Point: Located at Barangay Agpudlos. It is called Bangko-bangko because of the rare carving of the stones as if chairs.
- Bal-ong Falls: An enchanted falls located at Barangay Mari Sur. Cool waters runs through the big rocks at the foot of the falls and flows all the way down to the cool brook.

== Government ==
=== Local government ===
As a municipality in the Province of Romblon, government officials in the provincial level are voted by the electorates of the town. The provincial government have political jurisdiction over local transactions of the municipal government.

Pursuant to Chapter II, Title II, Book III of Republic Act 7160 or the Local Government Code of 1991, the municipal government is composed of a mayor (alkalde), a vice mayor (bise alkalde) and members (kagawad) of the legislative branch Sangguniang Bayan alongside a secretary to the said legislature, all of which are elected to a three-year term and are eligible to run for three consecutive terms.

Barangays are also headed by elected officials: Barangay Captain, Barangay Council, whose members are called Barangay Councilors. The barangays have SK federation which represents the barangay, headed by SK chairperson and whose members are called SK councilors. All officials are also elected every three years.

=== Elected officials ===
Incumbent mayor and vice mayor of San Andres for the 2025-2028 term are Dok Fernald G. Rovillos (PFP) and Joel Ibañez of Nacionalista Party, respectively.

Term	Mayor	Vice Mayor
30 June 2010 - 30 June 2013	Geminiano G. Galicia, Jr. (NP)	Arsenio G. Gadon (NPC)
30 June 2013 – 30 June 2016	Fernald G. Rovillos (UNA) (NPC)	Rene Mingoa (NP)
30 June 2016 - 30 June 2019	Fernald G. Rovillos (UNA) (NPC)	Arsenio Gadon (LP)
30 June 2019 - 30 June 2022	Arsenio "Lolong" Gadon (LAKAS); NP	Joel Ibañez (NP); NP (NPC)
30 June 2022 - 30 June 2025	Arsenio "Lolong" Gadon (LAKAS); NP	Joel Ibañez (NP); NP (NPC)
30 June 2025 - incumbent	Fernald G. Rovillos (PFP)	Joel Ibañez (NP); NP (NPC)

^{a} Died in office.
^{b} Served in acting capacity.
^{c} Resigned.

== Education ==
The San Andres Schools District Office governs all educational institutions within the municipality. It oversees the management and operations of all private and public, from primary to secondary schools.

=== Primary and elementary schools ===
- Agpudlos Elementary School
- Ben G. Talamisan Memorial School (Pag-alad Elementary School)
- Calunacon Elementary School
- Doña Martina F. Ganan Memorial School
- Florentino Children's Learning Center
- Geminiano Galicia Sr. Memorial School
- Linawan Elementary School
- Marigondon Norte Elementary School
- Marigondon Sur Elementary School
- Matutuna Elementary School
- Nemesio N. Ganan III Memorial School
- San Andres Central Elementary School
- Tan-Agan Elementary School
- Victoria Elementary School

=== Secondary schools ===
- Fabella Institute
- San Andres Cultural High School
- San Andres National High School
- Tanagan National High School
