= Bantoanon language =

Bisayan language spoken in the province of Romblon, Philippines

Bantoanon
- Asi
- Binantoanon
- Native to: Philippines
- Region: Romblon
- Native speakers: 75,000 (2011)
- Language family: Austronesian: Malayo-Polynesian; Philippine; Central Philippine; Bisayan; Bantoanon
- Dialects: Bantoanon; Odionganon; Calatravanhon; Sibalenhon; Simaranhon
- Writing system: Latin (Bantoanon Alphabet); Baybayin locally known as Suyat (historical)

Language codes
- ISO 639-3: bno
- Glottolog: bant1288
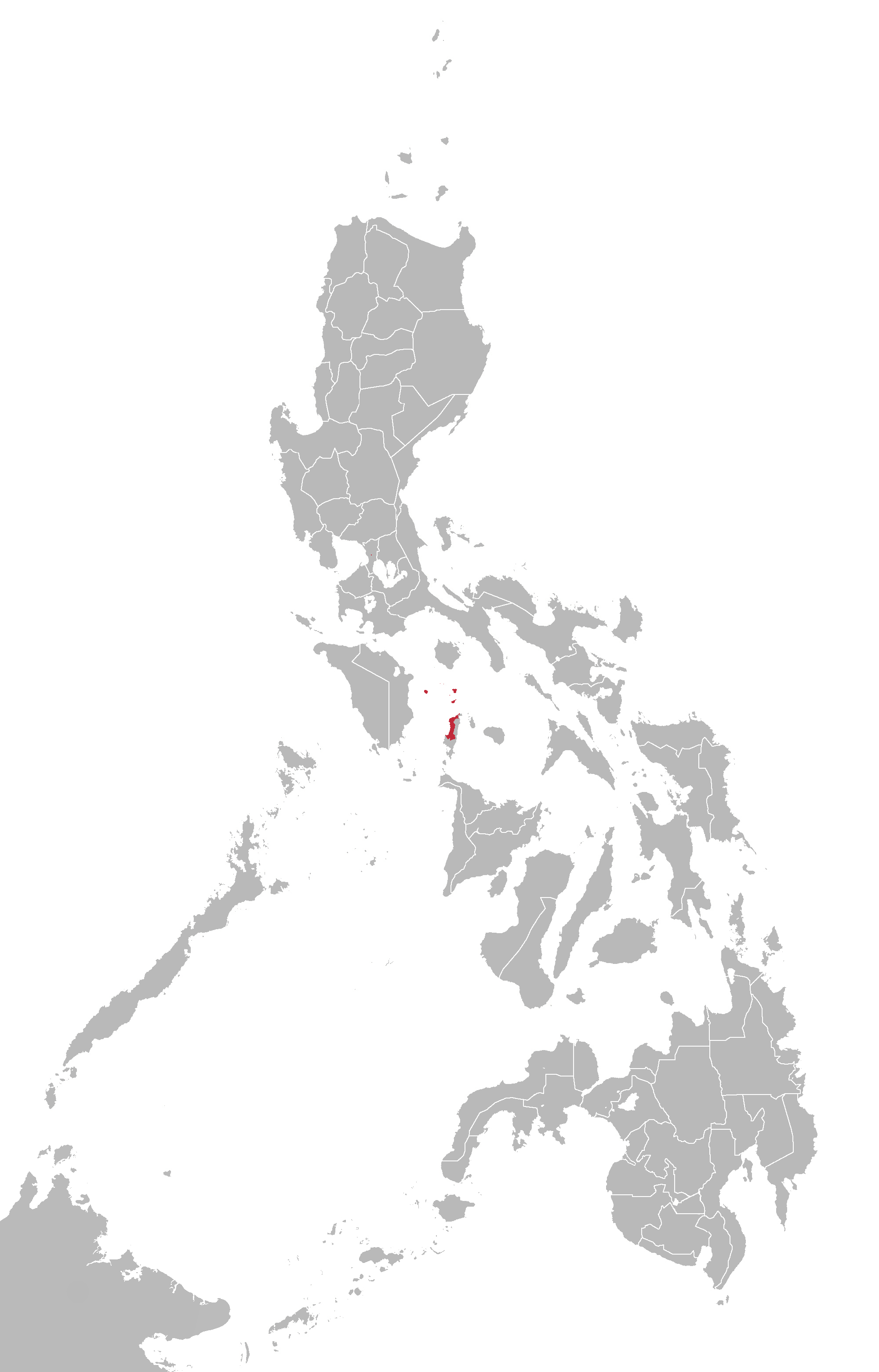
- Bantoanon language map

Bantoanon or Asi is a regional Bisayan language spoken, along with Romblomanon and Onhan, in the province of Romblon, Philippines. Asi originated in the island of Banton, Romblon and spread to the neighboring islands of Sibale, Simara, and the towns of Odiongan, San Andres and Calatrava on Tablas Island. The Asi spoken in Odiongan is called Odionganon, Calatravanhon in Calatrava, Sibalenhon in Concepcion, Simaranhon in Corcuera, and Bantoanon in Banton. The Asi language is closer to Western Visayan languages like Karay-a than to Cebuano and Waray.

Specifically, it is spoken on the following islands within Romblon:

- Tablas: the municipalities of Odiongan, San Andres and Calatrava, situated respectively on the western and northern parts of the island. The Odiongan dialect has more outside influences and is more widely used in literature.
- Banton, encompassing the whole municipality of Banton
- Simara, encompassing the whole municipality of Corcuera
- Maestre de Campo, also known as Sibale, encompassing the whole municipality of Concepcion

Linguist David Zorc notes that Bantoanon speakers may have been the first Bisayan speakers in the Romblon region. He also suggests that Asi may have a Western Visayan substratum and that many of its words may have been influenced by the later influx of other languages such as Romblomanon.

== Nomenclature ==
While Bantoanon is the original and most common name of the language, the name Asi, meaning 'why', is also commonly used especially in formal and academic papers. The Commission on the Filipino Language or KWF prescribes the use of Ási with the acute accent on the Á, although the native pronunciation is closer to Asì with only a grave accent on the ì. Considering that the language has four other dialects other than Bantoanon: Odionganon, Calatravanhon, Sibalenhon, and Simaranhon, Asi is occasionally used instead of Bantoanon to distinguish between the language and the dialect of it spoken in Banton. Speakers of dialects that have evolved through the Bantoanon diaspora prefer Asi, or just their dialect's name. In casual speech, however, native speakers often refer to the language as Bisaya, not to be confused with other Bisayan languages.

== Sounds ==
Bantoanon has sixteen consonant phonemes: /p, t, k, ʔ, b, d, ɡ, s, h, m, n, ŋ, l, ɾ~r, w, j/. There are three vowel phonemes: /i, a, u/. The three vowels each have allophones of [ɪ, e, ɛ, ə], [ʌ], [o]. /i/ is always used as [i] when it is in the beginning and middle syllables, [e, ɛ] is always used when it is in final syllables, [ɪ] when in open-prestressed syllables, and as [ə] in word-final post-stressed syllables before /ɾ~r/. [ʌ] is heard as an allophone of /a/ when in closed syllables. The vowel [o] is an allophone of /u/, and is always heard when it is in final syllables. This is one of the Philippine languages that do not exhibit [ɾ]-[d] allophony.

== Grammar ==
=== Pronouns ===
			Absolutive	Ergative	Oblique
1st person	singular		akó	nako, ko	akò
1st person	plural	exclusive	kami	namo	amo
1st person	plural	inclusive	kita	nato	ato
2nd person	singular		ikaw, ka	nimo, mo	imo
2nd person	plural		kamo	ninro	inro
3rd person	singular		sida	nida	ida
3rd person	plural		sinra	ninra	inra

=== Cardinal Numbers ===
One-digit
English	Tagalog	Bantoanon	Spanish-derived
one	isa	usá	uno, una
two	dalawa	ruhá	dos
three	tatlo	tatló	tres
four	apat	ap-át	kuwatro
five	lima	limá	singko
six	anim	án-om	sais
seven	pito	pitó	siyete
eight	walo	wayó	otso
nine	siyam	sidám	nuwebe

Bantoanon speakers prefer using Spanish-derived or English numbers for financial situations.

Two-digit
English	Tagalog	Bantoanon	Spanish-derived
ten	sampu	sampúyò	diyes
eleven	labing-isa	sampúyò ag usá	onse
twelve	labindalawa	sampúyò ag ruhá	dose
thirteen	labintatlo	sampúyò ag tatló	trese
fourteen	labing-apat	sampúyò ag ap-át	katorse
fifteen	labinlima	sampúyò ag limá	kinse
sixteen	labing-anim	sampúyò ag án-om	disisais
seventeen	labimpito	sampúyò ag pitó	disisiyete
eighteen	labingwalo	sampúyò ag wayó	disiotso
nineteen	labinsiyam	sampúyò ag sidám	disinuwebe
twenty	dalawampu	ruhámpúyò	baynte
twenty-one	dalawampu't isa	ruhámpúyò ag usá	baynte uno
twenty-two	dalawampu't dalawa	ruhámpúyò ag ruhá	baynte dos
twenty-three	dalawampu't tatlo	ruhámpúyò ag tatló	baynte tres
thirty	tatlumpu	tatlómpúyò	treynta
forty	apatnapu	ap-át nak púyò,ap-átampúyò	kuwarenta
fifty	limampu	limámpúyò	singkuwenta
sixty	animnapu	án-om nak púyò,an-omnapúyò	sesenta
seventy	pitumpu	pitómpúyò	sesenta
eighty	walumpu	wayómpúyò	otsenta
ninety	siyamnapu	sidámnapúyò	nobenta

For numbers 11 to 90, Bantoanon speakers rarely use Bantoanon numbers, but instead their Spanish-derived counterparts even in contexts not related to finances.

Three-digit
English	Tagalog	Bantoanon	Spanish-derived
one-hundred	isang daan	usáng gatós	(un) siyento
two-hundred	dalawang daan	ruháng gatós	dos siyentos
three-hundred	tatlong daan	tatlóng gatós	tres siyentos
four-hundred	apat na raan	ap-át nak gatós	kuwatro siyentos
five-hundred	limang daan	limáng gatós	kinyentos
six-hundred	anim na raan	án-om nak gatós	sais siyentos
seven-hundred	pitong daan	pitóng gatós	siyete siyentos
eight-hundred	walong daan	wayóng gatós	otso siyentos
nine-hundred	siyam na raan	sidám nak gatós	nuwebe siyentos
one-hundred-twenty-three	isang daan at dalawampu't tatlo	usáng gatós ag ruhampúyò ag tatlo	siyento baynte'y tres

Four-digit and above
Number	Tagalog	Bantoanon	Spanish-derived
1,000	isang libo	usáng líbo	(un) mil
2,000	dalawang libo	ruháng líbo	dos mil
10,000	sampung libo	sampúyòng líbo	diyes mil
100,000	isang daang libo	usáng gatós nak líbo	siyen mil
1,000,000	isang milyon	usáng milyón	(un) milyon
1,234,567	isang milyon dalawang daan at tatlumpu't apat na libo limang daan at animnapu't pito	usáng milyón ruhámpúyòng gatós ag tatlómpúyòng ap-át nak líbo limáng gatós ag an-óm nak púyò ag pitó	(un) milyon dos siyentos treynta'y kuwatro mil kinyentos sesenta'y siyete

=== Ordinal Numbers ===
English	Tagalog	Bantoanon	Spanish-derived
first	una	primero	primero
second	pangalawa, ikalawa	pangaruhá, ikaruhá	segundo
third	pangatlo, ikatlo	pangatló, ikatatlo	tersero
fourth	pang-apat, ika-apat	pang ap-át, ikaap-át	kuwarto
fifth	panlima, ikalima	panlima, ika-limá	kinto
sixth	pang-anim, ikaanim	pang-an-óm, ika-an-óm	seksto
seventh	pampito, ikapito	pampito, ikapitó	septimo
eighth	pangwalo, ikawalo	pangwayó, ikawayó	oktabo
ninth	pangsiyam, ikasiyam	pangsidám, ikasidám	nobeno
tenth	pangsampu, ikasampu	pangsampúyò	desimo

==== Legend ====
In Italics = rarely used and/or reconstructed based on existing vocabulary and grammar.

== Examples ==
Basic Phrases
English	Tagalog	Bantoanon	Kinaray-a
Yes	Oo	Óhò	Huód
No	Hindi	Indî - used to refuse or reject. Bukô - used when negating something.	Indi and Bëkën
Hello / How are you?	Kumusta ka?	Kumusta ka?	Kumusta kaw?
I'm fine, how about you?	Mabuti naman, ikaw?	Maado ra, ikaw?	Mayad man, ikaw?
What's your name?	Anong pangalan mo?	Nio ka imo ngayan?	Ano imo ngaran?
My name is... / I am...	Ako si...	Ako si...	Ako si...
How old are you?	Ilang taon ka na?	Piláng túigey ka?	Pira kaw ka tuig?
I am 24 years old.	Bente-kuwatro anyos na ako.	Báynte-kuwátro ányosey akó.	Baynte-kwatro anyos rën ako.
Please	Pakiusap	Palihog	Palihog
Thank you	Salamat	Salamat	Salamat
Thank you very much	Maraming Salamat	Maramong Salamat, Salamat nak gador	Rakë nga salamat.
I don't know	Hindi ko alam. Ewan.	Bukô náko ayám. Ilam.	Wara ako kamáan.
Help!	Tulong!	Tábang!	Tabang!
Help me!	Tulungan n'yo 'ko!	Tabángi akó!	Buligi ako!, Tabangi ako!
Where is the restroom?	Nasaan po ang CR?	Hariin kag CR?	Diin ang kasilyas?
How much is this?	Magkano po ito?	Tigpíla kalí?	Tagpira dya?
What time is it?	Anong oras na?	Nióng órasey?	Ano oras rën?
Just a minute!	Sandali lang!	Ánay yang!	Danay lang/lamang!
