= Concepcion, Romblon =

Municipality in Romblon, Philippines

Concepcion Silabe Municipality Sibale, Sibale Island
- Municipality
- Municipality of Concepcion
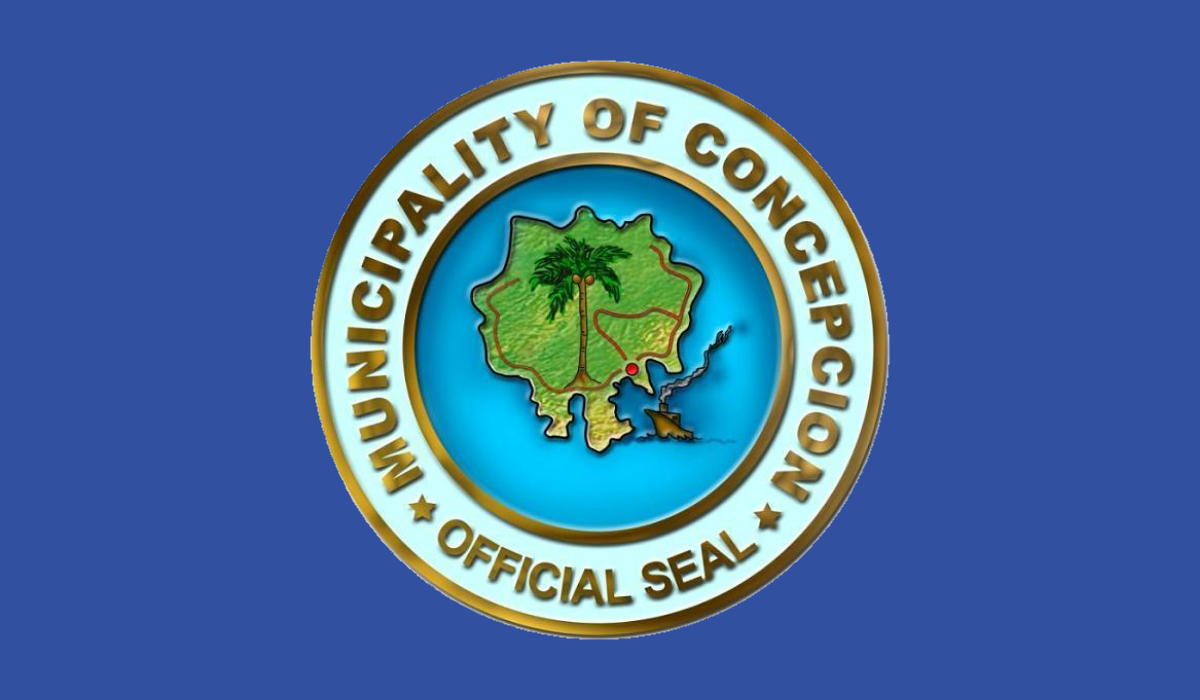
- Flag

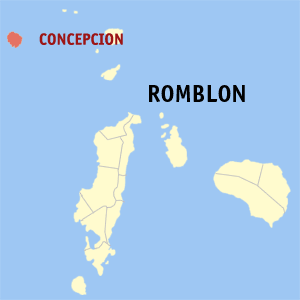
- Map of Romblon with Concepcion highlighted
- Interactive map of Concepcion
- Location within the Philippines
- Coordinates: 12°55′25″N 121°42′35″E
- Country: Philippines
- Region: Mimaropa
- Province: Romblon
- District: Lone district
- Founded: 1570
- Barangays: List: 9 (see Barangays)

Government
  - Type: Sangguniang Bayan
  - Mayor: Hon. Nicon F. Fameronag
  - Vice Mayor: Hon. Limwel F. Cipriano
  - Representative: Hon. Eleandro Jesus F. Madrona
  - Councilors: Paul F. Faigmani; Jasmin F. Familaran; Terry F. Fabreag; Reinhart F. Famarin; Tirso A. Pastrana; Lenneth L. Fabroa; Angelita F. Fabellore; Geralyn F. Mendoza; Renz F. Famisan, SK President; Medrito F. Fabreag, Jr., Liga President

Area
  - Total: 19.82 km^{2} (7.65 sq mi)
- Elevation: 26 m (85 ft)
- Highest elevation: 104 m (342 ft)
- Lowest elevation: 0 m (0 ft)

Population (2024 census)
  - Total: 3,427
  - Rank: Last Place
  - Density: 20/km^{2} (52/sq mi)
  - Households: 1,054
- Demonym: Concepcioneño

Economy
  - Income class: 5th municipal income class
  - Poverty incidence: 26.97% (2023)
  - Revenue: ₱ 65.52 million (2024)
  - Assets: ₱ 256.3 million (2024)
  - Expenditure: ₱ 50.94 million (2024)
  - Liabilities: ₱ 20.27 million (2024)

Service provider
  - Electricity: Romblon Electric Cooperative (ROMELCO)
- Time zone: UTC+8 (PST)
- ZIP code: 5516
- PSGC: 1705905000
- IDD : area code: +63 (0)42
- Native languages: Bantoanon; Tagalog

Concepcion, officially the Municipality of Concepcion (Bantoanon: Banwa it Concepcion, Filipino: Bayan ng Concepcion), is a municipality in the province of Romblon, Philippines. According to the 2024 census, it has a population of 3,427 people.

The town is coextensive with Maestre de Campo Island, which is also known as Sibale Island.

== History ==
=== Early history ===
Concepcion started as a small village founded in 1570 by the Spanish colonization forces led by Martin de Goiti and Juan de Salcedo, upon orders from the then Spanish Governor-General of the Philippines, Miguel Lopez de Legazpi. The village was named after the Immaculate Concepcion. Throughout the Spanish era, the village was administered as part of Banton municipality on nearby Banton Island.

On July 2, 1907, during the American colonization of the Philippines, Concepcion was elevated to municipal status but was incorporated as part of Mindoro province after Romblon was abolished and incorporated as part of Capiz province. However, on March 10, 1917, Romblon was reinstated as a separate province, and thus, Concepcion was incorporated back into the province.

On June 8, 1940, the special municipality of Maghali was established upon passage of Commonwealth Act No. 581 (authored by Congressman Leonardo Festin). This demoted Concepcion and Corcuera from their municipality status and incorporated them into the new municipality with its capital in Banton. The special municipality was abolished through the passage of Republic Act No. 38 (authored by Congressman Modesto Formilleza), and by October 1, 1946, Concepcion regained its municipal status which it still holds today.

=== Proposed secession ===
Among the islands of Romblon, Concepcion is the farthest from the provincial capital. It is also far from the nearest commercial capital, Odiongan. It takes five hours to travel between Concepcion and Romblon thus making it difficult for provincial executives to visit the island municipality. The nearest municipality from Concepcion is Pinamalayan, Oriental Mindoro, which is only two hours by boat. Hence, most Sibalenhons buy and sell their products in this town instead of Odiongan or Romblon.

In the past, there have been attempts to secede Concepcion from Romblon and re-annex it to Oriental Mindoro. On March 16, 1924, Act No. 3131 was introduced in Congress seeking to re-annex the municipality to Oriental Mindoro but it didn't push through. More recently, in 2014, town mayor Lemuel Cipriano expressed that "90% of Concepcion's 4,500 population are seeking to be re-annexed to Oriental Mindoro". In order to be re-annexed, a resolution calling for a referendum in the island must be filed in Congress by the provincial representative. Oriental Mindoro governor Alfonso Umali Jr. and Second District Congressman Reynaldo Umali have expressed support for a possible referendum.

== Geography ==
Concepcion comprises the whole of Maestre de Campo Island, also known as Sibale to its inhabitants, which is the westernmost island of the province and approximately 20 kilometres (12 mi) off the eastern coast of Mindoro. The island is mountainous with steep shores. Its settlements are dispersed along the coast with the poblacion on the south shore. The island's interior is jagged and forested, with caves, clear rivers, unique rock formations, and hills that offer extensive views. Every village has its own cove and white sand beaches which are used for swimming and scuba diving.

=== Barangays ===
Concepcion is politically subdivided into 9 barangays. Each barangay consists of puroks and some have sitios.

- Bachawan
- Calabasahan
- Dalajican
- Masudsud
- Poblacion
- Sampong
- San Pedro (Agbatang)
- San Vicente
- Masadya

=== Climate ===
Climate data for Concepcion, Romblon
Month	Jan	Feb	Mar	Apr	May	Jun	Jul	Aug	Sep	Oct	Nov	Dec	Year
Mean daily maximum °C (°F)	26 (79)	28 (82)	29 (84)	31 (88)	31 (88)	30 (86)	29 (84)	29 (84)	29 (84)	29 (84)	28 (82)	27 (81)	29 (84)
Mean daily minimum °C (°F)	22 (72)	22 (72)	22 (72)	23 (73)	25 (77)	25 (77)	25 (77)	25 (77)	25 (77)	24 (75)	23 (73)	23 (73)	24 (75)
Average precipitation mm (inches)	115 (4.5)	66 (2.6)	55 (2.2)	39 (1.5)	164 (6.5)	282 (11.1)	326 (12.8)	317 (12.5)	318 (12.5)	192 (7.6)	119 (4.7)	173 (6.8)	2,166 (85.3)
Average rainy days	13.6	9.4	10.4	10.5	21.1	26.0	29.0	27.6	27.5	23.1	16.7	16.1	231
Source: Meteoblue (modeled/calculated data, not measured locally)

== Demographics ==
Population census of Concepcion
Year	Pop.	±% p.a.
1918	1,227	—
1939	1,754	+1.72%
1948	2,187	+2.48%
1960	2,998	+2.66%
1970	4,830	+4.88%
1975	4,997	+0.68%
1980	5,090	+0.37%
1990	4,910	−0.36%
1995	5,126	+0.81%
2000	4,683	−1.92%
2007	4,166	−1.60%
2010	4,445	+2.39%
2015	4,037	−1.82%
2020	3,561	−2.61%
2024	3,427	−0.92%
Source: Philippine Statistics Authority

According to the 2024 census, it has a population of 3,427 people.

=== Language ===
The majority of its inhabitants speak the local dialect, Asi, which is also spoken on the nearby islands of Banton and Simara. Sibalenhons, as the islanders call themselves, are predominantly Roman Catholic with a small percentage of Protestants, Jehovah's Witnesses, and Iglesia ni Cristo.

== Economy ==
Poverty incidence of Concepcion (%)

Source: Philippine Statistics Authority

== Government ==
=== Local government ===
As a municipality in the Province of Romblon, government officials in the provincial level are voted by the electorates of the town. The provincial government has political jurisdiction over local transactions of the municipal government.

Pursuant to Chapter II, Title II, Book III of Republic Act 7160 or the Local Government Code of 1991, the municipal government is composed of a mayor (Alkalde), a vice mayor (Bise Alkalde) and members (konsehal) of the legislative branch Sangguniang Bayan alongside a secretary to the said legislature, all of which are elected to a three-year term and are eligible to run for three consecutive terms. As of June 30, 2019, Concepcion's incumbent mayor is Medrito "Jun" Fabreag, Jr. while his vice mayor is Monico "Nonoy" Firmalan, Jr. Both are from the PDP–Laban political party.

The barangays or villages, meanwhile, are headed by elected officials, the topmost being the Punong Barangay or the Barangay Chairperson (addressed as Kapitan; also known as the Barangay Captain). The Kapitan is aided by the Sangguniang Barangay (Barangay Council) whose members, called Barangay Kagawad (Councilors), are also elected. The barangays have SK federation which represents the barangay, headed by a chairperson and whose members are called SK councilors. All officials are also elected every three years.

Term	Mayor	Vice Mayor
30 June 2013 - 30 June 2016	Limuel 'Boyet' Cipriano	Medrito "Jun" Fabreag, Jr.
30 June 2016 - 30 June 2019	Medrito "Jun" Fabreag, Jr.	Monico Firmalan, Jr.
30 June 2019 - 30 June 2022	Medrito "Jun" Fabreag, Jr.	Monico Firmalan, Jr.
30 June 2022 - 30 June 2025	Nicon F. Fameronag (IND) (PFP)	Limuel 'Boyet' Cipriano (IND) (PFP)
30 June 2025 - incumbent	Nicon F. Fameronag (IND) (PFP)	Limuel 'Boyet' Cipriano (IND) (PFP)

^{a} Died in office.
^{b} Served in acting capacity.
^{c} Resigned.

== Tourism ==
The mountains and the forest offer mountain trekkers new challenges. The beaches have diving spots. Tropical coral reef systems surround the island. Some old folk believe they share the forest and coves with enchanted beings.

Each of the island's nine barangays has its own cove with a palm-fringed white sand beach front. The entire island is visited for its swimming and scuba diving. Notable beaches include those along Tongo Point and the beaches between barangay (village) Bachawan and Sampong. The island's interior hills, stretching five to nine kilometers, have trails for hiking and climbing. The island hills are also commonly visited by motocross biking enthusiasts. Other places of interest on the island include:

- Mount Banderahan: American soldiers in the early 20th century climbed the island's mountain and planted an American flag. The flagpole, hewed in a big stone, is a landmark sought out by mountain climbers.
- Tinigban Falls: The fall site is a rock formation amid lush greenery. An old Spanish encomendero once built a mansion here, embedding a mirror into a huge rock so he could have a full view of the waterfalls from his bathroom.
- Matudtod Cave: Ancient skeletal remains and artifacts were found in this cave.
- Quebrada Beach: Quebrada beach facing the town of Concepcion, scalloping the cove with its white sand and wonderful rock formation.

== Education ==
The Concepcion Schools District Office governs all educational institutions within the municipality. It oversees the management and operations of all private and public, from primary to secondary schools.

=== Primary and elementary schools ===
- Agbatang Primary School
- Bakhawan Elementary School
- Calabasahan Elementary School
- Concepcion Central Elementary School (CCES)
- Dalajican Elementary School
- Masadya Primary School
- Masudsud Elementary School
- Sampong Elementary School
- San Vicente Elementary School

=== Secondary schools ===
- Concepcion National High School (Poblacion)
- Concepcion National High School Annex (Bakhawan)
- Sibale Academy of the Immaculate Concepcion (SAIC)
