= List of Cultural Properties of the Philippines in Mimaropa =

This list contains an overview of the government recognized Cultural Properties of the Philippines in Mimaropa. The list is based on the official lists provided by the National Commission on Culture and the Arts, National Historical Commission of the Philippines and the National Museum of the Philippines.

Cultural Property wmph identifier (Note: wmph is an internal identifier used by Wikimedia Philippines to identify the monument. This is not an official identifier, and only shown temporarily in the templates until the government creates an updated complete list.)	Site name	Description	Province	City or municipality	Address	Coordinates	Image
PH-41-0001	Boac Cathedral		Marinduque	Boac		13°26′58″N 121°50′30″E	Upload file
PH-41-0002	Casa Narvas		Marinduque	Boac			Upload Photo
PH-41-0004	Kapitan Piroko House		Marinduque	Boac			Upload Photo
PH-41-0005	Freedom Park		Marinduque	Boac			Upload Photo
PH-41-0006	Boac Museum and Library		Marinduque	Boac			Upload file
PH-41-0007	Balanacan Station		Marinduque	Mogpog			Upload file
PH-41-0009	Calapan Church		Oriental Mindoro	Calapan	Bonifacio Drive	13°24′53″N 121°10′49″E	Upload file
PH-41-0010	Cape Melville Lighthouse		Palawan	Cape Melville, Balabac		7°49′00″N 117°00′08″E	Upload file
PH-41-0011	Fort Culion		Palawan	Culion		11°53′32″N 120°01′27″E	Upload file
PH-41-0012	Fort Cuyo		Palawan	Cuyo		10°51′20″N 121°00′29″E	Upload file
PH-41-0013	Iwahig Penal Colony		Palawan	Puerto Princesa	Iwahig	9°44′43″N 118°40′01″E	Upload file
PH-41-0014	Plaza Cuartel		Palawan	Puerto Princesa	Taft Street	9°44′24″N 118°43′47″E	Upload file
PH-41-0015	Fort Santa Isabel		Palawan	Taytay			More images
PH-41-0016	Twin Forts of Romblon		Romblon	Romblon		12°34′45″N 122°16′14″E	More images
PH-41-0017	Romblon Cathedral	The church, dedicated to Saint Joseph, was elevated as the Romblon Cathedral in 1974 with the creation of the Diocese of Romblon.	Romblon	Romblon	Rizal Street	12°34′33″N 122°16′10″E	More images
PH-41-0018	Kuta Church Ruins	Built in the 17th century by Augustinian Recollects. Declared National Historical Landmark on May 8, 2013.	Oriental Mindoro	Bongabong	Sitio Cuta, Barangay Anilao		Upload file

== See also ==
- List of historical markers of the Philippines in Mimaropa
- List of Cultural Properties of the Philippines in Pinamalayan, Oriental Mindoro
