= List of historical markers of the Philippines in Mimaropa =

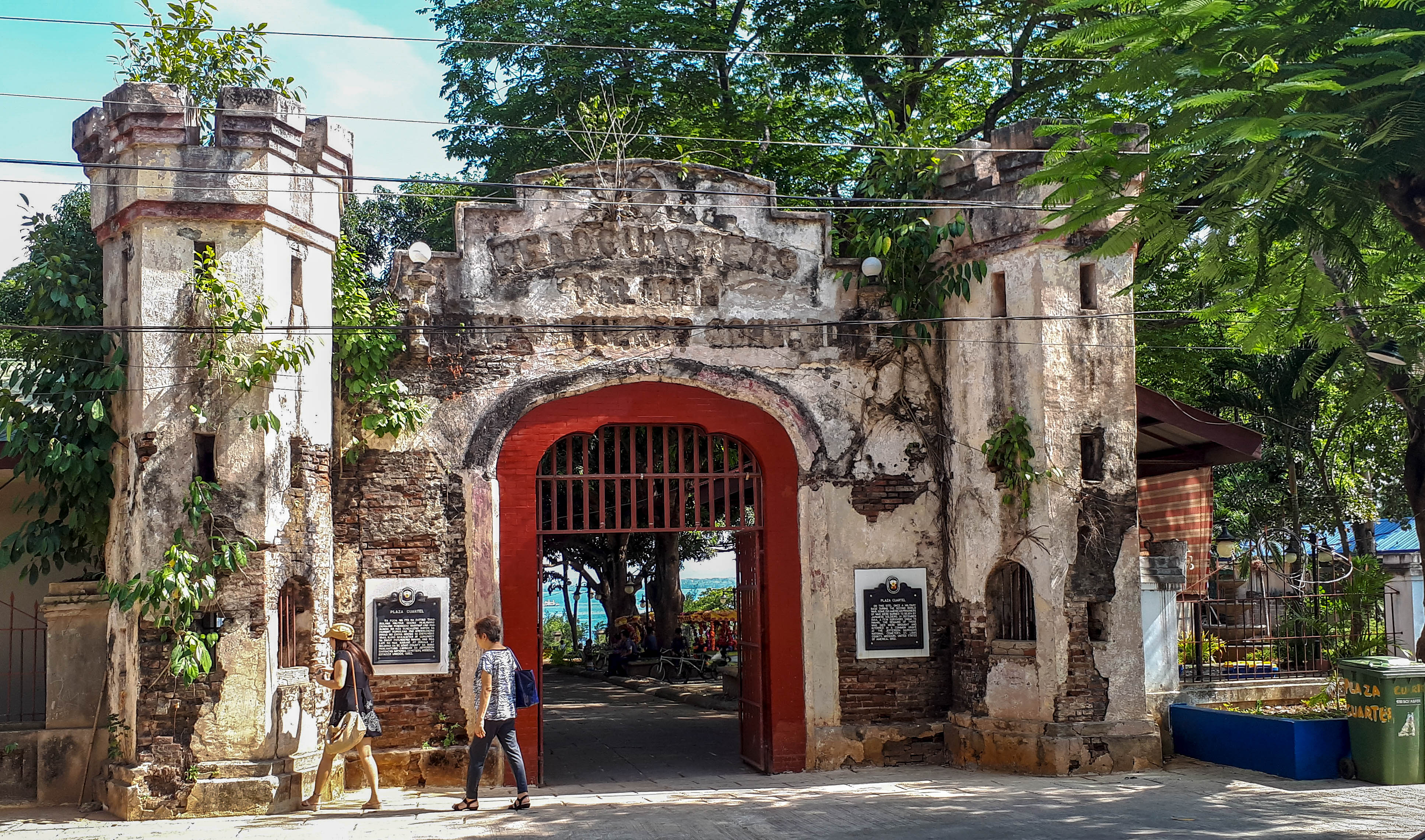
Gate of Plaza Cuartel, Puerto Princesa City with markers in both Filipino and English

This list of historical markers installed by the National Historical Commission of the Philippines (NHCP) in Mimaropa (Region IV-B) is an annotated list of people, places, or events in the region that have been commemorated by cast-iron plaques issued by the said commission. The plaques themselves are permanent signs installed in publicly visible locations on buildings, monuments, or in special locations.

While many Cultural Properties have historical markers installed, not all places marked with historical markers are designated into one of the particular categories of Cultural Properties.

Related to the discovered shipwrecks (Japanese ship Musashi) in Sibuyan Island, Romblon, a group has been pushing the transfer of the marker Labanan sa Karagatan ng Sibuyan (Battle of Sibuyan Sea) to the said island from the town of Alcantara.

This article lists 41 markers from the MIMAROPA Region, including four that are part of the Quincentennial historical markers series.

== Marinduque ==
This table lists 15 markers from the province of Marinduque.

Marker title	Description	Location	Language	Date issued	Image
Casa Narvas (Note: Narvas House)	Declared as a heritage house by the NHCP.	Boac (replaced by a 2025 marker)	English	2007	
Casa Narvas (Note: Narvas House)	Declared as a heritage house by the NHCP.	Boac	English	2025	
Labanan sa Paye (Note: Battle of Paye)	Site of the second battle of Marinduque in the Filipino-American War.	Boac	Filipino	July 31, 1986; July 31, 2000	
Ang Labanan sa Pulang Lupa (Note: Battle of Pulang Lupa)	Monument to a successful battle of the Filipinos against the Americans in the Philippine–American War.	Torrijos	Filipino	September 12, 1971; September 13, 2000	
Liwasan ng Kalayaan (Note: Freedom Park)	Where the document was signed which ended the Filipino-American war in Marinduque.	Boac	Filipino	December 6, 1975	
Maharlikang Tahanan ni Kapitan Piroko (Note: Noble House of Captain Piroco)	Where locals requested that Marinduque be made a separate province. Ricardo Paras, Sr. became first governor.	Boac	Filipino	February 23, 1973	
Tanda ng Ika-sandaang Taong Pagkakatatag (Note: Marker of the Hundredth Year of Foundation)	Former Boac High School, now Marinduque National High School; became a garrison for the Japanese, but burned down by guerilla movements.	Boac	Filipino	September 24, 2014	
Marinduque Revolutionary Force	Organized by Gov. Martin Lardizabal pursuant to the order of Gen. Mariano Trias after the outbreak of the Filipino-American War.	Torrijos	English	September 13, 2000	
Museo at Aklatan ng Boac (Note: Museum and Library of Boac)	Site of the oldest Catholic school in Marinduque. Rebuilt in 1987 as museum and library.	Boac	Filipino	November 30, 1987	
Pilar Hidalgo Lim	First woman to finish with distinction from the University of the Philippines in 1913 One of the leaders of the woman suffrage.	Boac	Filipino	May 24, 1982	
Puwerto ng Laylay, Boac (Note: Port of Laylay, Boac)	Main port of Marinduque, used as port for ships departing for Manila and other provinces.	Boac	Filipino	June 4, 2015	
Ricardo M. Paras, Jr.	Chief Justice of the Supreme Court. Known for his writings regarding Philippine jurisprudence.	Hall of Justice, Provincial Capitol Compound, Boac	Filipino	May 30, 2005	
Salvador del Mundo	Leading Filipino chemist. Chief chemist of the Ceramics Laboratory of the Bureau of Science.	Boac	Filipino	May 24, 1982	
Simbahan ng Boac (Note: Boac Church)	Built in 1792. Parish priest named Saturnino Trinidad helped Colonel Maximo Abad surrender to the Americans under H.H. Bandholtz.	Boac	Filipino	May 7, 1972	
Station Balanacan; Datum Origin of the Luzon Datum of 1911	Primary geodetic station for the triangulation network of the Philippines; the geographical center of the Philippines	Mogpog	Filipino	August 9, 2011	

== Occidental Mindoro ==
This table lists two markers from the province of Occidental Mindoro.

Marker title	Description	Location	Language	Date issued	Image
Lumang Simbahan ng Sablayan (Note: Old Church of Sablayan)	Established as a Recollect parish in 1843. Damaged by a tsunami in 1877. Restored from 1877-1879.	Old Sablayan Church, Sablayan	Filipino	July 12, 2018	
Pagdaong sa Mindoro (Note: Mindoro Landing)	Commemorates the landing of the Visayan Attack Force on December 15, 1944 as well as the Filipino guerillas in Mindoro.	San Jose	Filipino	2010	

== Oriental Mindoro ==
This table lists four markers from the province of Oriental Mindoro.

Marker title	Description	Location	Language	Date issued	Image
Church of Calapan		Calapan	English	1937	
Church of Calapan	Fortified with stone wall, to watchtowers, and twenty-two cannons.	Calapan	English	1952	
Mga Guho ng Simbahang Kuta (Note: Ruins of the Church–Fort)	Served as an evacuation center during invasions. Destroyed during the Muslim invasions of 1753-1754 because of their opposition to Spanish rule.	So. Kuta, Brgy. Anilao, Bongabong	Filipino	May 8, 2013	
Isinilang sa Pook na Ito, 10 ng Marso 1869; Macario Adriatico (Note: Born here 10 March 1869 Macario Adriatico)	Lawyer and writer. First representative of Mindoro in the Asemblea Filipina.	Calapan	Filipino, Spanish	1949	

== Palawan ==
This table lists 16 markers from the province of Palawan.

Marker title	Description	Location	Language	Date issued	Image
Balabac; Ruta ng Ekspedisyong Magallanes–Elcano sa Pilipinas (Note: Balabac: Route of the Magellan–Elcano expedition in the Philippines)	This island served as a guide for the expedition towards Brunei.	Brgy. Poblacion V, Balabac	Filipino	October 11, 2021	
Church of St. John the Baptist	Church fortress finished construction in 1748. Built by the Augustinian Recollects.	Agutaya	English	1999	
Culion Leper Colony	Established on August 22, 1904. Biggest leprosarium in the world during the 1920s.	Culion	Filipino	July 26, 2014	
Dulo ng Palawan; Ruta ng Ekspedisyong Magallanes–Elcano sa Pilipinas (Note: End of Palawan: Route of the Magellan–Elcano expedition in the Philippines)	Tuan Mahamud, Palawan leader, was captured by the expedition in exchange for food.	Brgy. Buliluyan, Bataraza	Filipino	November 9, 2021	
Fort Culion	Square stone fort built about 1740 by Recollect-Augustinians.	Culion	English	1939	
Fort Cuyo	Fort built about 1680 by Recollect-Augustinians under the plans of Rev. Juan de San Severo, A.R..	Cuyo	English	1939	
Fort Labo	Site of Fort Labo, built in 1719 by the Recollect and Augustinians to protect the town against pirates.	Labog, Sofronio Española (currently within NHCP storage)	English	1939	
Fort of San Juan Bautista	Constructed to protect the town from pirates. Maintained by the Recollect Augustinians.	Lutaya, Agutaya (currently within NHCP storage)	English	1939	
Higinio A. Mendoza (1898–1944)	Public servant and doctor. Established the Mendoza Guerilla Unit during World War II.	Puerto Princesa City	Filipino	2011	
Iwahig Penal Colony	Colony established on Nov 16 1904. Originally named Iuhuit Penal Settlement.	Puerto Princesa City	English	1954	
Kutang Santa Isabel (Note: Santa Isabel Fort)	First built by Recollects in 1667 using wood. Main station of the pacification campaign of the Spanish in Paragua (Palawan).	Taytay	Filipino	April 16, 1993	
Palawan; Ruta ng Ekspedisyong Magallanes–Elcano sa Pilipinas (Note: Palawan: Route of the Magellan–Elcano expedition in the Philippines)	From Mapun, the Magellan–Elcano expedition went to Palawan where they were first driven away by the locals.	Sitio Marikit, Barangay San Juan, Aborlan	Filipino	September 22, 2021	
Paglunsad sa Pulong Ramos (Note: Landing at Ramos Island)	Where six Filipino radio operators and technicians landed on June 8, 1944 to ready the liberation of Palawan.	Balabac	Filipino	July 8, 1997	
Plaza Cuartel	Military stronghold against the Japanese in WWII and site of the Palawan massacre.	Puerto Princesa	Filipino, English	March 5, 2005 (Filipino plaque), April 22, 2016 (English plaque)	
San Ezekiel Moreno (1848–1906) (Note: Saint Ezekiel Moreno (1848–1906))	Augustinian Recollect priest and saint, founder of the town of Puerto Princesa.	Puerto Princesa Cathedral	Filipino	December 8, 2014	
Tagusao (Dyguazam/Tegozzao); Ruta ng Ekspedisyong Magallanes–Elcano sa Pilipinas (Note: Tagusao (Dyguazam/Tegozzao): Route of the Magellan–Elcano expedition in the Philippines)	The expedition encountered Bastiam, a trader from the Mollucas who knows Portuguese.	Sitio Tagusao, Brgy. Barong-Barong, Brooke's Point	Filipino	October 19, 2021	

== Romblon ==
This table lists four markers from the province of Romblon.

Marker title	Description	Location	Language	Date issued	Image
Fort Romblon	Fort built in 1650 under the guidance of Rev. Pedro de San Agustin, A.R.	Fort San Andrés, Romblon	English	1939	
Gabriel Fabella; 1898–1982	Elected as representative of Romblon in 1935. One of the founders of the Philippine Historical Association.	In front of Banton Civic Center, Banton	Filipino	October 3, 2018	
Labanan sa Karagatan ng Sibuyan (Note: Battle of the Sibuyan Sea)	One of the greatest naval battles of WWII. Helped the American forces advance to Leyte.	Alcantara	Filipino	2007	
Manuel T. Alberto y Azores	Father of the Local Autonomy Bill. Helped established the towns of Corcuera and Magdiwang.	Corcuera	Filipino	April 30, 1983	

== See also ==
- List of Cultural Properties of the Philippines in Mimaropa

== Bibliography ==
- National Historical Institute (1994). Historical Markers: Regions I-IV. National Historical Institute.
- National Historical Institute (2008). Historical Markers (1992 - 2006). National Historical Institute.
- A list of sites and structures with historical markers, as of 16 January 2012
- A list of institutions with historical markers, as of 16 January 2012
