= Salvador del Mundo =

Salvador del Mundo (Spanish for "savior of the world") may refer to:

- Salvador del Mundo (chemist) (1902–1945), Filipino chemist
- Spanish ship Salvador del Mundo (1787), Spanish Navy ship of the line
- Salvador del Mundo, Asunción, neighborhood in Asunción, Paraguay
- San Salvador del Mundo Church, church in the Philippines
- Monumento al Divino Salvador del Mundo, monument in San Salvador, El Salvador

== See also ==
- San Salvador (disambiguation)
