= San Salvador (disambiguation) =

San Salvador (Spanish for "Holy Savior") is the capital of El Salvador.

San Salvador may also refer to:

== Places ==
- Metropolitan Area of San Salvador, El Salvador
- San Salvador Department, El Salvador
- San Salvador District, Peru
- San Salvador, Entre Ríos, Argentina
- San Salvador, Hidalgo, Mexico
- San Salvador Municipality, Hidalgo, Mexico
- San Salvador, Peru
- San Salvador, Valladolid, Spain
- San Salvador Atenco, Mexico
- San Salvador de Jujuy, Argentina
- San Salvador, Paraguay
- San Salvador, a former name of Tevego, Paraguay
- San Salvador, a former name of Keelung, Taiwan, when it served as the capital of Spanish Formosa (1626–1642)
- San Salvador, a former name of Salvador, Bahia, Brazil
- San Salvador (volcano), in El Salvador
- San Salvador Island, in the Bahamas
- Isla San Salvador, a former name of Santiago Island in the Galápagos Islands
- Province of San Salvador, a short-lived government established 1821 in present day El Salvador
- San Salvador Island, Columbus's name for Guanahani, the first island he reached in the Americas
- A former settlement area in California consisting of La Placita, California and Agua Mansa, California
- San Salvador, Caguas, Puerto Rico, a barrio

== Ships ==
- San Salvador (Cabrillo's ship), Juan Rodríguez Cabrillo's flagship
- San Salvador (replica ship), a replica of Cabrillo's flagship built by the Maritime Museum of San Diego
- San Salvador, the Spanish flagship at the Battle of the Downs
- San Salvador (Guipúzcoan squadron), a ship of the Guipúzcoa Squadron in the Spanish Armada; there was another ship of the same name in the Spanish Armada in a different squadron
- Salvador del Mundo, a 122-gun ship

== Other uses ==
- San Salvador, Venice, a church in Venice, Italy
- San Salvador F.C., a football (soccer) club of San Salvador
- San Salvador (band), an Australian reggae rock band featuring members of Sounds Like Chicken
- San Salvador ("Holy Savior"), a title of Jesus Christ in Spanish
- San Salvador, the Spanish name of St Salvador of Horta (1520–1567), a Spanish saint
- Towers of the churches of San Salvador and Santa Cruz (Madrid)

== See also ==
- Sant Salvador (disambiguation)
- Salvador del Mundo (disambiguation)
- São Salvador (disambiguation), several places and a variant spelling of some of the above
