= Sant Salvador =

Sant Salvador may refer to:

- Sant Salvador de Breda, parish church and former Benedictine monastery in Breda
- Sant Salvador de Guardiola, village in the comarca of Bages
- Sant Salvador de la Vedella, Benedictine monastery in Catalonia

== See also ==
- San Salvador (disambiguation)
