= São Salvador =

São Salvador may refer to:

- M'banza-Kongo, Angola, capital of Zaire Province and of the defunct Kongo Kingdom, known as São Salvador in Portuguese 1570-1975
- Salvador, Bahia, Brazil, capital of the State of Bahia
- São Salvador do Mundo, Cape Verde, a municipality on the island of Santiago

== See also ==
- San Salvador (disambiguation)
