= Romblon Wind Farm =

Wind power plant in the Philippines

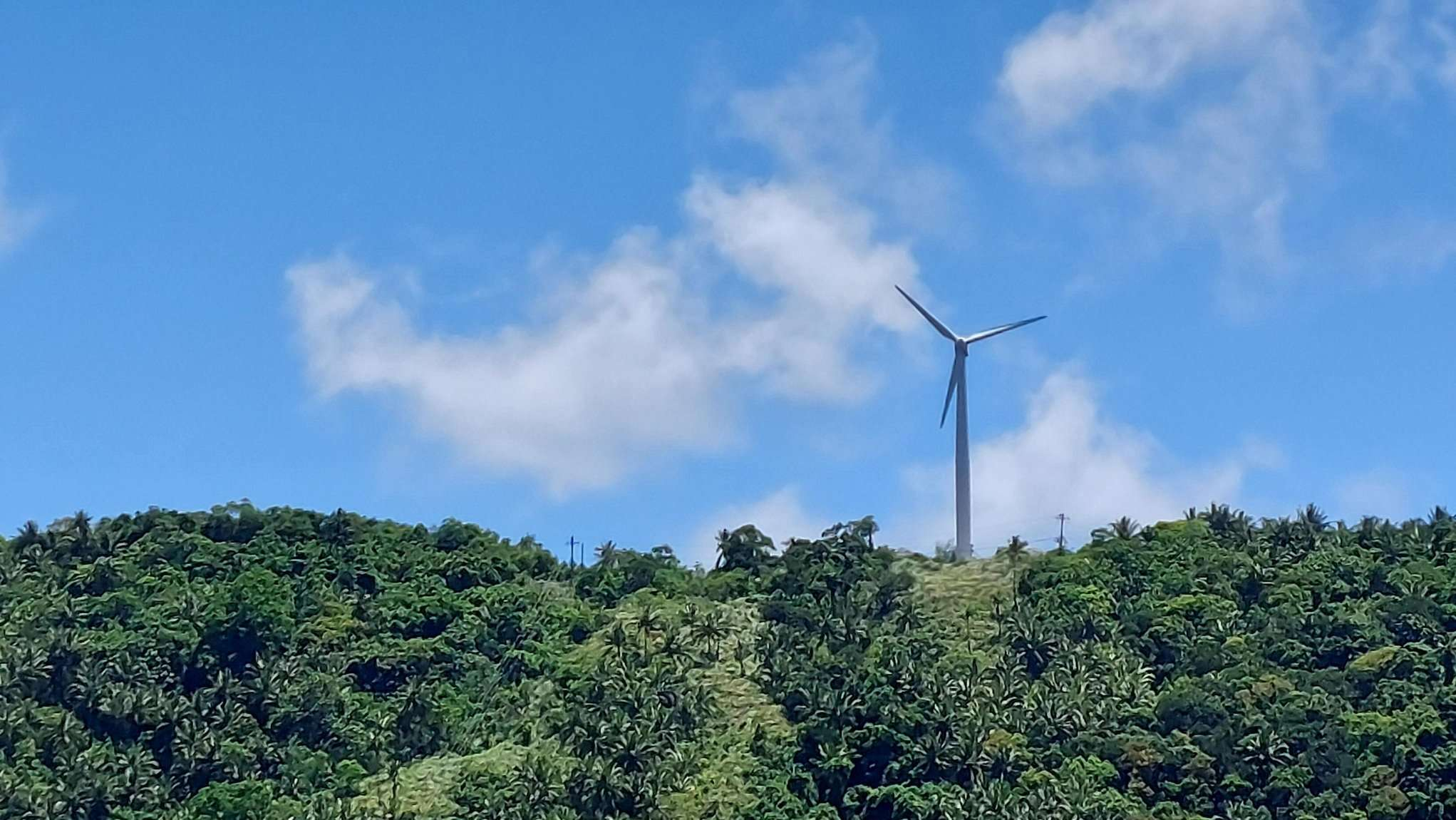
- One of the three 300 kW turbines of the Romblon Wind Farm in Romblon, Romblon.
- Country: Philippines
- Location: Romblon, Romblon
- Coordinates: 12.574185235831605°N 122.25935475531664°E
- Status: Operational
- Construction began: 2018
- Commission date: February 10, 2019
- Construction cost: PH₱242 million
- Owners: Komaihaltec Inc. and Honda Motor Co. Ltd. (until 2023) Romblon Electric Cooperative (after 2023)
- Operator: Romblon Electric Cooperative

Wind farm
- Type: Onshore
- Hub height: 41.5 m (136 ft)
- Rotor diameter: 33 m (108 ft)
- Rated wind speed: 11 m/s

Power generation
- Nameplate capacity: 900 kW (3 turbines x 300 kW)

External links
- Commons: Related media on Commons

Romblon Wind Farm is a wind farm in Romblon, Romblon, Philippines. The wind farm uses three units of 41.5-meter (136 ft) high Komaihaltec KWT300 wind turbines erected on the hills of Barangays Agnay, Bagacay and Lonos in Romblon, Romblon. The wind farm is a project of Romblon Electric Cooperative (ROMELCO) and was made possible through a funding grant from Japanese companies Komaihaltec Inc. and Honda Motor Co. Ltd. The wind turbines were erected in 2018 and began operation in 2019. Under the contract between ROMELCO, Komaihaltec Inc., and Honda Motor Co. Ltd., the wind farm will be turned over to ROMELCO in 2023 after a four-year demonstration period.

Aside from providing Romblon with a total of 900 kW of electricity, the wind turbines power 100 units of Honda PCX electric scooters that were leased to select townsfolk for PH₱2,000 a month for four years and can be charged in any of the five charging stations set up in the island municipality.

== History ==
Since 16 January 1990, Romblon, the capital of Romblon Province, and its over 40,000 residents, relies on diesel power plants for its electrical power needs. Romblon Electric Cooperative (ROMELCO), the main power distributor in the province, sources its electricity from a 1.720 MW diesel power plant and a 1.30 MW power barge on Romblon Bay operated by the National Power Corporation. Diesel fuel used to operate the power plants are transported by ship and this presents a risk to the townsfolk because not only does the extra cost of get passed on to consumers through higher electricity rates, the power supply also often gets interrupted when diesel shipments to island gets delayed by inclement weather or other conditions cause fuel supplies to run out. The carbon dioxide emitted by diesel power plants during generation also has a larger impact on the island's natural environment.

Under the administration of general manager Rene M. Fajilagutan, ROMELCO began switching to renewable energy sources such as mini hydro and solar power to reduce its dependence on fossil fuels to generate electricity in areas of its jurisdiction in Romblon. Renewables account for 39 percent of the electricity that ROMELCO provides to its customers — these include a 900 kW mini hydro power plant at Barangay Cantigas in San Fernando and solar-diesel hybrid power plant in Cobrador Island that has a 30 kW solar photovoltaic capacity and a 15 kW diesel generator. ROMELCO's plan was to increase this capacity to 90 percent by 2020.

In 2016, Komaihaltec Inc., a Japanese company specializing in renewable energy projects, was looking for areas in Southeast Asia to export its KWT300 wind turbines in an effort promote renewable energy in rural areas. During a visit to Romblon that year, Leiko Toyoda, planning manager for Komaihaltec's Renewable Energy and Overseas Business Department, proposed to ROMELCO's Fajilagutan the construction of KWT300 wind turbines in the island to provide renewable energy to households, and so the project began. The project cost of PH₱242 million was shouldered by Komaihaltec and Honda Motor Co. Ltd. through a subsidy from the Japanese Ministry of Environment's Financing Programme to Demonstrate Advanced Low-Carbon Technology Innovation for Further Deployment in Developing Countries.

Under the project agreement, Komaihaltec will manufacture, deliver, and erect the three wind turbines in Romblon while ROMELCO participated in the project by acquiring the land where the wind turbines and the battery charging stations were built, securing the necessary permits for the construction to commence, as well as managing the wind farm's operations during the four-year demonstration period. Honda participated in the project by constructing five battery charging stations in the island, in Barangays Basiao, Capaclan, Cajimos, Lonos, and Sablayan, and leasing 100 units of its Honda PCX electric scooters to eligible residents for PH₱2,000 a month for four years. The scooters are equipped with two removable batteries and are designed to run 41-kilometer (25 mi) per charge at a speed of 60-kilometer-per-hour (37 mph). Once the electric scooters were turned over to the users, they can charge the scooter's removable battery packs in any of the charging stations for six hours and exchange it with a fully charged battery pack.

After the demonstration period in 2023, Komaihaltec and Honda will turn over the project entirely to ROMELCO. Construction of the wind farm began in October 2018 with the delivery of the wind turbine components to Romblon with the erection of the wind turbines commencing the following month. The wind farm officially opened on 10 February 2019 with representatives of Komaihaltec and Honda Japan in attendance. The wind farm has a combined capacity to generate 2,000,100 kWh of green energy or 25 percent of the total annual energy requirement of the province.

== See also ==
- Sustainable energy
- Wind Energy Power System (Philippines Wind Farm)
