= Historic Bridges of Romblon =

Spanish colonial bridges in the Philippines

- Mga Makasaysayang Tulay ng Romblon (Filipino)
- Puente de Romblon, one of the historic bridges in Romblon, Romblon built during the Spanish colonial era.

- Location of the Historic Bridges of Romblon in the Philippines
- Puente de Belen 12.5756513°N 122.2704636°E; Puente de Rio Casalogan 12.5740436°N 122.2699016°E; Puente de Romblon12.5761197°N 122.2703932°E; Puente de la Paz12.5770867°N 122.2703463°E; Puente Progreso12.5741001°N 122.2708773°E
- Location: Romblon, Romblon, Philippines

Site notes
- Management: National Museum of the Philippines

The Historic Bridges of Romblon (Filipino: Mga Makasaysayang Tulay ng Romblon) are a group of bridges that were built during the Spanish and American colonial era over the Casalogan River in the town of Romblon, Romblon in the Philippines. In March 2013, these bridges were declared an Important Cultural Property by the Philippine government and was placed under the protection and conservation of the National Museum of the Philippines.

== History ==
Puente de Belen, one of the bridges in Romblon built in the 1860s during the Spanish colonial era.

The town of Romblon, which is also the capital of Romblon Province, lies on the island of Romblon between Tablas Island and Sibuyan Island. Situated in a small valley surrounded by several hills, the town is spanned by the Casalogan River which drains into the town's harbor. It was in this valley that the Spanish colonizers established the first permanent settlement in the island in 1571.

As the town's population grew in the ensuing decades, Spanish colonial authorities expanded the settlement inland toward the source of the Casalogan River and so houses and structures were built along the banks of the river. To facilitate easier movement of people and goods throughout the settlement, the Spanish colonial authorities commissioned the construction of several bridges over the river during the 1860s. Using local labor and materials such as limestone and coral stone, they built three bridges over the river that were parallel to each other: Puente de Rio Casalogan, Puente de Belen and Puente de Romblon.

When the Americans annexed the Philippines in 1898, the American colonial government established a civilian government on the island on 16 March 1901. During this period, two additional bridges were constructed over the river. Puente Progreso, built over the Basiao Creek (a tributary of the Casalogan River), was completed on 27 October 1925 during the administration of Governor Inocencio Gonzales, while Puente de la Paz was completed on 23 July 1934 during the administration of Governor Jose Perez. Both bridges were built using concrete.

== Bridges ==
=== Spanish era bridges ===
- Puente de Belen - Located along P. Mayor Street in Barangay I, near the Traída de Aguas fountain and the Old Municipal Building. Built during the 1860s, the bridge has two arches standing on three abutments. Its parapets feature wedge coping made of bricks but with two stone benches on either side integrated into the structure.
- Puente de Rio Casalogan - Located along Rizal Street in Barangay IV, between its intersection with Basina and Mendez Streets. It is the tallest of the Spanish colonial bridges and the closest to the source of the Casalogan River. Built during the 1860s, the bridge has two arches standing on three abutments. The parapets on either side of the bridge are composed of wedge coping made of stone but without embellishments.
- Puente de Romblon - Located along Bagong Lipunan Street in Barangay I, beside Romblon West Central School and near the town plaza. Built during the 1860s, the bridge has two arches standing on three abutments. Its parapets are differ significantly from Puente de Belen and Puente de Rio Casalogan as it features curved parapets supported by two small columns on either end and a taller decorated column in the middle.

=== American era bridges ===
- Puente Progreso - Located along Quezon Street in Barangay III, between its intersection with Sampaguita and F. Moreno Sr. Streets. Built over the Basiao Creek, a tributary of the Casalogan River and completed on 27 October 1925. The 4.56 metres (15 ft) bridge is made of concrete and is in fair condition as of 2019, according to the Department of Public Works and Highways (DWPH).
- Puente de la Paz - Located along Fetalvero Street in Barangay I, beside the Romblon Public Market. The 5.75 metres (19 ft) bridge was completed on 23 July 1934 and made of concrete. It is also known as Puente de Fetalvero after the former governor, Juan Fetalvero, for whom the street is named after. The bridge is in poor condition as of 2019 according to the DPWH.

== Important Cultural Property ==
On 19 March 2013, the National Museum of the Philippines declared the Historic Bridges of Romblon as Important Cultural Property (Category II), being more than 50 years old already. The declaration places the bridges under the protection and preservation of the Philippine government through the National Museum of the Philippines by virtue of the National Cultural Heritage Act of 2009.

== See also ==
- Spanish colonial bridges in Tayabas
- Bridge of Isabel II
