= List of Cultural Properties of the Philippines in Pinamalayan, Oriental Mindoro =

This is a list of Cultural Properties of the Philippines in Pinamalayan, Oriental Mindoro.

Cultural Property wmph identifier (Note: wmph is an internal identifier used by Wikimedia Philippines to identify the monument. This is not an official identifier, and only shown temporarily in the templates until the government creates an updated complete list.)	Site name	Description	Province	City or municipality	Address	Coordinates	Image
	Benito Hall (formerly St. Augustine Parish Church)	Dubbed as "One Dollar Mission Church" for Rev Fr. Benito Rixner's efforts to solicit funding for its construction, St. Augustine Church was built in 1938.	Oriental Mindoro	Pinamalayan, Oriental Mindoro	Madrid Avenue	13°01′59″N 121°29′16″E	Upload file
	Imamculate Heart of Mary Academy	built in 1946 and run by the Sisters Servants of the Holy Spirit	Oriental Mindoro	Pinamalayan, Oriental Mindoro	Madrid Avenue	13°01′58″N 121°29′19″E	Upload file
	Juan Morente Sr. Memorial Pilot School	Gabaldon Building	Oriental Mindoro	Pinamalayan, Oriental Mindoro	A. Mabini Blvd.	13°02′15″N 121°29′04″E	Upload file
	San Agustin Ancestral House	1922	Oriental Mindoro	Pinamalayan, Oriental Mindoro	Burgos (Jaena) cor. Mabini St.	13°02′09″N 121°29′13″E	Upload file
	Evora House	1952	Oriental Mindoro	Pinamalayan, Oriental Mindoro	Burgos (Jaena)	13°02′10″N 121°29′14″E	Upload file
	Jacob House	1964	Oriental Mindoro	Pinamalayan, Oriental Mindoro	Burgos (Jaena)	13°02′11″N 121°29′14″E	Upload file
	Celestino Magol House	pre-1940	Oriental Mindoro	Pinamalayan, Oriental Mindoro	Juan Luna St.	13°02′09″N 121°29′15″E	Upload file
	Antonio Morente House	unknown date of construction	Oriental Mindoro	Pinamalayan, Oriental Mindoro	Bonifacio St. cor. Mabini St.	13°02′06″N 121°29′17″E	Upload file
	Gusali Mendoza Torres	unknown date of construction	Oriental Mindoro	Pinamalayan, Oriental Mindoro	Morente (Malvar) St. cor. Mabini St.	13°02′02″N 121°29′23″E	Upload file
	Natividad De Joya-Morente Ancestral House	1935	Oriental Mindoro	Pinamalayan, Oriental Mindoro	Morente (Malvar) St.	13°02′05″N 121°29′24″E	Upload file
	Pinamalayan Vocational School	1960s	Oriental Mindoro	Pinamalayan, Oriental Mindoro	Morente (Malvar) St.	13°02′01″N 121°29′18″E	Upload file
	Aling Piling Ancestral House	unknown date of construction	Oriental Mindoro	Pinamalayan, Oriental Mindoro	Morente (Malvar) St.	13°01′59″N 121°29′21″E	Upload file
	Dr. Gonzales House	1950	Oriental Mindoro	Pinamalayan, Oriental Mindoro	Morente (Malvar) St. cor. Madrid St.	13°01′58″N 121°29′21″E	Upload file
