= Sant Salvador de la Vedella =

Benedictine monastery in Cercs, Spain

Coordinates: 42.169247°N 1.862514°E

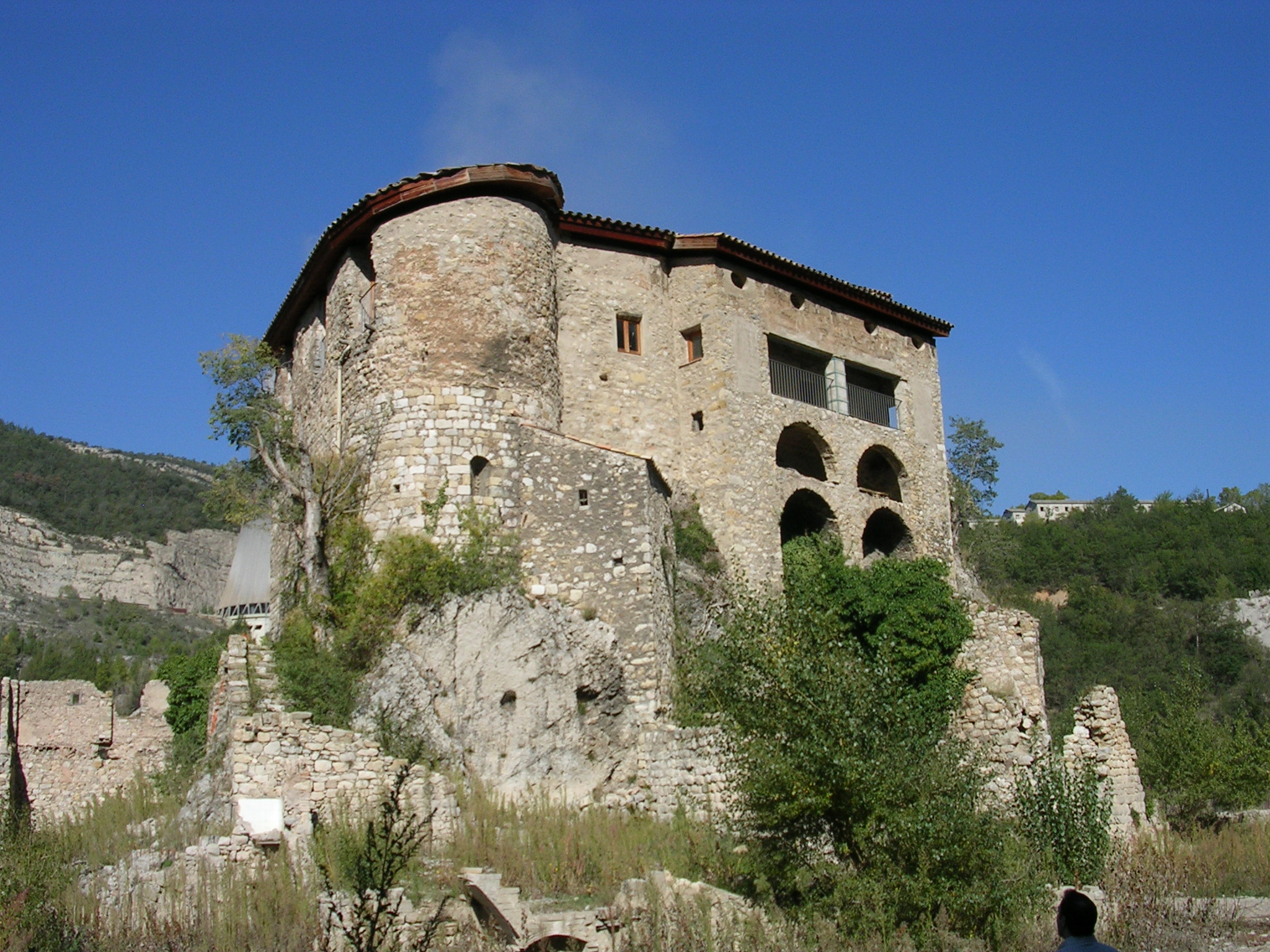
Sant Salvador de la Vedella

Sant Salvador de la Vedella is a Benedictine monastery Catalonia, Spain. The Romanesque building is situated near the municipality of Cercs, in Berguedà comarca, province of Barcelona. It was founded by the monks of the Monastery of Sant Serni de Tavèrnoles in the year 830. Carlot Tavèrnoles became the abbot in the 835. After the 12th century its importance declined. Until the year 1580, it was associated with the seminary at La Seu d'Urgell.

In 1976, several surrounding villages were cleared; the Baells Reservoir was created and the monastery was surrounded by water.

In the 21st century, the remains include the church, rectory and priory. The altar, chalice and paten are held at the Museu Episcopal de Vich, as well as a carving of Christ The King.

A drought in April 2023 meant that it was again possible to walk to the monastery.

== Bibliography ==
- Pladevall, Antoni (2001). Guies Catalunya Romànica, El Berguedà. Barcelona, Portic, ISBN 84-7306-697-9 (in Catalan).
