= Twin Forts of Romblon =

Spanish fortifications in Romblon, Philippines

- Magkaparis na Tanggulan ng Romblon (Filipino)
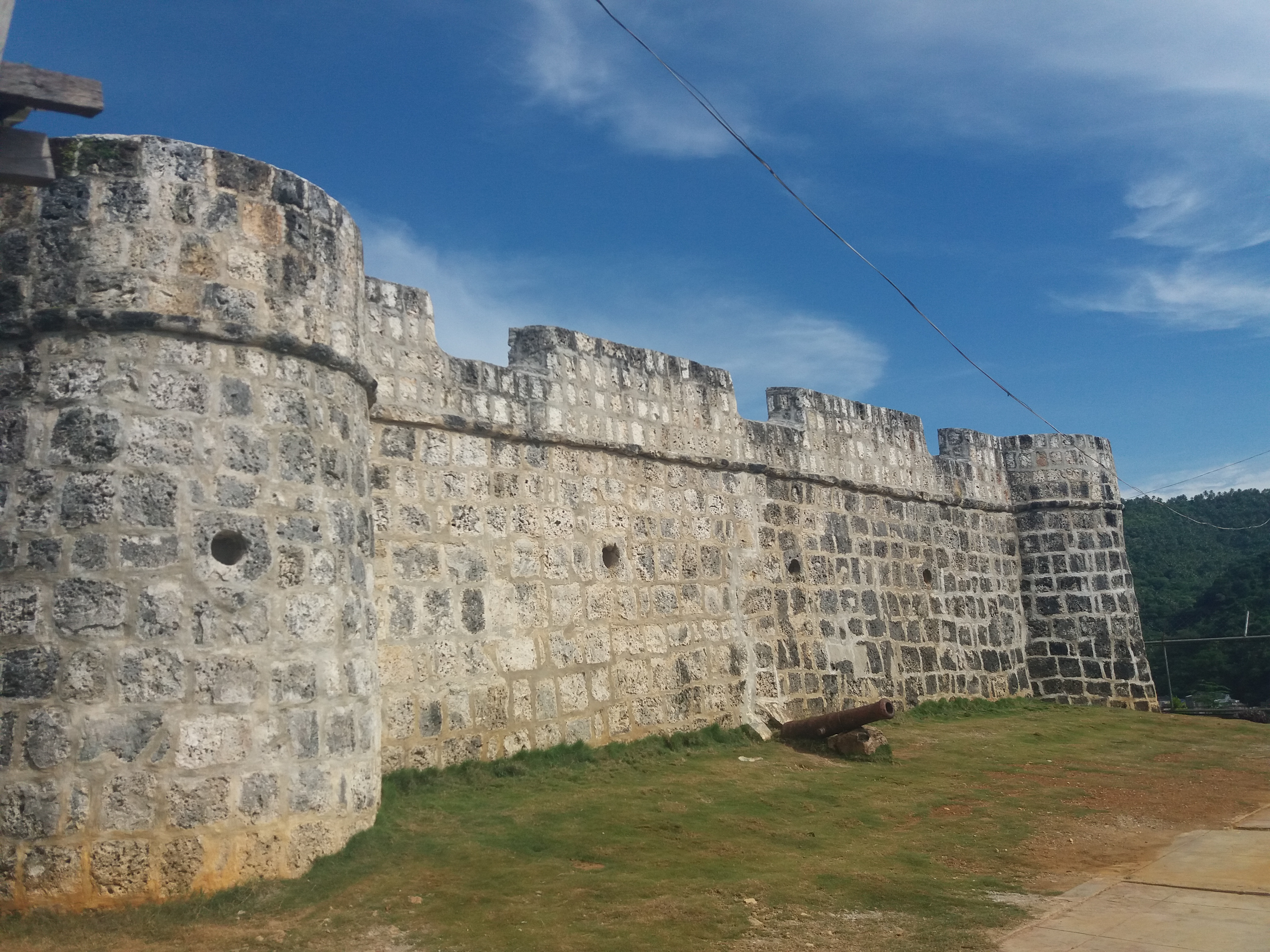
- Fort San Andres in May 2017, part of the Twin Forts of Romblon.

- Location of Twin Forts of Romblon in the Philippines
- 12.5785842°N 122.2701715°E
- Location: Romblon, Romblon, Philippines

Site notes
- Management: National Museum of the Philippines

The Twin Forts of Romblon (Filipino: Magkaparis na Tanggulan ng Romblon) are a pair of Spanish fortifications located in the town of Romblon, Romblon in the Philippines. It was built by the Spanish in 1644 to protect the town from Muslim raids and Dutch piracy in the country during the Eighty Years' War. In 2013, the site has been declared a National Cultural Treasure under the protection of the Philippine government through the National Museum of the Philippines.

== History ==
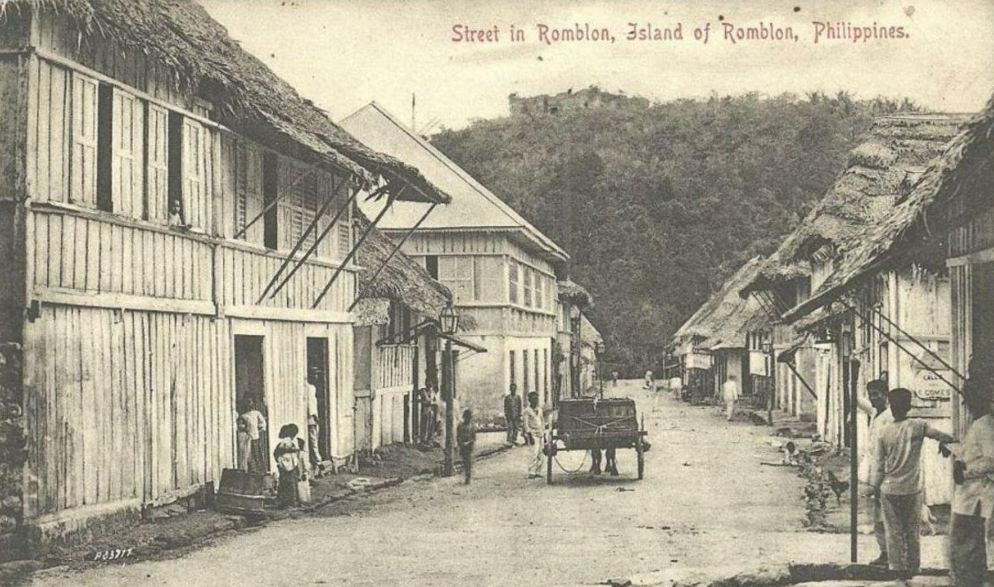
The town of Romblon in the early 1900s, showing Fort San Andres in the background.

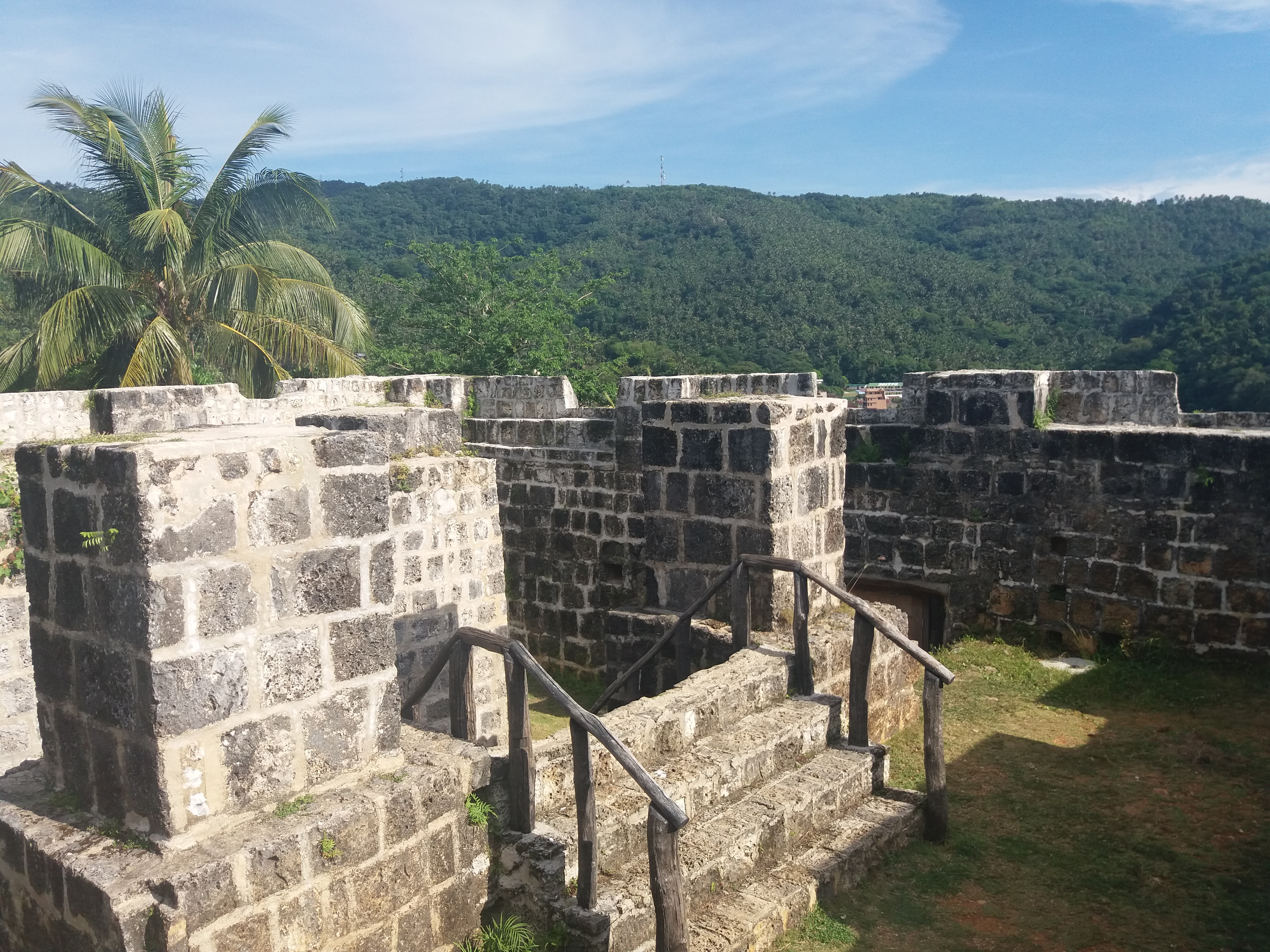
A look inside Fort San Andres.

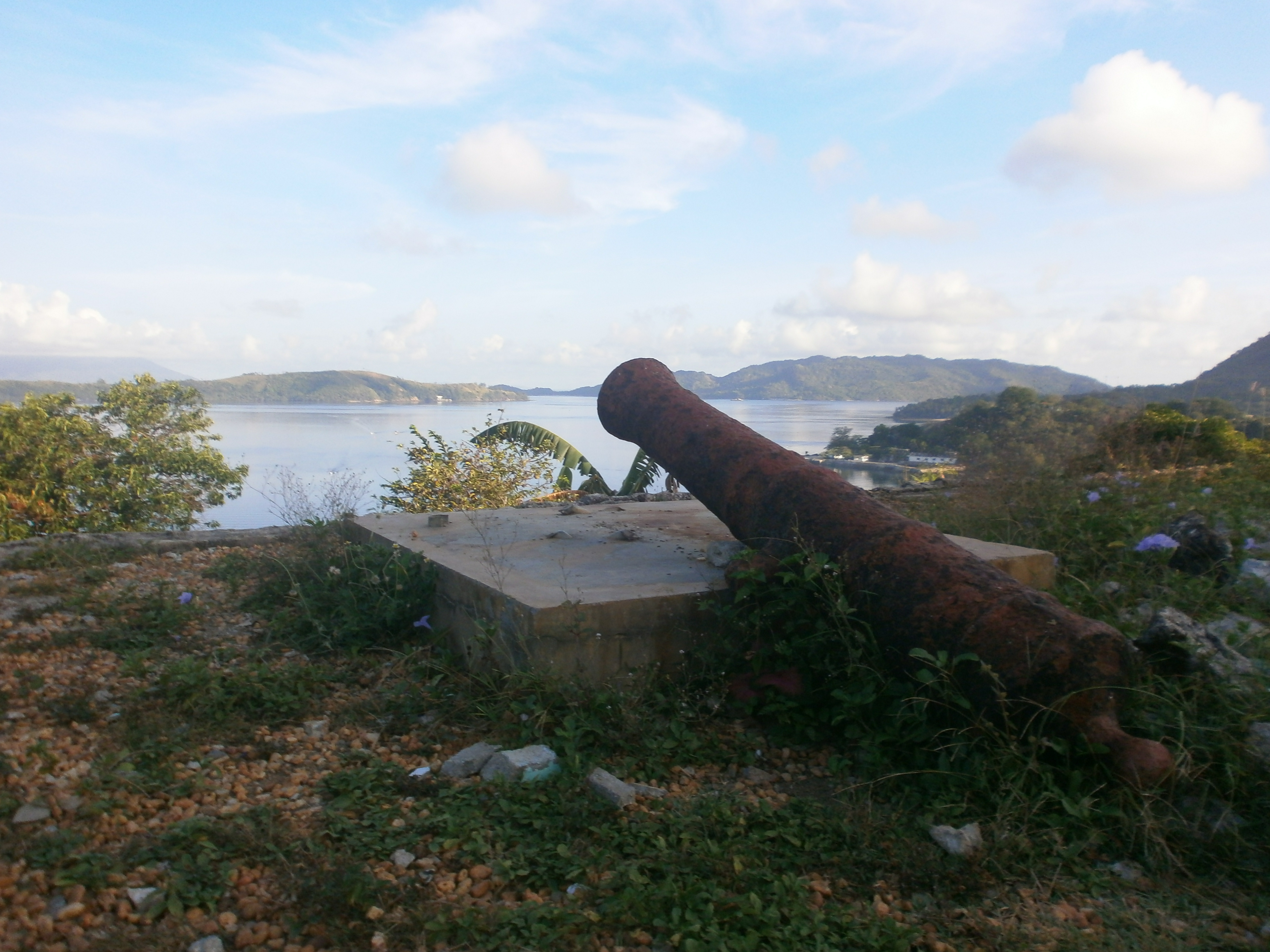
One of the Spanish-era cannons at Fort San Andres.

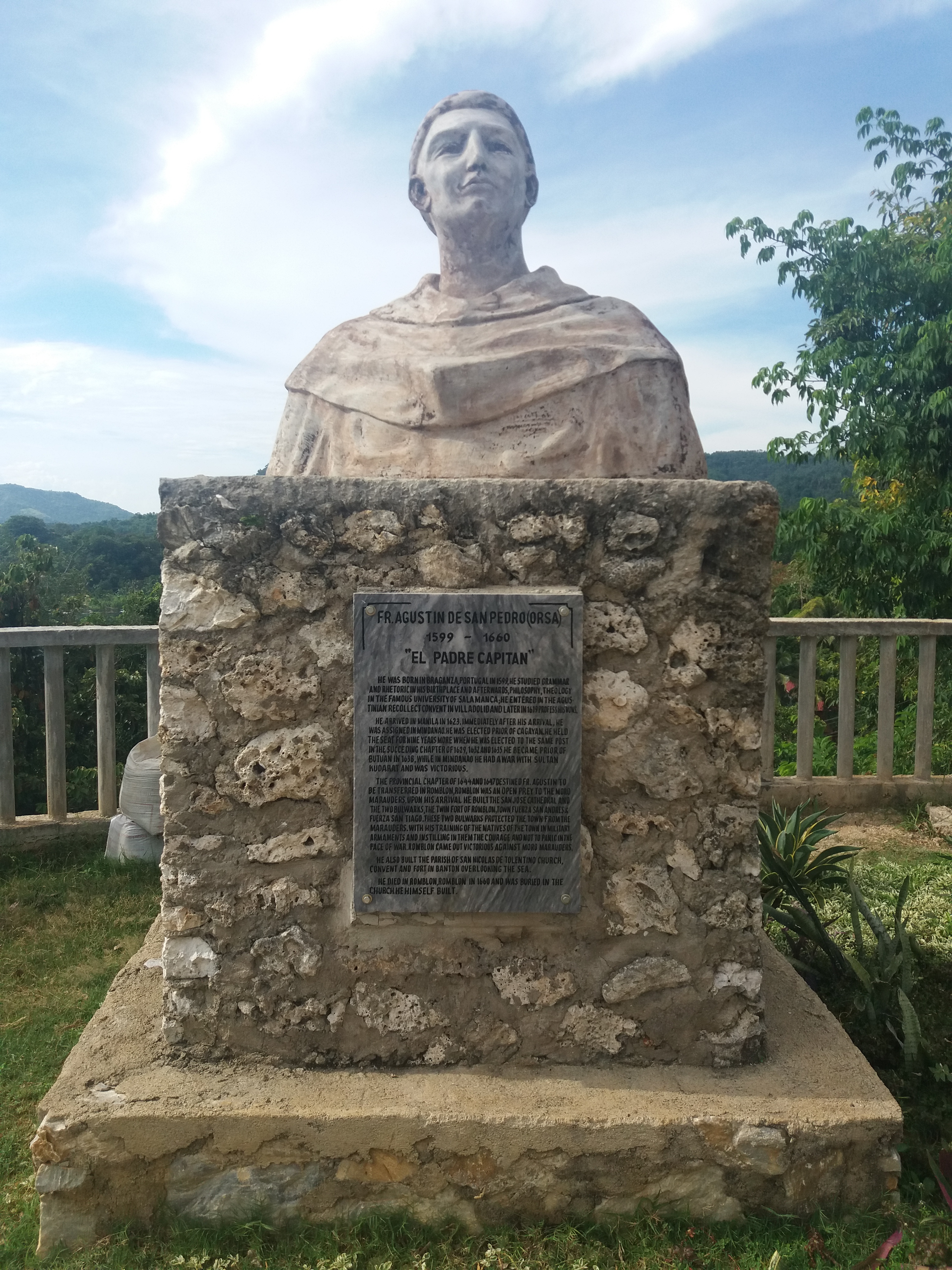
The monument of Spanish priest Agustin de San Pedro, who supervised the construction of Fort San Andres.

In 1569, Spanish colonizers arrived in Romblon led by conquistador Martin de Goiti who was dispatched by Miguel López de Legazpi to explore the western and northern portion of the Visayas region including Romblon and Mindoro. The Spanish later organized the archipelago into three encomiendas and were administered from Arevalo. In 1582, Spanish chronicler Miguel de Loarca visited Romblon and conducted the first census of the islands.

In 1635, Augustinian Recollect missionaries arrived in Romblon to establish Catholic missions and settlements. They helped the Spanish authorities establish peace and order in the islands. With Spain's involvement in the Eighty Years' War beginning in 1568, these missions and settlements soon became vulnerable to piracy by the Dutch East India Company. In an attack in 1646, the Dutch pillaged and destroyed the town of Romblon. The town was also a frequent target of Muslim pirates from Mindanao, who have been at war with the Spanish since 1565.

To help protect their colonial settlements and outposts from Dutch and Muslim piracy, the Spanish colonial government ordered the construction of various fortifications and watchtowers throughout the country. In Romblon, the construction of fortifications was supervised by Augustinian Recollect priest Agustin de San Pedro, also known as "El Padre Capitan". In 1644, San Pedro began supervision for the construction of twin fortifications atop Calvary Hill and San Antonio Hill overlooking Romblon town. These fortifications were built by local laborers using locally available coral and limestone. Upon completion in 1650, the twin forts were dedicated and named Fuerza de Santiago (after Saint James the Great) and Fuerza de San Andres (after Saint Andrew).

== Features ==
Currently, Fort San Andres is the only surviving structure of the Twin Forts of Romblon, as Fort Santiago atop Calvary Hill is now in ruins and has been covered by wildlife. Fort San Andres is located between Barangay II and Barangay Capaclan, atop San Antonio Hill which overlooks the town and its natural harbor. It is accessible via a stone staircase from Termopilas Street as well as through the narrow access road from Sabang Road. The fort is quadrilateral in shape, with four turrets on each corner, and has a total area of 290 square metres (3,100 sq ft). The four walls and towers of the fort each have a parapet with three embrasures from which cannons can be fired toward enemy positions. There is a wooden door on the southern wall of the fort through which serve as its primary entrance. On the middle of the fort are four stone columns that used to provide support for a thatched roof that used to cover the part of the fort facing away from the sea.

== National Cultural Treasure ==
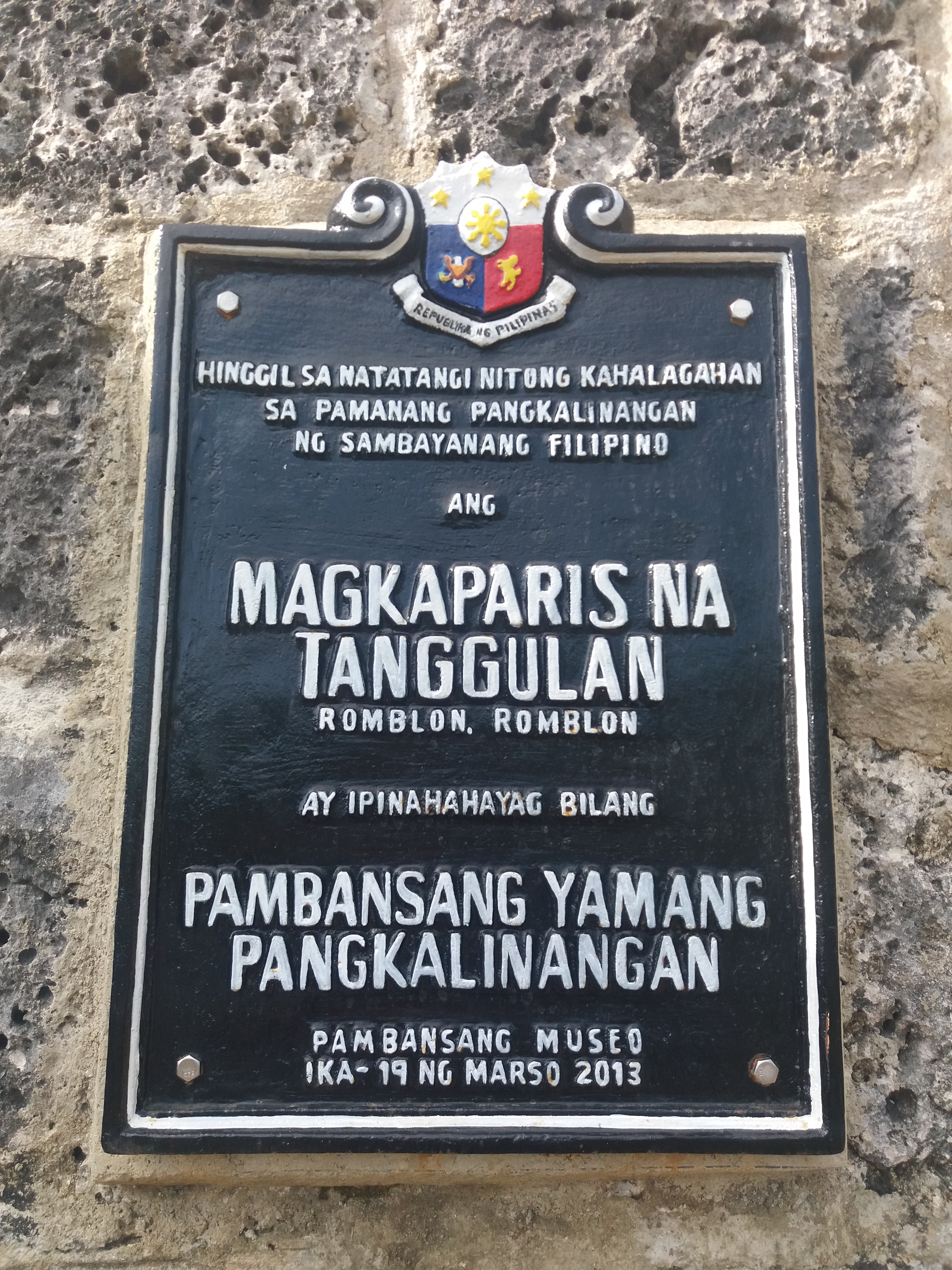
National Cultural Treasure marker

In 2013, the National Museum of the Philippines declared the Twin Forts of Romblon, along with the town's Spanish colonial bridges, the Saint Joseph Cathedral, and its Triada de Aguas fountain as National Cultural Treasures. The declaration places the fort under the protection and conservation of the Philippine government through the National Museum. A plaque was installed on the fort that year marking its designation.

In 2012, prior to its designation as a National Cultural Treasure, the fort underwent extensive restoration conducted by the National Commission for Culture and the Arts (NCAA). The restoration, which involved the restoration and replacement of missing coral stone in both interior and exterior walls, the removal of earth fill at the interior chamber and the provision of drainage system, the reinforcement of the wall foundation, rehabilitation of the remaining two turrets, rehabilitation of the top section of the fort, and rip rapping around the fort to prevent soil erosion, was funded through a ₱2 million grant from the agency. The restoration was supported by the local government and the Save the Fort San Andres Movement, Inc., a local non-profit organization advocating for the conservation of the fort.

== See also ==
- Fuerza de San José
- Romblon
- Fort Santiago
- Fort Pilar
- Fort San Pedro
- Fort Santa Isabel
- Spanish Colonial Fortifications of the Philippines
