= Romblon, Romblon =

Capital of Romblon, Philippines

Romblon
- Municipality
- Municipality of Romblon
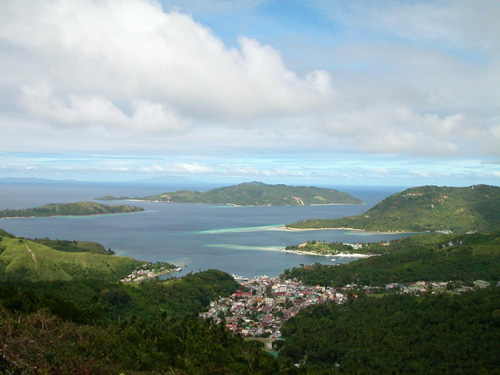
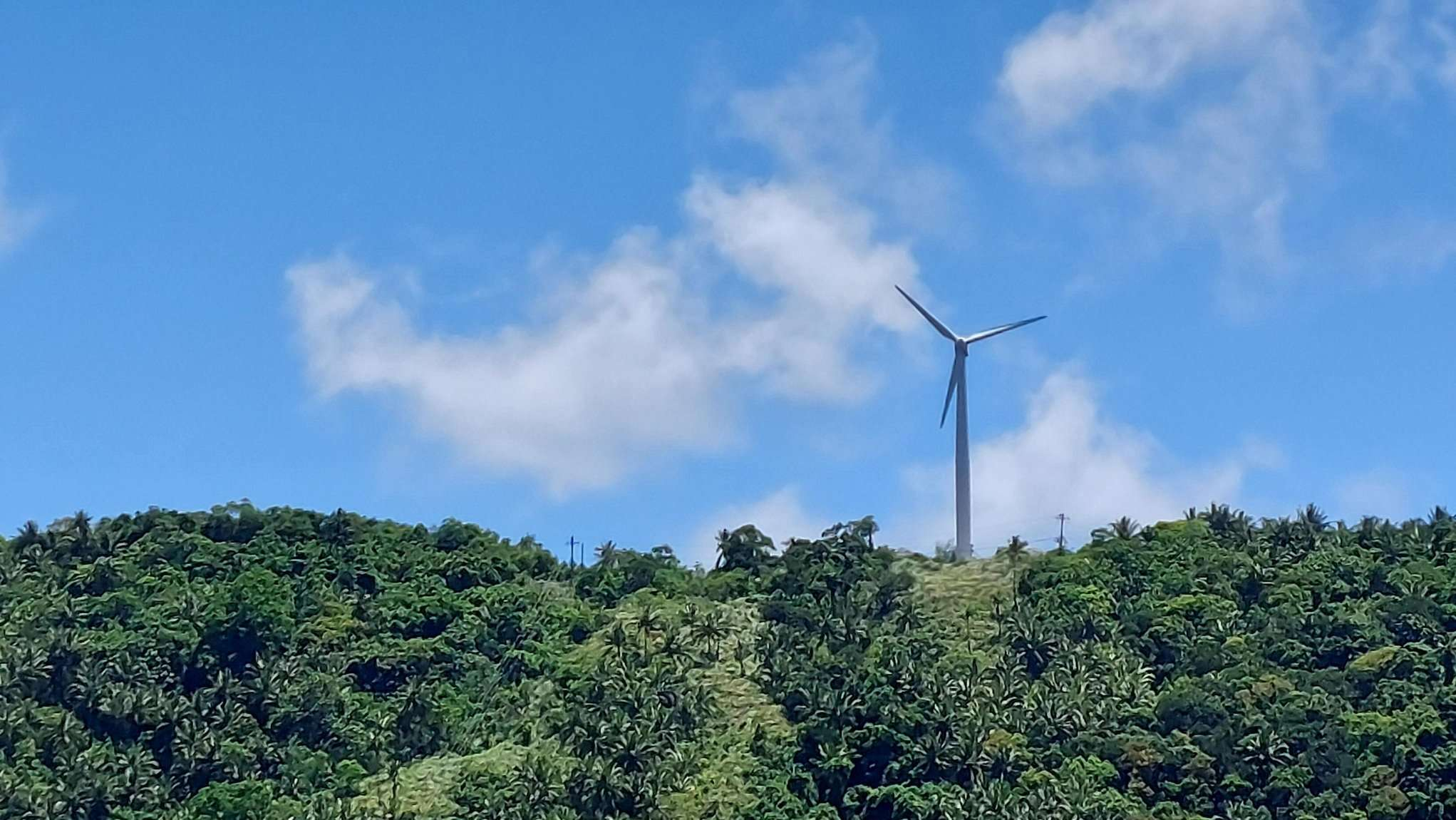
- Romblon poblacion and Romblon Bay Romblon Wind Farm Town Plaza

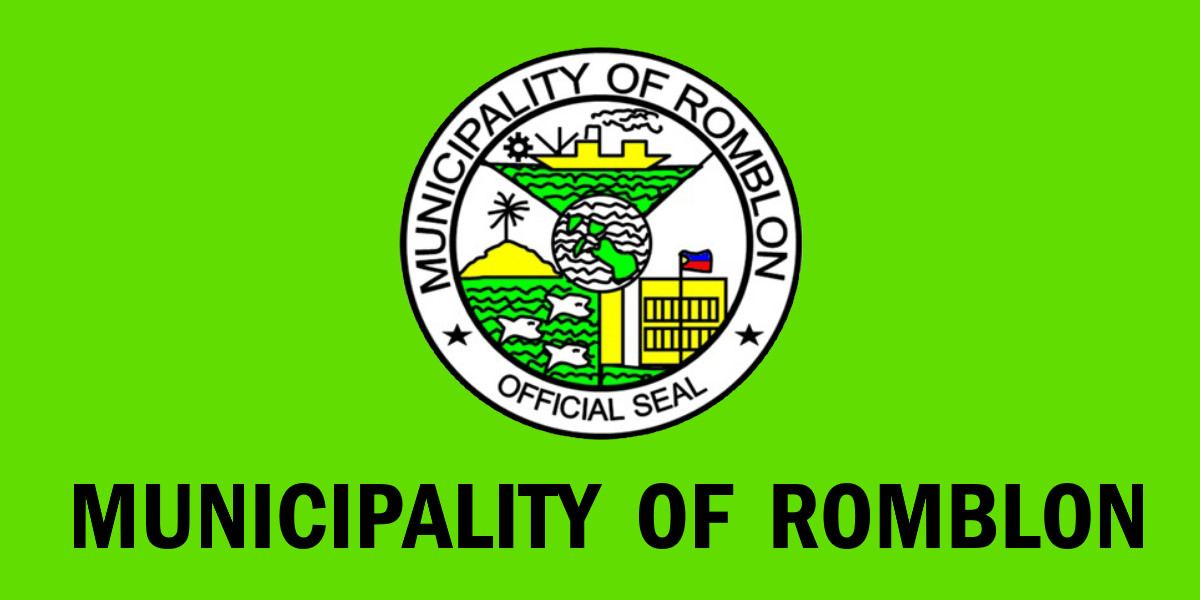
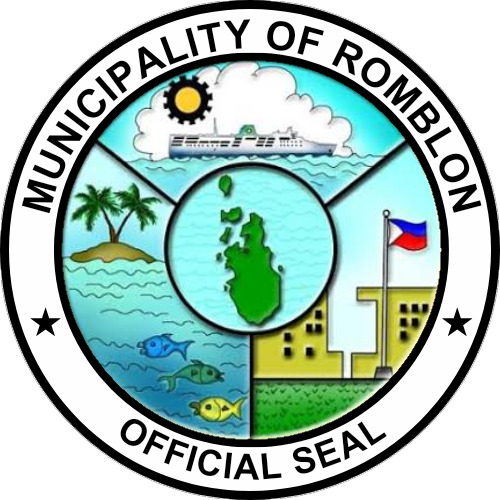
- Flag Seal

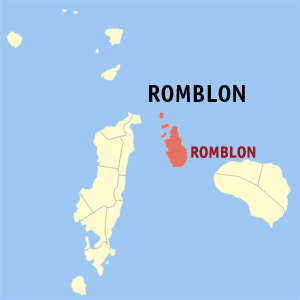
- Map of Romblon with Romblon highlighted
- Interactive map of Romblon
- Location within the Philippines
- Coordinates: 12°34′44″N 122°16′29″E
- Country: Philippines
- Region: Mimaropa
- Province: Romblon
- District: Lone district
- Founded: 1571 (as encomienda)
- Incorporated: 1631 (as pueblo)
- Barangays: 31 (see Barangays)

Government
  - Type: Sangguniang Bayan
  - Mayor: Gerard Sy Montojo
  - Vice Mayor: Mariano "Anoy" M. Mateo
  - Representative: Eleandro Jesus F. Madrona
  - Electorate: 27,273 voters (2025)

Area
  - Total: 86.87 km^{2} (33.54 sq mi)
- Highest elevation (Mount Lagting): 464 m (1,522 ft)
- Lowest elevation: 0 m (0 ft)

Population (2024 census)
  - Total: 39,004
  - Density: 449.0/km^{2} (1,163/sq mi)
  - Households: 10,406

Economy
  - Income class: 2nd municipal income class
  - Poverty incidence: 25.69% (2023)
  - Revenue: ₱ 194.2 million (2024)
  - Assets: ₱ 309.4 million (2024)
  - Expenditure: ₱ 179.9 million (2024)
  - Liabilities: ₱ 28.76 million (2024)

Service provider
  - Electricity: Romblon Electric Cooperative (ROMELCO)
- Time zone: UTC+8 (PST)
- ZIP code: 5500
- PSGC: 1705910000
- IDD : area code: +63 (0)42
- Native languages: Romblomanon; Tagalog
- Website: www.romblon.gov.ph

Romblon, officially the Municipality of Romblon, is a municipality and titular capital of the province of Romblon, Philippines. According to the 2024 census, it has a population of 39,004 people. The archipelagic municipality is the capital of the province of the same name and the seat of its provincial government. It includes Romblon Island as well as the nearby islands of Alad, Cobrador, and Logbon.

Romblon island is one of the three major islands of the province, aside from Sibuyan Island and Tablas Island. As the capital of the province, its natives mostly speak Romblomanon or Ini language. Romblon is known for its local marble industry and is the second biggest producer of the mineral in the country. It is also a tourist destination because of its unspoiled beaches and Spanish-era twin forts.

== History ==
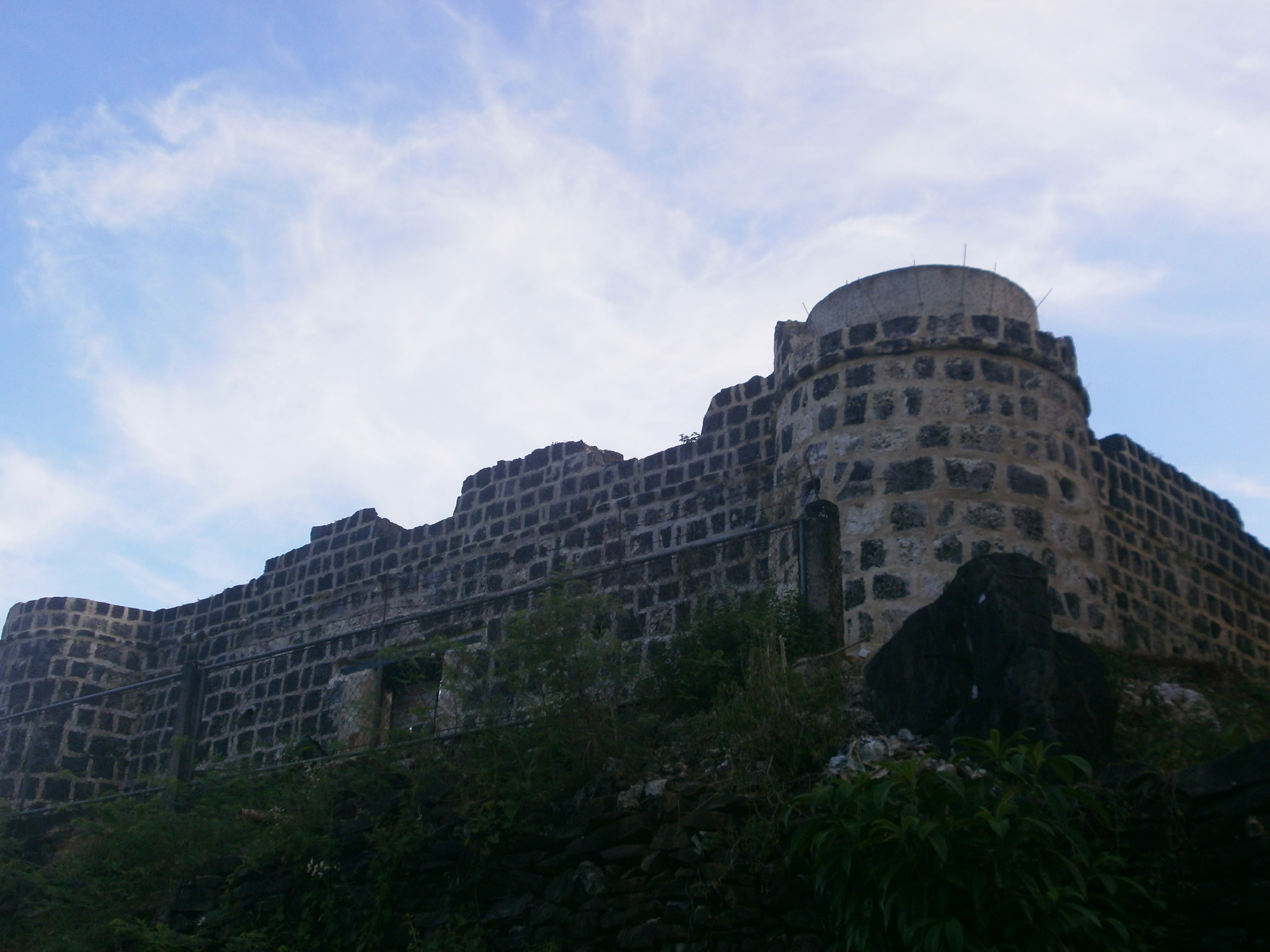
Fuerza de San Andres, one of the Twin Forts of Romblon, a National Cultural Treasure as declared by the NCCA

=== Early history ===
The first inhabitants of Romblon were the Negritos tribes of Panay and the Mindoro-Mangyan tribes. The discovery of hanging coffins and artistic material in the caves of Banton Island demonstrates the existence of a rich and ancient civilization and aboriginal culture.

=== Spanish colonial era ===
Puente de Romblon, one of the historic bridges of Romblon, an Important Cultural Property

The islands were first visited by Spanish conquistador Martin de Goiti in late 1569, and were thereafter organized by the Spanish into encomiendas. The encomienda of Donblon (Romblon (Note: See Romblon in the List of provincial name etymologies of the Philippines article.)), established on April 24, 1571, was granted to Don Gonzalo Riquel. In the first census done by Spanish navigator Miguel de Loarca in 1582, Romblon Island was shown to have 240 residents engaged in wax gathering. At this time, Miguel de Loarca recorded the island's name as "Lomlon" or "Doblon". In the local Visayan dialect, the word means a bird warming an egg in its nest. It was also known as Domblon before the present name was adopted.

In 1631, during the term of Spanish Governor-General Juan Niño de Tabora, Romblon was established as a pueblo, making it one of the two oldest settlements in the province, the other being Banton located in the north of the province. In 1635, the island of Romblon was evangelized by Spanish Recollect fathers and became a dependency of the Captaincy General of the Philippines. Their fortified church is the present cathedral of Romblon. It received its first Spanish missionaries in the 17th century. During the 17th and 18th centuries, it was often ravaged by Moros. Two forts were erected by the Spanish, San Andrés and Santiago.

It was organized into a Comandancia (a province or district under military control) by the Spanish in 1853. During the 1800s census Romblon was recorded to have 1,511 native families and 15 Spanish-Filipino families.

=== Philippine–American War era ===
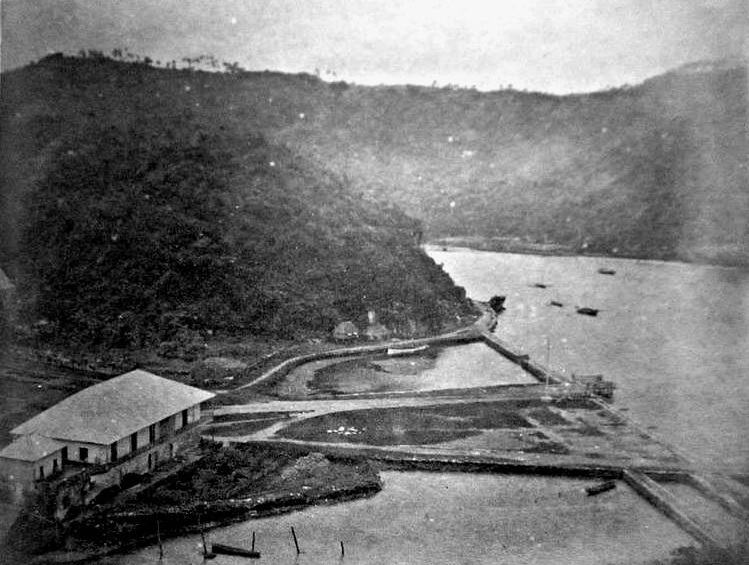
Romblon, Romblon c. early 1900s

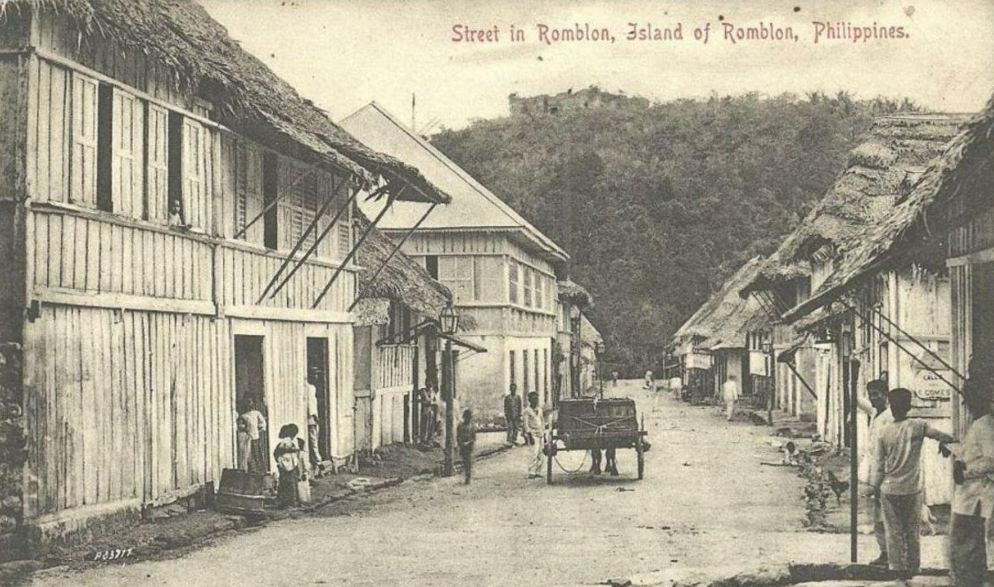
Romblon, Romblon street scene c. 1905

In 1898, at the conclusion of the Spanish–American War, Spain ceded the Philippines to the United States. In 1901, the Americans established a civilian government in Romblon Province. Ten new barrios were created and three existing barrios were abolished. Those impacted included Aglomiom, which was merged with Sablayan due to its small population, Embarcacion, which was reattached to El Pueblo or Poblacion, and the inland barrio of Cogon, which was reorganized and split into the five barrios of Tambac, Ilauran, Macalas, Lamao, and Agbaluto (referred to collectively as TIMLA, from their initial letters), while barrio Alfonso XIII was renamed Calabogo.

The 10 additional barrios were Bagacay, Agbudia, Agtongo, Embarcacion, Maria Cristina (renamed as Sawang) and the five TIMLA barrios. Agtongo was created into a separate barrio in 1916, taken from Cajimos. In 1918, those engaged in the maritime industry were designated separately as a distinct barrio known as Embarcacion, which was annexed again to barrio Poblacion or El Pueblo in 1939. Agbudia was the last barrio to be created after being taken from Guimpingan in 1939. Meanwhile, the two barrios Majabangbaybay and Sogod, located in Tablas island, were returned to Badajoz (now San Agustin), and were abolished as independent barrios and attached as sitios of barrio Guinpuc-an (Carmen) in 1901.

=== Japanese occupation era ===
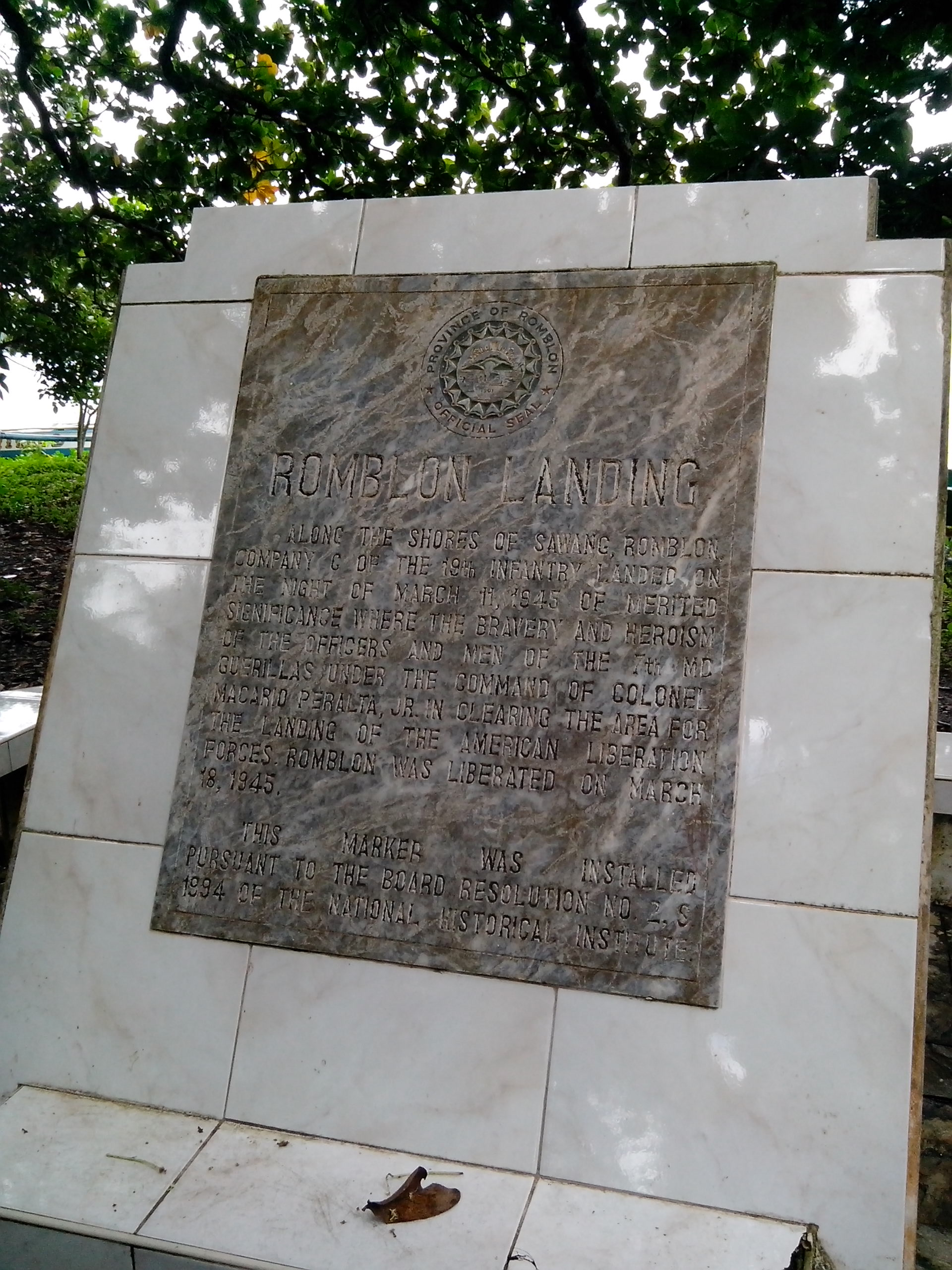
Plaque commemorating the landing of American liberation forces in Sawang, Romblon during World War II

During World War II, Japanese forces occupied the island from 1942 to 1945. An American force landed on the island on March 11, 1945, and liberated it from the occupying Japanese forces. By March 18, the entire province was liberated from the Japanese. A monument located near the beach in Sawang commemorates this.

=== Philippine independence ===
The Republic of the Philippines became an independent sovereign nation on July 4, 1946. The island barrio of Nagoso was renamed Cobrador in 1960 and the urban barangay of Poblacion was split into four separate barangays, named simply as Barangays 1, 2, 3, and 4 in 1975.

=== Corruption ===
On March 25, 2018, the Sandiganbayan, a special appellate collegial court that tries graft and corruption cases, affirmed its ruling sentencing Romblon mayor Mariano Mateo, former mayor Leo Mérida and eight other former local officials to 10 years in prison. The ruling was in connection with the alleged anomalous procurement of a heavy equipment. The case, which was filed in 2010, stemmed from the municipal government's purchase of a backhoe amounting to P13.95 million in November 2005 without public bidding. At the time, Mérida was the mayor and Mateo was a councilor. The court said witnesses testified that the backhoe was not used for the purpose for which it was purchased. The Supreme Court of the Philippines affirmed the conviction and sentence on August 22, 2023.

== Geography ==
Romblon Island
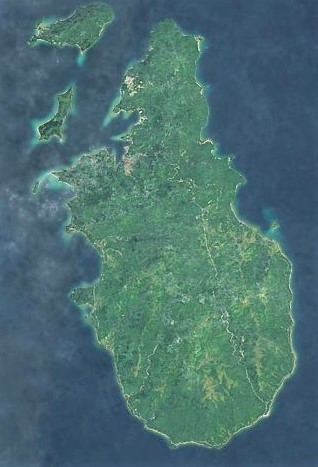
- Romblon island satellite image captured by Sentinel-2 in 2016
- Interactive map of Romblon Island

Geography
- Archipelago: Romblon Group of Islands
- Adjacent to: Sibuyan Sea

Administration
- Philippines
- Region: Mimaropa
- Province: Romblon
- Municipality: Romblon
- Largest settlement: Romblon (pop. 38,758)

Demographics
- Population: 38,758 (2015)

The municipality consists primarily of Romblon Island, as well as the smaller Alad, Cobrador, and Logbon islands, to the northwest, each of which are their own barangays. The municipality proper is situated along the coast of Romblon Bay, a natural harbor and safe haven for ships passing in the area during inclement weather. The highest peak is Mount Lagting in barangay Sablayan with a height of 444 metres (1,457 ft).

=== Barangays ===
Romblon is politically subdivided into 31 barangays. Each barangay consists of puroks and some have sitios.

- Agbaluto
- Agpanabat
- Agbudia
- Agnaga
- Agnay
- Agnipa
- Agtongo
- Alad (island barangay)
- Bagacay
- Cajimos
- Calabogo
- Capaclan
- Ginablan
- Guimpingan
- Ilauran
- Lamao
- Li-o
- Logbon (island barangay)
- Lunas
- Lonos
- Macalas
- Mapula
- Cobrador (Naguso; island barangay)
- Palje
- Barangay I (Poblacion)
- Barangay II (Poblacion)
- Barangay III (Poblacion)
- Barangay IV (Poblacion)
- Sablayan
- Sawang
- Tambac

=== Climate ===
Climate data for Romblon (1991–2020, extremes 1904–2023)
Month	Jan	Feb	Mar	Apr	May	Jun	Jul	Aug	Sep	Oct	Nov	Dec	Year
Record high °C (°F)	35.5 (95.9)	35.1 (95.2)	35.8 (96.4)	37.5 (99.5)	38.2 (100.8)	38.2 (100.8)	37.7 (99.9)	35.7 (96.3)	35.8 (96.4)	35.3 (95.5)	35.2 (95.4)	34.1 (93.4)	38.2 (100.8)
Mean daily maximum °C (°F)	27.6 (81.7)	28.4 (83.1)	29.5 (85.1)	31.3 (88.3)	31.9 (89.4)	31.1 (88.0)	30.1 (86.2)	30.0 (86.0)	30.1 (86.2)	29.7 (85.5)	29.2 (84.6)	28.0 (82.4)	29.7 (85.5)
Daily mean °C (°F)	25.7 (78.3)	26.2 (79.2)	27.0 (80.6)	28.5 (83.3)	29.1 (84.4)	28.4 (83.1)	27.7 (81.9)	27.7 (81.9)	27.7 (81.9)	27.4 (81.3)	27.1 (80.8)	26.2 (79.2)	27.4 (81.3)
Mean daily minimum °C (°F)	23.8 (74.8)	23.9 (75.0)	24.6 (76.3)	25.7 (78.3)	26.3 (79.3)	25.8 (78.4)	25.3 (77.5)	25.4 (77.7)	25.3 (77.5)	25.1 (77.2)	25.1 (77.2)	24.5 (76.1)	25.1 (77.2)
Record low °C (°F)	18.4 (65.1)	17.0 (62.6)	19.7 (67.5)	20.1 (68.2)	15.6 (60.1)	20.6 (69.1)	21.1 (70.0)	21.2 (70.2)	21.0 (69.8)	20.4 (68.7)	20.3 (68.5)	18.5 (65.3)	15.6 (60.1)
Average rainfall mm (inches)	120.9 (4.76)	89.9 (3.54)	85.3 (3.36)	69.7 (2.74)	157.5 (6.20)	242.9 (9.56)	307.3 (12.10)	221.4 (8.72)	244.6 (9.63)	304.9 (12.00)	258.5 (10.18)	275.6 (10.85)	2,378.5 (93.64)
Average rainy days (≥ 1 mm)	12	9	8	6	9	14	17	15	14	17	17	17	155
Average relative humidity (%)	84	83	81	78	78	81	83	83	83	83	84	85	82
Source: PAGASA

Romblon falls under Type III of the Corona climatic classification system which was devised in 1920. It is characterized by no pronounced wet and dry seasons. Generally, the wet season is from June to November and sometimes extends up to December when the southwest monsoon is predominant. The dry season is from January to May but is sometimes interrupted by erratic rainfall. The annual mean temperature is 27 °C (81 °F), with February as the coldest month with temperatures dropping to 20 °C (68 °F), and May as the warmest month with temperatures reaching up to 35 °C (95 °F). Habagat monsoon winds pass through the province from June to October while northeasterly winds or Amihan blows through the islands from December to February.

== Demographics ==
Population census of Romblon

Year	Pop.	±% p.a.
1903	10,095	—
1918	10,467	+0.24%
1939	14,309	+1.50%
1948	12,879	−1.16%
1960	16,708	+2.19%
1970	21,717	+2.65%
1975	22,489	+0.70%
1980	24,251	+1.52%

Year	Pop.	±% p.a.
1990	29,983	+2.14%
1995	34,290	+2.55%
2000	36,612	+1.41%
2007	37,544	+0.35%
2010	37,995	+0.44%
2015	38,758	+0.38%
2020	40,554	+0.96%
2024	39,004	−0.93%

Source: Philippine Statistics Authority

Romblomanons are the indigenous inhabitants of Romblon. They are part of the wider Visayan ethnolinguistic group, who constitute the largest Filipino ethnolinguistic group.

In the 2024 census, there were 39,004 people living in Romblon. Most Romblomanons speak Ini, one of the three languages in the province after Asi and Onhan.

== Economy ==
Poverty incidence of Romblon (%)

Source: Philippine Statistics Authority

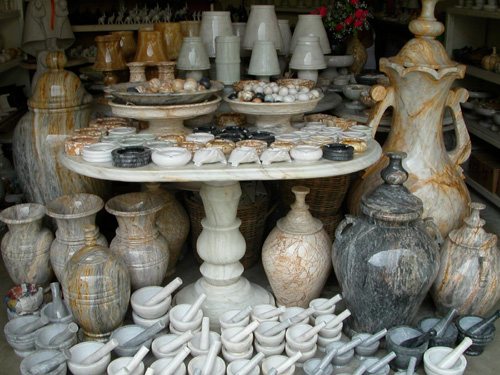
Marble wares from Romblon

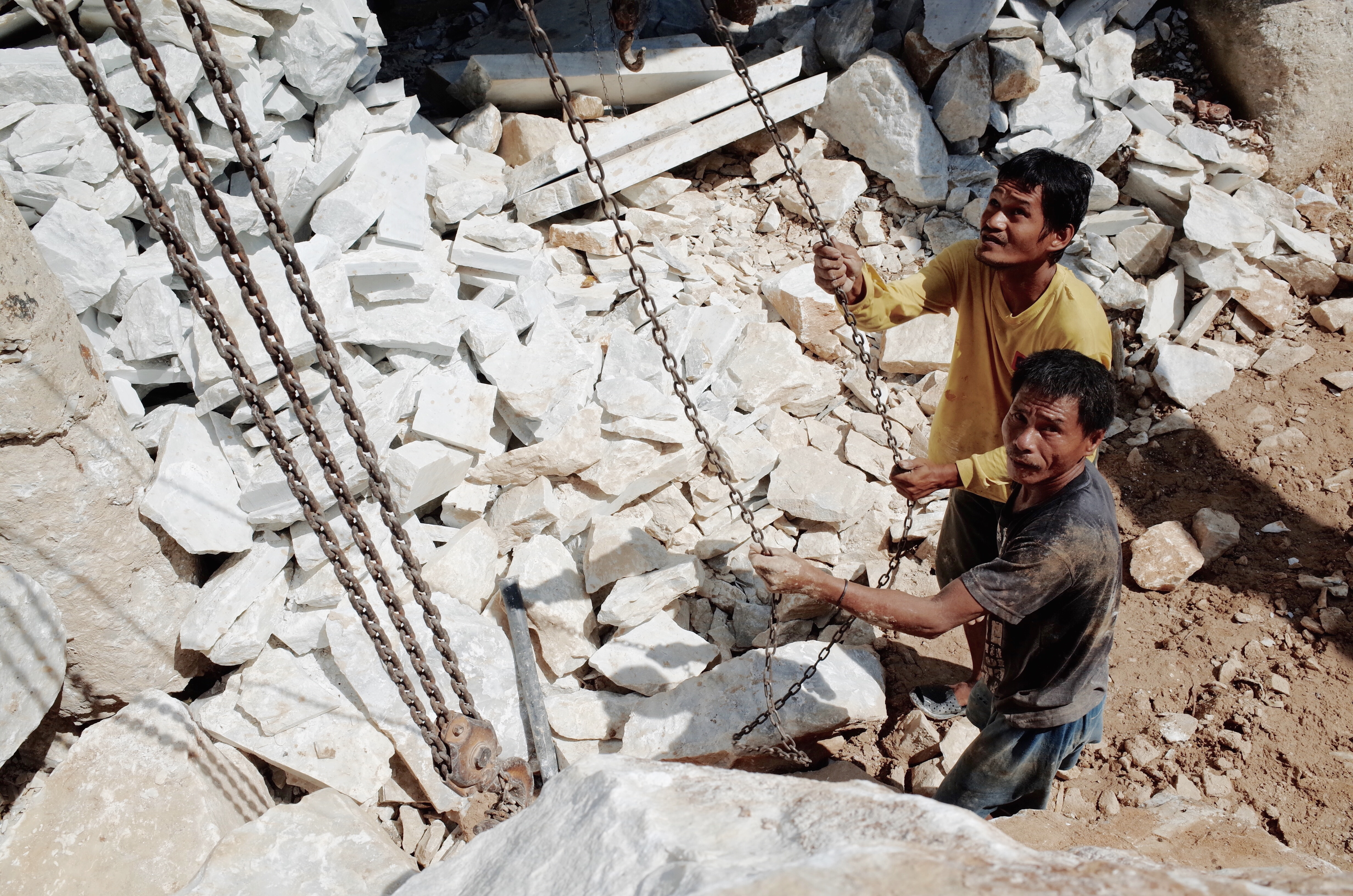
Marble plant workers working in a quarry

Romblon's economy relies much on the local marble industry. Marble is the most significant mineral deposit of Romblon and is the most renowned product of the province. The province is the second biggest provincial marble producer of the country next to Bulacan. Romblon marble is of very high quality and comes in shades of white, green, pink, red and black. The Mines and Geosciences Bureau has estimated that Romblon is endowed with about 150 million metric tons of marble. At current rates of extraction, the supply may last for three more centuries. Tablas Island is also believed to have vast reserves of marble.

Marble quarrying and processing are major activities in Romblon. Among the most common marble products are categorized into the following: novelty items (gifts, ashtray, table bars), furniture (dining tables, baptismal fonts) and construction materials (tiles, balusters, marble chips). Aside from marble quarrying and processing, tourism, fishing and coconut farming are also basic livelihood sources in the island.

== Transportation ==
The Port of Romblon serves the island of Romblon.

== Sports ==
The Romblon National High School hosts the first and only artificial football pitch in Mimaropa in 2024.

== Tourism ==
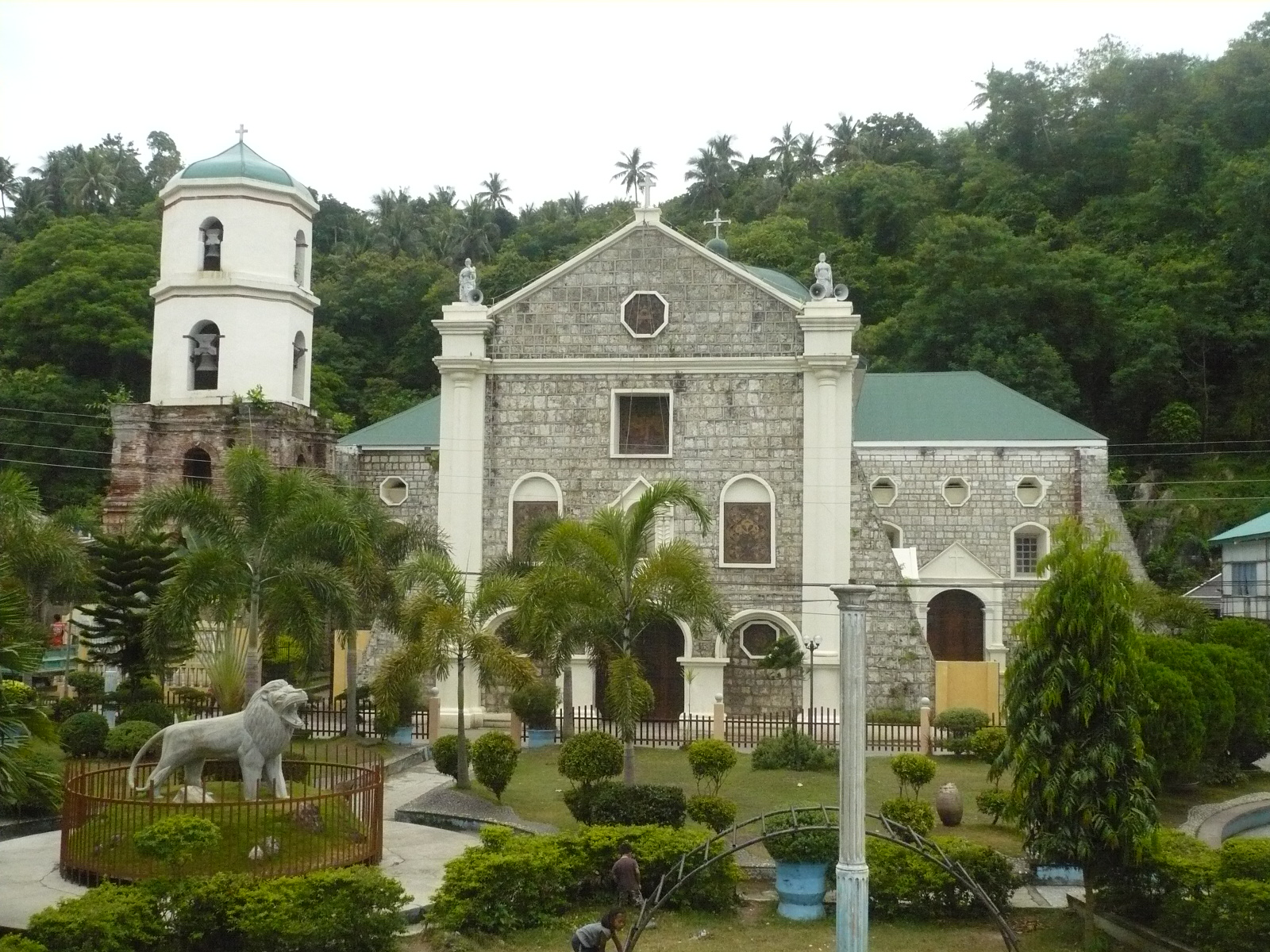
Romblon Cathedral, a National Cultural Treasure

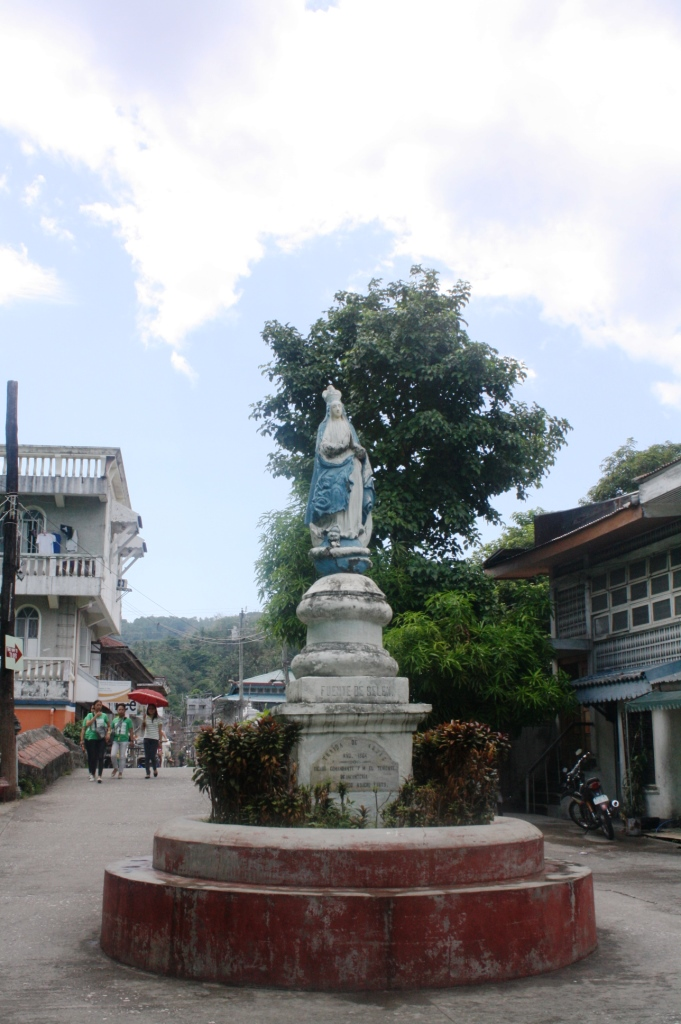
Fuente de Belen fountain

The capital town of Romblon has a number of tourist places, which include:

- St. Joseph's Cathedral and Belfry: This is one of the oldest Roman Catholic Churches in the Philippines. It was constructed for the Recollect Fathers between 1640 and 1726 by talented local artisans using coral blocks and bricks.
- Fuente de Belen: Located across from the municipal hall, this water fountain was erected in 1864 by Eduardo Asuero as the source of fresh water for Romblon during the Spanish colonial period. Atop the fountain is an image of the Blessed Virgin Mary.
- Old Municipal Building: Built out of coral limestone during the Spanish colonial era, it housed the cuartel or headquarters of the local Guardia Civil. Retaining the old architecture of the building, the municipal hall is still used to house government offices and the municipal jail.
- Bishop's Palace or Villa del Mar: Located in barangay Lonos, it serves as the official residence of the Bishop of Romblon. It was constructed out of clay bricks by the first bishop of Romblon, Msgr. Nicolas Mondejar.
- Forts San Andres and Santiago: Twin Spanish forts constructed out of coral blocks and bricks between 1644 and 1573, which overlook the whole town and harbor at 156 feet above sea level. These served as a bastion to protect the people against Muslim raiders and Dutch pirates.
- Bonbon Beach: Located five kilometers away from town proper this shoreline in Barangay Lonos is covered with fine white sand and features a gradually sloping ocean floor free of sea grass and sharp stones.
- Simbahan Cave: Located in barangay Cobrador, it is the largest natural cave in the islands and believed to be an ancient burial ground as manifested by pottery and ancient works of arts found inside.
- Cobrador Beach: This beach is located in the eastern side of the islet and has fine white sand and crushed corals.
- Romblon Harbor: It has offered shelter for sea vessels since Spanish colonial period. Lying off the bay is a sunken galleon and the wreck of a Japanese battleship.
- Buena Suerte Resort: A nature resort with a swimming pool located in Barangay Tambac.
- Marble quarries and factories: Romblon's marble comes in a spectrum of shades ranging from white to black with a gamut of in-between tints like mottled white, tiger white, onyx and jade.

== Government ==
Old municipal building

=== Local government ===
Barangay Capaclan in the municipality hosts the Romblon Provincial Capitol Complex, where the governor, the vice governor, and the Sangguniang Panlalawigan hold office. The municipal government is seated in Barangay II.

Pursuant to Chapter II, Title II, Book III of Republic Act 7160, the Local Government Code of 1991, the municipal government is composed of a mayor (alkalde), a vice mayor (bise alkalde) and members (kagawad) of the legislative branch Sangguniang Bayan alongside a secretary to the said legislature, all of which are elected to a three-year term and are eligible to run for three consecutive terms. The incumbent mayor is Gerard Montojo and the vice mayor is Mariano "Anoy" Mateo.

Barangays are also headed by elected officials: Barangay Captain, Barangay Council, whose members are called Barangay Councilors. The barangays have SK federation which represents the barangay, headed by SK chairperson and whose members are called SK councilors. All officials are also elected every three years.

=== Elected officials ===
Term	Mayor	Vice Mayor
June 30, 2007 - June 30, 2010	Gerard "Gard" Montojo y Sy (NP)	Melben Mesana y Montojo (CMD), (KAMPI)
June 30, 2010 - June 30, 2013	Gerard "Gard" Montojo y Sy (NP)	Melben Mesana y Montojo (CMD), (KAMPI)
June 30, 2013 - June 30, 2016	Gerard "Gard" Montojo y Sy (NP)	Mariano "Anoy" Mateo
June 30, 2016 - June 30, 2019	Mariano "Anoy" Mateo y Mallorca (PDPLBN)	Mart Arthur "Mac-Mac" L. Silverio
June 30, 2019 - June 30, 2022	Gerard "Gard" Montojo y Sy (NP)	Mariano "Anoy" Mateo y Mallorca
June 30, 2022 - 30 June 2025	Gerard "Gard" Montojo y Sy (NP)	Mariano "Anoy" Mateo y Mallorca
June 30, 2025 - incumbent	Gerard "Gard" Montojo y Sy (NP)	Mariano "Anoy" Mateo y Mallorca

Municipal Council
2025 - 2028
Mart Arthur “Macmac” Silverio
Lyndon Molino
Ronald “Mac” Riano
Orlando "Orly" Magano
Hannah Fontilar
Miguel "Migz" Montojo
Fernando "Cabo" Faigao III
Joseph Mingoa
Fernando “Fern” Faigao Jr. (ABC Mun. President)
Audrey Shane Mariño (SK Mun. Federation President)

^{a} Died in office.
^{b} Served in acting capacity.
^{c} Resigned.

=== Congress representation ===
Romblon, as a municipality and provincial capital, belongs to the lone district of the province of Romblon. Currently, the town is represented by Rep. Eleandro Jesus F. Madrona in the house of representatives.

== Education ==
The Romblon Schools District Office governs all educational institutions within the municipality. It oversees the management and operations of all private and public, from primary to secondary schools.

=== Primary and elementary schools ===
- Agbaluto Elementary School
- Agnaga Elementary School
- Agnay Elementary School
- Agnipa Elementary School
- Agpanabat Elementary School
- Agtongo Elementary School
- Alad Lamao Elementary School
- Alad Recudo Elementary School
- Bagacay Elementary School
- Cajimos Elementary School
- Calabogo Elementary School
- Cobrador Elementary School
- Cogon Elementary School
- Ginablan Elementary School
- Guimpingan Elementary School
- Ilauran Elementary School
- Lamao Elementary School
- Li-O Elementary School
- Logbon Elementary School
- Lonos Elementary School
- Lunas Elementary School
- Maximino Mazo Motin Elementary School
- Montfort Academy
- Palje Primary School
- Romblon East Central School
- Romblon West Central School
- Sablayan Elementary School
- San Jose Elementary School
- Sawang Elementary School
- Timla Elementary School

=== Secondary schools ===
- Alad National High School
- Agnipa National High School
- Macario Molina National High School
- Romblon National High School
