= San Salvador, Valladolid =

San Salvador
- Municipality
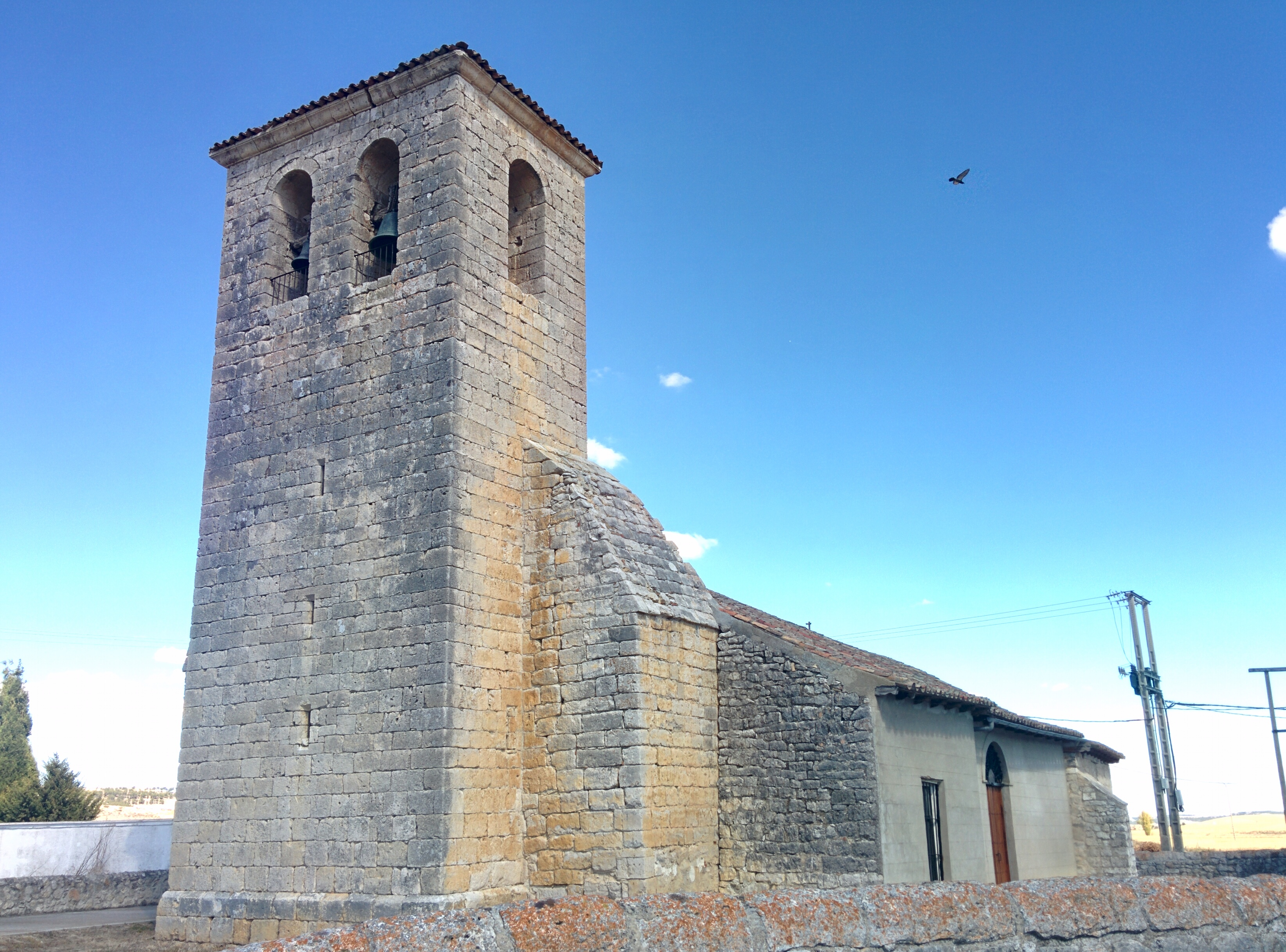
- Church of the Santísimo Salvador

- Location in Spain
- Coordinates: 41°37′15″N 5°5′17″W
- Country: Spain
- Community: Castile and León
- Province: Valladolid

Area
  - Total: 10.47 km^{2} (4.04 sq mi)

Population (2025-01-01)
  - Total: 20
  - Density: 1.9/km^{2} (4.9/sq mi)
- Time zone: UTC+1 (CET)
  - Summer (DST): UTC+2 (CEST)

San Salvador is a municipality located in the province of Valladolid, Castile and León, Spain. According to the 2025 census (INE), the municipality had a population of 20 inhabitants.

== Demography ==
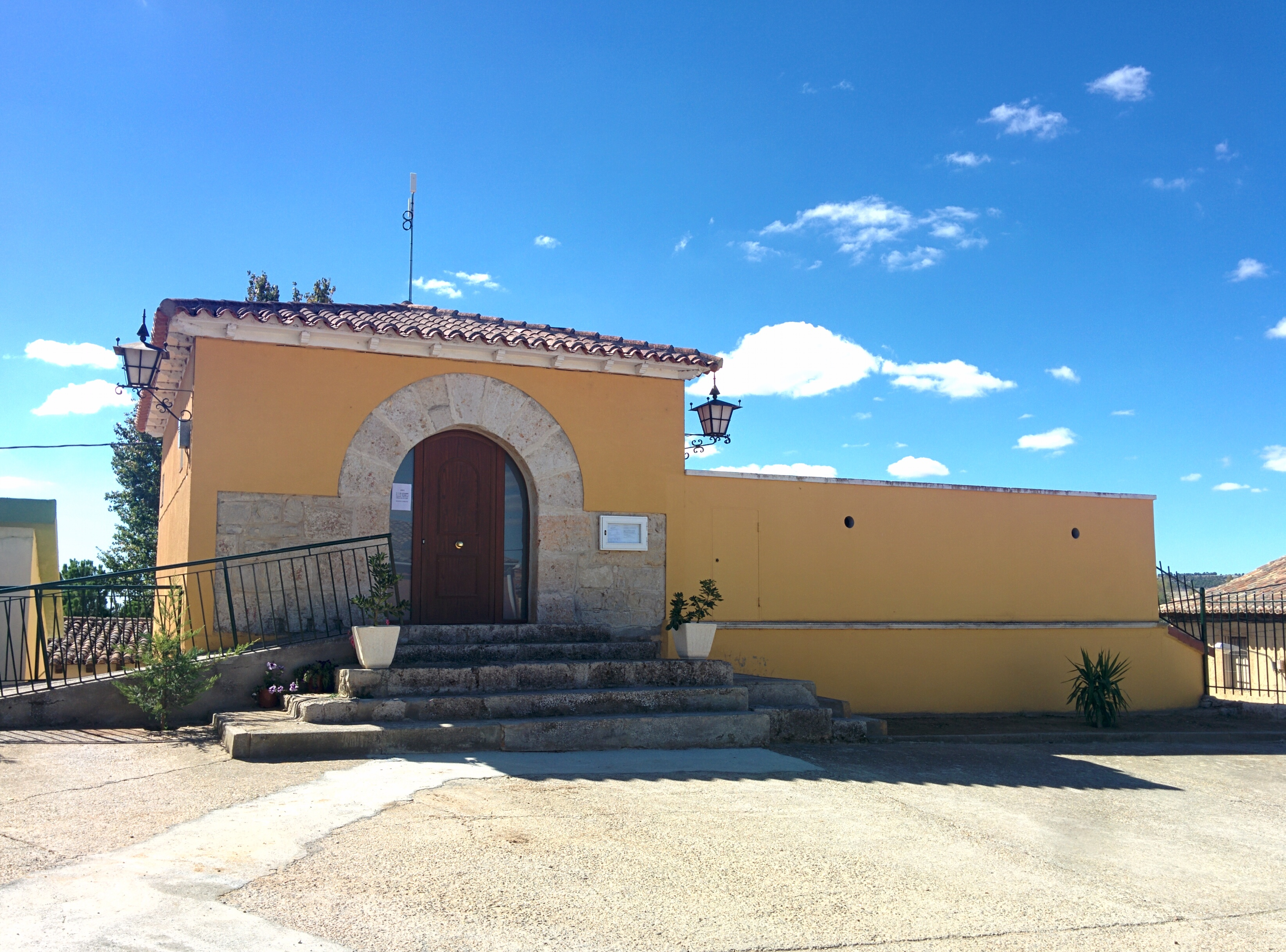
City hall of San Salvador

According to the 2025 census (INE), the municipality had a population of 20 inhabitants.
