= Salvador del Mundo (chemist) =

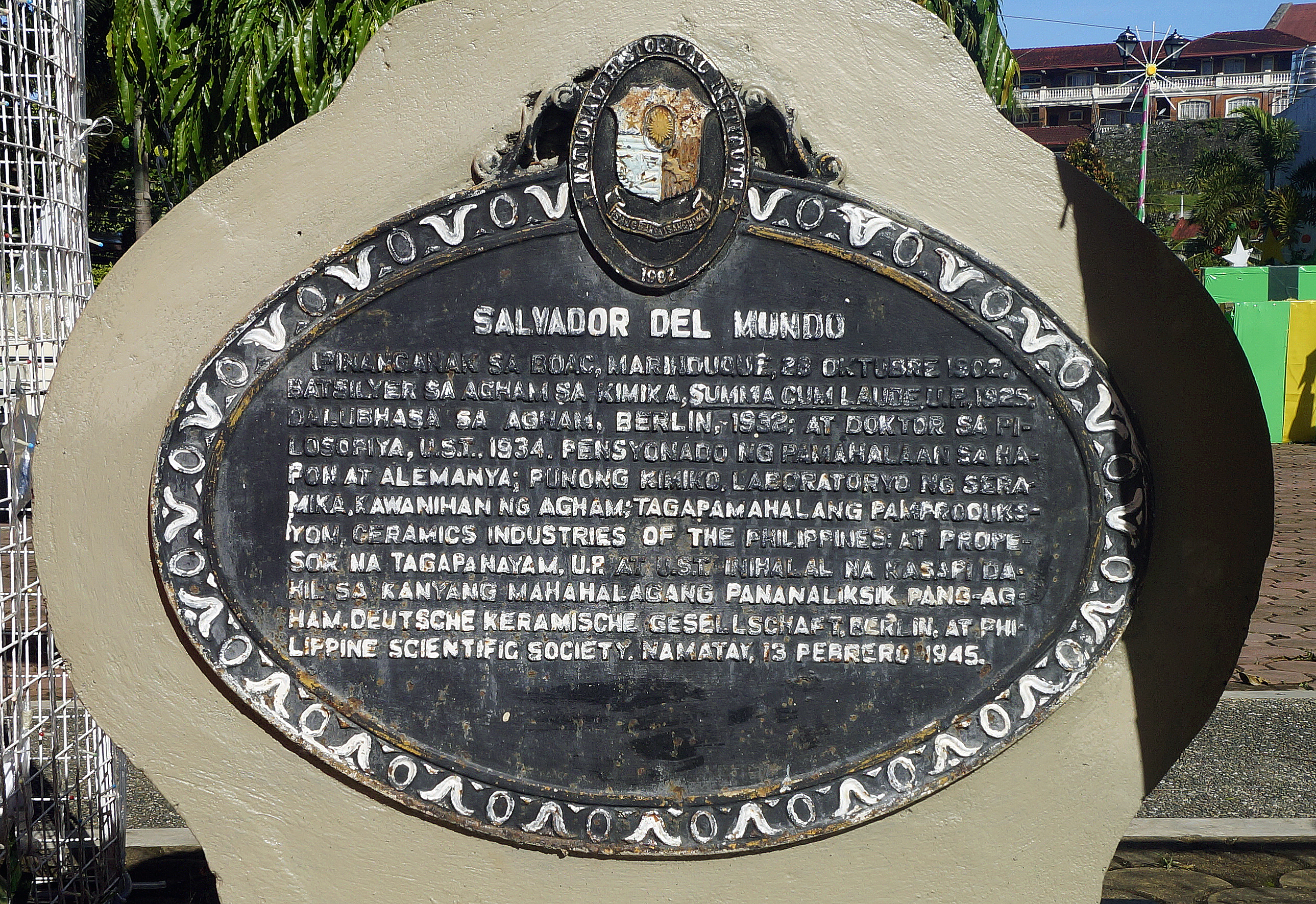
- National historical marker at the Boac Municipal Hall
- Born: October 28, 1902; Boac, Marinduque, Philippine Islands
- Died: February 13, 1945 (aged 42)
- Education: University of Santo Tomas
- Scientific career
- Fields: Chemistry
- Workplaces: Workplaces: Bureau of Science; Ceramics Industries of the Philippines; University of the Philippines; University of Santo Tomas; Society memberships: German Ceramics Society; Philippine Scientific Society

Salvador del Mundo (28 October 1902 – 13 February 1945) was a Filipino chemist specializing in ceramics. Born in Boac, Marinduque, del Mundo graduated, summa cum laude, with a degree in chemistry from the University of the Philippines in 1925, and obtained a doctorate degree from the University of Santo Tomas in 1934. His scientific career led him to become the lead chemist of the ceramics laboratory of the government Bureau of Science, which is now the Department of Science and Technology, production manager of the Ceramics Industries of the Philippines, and professorships at the University of the Philippines and the University of Santo Tomas. Del Mundo also became a member of the German Ceramics Society and the Philippine Scientific Society.
