= Fort Culion =

Citadel in Palawan, Philippines

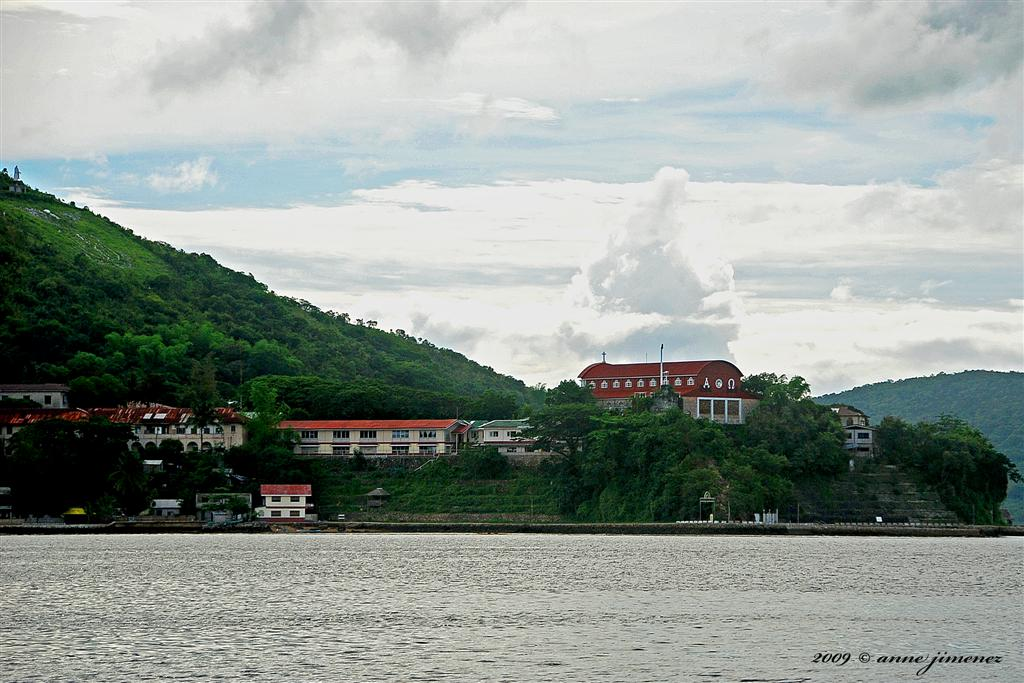
- The fort ruins in their natural setting, with the Immaculate Conception Church (the red building)

General information
- Location: Culion, Palawan, Philippines
- Coordinates: 11°53′32.521″N 120°1′27.869″E
- Completed: 1740

Design and construction
- Designations: National Historical Landmark

Fort Culion is a citadel built in 1740 during the Spanish-era in the Philippines. The Recollect Augustinians constructed the fort to defend themselves from Muslim invaders. The structure was built of stone, square-shaped, and with four bastions.

In 1930, the Jesuits used the coral stones used on the fort to build the walls of the Immaculate Conception Parish Church, also known as Culion Church. The fort, now in ruins, currently serves as a lighthouse. Its canons are still visible

The National Historical Commission of the Philippines declared the fort as a historical landmark in 1939.

== Gallery ==
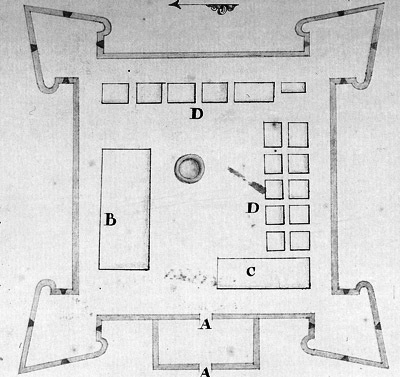
Fort plan

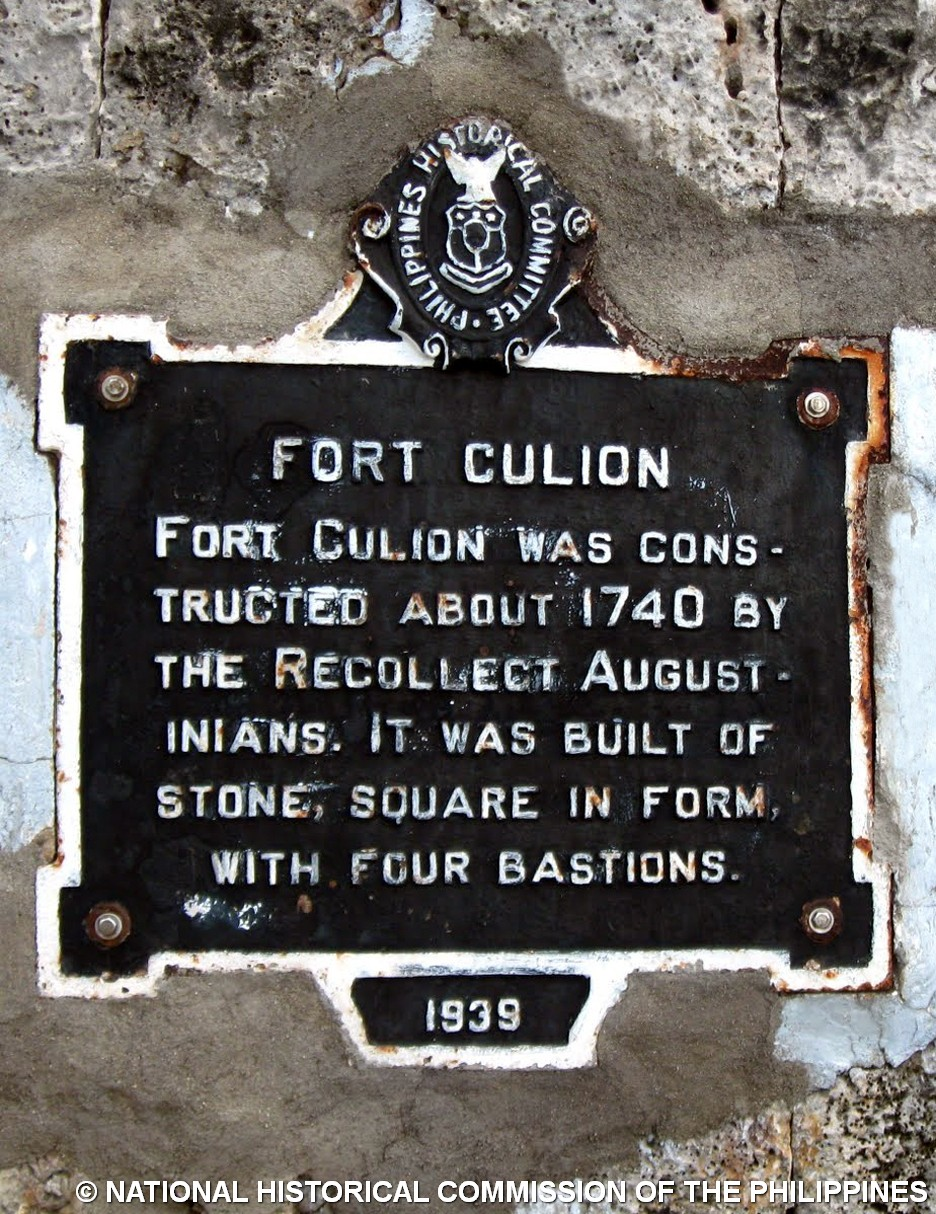
National Historical Commission of the Philippines historical marker
