= Marinduque Provincial Board =

Legislative body of the province of Marinduque, Philippines

Marinduque Provincial Board Sangguniang Panlalawigan ng Marinduque

Type
- Type: Unicameral
- Term limits: 3 terms (9 years)

Leadership
- Presiding Officer: Romulo Bacorro, Jr., Independent since June 30, 2025

Structure
- Seats: 13 board members 1 ex officio presiding officer
- Political groups: PFP (6) Lakas (1) Independent (3) Nonpartisan (2) Vacancy (1)
- Length of term: 3 years
- Authority: Local Government Code of the Philippines

Elections
- Voting system: Multiple non-transferable vote (regular members); Indirect election (ex officio members)
- Last election: May 12, 2025
- Next election: May 8, 2028

Meeting place
- Marinduque Provincial Capitol, Boac

The Marinduque Provincial Board is the Sangguniang Panlalawigan (provincial legislature) of the Philippine province of Marinduque.

The members are elected via plurality-at-large voting: the province is divided into two districts, each having five seats. A voter votes up to five names, with the top five candidates per district being elected. The vice governor is the ex officio presiding officer, and only votes to break ties. The vice governor is elected via the plurality voting system province-wide.

Aside from the regular members, the board also includes the provincial federation presidents of the Liga ng mga Barangay (ABC, from its old name "Association of Barangay Captains"), the Sangguniang Kabataan (SK, youth councils) and the Philippine Councilors League (PCL) as ex officio members. They join the board once they are elected as president of their respective league or federation shortly after the start of their terms following the regular local elections (in the case of PCL) or the barangay and SK elections (in the case of ABC and SK).

== District apportionment ==
The districts used in appropriation of members is not coextensive with the legislative district of Marinduque. Unlike congressional representation which is at-large, Marinduque is divided into two districts for representation in the Sangguniang Panlalawigan, with the western half of the province (Mogpog, Boac and Gasan) constituting the body's first district, and the eastern half (Santa Cruz, Torrijos and Buenavista) forming the second district.

In 2025, both districts gained 1 additional seat each after the Department of Finance upgraded the province's income classification to 2nd class, from 4th class.

Elections	Seats per district		Ex officio seats	Total seats
Elections	1st	2nd	Ex officio seats	Total seats
1992–2025	4	4	3	11
2025–present	5	5	3	13

== List of members ==
=== Current members ===
These are the members after the 2023 barangay and SK elections and the 2025 local elections.

The names of regular members are listed in order of their rank in the local election in their respective district.

- Vice Governor: Romulo Bacorro Jr. (Independent)

Seat	Board member	Party	Term number	Start of term	End of term
1st district	Mark Julius Caballes	PFP	2	June 30, 2022	June 30, 2028
1st district	Antonio Mangcucang III	PFP	2	June 30, 2022	June 30, 2028
1st district	Gilbert Daquioag	Independent	1	June 30, 2025	June 30, 2028
1st district	Aurelio Leva III	PFP	2	June 30, 2022	June 30, 2028
1st district	John Pelaez	Independent	1	June 30, 2025	June 30, 2028
2nd district	Joam Morales	Lakas	1	June 30, 2025	June 30, 2028
2nd district	Danilo Red	PFP	2	June 30, 2022	June 30, 2028
2nd district	Mercedes Rejano	PFP	3	June 30, 2019	June 30, 2028
2nd district	Primo Cruzado Pamintuan	Independent	1	June 30, 2025	June 30, 2028
2nd district	Ishmael Lim	PFP	3	June 30, 2019	June 30, 2028
ABC	Carlos de Peralta	Nonpartisan	1	January 29, 2024	January 1, 2026
PCL	Vacant (Note: Vacant pending the election of a new set of officers of the province's Philippine Councilors League.)				
SK	Bertinus Valencia	Nonpartisan	1	December 1, 2023	January 1, 2026

=== Vice governor ===
Election year	Name	Party
1992	Rosa Lecaroz	NPC
1995	Teodorito Rejano	Lakas-NUCD
1998	Teodorito Rejano	Lakas-NUCD
2001	Teodorito Rejano	Independent
2004	Leandro Palma	Lakas
2007	Tomas Pizarro	Independent
2010	Antonio Uy Jr.	Liberal
2013	Romulo Bacorro Jr.	Liberal
2016	Romulo Bacorro Jr.	Liberal
2019	Romulo Bacorro Jr.	PDP–Laban
2022	Adeline Marciano-Angeles	PDP–Laban
2025	Romulo Bacorro Jr.	Independent

=== 1st district ===
- Municipalities: Boac, Gasan, Mogpog
- Population (2020): 127,996

Election year	Member (party)	Member (party)	Member (party)	Member (party)	Member (party)
1992	Rodrigo Sotto (LDP)	Bonifacio de Luna (Independent)	Romeo Muhi (LDP)	Rosario Jugo (LDP)	—N/a
1995	Rodrigo Sotto (Lakas–NUCD)	Pedrito Nepomuceno (Independent)	Leticia Monte (Independent)	Zenaida Daquioag (Lakas–NUCD)	—N/a
1998	Adeline Marciano-Angeles (Independent)	Pedrito Nepomuceno (Independent)	Rosemarie Opis-Malasig (Lakas–NUCD)	Zenaida Daquioag (Independent)	—N/a
2001	Adeline Marciano-Angeles (Independent)	Pedrito Nepomuceno (Lakas–NUCD)	Rodrigo Sotto (Independent)	Zenaida Daquioag (Lakas–NUCD)	—N/a
2004	Melecio Go (Independent)	Allan Nepomuceno (Independent)	Leticia Monte (Independent)	Jaime Jasper Lim (Independent)	—N/a
2007	Jose Alvarez (Independent)	Allan Nepomuceno (Kampi)	Leticia Monte (Kampi)	Jaime Jasper Lim (ABC)	—N/a
2010	Melecio Go (Independent)	Allan Nepomuceno (LP)	Mark Anthony Seño (LP)	George Aliño II (Independent)	—N/a
2013	Adeline Marciano-Angeles (NUP)	Theresa Caballes (LP)	Mark Anthony Seño (LP)	George Aliño II (Independent)	—N/a
2016	John Pelaez (Independent)	Theresa Caballes (LP)	Mark Anthony Seño (LP)	Gilbert Daquioag (Independent)	—N/a
2019	Adeline Marciano-Angeles (PDP–Laban)	John Pelaez (PDP–Laban)	Theresa Caballes (UNA)	Gilbert Daquioag (PDP–Laban)	—N/a
2022	Aurelio Leva III (PDP–Laban)	Antonio Mangcucang III (PDP–Laban)	Mark Julius Caballes (PDP–Laban)	Bernadine Opis-Mercado (PDP–Laban)	—N/a
2025	Aurelio Leva III (PFP)	Antonio Mangcucang III (PFP)	Mark Julius Caballes (PFP)	Gilbert Daquioag (Independent)	John Pelaez (Independent)

=== 2nd district ===
- Municipalities: Buenavista, Santa Cruz, Torrijos
- Population (2020): 111,211

Election year	Member (party)	Member (party)	Member (party)	Member (party)	Member (party)
1992	Teodorito Rejano (LDP)	Cesaria Zoleta (LDP)	Norma Ricohermoso (Independent)	Juan Maximo Lim (LDP)	—N/a
1995	Ildefonso de los Santos (Lakas–NUCD)	Cesaria Zoleta (Lakas–NUCD)	Norma Ricohermoso (Independent)	Juan Maximo Lim (Independent)	—N/a
1998	Ildefonso de los Santos (Lakas–NUCD)	Leandro Palma (Lakas–NUCD)	Norma Ricohermoso (Lakas–NUCD)	Alfonso Rey (Lakas–NUCD)	—N/a
2001	Ildefonso de los Santos (Independent)	Leandro Palma (Lakas–NUCD)	Epifania Rosas (PDP–Laban)	Alfonso Rey (Independent)	—N/a
2004	Eleuterio Raza Jr. (Lakas)	Norma Ricohermoso (Lakas)	Epifania Rosas (Independent)	Alfonso Rey (Lakas)	—N/a
2007	Eleuterio Raza Jr. (Lakas)	Cesaria Zoleta (Lakas)	Ildefonso de los Santos (Lakas)	Yolando Querubin (Lakas)	—N/a
2010	Eleuterio Raza Jr. (LP)	Amelia Aguirre (Lakas-Kampi)	Epifania Rosas (LP)	Harold Red (LP)	—N/a
2013	Juan Fernandez Jr. (LP)	Amelia Aguirre (NUP)	Norma Ricohermoso (LP)	Harold Red (LP)	—N/a
2016	Juan Fernandez Jr. (LP)	Amelia Aguirre (UNA)	Reynaldo Salvacion (Independent)	Harold Red (LP)	—N/a
2019	Juan Fernandez Jr. (Independent)	Melgabal Encabo (PDP–Laban)	Mercedes Rejano (PDP–Laban)	Ishmael Lim (PDP–Laban)	—N/a
2022	Danilo Red (Independent)	Melgabal Encabo (PDP–Laban)	Mercedes Rejano (PDP–Laban)	Ishmael Lim (PDP–Laban)	—N/a
2025	Danilo Red (PFP)	Joam Morales (Lakas)	Mercedes Rejano (PFP)	Ishmael Lim (PFP)	Primo Cruzado Pamintuan (Independent)

=== Liga ng mga Barangay member ===
Election year	ABC/LB President	Barangay Captain of
2018	James Marty Lim (until 2022)	Bgy. II, Gasan
2018	Baldomero Limpiada	Bgy. Balanacan, Mogpog
2023*	Carlos de Peralta	Bgy. Cagpo, Torrijos

*Took office in 2024

=== Philippine Councilors League member ===
Election year	PCL President	Councilor in
2019	Aurelio Leva III (PDP–Laban)	Boac
2022	Jose Neryl Manggol (PDP–Laban)	Mogpog
2025	(TBD)	

=== Sangguniang Kabataan member ===
Election year	SK President	SK Chairperson of
2018	Lauren Rosales	Bgy. Bagong Silang, Santa Cruz
2023	Bertinus Valencia	Bgy. Poblacion, Torrijos
