= 2022 Marinduque local elections =

Local elections in the Philippines

2022 Marinduque gubernatorial election
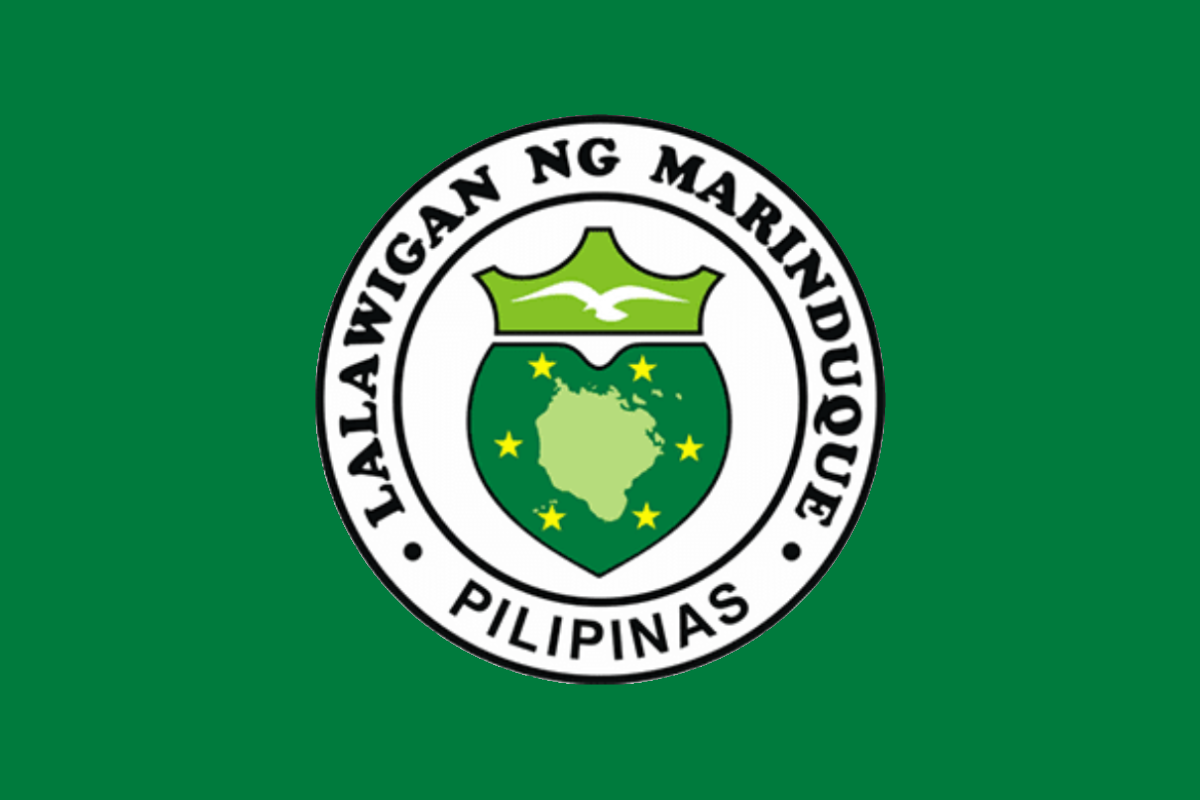
- May 9, 2022
- Registered: 161,538 ▲5.55%
- Turnout: 87.08% (▲8.67 pp)
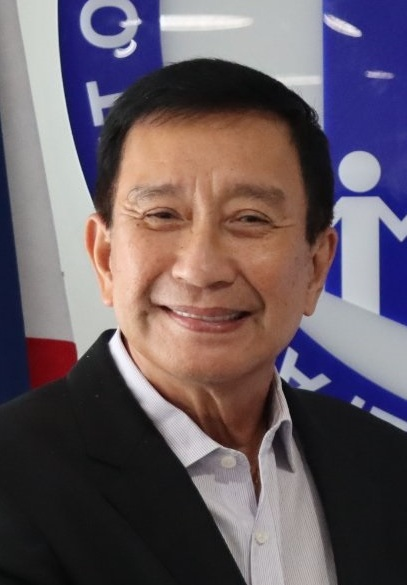

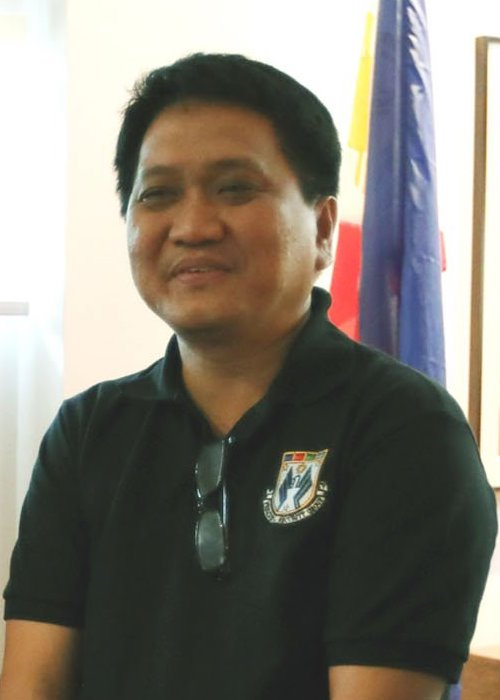

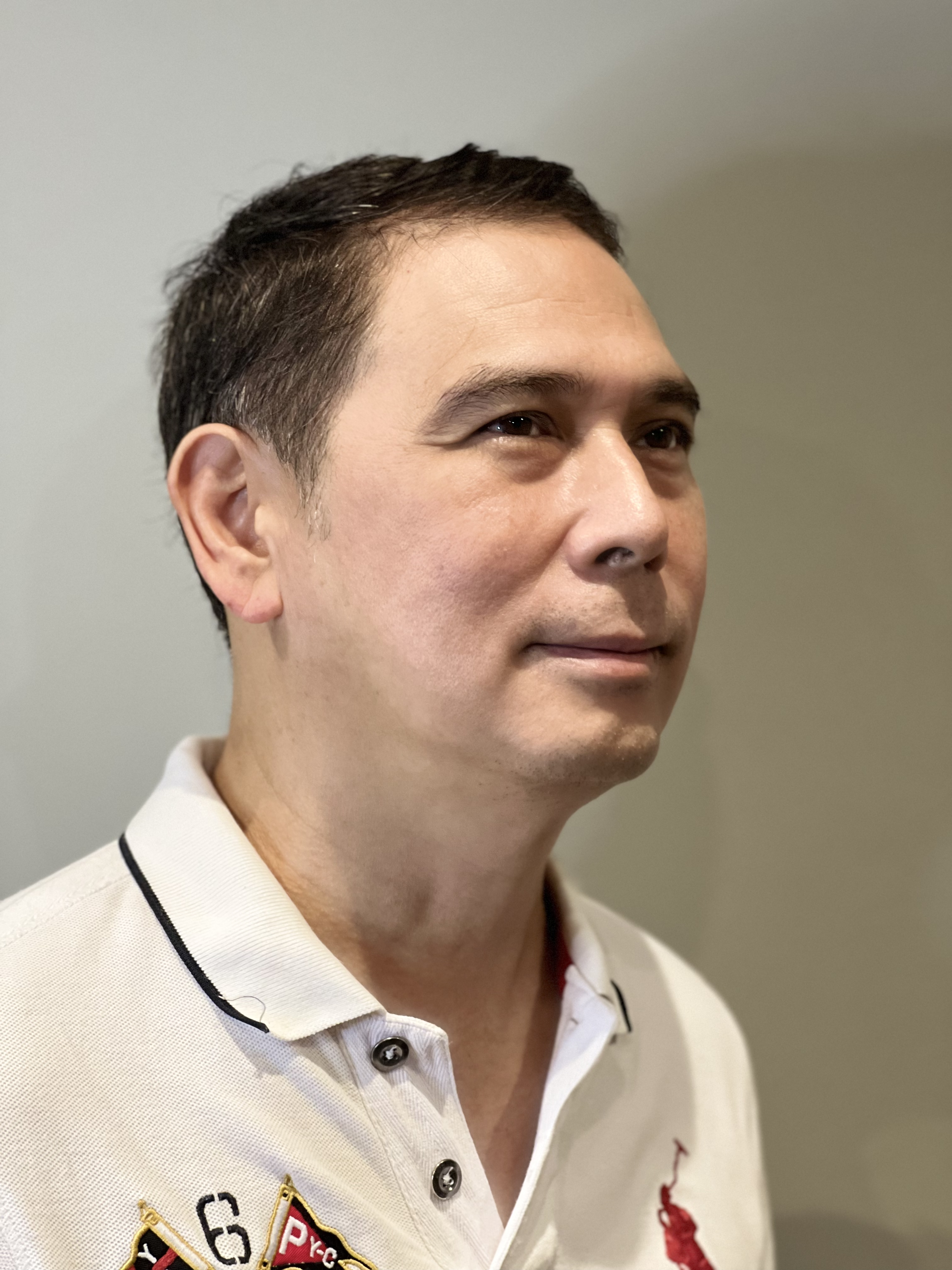
Candidate	Presbitero Velasco Jr.	Romulo Bacorro	James Marty Lim
Party	PDP–Laban	Aksyon	ABC
Running mate	Adeline Angeles	John R. Pelaez	Reynaldo Salvacion
Popular vote	61,848	39,036	27,655
Percentage	48.12	30.37	21.51
Governor before election
Presbitero Velasco Jr.
PDP–Laban
Elected Governor
Presbitero Velasco Jr.
PDP–Laban

Philippine House of Representatives election in Marinduque
- May 9, 2022
Candidate	Lord Allan Velasco
Party	PDP–Laban
Popular vote	98,688
Percentage	100.00
Congressman before election
Lord Allan Velasco
PDP–Laban
Elected Congressman
Lord Allan Velasco
PDP–Laban

Local elections were held in Marinduque on May 9, 2022, as part of the 2022 Philippine general election. Voters selected candidates for all local positions: a town mayor, vice mayor and town councilors, as well as members of the Sangguniang Panlalawigan, a vice-governor, a governor and a representative for the province's at-large congressional district in the House of Representatives.

The local office of the Commission on Elections (COMELEC) in the province confirmed that as of September 29, 2021, some 159,000 eligible voters throughout Marinduque were registered to vote for this election. While this number is lower than in previous provincial elections, the COMELEC expected the number of registered voters to increase with the extension of voter registration brought about by the impact of the COVID-19 pandemic in the Philippines.

== Provincial elections ==
On October 9, 2021, the COMELEC released its final list of candidates running for provincial office, with 29 candidates vying for 11 posts.

=== Governor ===
Incumbent governor Presbitero Velasco Jr. was eligible to run for a second term in office, and ran for re-election. His vice governor, Romulo Bacorro, joined Aksyon Demokratiko on September 23, 2021, in the process leaving PDP–Laban, and sought the governorship against Velasco.

On October 3, 2021, James Marty Lim, barangay captain of Barangay Dos in Gasan and national chairman emeritus of the League of Barangays in the Philippines, announced on Facebook that he would run for governor. Lim last sought a province-wide post in 2007, when he ran for congressman against Carmencita Reyes, while his mother, Gasan mayor Victoria L. Lim, also unsuccessfully sought the governorship against Reyes in the 2016 election. Lim filed his certificate of candidacy on October 5, 2021, and ran under his Alliance for Barangay Concerns party list.

Marinduque gubernatorial election
Party	Candidate	Votes	%
PDP–Laban	Presbitero Velasco Jr.	61,848	48.12
Aksyon	Romulo Bacorro	39,036	30.37
ABC	James Marty Lim	27,655	21.51
Total votes		128,539	100.00
PDP–Laban hold			

==== Per Municipality ====
City/Municipality	Presbitero Velasco Jr.		Romulo Bacorro		James Marty Lim	
City/Municipality	Votes	%	Votes	%	Votes	%
Boac	14,831	50.79	9,724	33.30	4,645	15.91
Buenavista	5,238	41.85	3,587	28.66	3,691	29.49
Gasan	7,854	39.47	3,175	15.96	8,870	44.58
Mogpog	9,852	52.70	5,664	30.30	3,178	17.00
Santa Cruz	15,123	47.32	11,949	37.39	4,884	15.28
Torrijos	8,950	55.00	4,937	30.34	2,387	14.67
TOTAL	61,848	48.12	39,036	30.37	27,655	21.51

=== Vice Governor ===
Romulo Bacorro, the incumbent vice governor, was eligible to run for another term but instead sought the governorship. His running mate was John R. Pelaez, a member of the Marinduque Provincial Board who, along with Bacorro and fellow Provincial Board member Gilbert Daquioag, joined Aksyon on September 23, 2021.

On October 1, 2021, Teodolfo "Tito" Rejano, brother of former Vice Governor Teodoro "Teody" Rejano, filed his certificate of candidacy for the vice governorship as an independent, becoming the first candidate in Marinduque to formally file their candidacy with the COMELEC. Five days later on October 6, former Provincial Board member Reynaldo Salvacion, who ran for governor in the 2019 election, filed his certificate of candidacy for the post, running in the election as the running mate of James Marty Lim. Meanwhile, in the final list of candidates running for provincial-level positions released by the COMELEC, Provincial Board member Adeline Angeles was announced as the running mate of Presbitero Velasco Jr.

Marinduque vice gubernatorial election
Party	Candidate	Votes	%
PDP–Laban	Adeline Angeles	41,178	34.47
ABC	Reynaldo Salvacion	34,111	28.55
Independent	Teodolfo Rejano	27,633	23.13
Aksyon	John R. Pelaez	16,549	13.85
Total votes		119,471	100.00
PDP–Laban gain from Aksyon			

==== Per Municipality ====
Municipality	Adeline Angeles		Reynaldo Salvacion		Teodolfo Rejano		John R. Pelaez	
Municipality	Votes	%	Votes	%	Votes	%	Votes	%
Boac	11,149	40.42	8,309	30.12	3,301	11.97	4,823	17.49
Buenavista	2,961	25.49	6,266	53.94	841	7.24	1,548	13.33
Gasan	7,225	39.28	7,019	38.16	1,355	7.37	2,793	15.19
Mogpog	8,472	47.96	4,330	24.51	2,491	14.10	2,371	13.42
Santa Cruz	6,160	20.94	3,784	12.86	16,635	56.54	2,841	9.66
Torrijos	5,211	35.22	4,403	29.76	3,010	20.34	2,173	14.73
TOTAL	41,178	34.47	34,111	28.55	27,633	23.13	16,549	13.85

=== Provincial Board ===
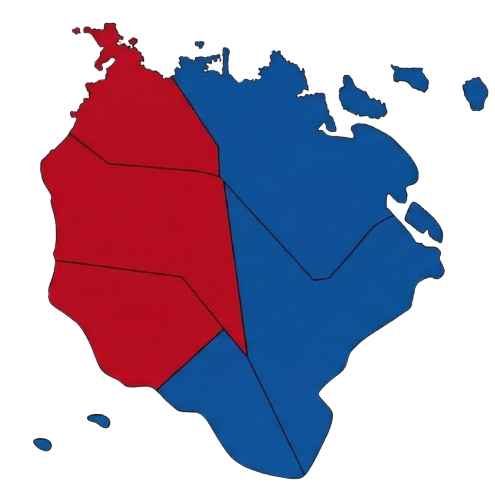
Sangunniang Panlalawigan districts of Marinduque. Areas shown in red represent the first district; blue represent the second district.

Party	Popular vote		Seats	
Party	Total	%	Total	%
PDP–Laban	101,518	40.63%	7	64%
Independent	89,645	35.88%	1	9%
Aksyon	42,743	17.11%	0	0%
PRP	7,821	3.13%	0	0%
ABC	6,571	2.63%	0	0%
NPC	1,540	0.62%	0	0%
Total	249,838	100%	8	73%

In the final list of candidates running for provincial-level positions released by the COMELEC, 20 candidates were announced as running for eight seats in the Provincial Board, with eleven candidates running in the first district and nine in the second district.

==== 1st District ====
Municipality: Boac, Mogpog, Gasan

Marinduque 1st District Sangguniang Panlalawigan election
Party	Candidate	Votes	%
PDP–Laban	Mark Julius Caballes	30,445	29.99
PDP–Laban	Aurelio Leva III	25,794	25.41
PDP–Laban	Antonio Mangcucang III	24,254	23.89
PDP–Laban	Bernadine Opis-Mercado	21,025	20.71
Independent	Rommel Seño	18,879	18.60
Aksyon	Gilbert Daquioag	18,710	18.43
Independent	Gerard Aliño	15,979	15.74
Independent	Noel Nieva	14,911	14.69
Aksyon	Adolfo Lazo	13,994	13.78
Independent	Pedrito Nepomuceno	7,753	7.64
ABC	Ruben Tan	6,571	6.47
Total votes		101,518	100.00

==== 2nd District ====
Municipality: Santa Cruz, Torrijos, Buenavista

Marinduque 2nd District Sangguniang Panlalawigan election
Party	Candidate	Votes	%
PDP–Laban	Mel Encabo	25,942	16.84
PDP–Laban	Mercedes Rejano	25,896	16.81
Independent	Danilo Red	25,521	16.57
PDP–Laban	Ishmael Lim	25,139	16.32
Independent	Lauren Rosales	24,344	15.80
Aksyon	Francisco Vilar	10,039	6.52
PRP	Eleuterio Raza Jr.	7,821	5.08
Independent	Preny Estrada	7,779	5.05
NPC	Arnel Garcia	1,540	1.00
Total votes		154,021	100.00

== Congressional election ==
Lord Allan Velasco, Speaker of the House of Representatives and son of governor Presbitero Velasco Jr., was the incumbent and was eligible to run for another term. He initially announced his candidacy for re-election on July 26, 2021, and confirmed this with local media outlet Marinduque News on October 3, 2021.

Velasco's opponent in the election was supposed to be former Provincial Board member Jojo Alvarez of Boac, running under Aksyon. However, Alvarez's certificate of candidacy was canceled by the COMELEC on December 14, 2021, and took effect on January 5, 2022.

Philippine House of Representatives election in Marinduque
Party	Candidate	Votes	%
PDP–Laban	Lord Allan Velasco	98,688	100.00
PDP–Laban hold			

== Municipal elections ==
Parties are as stated in their certificates of candidacy.

=== Boac ===
In Boac, the provincial capital, the municipal election was contested primarily between candidates from PDP–Laban and the Partido Federal ng Pilipinas (PFP).

==== Mayor ====
Incumbent Armi Carrion, the widow of former governor Jose Antonio Carrion, ran for re-election.

Boac mayoral election
Party	Candidate	Votes	%
PDP–Laban	Armi Carrion	17,081	58.16
PFP	James Dellosa	12,286	41.84
Total votes		29,367	100.00
PDP–Laban hold			

==== Vice Mayor ====
Incumbent Sonny Paglinawan ran for re-election. Unlike in the 2019 election, where he ran under PDP–Laban, he ran as a candidate of the PFP. PDP–Laban's candidate for the vice mayoral election was former Provincial Board member Mark Anthony Seño.

Boac vice mayoral election
Party	Candidate	Votes	%
PDP–Laban	Mark Anthony Seño	15,221	54.10
PFP	Sonny Paglinawan	12,912	45.90
Total votes		28,133	100.00
PDP–Laban gain from PFP			

=== Mogpog ===
In Mogpog, the municipal election was contested primarily between candidates from PDP–Laban and several independent candidates, with Aksyon fielding one candidate for councilor.

==== Mayor ====
Incumbent Augusto Leo Livelo ran for re-election.

Mogpog mayoral election
Party	Candidate	Votes	%
PDP–Laban	Augusto Leo Livelo	16,589	95.48
Independent	Ronilo Mangui	786	4.52
Total votes		17,375	100.00
PDP–Laban hold			

==== Vice Mayor ====
Incumbent Jonathan Garcia ran unopposed.

Mogpog vice mayoral election
Party	Candidate	Votes	%
PDP–Laban	Jonathan Garcia	15,441	100.00
PDP–Laban hold			

=== Gasan ===
In Gasan, the municipal election was contested primarily between candidates from the Alliance for Barangay Concerns, which last fielded candidates in the 2010 election, PDP–Laban and several independent candidates.

==== Mayor ====
Incumbent Victoria L. Lim, the mother of James Marty Lim, ran for re-election. Unlike in the 2019 election, where she ran under PDP–Laban, she ran as a candidate of the ABC. Her opponents in the election were former mayor Rolando Tolentino, who was PDP–Laban's candidate for this position, and the incumbent vice mayor, Yudel Sosa.

Gasan mayoral election
Party	Candidate	Votes	%
PDP–Laban	Rolando Tolentino	9,462	47.14
ABC	Victoria L. Lim	7,182	35.78
Independent	Yudel Sosa	3,427	17.08
Total votes		20,071	100.00
PDP–Laban gain from ABC			

==== Vice Mayor ====
Incumbent Yudel Sosa was term limited and ran for mayor.

Gasan vice mayoral election
Party	Candidate	Votes	%
ABC	Lidany Baldo	6,926	35.23
PDP–Laban	Baltazar Rey Jr.	6,603	33.59
Independent	Dunne Melton Motol	6,130	31.18
Total votes		19,659	100.00
ABC gain from Independent			

=== Santa Cruz ===
In Santa Cruz, the municipal election was contested primarily between candidates from Lakas–CMD, the Nationalist People's Coalition and the People's Reform Party.

==== Mayor ====
Incumbent Antonio Uy Jr. ran for re-election. Unlike in the 2019 election, where he ran under the United Nationalist Alliance, he ran as a candidate of the PRP. His opponents in the election were former mayor Marisa Red, and the incumbent vice mayor, Geraldine Morales.

Santa Cruz mayoral election
Party	Candidate	Votes	%
NPC	Marisa Red-Martinez	12,302	37.60
PRP	Antonio Uy Jr.	11,710	35.79
Lakas	Geraldine Morales	8,707	26.61
Total votes		32,719	100.00
NPC gain from PRP			

==== Vice Mayor ====
Incumbent Geraldine Morales ran for mayor.

Santa Cruz vice mayoral election
Party	Candidate	Votes	%
Independent	Bobs Manuel	16,037	51.28
NPC	Harold Red	6,876	21.99
PRP	Amelia Aguirre	5,155	16.48
Lakas	Sonny de la Rosa	3,206	10.25
Total votes		31,274	100.00
Independent gain from Lakas			

=== Torrijos ===
In Torrijos, the municipal election was contested primarily between candidates from PDP–Laban and Aksyon.

==== Mayor ====
Incumbent Lorna Velasco, the wife of Presbitero Velasco Jr., ran for re-election.

Torrijos mayoral election
Party	Candidate	Votes	%
PDP–Laban	Lorna Velasco	8,463	51.30
Aksyon	Joey Peñaflor	8,035	48.70
Total votes		16,498	100.00
PDP–Laban hold			

==== Vice Mayor ====
Incumbent Ricardo de Galicia ran for re-election.

Torrijos vice mayoral election
Party	Candidate	Votes	%
PDP–Laban	Ricardo de Galicia	8,439	53.85
Independent	Clodoveo Palatino Jr.	4,639	29.60
Aksyon	Alfredo Rosales	2,592	16.55
Total votes		15,670	100.00
PDP–Laban hold			

=== Buenavista ===
In Buenavista, the municipal election was contested primarily between candidates from PDP–Laban and Aksyon.

==== Mayor ====
Incumbent Nancy Madrigal ran for re-election.

Buenavista mayoral election
Party	Candidate	Votes	%
Aksyon	Eduard Siena	6,742	52.19
PDP–Laban	Nancy Madrigal	6,177	47.81
Total votes		12,919	100.00
Aksyon gain from PDP–Laban			

==== Vice Mayor ====
David Vitto assumed office after the death of Vice Mayor Hannilee Siena and ran for his first full term.

Buenavista vice mayoral election
Party	Candidate	Votes	%
PDP–Laban	David Vitto	7,317	61.12
Aksyon	Evelio Rosas	4,655	38.88
Total votes		11,972	100.00
PDP–Laban hold			
