= 2013 Marinduque local elections =

Philippine election

2013 Marinduque gubernatorial election
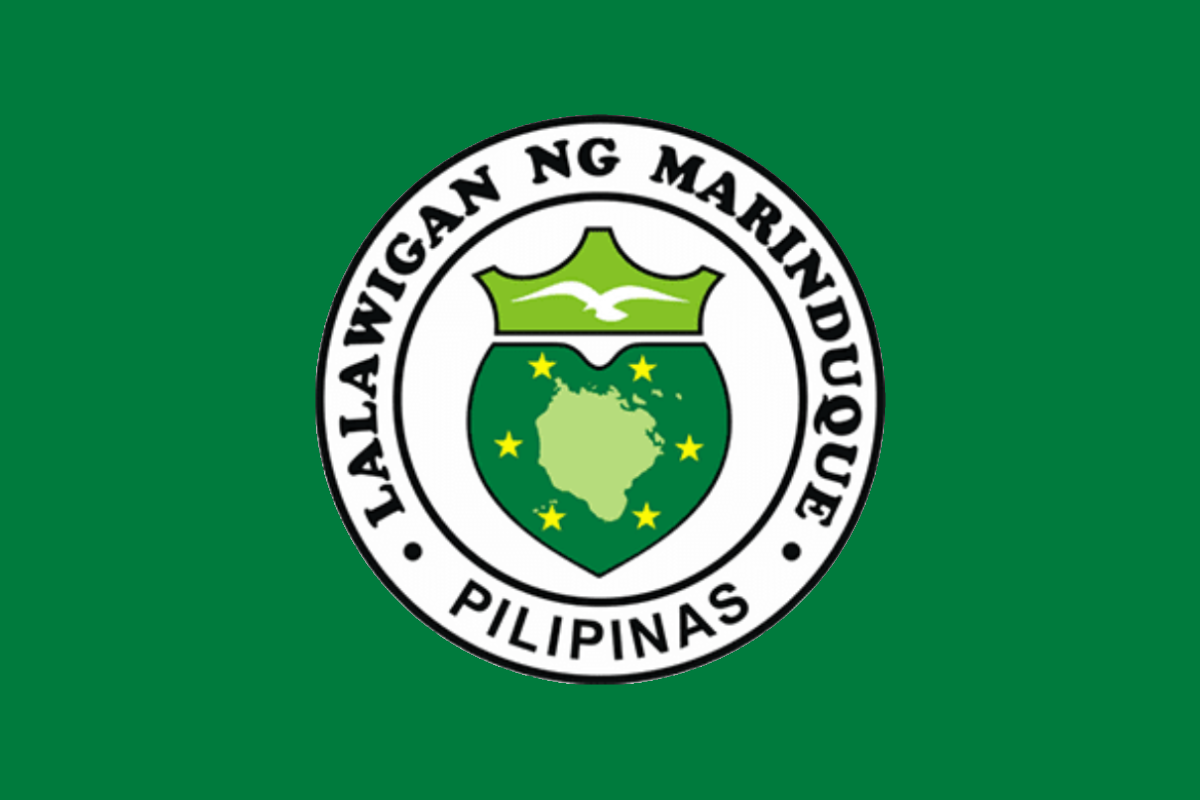
- May 13, 2013
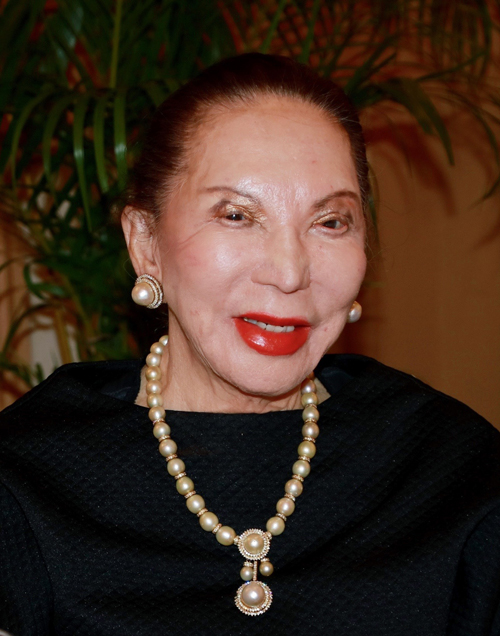

| Nominee | Carmencita Reyes | Antonio Uy Jr. | Jose Antonio Carrion |
| Party | Liberal | NUP | NPC |
| Running mate | Romulo Bacorro | n/a | Jose Alvarez |
| Popular vote | 53,869 | 25,836 | 18,706 |
| Percentage | 54.74 | 26.25 | 19.01 |
Governor before election
Carmencita Reyes
Liberal
Elected Governor
Carmencita Reyes
Liberal

Philippine House of Representatives election at Marinduque
- May 13, 2013
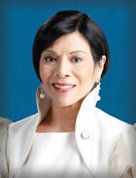

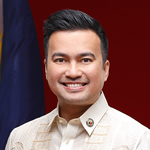
| Nominee | Regina Ongsiako Reyes | Lord Allan Jay Velasco |
| Party | Liberal | NUP |
| Popular vote | 52,209 | 48,396 |
| Percentage | 51.90% | 48.10% |
Congressman before election
Lord Allan Jay Velasco
NUP
Elected Congressman
Regina Ongsiako Reyes
Liberal

Local elections were held in Marinduque on May 13, 2013, as part of the 2013 general election. Voters selected candidates for all local positions: a town mayor, vice mayor and town councilors, as well as members of the Sangguniang Panlalawigan, a vice-governor, a governor and a representative for the lone district of Marinduque in the House of Representatives.

In this election, a number of provincial-level officials sought reelection, including incumbent governor Carmencita Reyes and incumbent congressman Lord Allan Jay Velasco.

== Background ==
=== Congressional election ===
Incumbent congressman Lord Allan Jay Velasco, who was first elected in the 2010 election, is running for a second term. Although he ran under the Lakas–CMD ticket in 2010, for this election he is running under the National Unity Party (NUP). His challenger is Regina Ongsiako Reyes, the daughter of incumbent governor Carmencita Reyes, running under the Liberal Party.

However, Reyes was ordered disqualified by the First Division of the Commission on Elections (Comelec) over her citizenship status. In its ruling, the Comelec cited the Citizenship Retention and Re-acquisition Act of 2003, claiming that Reyes was still an American citizen and she had failed to renounce her citizenship. In addition, the ruling notes that Reyes did not submit sufficient evidence that she had been resident in Marinduque for at least one year, citing documents which point to her term as Provincial Administrator. The ruling was affirmed by the Comelec en banc on May 14, 2013. But Commission on Election Chairman Sixto Brillantes in his dissenting opinion pointed that the evidence presented by Velasco's camp is a double hearsay and inadmissible since it was never sworn nor authenticated by the issuing officer and it was taken in an internet blog of unknown blogger.

Despite this, Reyes continued to sit as representative of Marinduque, with the Reyes camp claiming that it is the House of Representatives Electoral Tribunal (HRET), and not the Comelec or the Supreme Court, that should have jurisdiction over the case. On September 11, 2014, Gabriela Representative Luzviminda Ilagan said that the House of Representatives Electoral Tribunal voting 4-3 finally decided that they (HRET members) will uphold the exclusivity of jurisdiction over any protest or contest in the result of election of any House of Representatives members. With this development, the Commission's and the Supreme Court's respective decisions will be no longer in effect. Thus, Representative Regina Ongsiako Reyes was the seating Congresswoman of the Lone District of Marinduque but did not finish her 3-year term as she was later removed from her post and replaced by Velasco in February 2016.

=== Gubernatorial election ===
Incumbent governor Carmencita Reyes is running for a second term, having assumed the governorship after defeating then-incumbent Jose Antonio Carrion in the 2010 election, alongside her running mate, vice governor Antonio Uy Jr. Although she was a guest candidate of the Liberal Party the previous election, having run as a member of the party-list group Bigkis Pinoy, for this election she is running as the Liberal Party candidate. Reyes' running mate is doctor Romulo Bacorro.

Uy has since left the Liberal Party and has decided to run for governor under the NUP, the party of Congressman Velasco. However, he does not have a running mate; instead, the NUP is endorsing Melecio Go of the Nacionalista Party for the position of vice governor. Go is currently a member of the Sangguniang Panlalawigan for the province's first district, and was elected in 2010 as an independent.

Carrion was seeking to retake his seat after losing the previous election to Reyes. Though he ran under the Lakas–CMD ticket in 2010, for this election he is running under the banner of the Nationalist People's Coalition. His running mate is Jose Alvarez, who previously sat as a member of the Sangguniang Panlalawigan for the province's first district.

== Results ==
=== Provincial elections ===
Parties are as stated in their certificate of candidacies.

==== Gubernatorial election ====
Carmencita Reyes is the incumbent.

Marinduque gubernatorial election
| Party | Candidate | Votes | % |
|---|---|---|---|
| Liberal | Carmencita Reyes | 53,869 | 54.74 |
| NUP | Antonio Uy Jr. | 25,836 | 26.25 |
| NPC | Jose Antonio Carrion | 18,706 | 19.01 |
| Majority | | 28,033 | 28.49% |
| Total votes | | 98,411 | 100.00 |
| Liberal hold | | | |

==== Vice gubernatorial election ====
Incumbent Antonio Uy Jr. is running for governor

Marinduque Vice-Gubernatorial Election
| Party | Candidate | Votes | % |
|---|---|---|---|
| Liberal | Romulo Bacorro | 35,597 | 52.96 |
| Nacionalista | Melecio Go | 24,537 | 36.50 |
| NPC | Jose Alvarez | 7,084 | 10.54 |
| Total votes | | 84,132 | 100.00 |
| Liberal gain from NUP | | | |

=== Congressional election ===
Lord Allan Jay Velasco is the incumbent.

Philippine House of Representatives election at Marinduque
| Party | Candidate | Votes | % |
|---|---|---|---|
| Liberal | Regina Ongsiako Reyes | 52,209 | 51.90% |
| NUP | Lord Allan Jay Velasco | 48,396 | 48.10% |
| Margin of victory | | 3,813 | 3.79% |
| Rejected ballots | | | |
| Turnout | | | |
| Total votes | | 100,605 | 100.00 |
| Liberal gain from NUP | | | |

Despite being disqualified by the Comelec en banc, Regina Ongsiako Reyes was proclaimed anyway by the Provincial Board of Canvassers on May 15, 2013, although the camp of Lord Allan Jay Velasco attempted to stop the proclamation. Edwin Villa, the provincial election supervisor and head of Marinduque's Provincial Board of Canvassers, has since been replaced by Val Mendoza, the provincial election supervisor of Romblon, although it is unclear whether Mendoza assumed the position. Villa has since gone into hiding.

=== Provincial Board elections ===
==== 1st District ====
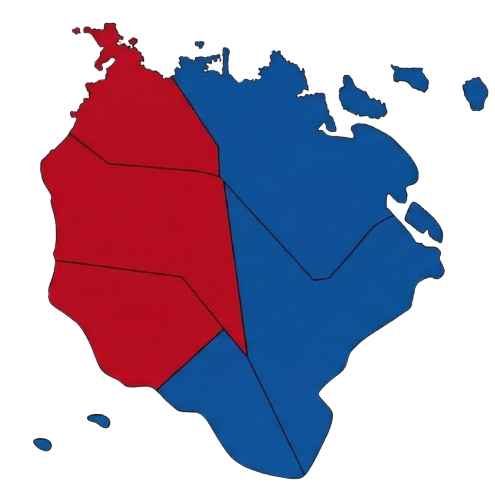
Sangunniang Panlalawigan districts of Marinduque. Areas shown in red represent the first district; blue represent second district.

Municipality: Boac, Mogpog, Gasan

Marinduque 1st District Sangguniang Panlalawigan election
| Party | Candidate | Votes | % |
|---|---|---|---|
| Independent | George Aliño II | 22,213 | 19.33 |
| NUP | Adeline Angeles | 20,042 | 17.44 |
| Liberal | Mark Anthony Seño | 19,190 | 16.70 |
| Liberal | Theresa Caballes | 18,803 | 16.36 |
| Liberal | Sebastian Mandalihan | 15,988 | 13.91 |
| Liberal | Robert Opis | 13,592 | 11.83 |
| NPC | Cesaria Zoleta | 5,095 | 4.43 |
| Total votes | | | |

==== 2nd District ====
Municipality: Sta. Cruz, Torrijos, Buenavista

Marinduque 2nd District Sangguniang Panlalawigan election
| Party | Candidate | Votes | % |
|---|---|---|---|
| Liberal | Juan Fernandez Jr. | 17,129 | 19.89 |
| Liberal | Harold Red | 14,759 | 17.14 |
| NUP | Amelia Aguirre | 13,027 | 15.13 |
| Liberal | Norma Ricohermoso | 10,929 | 12.69 |
| Liberal | Epifania Rosas | 10,434 | 12.12 |
| NUP | Benjo Buenviaje | 7,613 | 8.84 |
| NUP | Aristeo Lecaroz | 7,244 | 8.41 |
| NUP | Acio Revilla | 4,976 | 5.78 |
| Total votes | | | |

=== Municipal elections ===
Parties are as stated in their certificate of candidacies.

==== Boac ====
Roberto Madla is the incumbent.

Boac Mayoralty election
| Party | Candidate | Votes | % |
|---|---|---|---|
| NUP | Roberto Madla | 13,129 | 59.71 |
| Liberal | Allan Nepomuceno | 7,868 | 35.80 |
| Independent | Joven Labay | 986 | 4.49 |
| Total votes | | | |
| NUP hold | | | |

Dante Marquez is the incumbent.

Boac Vice-Mayoralty election
| Party | Candidate | Votes | % |
|---|---|---|---|
| Liberal | Dante Marquez | 8,499 | 40.00 |
| NUP | Wilson Mabute | 5,675 | 26.71 |
| Independent | Dave Daniel Larga | 3,314 | 15.60 |
| Independent | Louisito Majaba | 3,060 | 14.40 |
| Independent | Romeo De La Santa | 699 | 3.29 |
| Total votes | | | |
| Liberal hold | | | |

==== Mogpog ====
Senen Livelo Jr. is the incumbent.

Mogpog Mayoralty election
| Party | Candidate | Votes | % |
|---|---|---|---|
| Liberal | Senen Livelo Jr. | 9,337 | 62.79 |
| NUP | Jonathan Garcia | 5,534 | 37.21 |
| Majority | | 3,803 | 23.48% |
| Valid ballots | | 14,871 | 91.80 |
| Invalid or blank votes | | 1,328 | 8.20 |
| Total votes | | 16,199 | 100 |
| Liberal hold | | | |

Incumbent vice-mayor Sebastian Mandalihan is term limited and running for provincial board membership.

Mogpog Vice-Mayoralty election
| Party | Candidate | Votes | % |
|---|---|---|---|
| Independent | Rolando Mantala | 4,028 | 28.22 |
| Liberal | Florito Molbog | 3,858 | 27.03 |
| NUP | Melanio Maac | 2,814 | 19.72 |
| Independent | Ruben Tan | 2,477 | 17.36 |
| Independent | Monchito Lusterio | 1,095 | 7.67 |
| Majority | | 170 | 1.05% |
| Valid ballots | | 14,272 | 88.10 |
| Invalid or blank votes | | 1,927 | 11.90 |
| Total votes | | 16,199 | 100 |
| Independent gain from Liberal | | | |

==== Gasan ====
Victoria L. Lim is the incumbent.

Gasan Mayoralty election
| Party | Candidate | Votes | % |
|---|---|---|---|
| NUP | Victoria L. Lim | 8,086 | 50.44 |
| Liberal | Rolando Tolentino | 7,943 | 49.56 |
| Valid ballots | | 16,029 | 100 |
| NUP hold | | | |

Incumbent vice-mayor Servillano M. Balitaan is term-limited and is running for municipal councilor.

Gasan Vice-Mayoralty election
| Party | Candidate | Votes | % |
|---|---|---|---|
| NUP | Yudel Sosa | 5,199 | 34.86 |
| Independent | Ulysses Iturralde | 4,356 | 29.20 |
| Liberal | Florante Saet | 4,035 | 27.05 |
| NPC | Jose Maria Sore | 1,326 | 8.89 |
| Valid ballots | | 14,916 | 100 |
| NUP gain from NPC | | | |

==== Sta. Cruz ====
Percival Morales is the incumbent.

Sta. Cruz Mayoralty election
| Party | Candidate | Votes | % |
|---|---|---|---|
| Liberal | Wilfredo Red | 7,278 | 54.68 |
| NUP | Percival Morales | 6,031 | 45.32 |
| Total votes | | | |
| Liberal gain from NUP | | | |

Ishmael Lim is the incumbent.

Sta. Cruz Vice-Mayoralty election
| Party | Candidate | Votes | % |
|---|---|---|---|
| Liberal | Ishmael Lim | 7,265 | 57.99 |
| NUP | Dennis Morales | 5,262 | 42.01 |
| Total votes | | | |
| Liberal hold | | | |

==== Torrijos ====
Gil Briones is the incumbent.

Torrijos Mayoralty election
| Party | Candidate | Votes | % |
|---|---|---|---|
| Lakas | Gil Briones | 7,186 | 62.03 |
| NUP | Rolly Villar | 4,399 | 37.97 |
| Total votes | | | |
| Lakas hold | | | |

Roberto Macdon is the incumbent.

Torrijos Vice-Mayoralty election
| Party | Candidate | Votes | % |
|---|---|---|---|
| Liberal | Roberto Macdon | 7,284 | 66.87 |
| Independent | Preny Estrada | 3,609 | 33.13 |
| Total votes | | | |
| Liberal hold | | | |

==== Buenavista ====
Incumbent Russel S. Madrigal is running unopposed.

Buenavista Mayoralty election
| Party | Candidate | Votes | % |
|---|---|---|---|
| NUP | Russel S. Madrigal | 6,843 | 100.00 |
| NUP hold | | | |

Incumbent Montano Saguid is running unopposed.

Buenavista Vice-Mayoralty election
| Party | Candidate | Votes | % |
|---|---|---|---|
| Liberal | Montano Saguid | 5,585 | 100.00 |
| Liberal hold | | | |
