= 2016 Marinduque local elections =

Philippine election

2016 Marinduque gubernatorial election
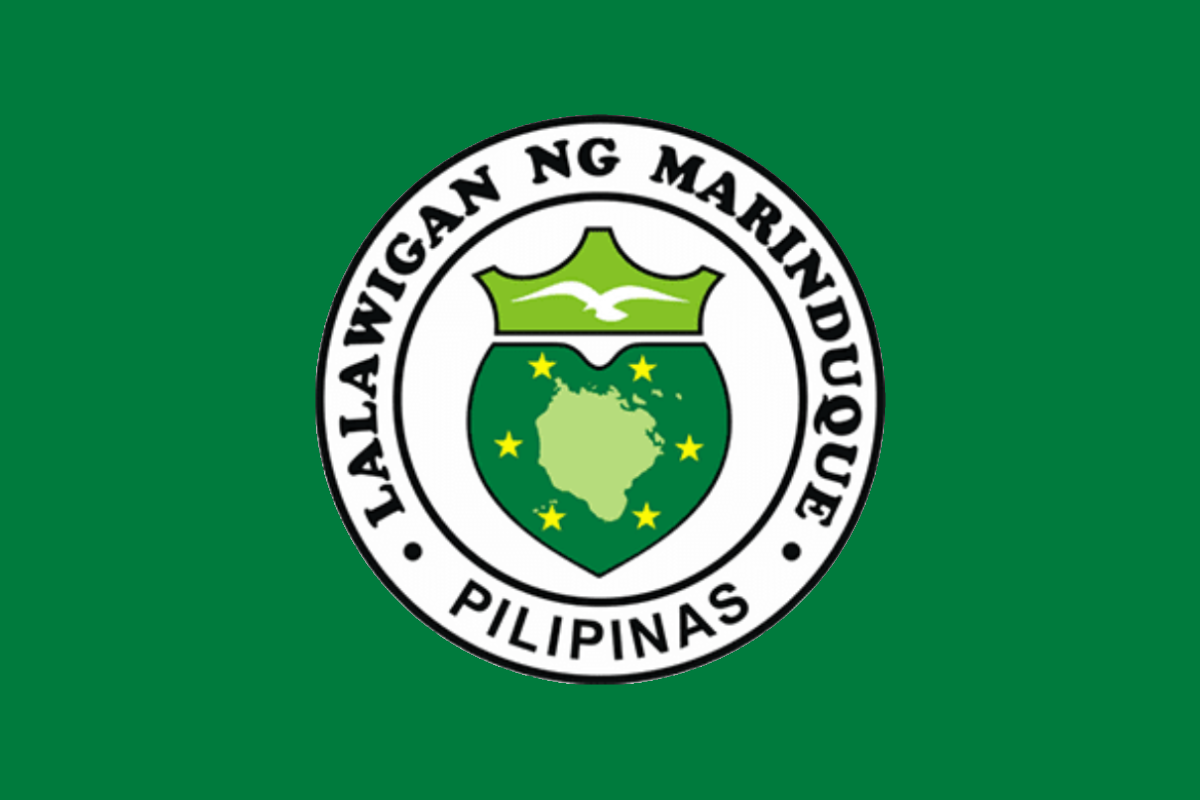
- May 9, 2016
- Registered: 136,110
- Turnout: 86.73%
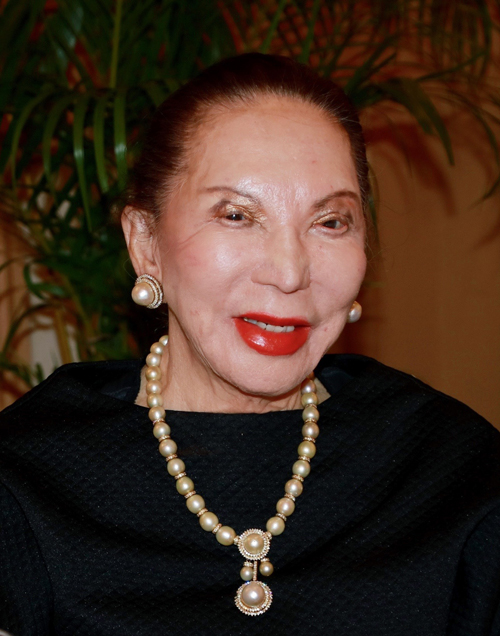

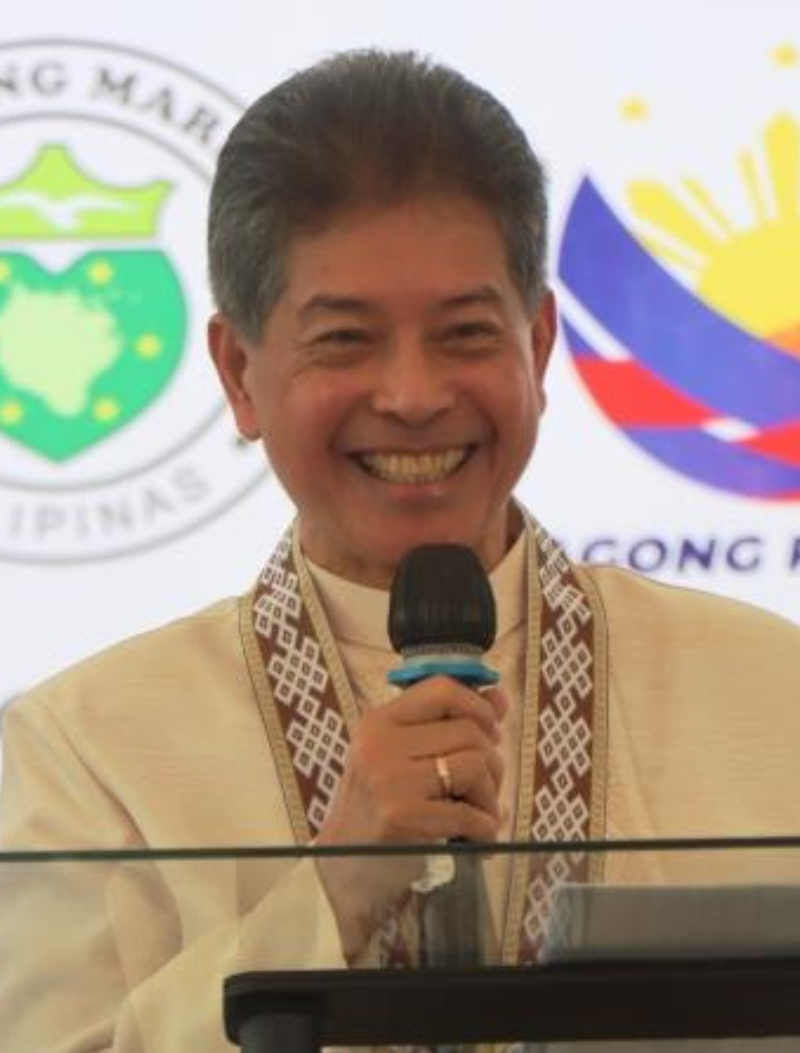
Candidate	Carmencita Reyes	Victoria L. Lim	Melecio Go
Party	Liberal	Independent	Nacionalista
Running mate	Romulo Bacorro
Popular vote	57,490	34,800	12,918
Percentage	54.64	33.08	12.28
Governor before election
Carmencita Reyes
Liberal
Elected Governor
Carmencita Reyes
Liberal

Philippine House of Representatives election at Marinduque
- May 9, 2016
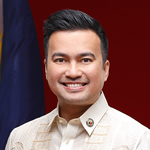

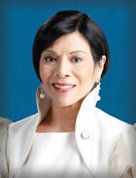
Candidate	Lord Allan Jay Velasco	Regina Ongsiako Reyes
Party	NUP	Liberal
Popular vote	60,585	49,005
Percentage	55.28	44.72
Congressman before election
Lord Allan Jay Velasco
NUP
Elected Congressman
Lord Allan Jay Velasco
NUP

Local elections were held in the province of Marinduque on May 9, 2016, as part of the 2016 general election. Voters selected candidates for all local positions: a town mayor, vice mayor and town councilors, as well as members of the Sangguniang Panlalawigan, a vice-governor, a governor and a representative for the lone district of Marinduque in the House of Representatives.

In this election, a number of provincial-level officials are seeking reelection, including incumbent governor Carmencita Reyes and incumbent congresswoman Regina O. Reyes.

== Results ==
=== Governor ===
Carmencita Reyes is the incumbent.

Marinduque gubernatorial election
Party	Candidate	Votes	%
Liberal	Carmencita Reyes	57,490	54.64%
Independent	Victoria L. Lim	34,800	33.08%
Nacionalista	Melecio Go	12,918	12.28%
Majority		22,690	21.57%
Total votes		105,208	100.00%
Liberal hold			

=== Vice Governor ===
Romulo Bacorro is the incumbent.

Marinduque Vice-Gubernatorial Election
Party	Candidate	Votes	%
Liberal	Romulo Bacorro	64,526	81.22%
UNA	Francis Garcia	14,915	18.78%
Total votes		79,441	100.00%
Liberal hold			

=== District Representative ===
Regina Ongsiako Reyes was the congresswoman from June 30, 2013 - February 1, 2016. Reyes was disqualified by the Supreme Court due to issues with her citizenship. Lord Allan Jay Q. Velasco was sworn on February 1, 2016, becoming the incumbent representative.

Philippine House of Representatives election at Marinduque
Party	Candidate	Votes	%	±%
NUP	Lord Allan Jay Velasco	60,585	55.28%	+7.18%
Liberal	Regina Ongsiako Reyes	49,005	44.72%	−7.18%
Margin of victory		11,580	10.56%	0%
Total votes		109,590	100.00%	
NUP hold				

=== Provincial Board elections ===
==== 1st District ====
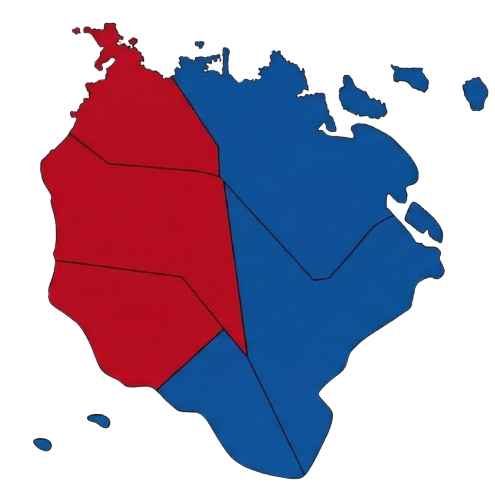
Sangunniang Panlalawigan districts of Marinduque. Areas shown in red represent the first district; blue represent second district.

Municipality: Boac, Mogpog, Gasan

Marinduque 1st District Sangguniang Panlalawigan election
Party	Candidate	Votes	%
Liberal	Mark Anthony Seño	28,930	18.12%
Liberal	Theresa Caballes	26,736	16.75%
Independent	John R. Pelaez	23,910	14.98%
Independent	Gilbert Daquioag	20,057	12.57%
Liberal	Cristina Festin-Tan	19,638	12.30%
Liberal	Cirilo Monilla	12,125	7.59%
Independent	Wilson Mabute	10,430	6.53%
Independent	Jose Alvarez	9,518	5.96%
Independent	Floro "Boyet" Villamin Jr	8,267	5.18%
Total votes		159,611	100.00%

==== 2nd District ====
Municipality: Sta. Cruz, Torrijos, Buenavista

Marinduque 2nd District Sangguniang Panlalawigan election
Party	Candidate	Votes	%
UNA	Amelia Aguirre	21,405	15.68%
Independent	Reynaldo Salvacion	20,978	15.36%
Liberal	Juan Fernandez Jr.	20,941	15.34%
Liberal	Harold Red	17,005	12.46%
Independent	Erlando Nuñez	15,284	11.19%
Liberal	Norma Ricohermoso	13,941	10.21%
Liberal	Sabino Fabrero	13,430	9.83%
Independent	Epifania Rosas	10,651	7.80%
Independent	Modest Rey Peñarubia	2,896	2.12%
Total votes		136,531	100.00%

=== Municipal elections ===
Parties are as stated in their certificates of candidacy.

==== Boac ====
===== Mayor =====
Roberto Madla is the incumbent.

Boac Mayoralty election
Party	Candidate	Votes	%
Liberal	Roberto "Bert" Madla	17,615	75.9%
UNA	Pedrito Nepomuceno	5,602	24.1%
Total votes		23,217	100%
Liberal hold			

===== Vice Mayor =====
Incumbent Dante Marquez is not running for re-election. Despite listed in the ballot as an Independent, Luisito Laylay later joined the Liberal Party.

Boac Vice Mayoralty election
Party	Candidate	Votes	%
Independent	Robert E. Opis	11,971	51.3%
Liberal	Luisito "Sito" Laylay	11,356	48.7%
Total votes		23,327	100%
Independent gain from Liberal			

==== Mogpog ====
===== Mayor =====
Incumbent Mayor Senen Livelo, Jr. is term limited and not running for any other political position. His brother, Municipal Administrator Augusto Leo Livelo, is the party's nominee.

Mogpog Mayoralty election
Party	Candidate	Votes	%
Liberal	Augusto Leo Livelo	5,033	30.8%
KBL	Jonathan Garcia	3,582	21.9%
NPC	Adeline Angeles	3,375	20.7%
Independent	Rolando Mantala	2,821	17.3%
Independent	Adolfo Lazo	1,018	6.2%
Independent	Ruben Tan	497	3.0%
Total votes		16,326	100%
Liberal hold			

===== Vice Mayor =====
Incumbent Vice Mayor Rolando Mantala is running for mayor.

Mogpog Vice Mayoralty election
Party	Candidate	Votes	%
Independent	Belen Luisaga	5,622	37.5%
Liberal	Sebastian Mandalihan	5,054	33.7%
KBL	Lodalina Issa	4,314	28.8%
Total votes		14,990	100%
Independent gain from Independent			

==== Gasan ====
===== Mayor =====
Incumbent Mayor Victoria L. Lim is term limited and is running for governor. Her sister-in-law, Lisa J. Lao, is running for mayor in her stead, although they don't belong to the same political party.

Gasan Mayoralty election
Party	Candidate	Votes	%
Liberal	Rolando Tolentino	9,044	56.01%
NPC	Lisa J. Lao	7,102	43.98%
Total votes		16,146	100%
Liberal gain from Independent			

===== Vice Mayor =====
Yudel Sosa is the incumbent.

Gasan Vice Mayoralty election
Party	Candidate	Votes	%
Independent	Yudel Sosa	5,526	34.94%
Independent	Henry Evia	5,215	32.97%
Liberal	Floro "Vice Boy" Villamin	2,382	15.06%
NPC	Erwin Lim	2,295	14.51%
Independent	Bert Madla	396	2.50%
Total votes		15,814	100%
Independent hold			

==== Santa Cruz ====
===== Mayor =====
Incumbent Mayor Wilfredo Red is retiring from politics, her daughter Marisa is the party's nominee.

Santa Cruz Mayoralty election
Party	Candidate	Votes	%
Liberal	Marisa Red	10,187	38.28%
KBL	Antonio Uy, Jr.	9,444	35.48%
Independent	Ishmael Lim	6,980	26.22%
Total votes		26,611	100%
Liberal hold			

===== Vice Mayor =====
Incumbent Vice Mayor Ishmael Lim is running for mayor.

Santa Cruz Vice Mayoralty election
Party	Candidate	Votes	%
Liberal	Geraldine Morales	16,628	66.13%
Independent	Mercedes R. Rejano	8,513	33.86%
Total votes		25,141	100%
Liberal gain from Independent			

==== Torrijos ====
===== Mayor =====
Incumbent Mayor Gil Briones is term limited and running for councilor. Notably, Ang Mata'y Alagaan party-list representative Lorna Velasco, wife of Supreme Court Associate Justice Presbitero Velasco and mother of Lord Allan Jay Velasco, is running for mayor.

Torrijos Mayoralty election
Party	Candidate	Votes	%
NUP	Lorna Velasco	5,654	42.8%
Liberal	Joey Peñaflor	4,653	35.2%
Independent	Roberto Macdon	2,918	22.1%
Total votes		13,225	100%
NUP gain from Lakas			

===== Vice Mayor =====
Incumbent Vice Mayor Roberto Macdon is running for mayor.

Torrijos Vice Mayoralty election
Party	Candidate	Votes	%
Liberal	Ricardo de Galicia	6,941	58.3%
Independent	Rolly Villar	2,660	22.4%
Independent	Angel Pimentel	2,298	19.3%
Total votes		11,899	100%
Liberal gain from Independent			

==== Buenavista ====
===== Mayor =====
Russel Madrigal is the incumbent.

Buenavista Mayoralty election
Party	Candidate	Votes	%
NPC	Russel Madrigal	5,989	58.97%
Liberal	Eve Rosas	4,167	41.02%
Total votes		11,401	100%
NPC hold			

===== Vice Mayor =====
Bert Fabrero is the incumbent, he took the post upon the death of Montano Saguid in October 2013.

Buenavista Vice Mayoralty election
Party	Candidate	Votes	%
Liberal	Hanilee Siena	5,670	57.11%
NPC	Bert Fabrero	4,257	42.88%
Total votes		11,401	100%
Liberal gain from NPC			
