= 2010 Marinduque local elections =

Election in the Philippines

2010 Marinduque gubernatorial election
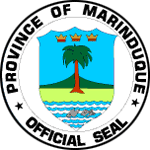
- May 10, 2010
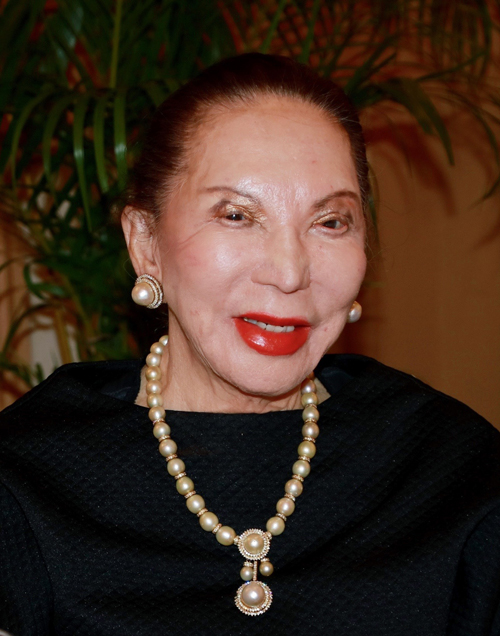

Nominee	Carmencita Reyes	Jose Antonio Carrion
Party	Bigkis	Lakas–Kampi
Running mate	Antonio Uy Jr.	Jasper Lim
Popular vote	40,639	28,548
Percentage	41.54%	29.18%
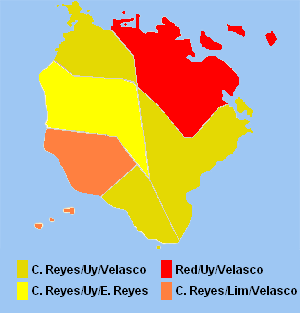
- The colors indicate municipalities where a candidate gathered the majority of votes(governor/vice-governor/congressman): Dirty Yellow for Carmencita Reyes / Antonio Uy / Allan Velasco, Yellow for Carmencita Reyes / Antonio Uy / Edmundo Reyes, Orange for Carmencita Reyes / Jasper Lim / Allan Velasco and Red for Wilfredo Red / Antonio Uy / Allan Velasco. Incumbent Jose Antonio Carrion, Narciso Daquioag and incumbent vice-governor Tomas Pizarro was unable to secure a majority in any of the municipalities.
Governor before election
Jose Antonio Carrion
Lakas–Kampi
Elected Governor
Carmencita Reyes
Bigkis

Philippine House of Representatives election at Marinduque
- May 10, 2010
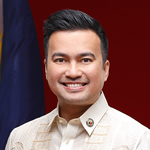

Nominee	Lord Allan Jay Velasco	Edmundo O. Reyes
Party	Lakas–Kampi	Liberal
Popular vote	52,407	48,300
Percentage	52.04%	47.96%
Congressman before election
Carmencita Reyes
Bigkis
Elected Congressman
Lord Allan Jay Velasco
Lakas–Kampi

Local elections were held in the province of Marinduque on May 10, 2010, as part of the 2010 general election. Voters selected candidates for all local positions: a town mayor, vice mayor and town councilors, as well as four members of the Sangguniang Panlalawigan, the vice-governor, governor and representative for the lone district of Marinduque.

== Gubernatorial, vice gubernatorial and congressional election ==
Incumbent governor Jose Antonio N. Carrion will run for his second term as governor of Marinduque. This election, he will run under the Lakas-Kampi-CMD banner; he ran previously as an independent on the last election.

Incumbent congresswoman Carmencita Reyes is allowed to run for a second term, but chose to run for governor. She was formerly a member of Lakas–CMD but became an independent candidate due to the Carrion's membership of Lakas-Kampi-CMD. Despite all of this she was the guest candidate of the Liberal party. On the ballot she was Bigkis Pinoy's candidate.

Former Sta. Cruz mayor and businessman Wilfredo Red will run again for governor. He failed to win the previous election and was in the last place in the race for governor, which was won by Carrion.

Incumbent vice-governor Tomas Pizarro will run for his second term as vice-governor of Marinduque. He was a member of Kampi during the last election. He defected to the Nacionalista Party for this election.

Incumbent sangunniang panlalawigan member Jasper Lim is allowed to run for a third term, but chose to run for vice-governor. He was bannered under his brother and former Liga ng mga Barangay sa Pilipinas president James Marty Lim's Alliance for Barangay Concerns party. He is also the running mate of Carrion under the Lakas-Kampi-CMD

With Carmencita Reyes running for governor, her son and former congressman Edmundo O. Reyes is expected to reclaim his seat. He defected to the Liberal party after Carrion's membership to Lakas-Kampi-CMD party. He did not run in the previous election because he was ineligible to run because he already claimed the three-term limit.

Provincial Administrator and Carrion ally Lord Allan Jay Velasco will also run for the congressional seat, despite having no previous experience in Marinduque politics but, as provincial administrator, Velasco is the Lakas-Kampi-CMD nominee for the said congressional elections.

The primary issue for this upcoming elections was the ongoing power crisis happening at Marinduque.

== Results ==
=== Provincial and congressional election results ===
Parties are as stated in their certificate of candidacies.

Marinduque Gubernatorial election
Party	Candidate	Votes	%
Bigkis	Carmencita O. Reyes^{[A]}	40,639	41.54
Lakas–Kampi	Jose Antonio N. Carrion (incumbent)	28,548	29.18
Independent	Wilfredo Red	27,799	28.41
Independent	Narciso Daquioag	849	0.87
Majority		12,091	12.36
Valid ballots		97,835	94.06
Invalid or blank votes		6,178	5.94
Total votes		104,013	100.00
Bigkis gain from Lakas–Kampi			

Notes

- A* Carmencita Reyes is also a guest candidate of the Liberal Party.

Marinduque Vice-Gubernatorial election
Party	Candidate	Votes	%
Liberal	Antonio Uy Jr.	47,345	51.75
Lakas–Kampi	Jasper Lim^{[B]}	30,845	33.72
Nacionalista	Tomas Pizarro (incumbent)	13,297	14.53
Majority		16,500	18.35
Valid ballots		91,487	87.96
Invalid or blank votes		12,526	12.04
Total votes		104,013	100.00
Liberal gain from Nacionalista			

Philippine House of Representatives election at Marinduque
Party	Candidate	Votes	%
Lakas–Kampi	Lord Allan Jay Q. Velasco	52,407	52.04
Liberal	Edmundo O. Reyes	48,300	47.96
Valid ballots		100,707	96.82
Invalid or blank votes		3,306	3.18
Total votes		104,013	100.00
Lakas–Kampi gain from Liberal			

=== Sangguniang Panlalawigan Election results ===
Voting is via plurality-at-large voting: in each of Marinduque's two districts, voters will vote for four members of the provincial legislature, then the four candidates with the highest number of votes are elected.

Party	Votes	%	Seats
Liberal Party	104,242	38.10	5
Lakas Kampi CMD	62,339	22.79	1
Nacionalista Party	18,472	6.75	0
Independent	88,514	32.36	2
Ex officio seats			3
Total	273,567	100.00	11
Total votes	104,013	–	

==== 1st District ====
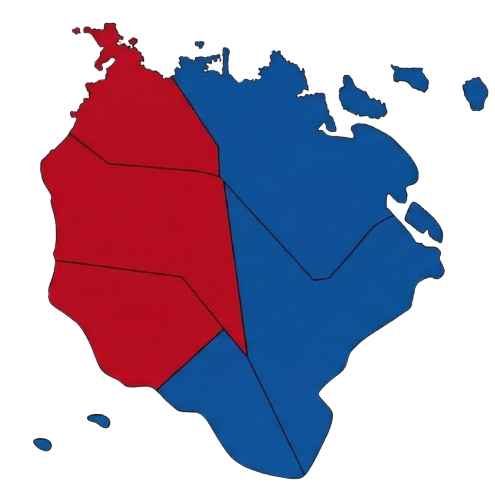
Sangunniang Panlalawigan districts of Marinduque. Areas shown in red represent the first district; blue represent second district.

Municipality: Boac, Mogpog, Gasan

Marinduque 1st District Sangguniang Panlalawigan election
Party	Candidate	Votes	%
Independent	Melecio Go	21,149	14.71
Liberal	Allan Nepomuceno	21,130	14.69
Liberal	Mark Anthony Seño	16,424	11.42
Independent	George Aliño II	15,879	11.04
Independent	Leticia Monte	15,852	11.02
Liberal	Florante Saet	13,959	9.71
Nacionalista	Robert Narito	10,784	7.50
Independent	Rolando Larracas	10,629	7.39
Lakas–Kampi	Henry Evia	10,274	7.14
Independent	Ramoncito Morales	7,729	5.38
Total votes		54,492	100.00

- Mark Joseph de Leon (Independent) was disqualified after the ballots were printed. All of his votes are considered spoilt.

==== 2nd District ====
Municipality: Sta. Cruz, Torrijos, Buenavista

Marinduque 2nd District Sangguniang Panlalawigan election
Party	Candidate	Votes	%
Lakas–Kampi	Amelia Aguirre	18,212	14.04
Liberal	Harold Red	15,231	11.74
Liberal	Eleuterio R. Raza, Jr.	14,693	11.32
Liberal	Epifania Rosas	12,888	9.93
Lakas–Kampi	Idelfonso De Los Santos	12,483	9.62
Independent	Aristeo Lecaroz	12,426	9.58
Lakas–Kampi	Yolando Querubin	11,610	8.95
Liberal	Ramfel Preclaro	9,917	7.64
Lakas–Kampi	Cesaria Zoleta	9,760	7.52
Nacionalista	Juan Carlos Pizarro	7,688	5.92
Independent	Manuel Rejano	4,850	3.74
Total votes		49,521	100.00

=== Municipal Election results ===
Parties are as stated in their certificate of candidacies.

==== Boac ====
Boac Mayoralty election
Party	Candidate	Votes	%
Lakas–Kampi	Roberto Madla	11,625	53.43
Liberal	Meynardo Solomon (incumbent)	7,918	36.39
PMP	Jose Alvarez	1,591	7.31
Independent	Pedrito Nepomuceno	624	2.87
Majority		3,707	16.27
Valid ballots		21,758	95.48
Invalid or blank votes		1,030	4.52
Total votes		22,788	100
Lakas–Kampi gain from Liberal			

- Jose Alvarez later joined the Pwersa ng Masang Pilipino. However he is still listed on the official ballot as an independent candidate.
- Roberto Madla later joined the Lakas-Kampi-CMD. However he is still listed on the official ballot as an independent

Boac Vice-Mayoralty election
Party	Candidate	Votes	%
Liberal	Dante Marquez (incumbent)	14,645	74.28
Independent	Enrique Palma	4,531	22.98
Independent	Christopher Lazarte	539	2.73
Majority		10,114	44.38%
Valid ballots		19,715	86.51
Invalid or blank votes		3,073	13.49
Total votes		22,788	100
Liberal hold			

==== Mogpog ====
Mogpog Mayoralty election
Party	Candidate	Votes	%
Lakas–Kampi	Senen Livelo Jr. (incumbent)	7,464	50.23
Liberal	Jonathan Garcia	6,560	44.15
Independent	Ruben Tan	836	5.63
Majority		904	5.74%
Valid ballots		14,860	94.31
Invalid or blank votes		897	5.69
Total votes		15,757	100
Lakas–Kampi hold			

Mogpog Vice-Mayoralty election
Party	Candidate	Votes	%
Lakas–Kampi	Sebastian Mandalihan (incumbent)	7,483	54.41
Liberal	Rolando Mantala	6,271	45.59
Majority		1,212	7.69%
Valid ballots		13,754	87.29
Invalid or blank votes		2,003	12.71
Total votes		15,757	100
Lakas–Kampi hold			

==== Gasan ====
Gasan Mayoralty election
Party	Candidate	Votes	%
Lakas–Kampi	Victoria L. Lim^{[B]} (incumbent)	8,455	54.64
Liberal	Rolando Tolentino	7,018	45.36
Majority		1,437	9.011%
Valid ballots		13,754	86.25
Invalid or blank votes		2,193	13.75
Total votes		15,947	100
Lakas–Kampi hold			

Gasan Vice-Mayoralty election
Party	Candidate	Votes	%
Lakas–Kampi	Servillano M. Balitaan^{[B]} (incumbent)	8,822	59.40
Liberal	Patrick Del Mundo	6,029	40.60
Majority		2,793	17.51%
Valid ballots		14,851	93.13
Invalid or blank votes		1,096	6.87
Total votes		15,947	100
Lakas–Kampi hold			

Notes

- * James Marty Lim's party-list Alliance for Barangay Concerns is also a local political party in Gasan, Marinduque and in coalition with the Lakas Kampi CMD. (Includes Jasper Lim and political officials of Gasan under Lakas Kampi CMD)

==== Sta. Cruz ====
Sta. Cruz Mayoralty election
Party	Candidate	Votes	%
Lakas–Kampi	Percival Morales	15,508	62.10
Liberal	Ruben F. Revilla (incumbent)	9,463	37.90
Total votes		24,971	100
Lakas–Kampi gain from Liberal			

Sta. Cruz Vice-Mayoralty election
Party	Candidate	Votes	%
Liberal	Ishmael Lim	11,821	49.45
Lakas–Kampi	Alejandro Palamos (incumbent)	11,350	47.48
Independent	Gilbert Ordillano	733	3.07
Total votes		23,904	100
Liberal gain from Lakas–Kampi			

==== Torrijos ====
Torrijos Mayoralty election
Party	Candidate	Votes	%
Lakas–Kampi	Gil Briones (incumbent)	5,319	44.56
Liberal	Juan Fernandez Jr.	4,511	37.79
Independent	Gabriel Revilla	1,830	15.33
Independent	Anselmo Pedrigal	278	2.33
Total votes		11,938	100
Lakas–Kampi hold			

Torrijos Vice-Mayoralty election
Party	Candidate	Votes	%
Liberal	Roberto Macdon	4,937	42.48
Independent	Eugene Arellano	3,350	28.82
Lakas–Kampi	Ronald Laus	2,156	18.55
Independent	Preny Estrada	867	7.46
Independent	Romualdo Regio	312	2.68
Total votes		11,622	100
Liberal hold			

==== Buenavista ====
Buenavista Mayoralty election
Party	Candidate	Votes	%
Lakas–Kampi	Russel Madrigal	4,158	52.77
Liberal	Hanilee Siena	2,685	34.07
Nacionalista	Celso Arevalo	826	10.48
Independent	Anatalio Balace	211	2.68
Total votes		7,880	100
Lakas–Kampi hold			

Buenavista Vice-Mayoralty election
Party	Candidate	Votes	%
Liberal	Montano Saguid	3,933	54.25
Independent	David Vitto	3,317	45.75
Total votes		7,250	100
Liberal gain from Lakas–Kampi			
