= List of vice governors of Marinduque =

Vice Governor of Marinduque
- Incumbent; Romulo Bacorro Jr. since June 30, 2025
- Seat: Marinduque Provincial Capitol
- Nominator: Political party
- Term length: 3 years Up to three terms

The Vice Governor of Marinduque (Filipino: Pangalawang Punong Lalawigan ng Marinduque) is the presiding officer of the Sangguniang Panlalawigan, the legislature of the provincial government of Marinduque, Philippines.

The current vice governor is Romulo Bacorro Jr., in office since 2025.

== List of Vice Governors ==
No.	Vice Governor	Term
1	Casiano D. Aloyon	1955-1963
2	Aristeo M. Lecaroz	1963-1967
3	Celso S. Zoleta Jr.	1967-1980
4	Luisito M. Reyes	1980-1986
5	Salvador Jamilla	1986-1988
6	Maximo S. Lim	1988-1992
7	Rosario S. Jugo	1995
8	Teodorito J. Rejano	1998-2004
9	Leandro Palma	2004-2007
10	Tomas N. Pizarro	2007-2010
11	Antonio L. Uy Jr.	2010-2013
12	Romulo Bacorro Jr.	2013-2019
13	Mark Anthony Seño	2019
(12)	Romulo Bacorro Jr.	2019-2022
14	Adeline Marciano-Angeles	2022-2025
(12)	Romulo Bacorro Jr.	2025-present

== See also ==
- Governor of Marinduque
