= Alliance for Barangay Concerns =

Political party in the Philippines

- — Philippine partylist —
- Full name: Alliance for Barangay Concerns
- Abbreviation: ABC
- Chairperson: James Marty Lim

The Alliance for Barangay Concerns (ABC) is a political party in the Philippines. It is accredited by the Commission on Elections as a party-list group. The ABC is headed by its national party chairman, James Marty Lim, the former national president of the Liga ng mga Barangay.

== Electoral history ==
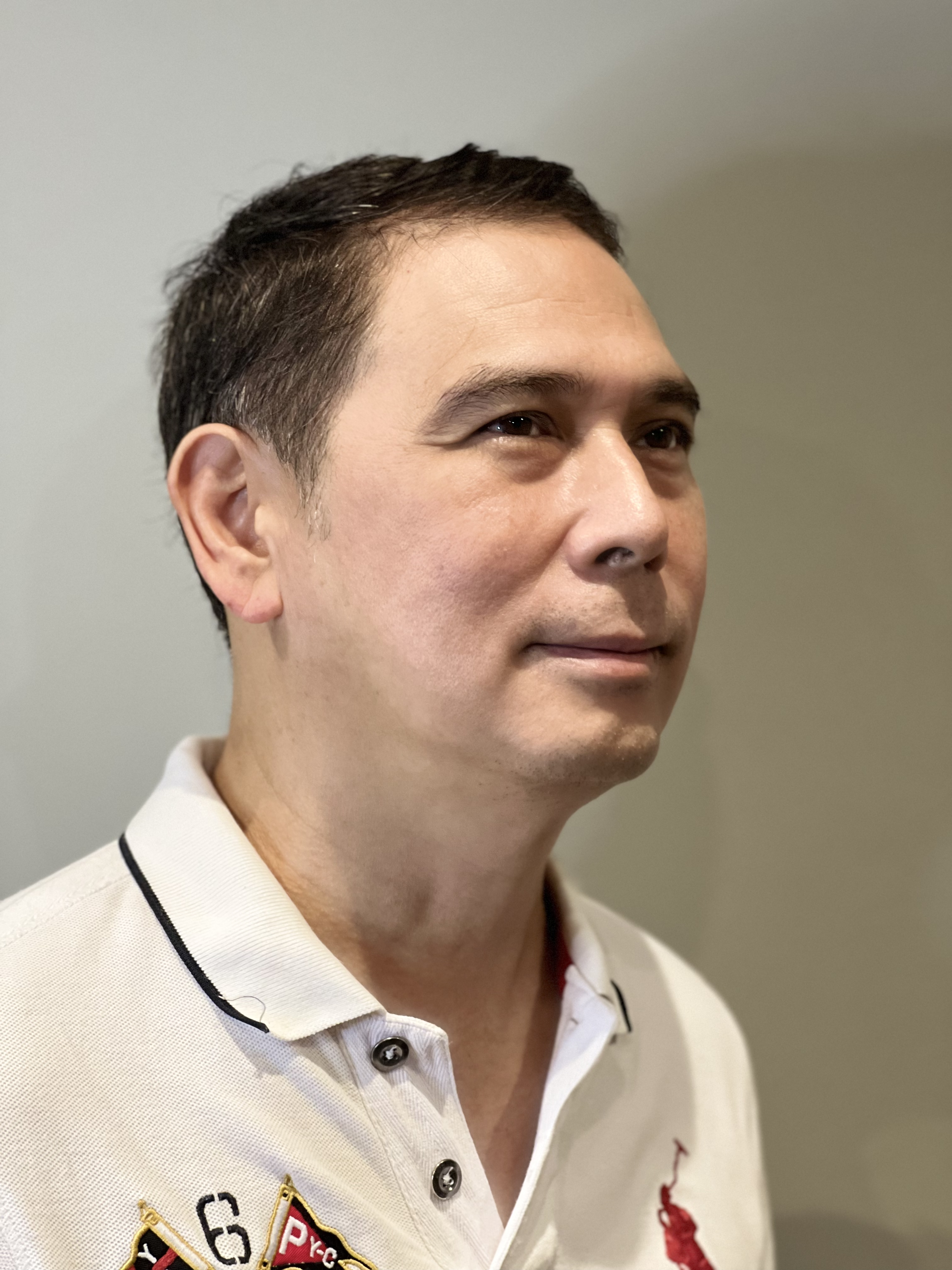
A portrait of the leader, James Marty Lim.

In the 2007 election, the ABC received 0.63 percent of the party-list vote as of June 4, 2007, placing it in 43rd place in the overall party-list count, while in the 2010 party-list election, the ABC received a 1.9% rating in a survey released by the Social Weather Stations last April 2010, and subsequently won one seat, but was disqualified for being a front of the Members Church of God International.

The ABC also fields candidates for local positions in the province of Marinduque. In the 2007 elections, one mayor, one vice-mayor, one provincial board member and six town councilors from its Marinduque slate, all from the municipality of Gasan, won in the election. The party is once again fielding candidates for the 2022 elections, with Lim running as its candidate for provincial governor.

== Electoral performance ==
Election	Votes	%	Seats
2007	90,125	0.56%	0
2010	471,407	1.58%	0
