= Marinduque's at-large congressional district =

Legislative district of the Philippines

- Constituency for the House of Representatives of the Philippines
- Location of Marinduque within the Philippines
- Province: Marinduque
- Region: Mimaropa
- Population: 239,207 (2020)
- Electorate: 165,436 (2025)
- Area: 952.58 km^{2} (367.79 sq mi)

Current constituency
- Created: 1922 (single-member district)
- Representative: Reynaldo Salvacion
- Created from: Tayabas-1
- Political party: Lakas
- Congressional bloc: Majority

Marinduque's at-large congressional district, also known as Marinduque's lone district, is the sole congressional district of the Philippines in the province of Marinduque. Marinduque has been represented in the country's various national legislatures since 1898. The first congressional delegation consisted of two members in the First Philippine Republic legislature known as the Malolos Congress. Since 1922 when it was re-established as a regular province separate from Tayabas, Marinduque has been entitled to one member in the House of Representatives of the Philippines, elected provincewide at-large, except for a brief period between 1943 and 1944 when it was again eliminated and included as part of Tayabas's at-large representation for the National Assembly of the Second Philippine Republic.

The district is currently represented by Reynaldo Salvacion of the Lakas–CMD (Lakas).

== List of members representing the district ==
=== Malolos Congress (1898–1901) ===
Seat A					Seat B					Legislature	Constituencies
Portrait	Member (Lifespan)	Term of office	Party	Electoral history	Portrait	Member (Lifespan)	Term of office	Party	Electoral history	Legislature	Constituencies
District created June 18, 1898.
	Ricardo Paras (1861–1938)	September 15, 1898 – March 23, 1901	Nonpartisan	Elected in 1898.		Julio Ruiz	September 15, 1898 – March 23, 1901	Nonpartisan	Appointed by President Emilio Aguinaldo.	Malolos Congress	1898–1901; Boac, Gasan, Mogpog, Santa Cruz, Torrijos
District dissolved into Tayabas's 2nd district for the Philippine Assembly.

=== House of Representatives (1916–1935) ===
Portrait	Member (Lifespan)	Term of office	Party	Legislature	Electoral history	Constituencies
District re-created January 21, 1920.
	Ricardo Nepomuceno	June 6, 1922 – June 2, 1931	Nacionalista Colectivista	6th Legislature	Elected in 1922.	1920–1935; Boac, Buenavista, Gasan, Mogpog, Santa Cruz, Torrijos
	Ricardo Nepomuceno	June 6, 1922 – June 2, 1931	Nacionalista Consolidado	7th Legislature	Re-elected in 1925.	1920–1935; Boac, Buenavista, Gasan, Mogpog, Santa Cruz, Torrijos
	Ricardo Nepomuceno	June 6, 1922 – June 2, 1931	Nacionalista Consolidado	8th Legislature	Re-elected in 1928.	1920–1935; Boac, Buenavista, Gasan, Mogpog, Santa Cruz, Torrijos
	Jose A. Uy	June 2, 1931 – November 15, 1935	Nacionalista Consolidado	9th Legislature	Elected in 1931.	1920–1935; Boac, Buenavista, Gasan, Mogpog, Santa Cruz, Torrijos
	Jose A. Uy	June 2, 1931 – November 15, 1935	Nacionalista Democratico	10th Legislature	Re-elected in 1934.	1920–1935; Boac, Buenavista, Gasan, Mogpog, Santa Cruz, Torrijos

=== 1934 Constitutional Convention (1934–1935) ===
Seat A					Seat B					Legislature	Constituencies
Portrait	Member (Lifespan)	Term of office	Party	Electoral history	Portrait	Member (Lifespan)	Term of office	Party	Electoral history	Legislature	Constituencies
	Ricardo Nepomuceno	July 30, 1934 – February 19, 1935	Nonpartisan	Elected in 1934.		Timoteo Ricohermoso	July 30, 1934 – February 19, 1935	Nonpartisan	Elected in 1934.	1934 Constitutional Convention	1934–1935; Boac, Buenavista, Gasan, Mogpog, Santa Cruz, Torrijos

=== National Assembly (1935–1945) ===
==== Commonwealth ====
Portrait	Member (Lifespan)	Term of office	Party	Legislature	Electoral history	Constituencies
	Cecilio Maneja (1892–1959)	November 15, 1935 – August 31, 1937	Nacionalista Democratico	1st National Assembly	Elected in 1935. Election annulled by electoral commission after an electoral protest.	1935–1941; Boac, Buenavista, Gasan, Mogpog, Santa Cruz, Torrijos
	Jose A. Uy	August 31, 1937 – December 30, 1941	Nacionalista Democratico	1st National Assembly	Declared winner of 1935 elections.	1935–1941; Boac, Buenavista, Gasan, Mogpog, Santa Cruz, Torrijos
	Jose A. Uy	August 31, 1937 – December 30, 1941	Nacionalista	2nd National Assembly	Re-elected in 1938.	1935–1941; Boac, Buenavista, Gasan, Mogpog, Santa Cruz, Torrijos
District dissolved into the two-seat Tayabas's at-large district for the Second Republic National Assembly.

=== House of Representatives (1945–1973) ===
Portrait	Member (Lifespan)	Term of office	Party	Legislature	Electoral history	Constituencies
District re-created May 24, 1945.
	Cecilio Maneja (1892–1959)	June 9, 1945 – May 25, 1946	Nacionalista	1st Commonwealth Congress	Elected in 1941.	1945–1973; Boac, Buenavista, Gasan, Mogpog, Santa Cruz, Torrijos
	Timoteo Ricohermoso	May 25, 1946 – December 30, 1949	Liberal	2nd Commonwealth Congress	Elected in 1946.	1945–1973; Boac, Buenavista, Gasan, Mogpog, Santa Cruz, Torrijos
	Timoteo Ricohermoso	May 25, 1946 – December 30, 1949	Liberal	1st Congress	Elected in 1946.	1945–1973; Boac, Buenavista, Gasan, Mogpog, Santa Cruz, Torrijos
	Panfilo Manguera (1909–1996)	December 30, 1949 – December 30, 1957	Nacionalista	2nd Congress	Elected in 1949.	1945–1973; Boac, Buenavista, Gasan, Mogpog, Santa Cruz, Torrijos
	Panfilo Manguera (1909–1996)	December 30, 1949 – December 30, 1957	Nacionalista	3rd Congress	Re-elected in 1953.	1945–1973; Boac, Buenavista, Gasan, Mogpog, Santa Cruz, Torrijos
	Francisco Lecaroz	December 30, 1957 – January 17, 1973	Nacionalista	4th Congress	Elected in 1957.	1945–1973; Boac, Buenavista, Gasan, Mogpog, Santa Cruz, Torrijos
	Francisco Lecaroz	December 30, 1957 – January 17, 1973	Nacionalista	5th Congress	Re-elected in 1961.	1945–1973; Boac, Buenavista, Gasan, Mogpog, Santa Cruz, Torrijos
	Francisco Lecaroz	December 30, 1957 – January 17, 1973	Liberal	6th Congress	Re-elected in 1965.	1945–1973; Boac, Buenavista, Gasan, Mogpog, Santa Cruz, Torrijos
	Francisco Lecaroz	December 30, 1957 – January 17, 1973	Nacionalista	7th Congress	Re-elected in 1969. Term cut short upon the ratification of a new Constitution.	1945–1973; Boac, Buenavista, Gasan, Mogpog, Santa Cruz, Torrijos
District dissolved into the twenty-seat Region IV-A's at-large district for the Interim Batasang Pambansa.

=== 1971 Constitutional Convention (1971–1972) ===
Seat A					Seat B					Legislature	Constituencies
Portrait	Member (Lifespan)	Term of office	Party	Electoral history	Portrait	Member (Lifespan)	Term of office	Party	Electoral history	Legislature	Constituencies
	Carmencita Reyes (1931–2019)	June 1, 1971 – November 29, 1972	Nonpartisan	Elected in 1970.		Ricardo Nepomuceno Jr. (1931–2006)	June 1, 1971 – November 29, 1972	Nonpartisan	Elected in 1970.	1971 Constitutional Convention	1971–1972; Boac, Buenavista, Gasan, Mogpog, Santa Cruz, Torrijos

=== Batasang Pambansa (1978–1986) ===
Portrait	Member (Lifespan)	Term of office	Party	Legislature	Electoral history	Constituencies
District re-created February 1, 1984.
	Carmencita Reyes (1931–2019)	June 30, 1984 – March 25, 1986	KBL	Regular Batasang Pambansa	Elected in 1984.	1978–1984; Boac, Buenavista, Gasan, Mogpog, Santa Cruz, Torrijos

=== House of Representatives (1987–present) ===
Portrait	Member (Lifespan)	Term of office	Party	Legislature	Electoral history	Constituencies
District re-created February 2, 1987.
	Carmencita Reyes (1931–2019)	June 30, 1987 – June 30, 1998	LABAN	8th Congress	Elected in 1987.	1987–present Boac, Buenavista, Gasan, Mogpog, Santa Cruz, Torrijos
	Carmencita Reyes (1931–2019)	June 30, 1987 – June 30, 1998	LDP	9th Congress	Re-elected in 1992.	1987–present Boac, Buenavista, Gasan, Mogpog, Santa Cruz, Torrijos
	Carmencita Reyes (1931–2019)	June 30, 1987 – June 30, 1998	Lakas	10th Congress	Re-elected in 1995.	1987–present Boac, Buenavista, Gasan, Mogpog, Santa Cruz, Torrijos
	Edmundo Reyes Jr. (born 1962)	June 30, 1998 – June 30, 2007	LAMMP	11th Congress	Elected in 1998.	1987–present Boac, Buenavista, Gasan, Mogpog, Santa Cruz, Torrijos
	Edmundo Reyes Jr. (born 1962)	June 30, 1998 – June 30, 2007	Lakas	12th Congress	Re-elected in 2001.	1987–present Boac, Buenavista, Gasan, Mogpog, Santa Cruz, Torrijos
	Edmundo Reyes Jr. (born 1962)	June 30, 1998 – June 30, 2007	Lakas	13th Congress	Re-elected in 2004.	1987–present Boac, Buenavista, Gasan, Mogpog, Santa Cruz, Torrijos
	Carmencita Reyes (1931–2019)	June 30, 2007 – June 30, 2010	Liberal	14th Congress	Elected in 2007.	1987–present Boac, Buenavista, Gasan, Mogpog, Santa Cruz, Torrijos
	Lord Allan Velasco (born 1977)	June 30, 2010 – June 30, 2013	NUP	15th Congress	Elected in 2010.	1987–present Boac, Buenavista, Gasan, Mogpog, Santa Cruz, Torrijos
	Regina Reyes Mandanas (1964–2022)	June 30, 2010 – January 12, 2016	Liberal	16th Congress	Elected in 2013. Disqualified by the Commission on Elections. Election annulled by the Supreme Court due to foreign citizenship and lack of residency.	1987–present Boac, Buenavista, Gasan, Mogpog, Santa Cruz, Torrijos
Vacant (January 12 – February 1, 2016)				16th Congress	—	1987–present Boac, Buenavista, Gasan, Mogpog, Santa Cruz, Torrijos
	Lord Allan Velasco (born 1977)	February 1, 2016 – June 30, 2025	NUP	16th Congress	Declared winner of 2013 elections.	1987–present Boac, Buenavista, Gasan, Mogpog, Santa Cruz, Torrijos
	Lord Allan Velasco (born 1977)	February 1, 2016 – June 30, 2025	PDP–Laban	17th Congress	Re-elected in 2016.	1987–present Boac, Buenavista, Gasan, Mogpog, Santa Cruz, Torrijos
	Lord Allan Velasco (born 1977)	February 1, 2016 – June 30, 2025	PDP–Laban	18th Congress	Re-elected in 2019.	1987–present Boac, Buenavista, Gasan, Mogpog, Santa Cruz, Torrijos
	Lord Allan Velasco (born 1977)	February 1, 2016 – June 30, 2025	NPC	19th Congress	Re-elected in 2022.	1987–present Boac, Buenavista, Gasan, Mogpog, Santa Cruz, Torrijos
	Reynaldo Salvacion (born 1960)	June 30, 2025 – present	Independent	20th Congress	Elected in 2025.	1987–present Boac, Buenavista, Gasan, Mogpog, Santa Cruz, Torrijos
	Reynaldo Salvacion (born 1960)	June 30, 2025 – present	Lakas	20th Congress	Elected in 2025.	1987–present Boac, Buenavista, Gasan, Mogpog, Santa Cruz, Torrijos

== Election results ==
=== 2010 ===
2010 Philippine House of Representatives election in Marinduque
Party	Candidate	Votes	%
Lakas–Kampi	Lord Allan Velasco	52,407	52.04
Liberal	Edmundo Reyes Jr.	48,300	47.96
Valid ballots		100,707	96.82
Invalid or blank votes		3,306	3.18
Total votes		104,013	100.00
Lakas–Kampi gain from Liberal			

=== 2013 ===
2013 Philippine House of Representatives election in Marinduque
Party	Candidate	Votes	%
Liberal	Regina Reyes Mandanas	52,209	51.90
NUP	Lord Allan Velasco (incumbent)	48,396	48.10
Total votes		100,605	100.00
Liberal gain from NUP			

=== 2016 ===
2016 Philippine House of Representatives election in Marinduque
Party	Candidate	Votes	%
NUP	Lord Allan Velasco	60,585	55.28
Liberal	Regina Reyes Mandanas (incumbent)	49,005	44.72
Total votes		109,590	100.00
NUP gain from Liberal			

=== 2019 ===
2019 Philippine House of Representatives election in Marinduque
Party	Candidate	Votes	%
PDP–Laban	Lord Allan Velasco (incumbent)	95,067	94.54
UNA	Harold Lim	5,488	5.46
Total votes		100,555	100.00
PDP–Laban hold			

=== 2022 ===
2022 Philippine House of Representatives election in Marinduque
Party	Candidate	Votes	%
PDP–Laban	Lord Allan Velasco (incumbent)	98,688	100.00
Total votes		98,688	100.00
PDP–Laban hold			

=== 2025 ===
2025 Philippine House of Representatives election in Marinduque
Party	Candidate	Votes	%
Independent	Reynaldo Salvacion	73,677	56.59
PFP	Presbitero Velasco Jr.	56,527	43.41
Total votes		130,204	100.00
Independent gain from NPC			

== See also ==
- Legislative districts of Marinduque

House of Representatives of the Philippines
Preceded by Taguig–Pateros's 1st congressional district	Home district of the speaker of the House of Representatives; October 12, 2020 – June 30, 2022	Succeeded by Leyte's 1st congressional district
