= Torrijos, Marinduque =

Municipality in Marinduque, Philippines

Torrijos
- Municipality
- Municipality of Torrijos
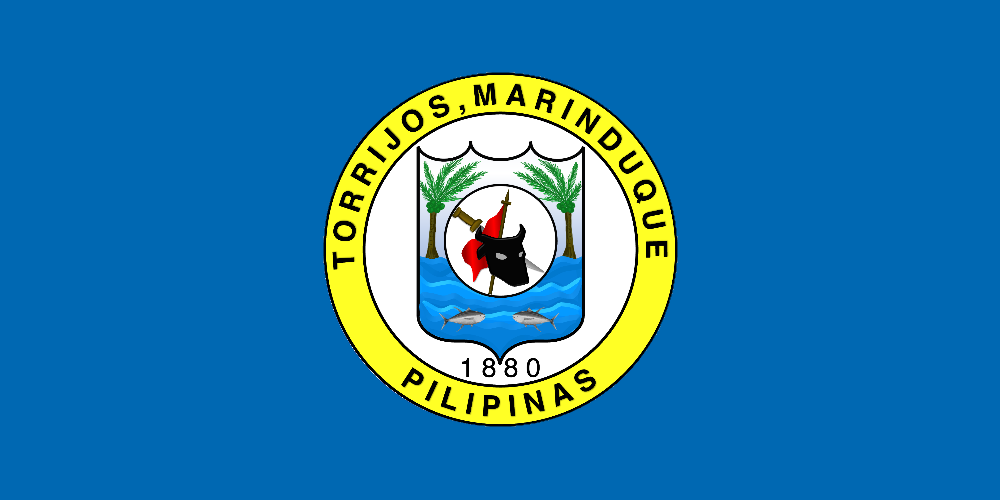
- Flag Seal

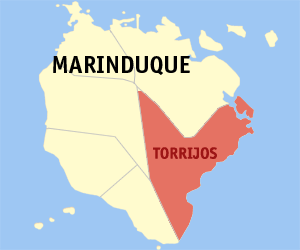
- Map of Marinduque with Torrijos highlighted
- Interactive map of Torrijos
- Location within the Philippines
- Coordinates: 13°19′N 122°05′E
- Country: Philippines
- Region: Mimaropa
- Province: Marinduque
- District: Lone district
- Founded: 1880
- Barangays: 25 (see Barangays)

Government
  - Type: Sangguniang Bayan
  - Mayor: Joey Peñaflor
  - Vice Mayor: Edmar Frias
  - Representative: Reynaldo Salvacion
  - Municipal Council: Members: Joel T. Cruzado; Edmar F. Frias; Romelito R. Fabul; Joel F. Regis; Primo C. Pamintuan; Marife B. Pastrana; Alfredo M. Rosales; Monchita P. Roldan
  - Electorate: 22,396 voters (2025)

Area
  - Total: 178.92 km^{2} (69.08 sq mi)
- Elevation: 77 m (253 ft)
- Highest elevation: 1,174 m (3,852 ft)
- Lowest elevation: 0 m (0 ft)

Population (2024 census)
  - Total: 28,535
  - Density: 159.48/km^{2} (413.06/sq mi)
  - Households: 7,554

Economy
  - Income class: 2nd municipal income class
  - Poverty incidence: 16.36% (2023)
  - Revenue: ₱ 197.7 million (2024)
  - Assets: ₱ 396.3 million (2024)
  - Expenditure: ₱ 201.5 million (2024)
  - Liabilities: ₱ 58.18 million (2024)

Service provider
  - Electricity: Marinduque Electric Cooperative (MARELCO)
- Time zone: UTC+8 (PST)
- ZIP code: 4903
- PSGC: 1704006000
- IDD : area code: +63 (0)42
- Native languages: Tagalog

Torrijos, officially the Municipality of Torrijos (Tagalog: Bayan ng Torrijos), is a municipality in the province of Marinduque, Philippines. According to the 2024 census, it has a population of 28,535 people.

== History ==
The municipality of Torrijos was established on May 25, 1880 through Real Order No. 469. On May 29, 1884, Royal Decree No. 304 was issued, approving its ecclesiastical foundation as a parish from its mother town Santa Cruz.

On September 13, 1900, during the Philippine–American War, forces of the Philippine Revolutionary Army under Colonel Maximo Abad engaged American troops led by Captain Devereux Shields in Torrijos. Abad’s forces defeated the Americans in what is regarded as one of their most significant setbacks during the conflict. The encounter became known as the Battle of Pulang Lupa, named after the mountain where it occurred, whose reddish soil gave rise to the name “Red Mountain.” A monument now marks the site of the battle.

In 1942, the Japanese occupied the town of Torrijos, Marinduque.

In 1945, in the Battle of Marinduque, American and Filipino troops fought in and around the town of Torrijos and Marinduque against the Japanese soldiers during World War II.

== Geography ==
Torrijos is 57 kilometres (35 mi) from Boac.

=== Barangays ===
Torrijos is politically subdivided into 25 barangays. Each barangay consists of puroks and some have sitios.

- Bangwayin
- Bayakbakin
- Bolo
- Bonliw
- Buangan
- Cabuyo
- Cagpo
- Dampulan
- Kay Duke
- Mabuhay
- Makawayan
- Malibago
- Malinao
- Maranlig
- Marlangga
- Matuyatuya
- Nangka
- Pakaskasan
- Payanas
- Poblacion
- Poctoy
- Sibuyao
- Suha
- Talawan
- Tigwi

=== Climate ===
Climate data for Torrijos, Marinduque
Month	Jan	Feb	Mar	Apr	May	Jun	Jul	Aug	Sep	Oct	Nov	Dec	Year
Mean daily maximum °C (°F)	27 (81)	28 (82)	30 (86)	31 (88)	31 (88)	30 (86)	29 (84)	29 (84)	29 (84)	29 (84)	28 (82)	28 (82)	29 (84)
Mean daily minimum °C (°F)	21 (70)	21 (70)	21 (70)	23 (73)	24 (75)	25 (77)	24 (75)	24 (75)	24 (75)	23 (73)	23 (73)	22 (72)	23 (73)
Average precipitation mm (inches)	31 (1.2)	23 (0.9)	25 (1.0)	30 (1.2)	85 (3.3)	145 (5.7)	182 (7.2)	153 (6.0)	172 (6.8)	150 (5.9)	113 (4.4)	68 (2.7)	1,177 (46.3)
Average rainy days	11.3	8.5	9.7	11.3	18.3	23.2	26.6	25.4	25.9	24.2	19.7	15.2	219.3
Source: Meteoblue

== Demographics ==
Population census of Torrijos
Year	Pop.	±% p.a.
1903	4,275	—
1918	4,933	+0.96%
1939	8,974	+2.89%
1948	10,697	+1.97%
1960	14,885	+2.79%
1970	18,137	+1.99%
1975	20,762	+2.75%
1980	22,255	+1.40%
1990	25,496	+1.37%
1995	25,807	+0.23%
2000	28,000	+1.76%
2007	29,360	+0.66%
2010	29,366	+0.01%
2015	30,524	+0.74%
2020	30,476	−0.03%
2024	28,535	−1.57%
Source: Philippine Statistics Authority

In the 2020 census, the population of Torrijos was 28,535 people, with a density of 160 inhabitants per square kilometre or 410 inhabitants per square mile.

== Economy ==
Poverty incidence of Torrijos (%)

Source: Philippine Statistics Authority

== Transportation ==
Access to the municipality:

- Via sea - Balanacan Port Mogpog (ferry coming from Lucena, ro/ro and fastcrafts)
- Via air - Marinduque Airport-(Cebu Pacific Operated by Cebgo) Manila-Marinduque Flight Starts Operation on April 1, 2019

== Education ==
The Torrijos Schools District Office governs all educational institutions within the municipality. It oversees the management and operations of all private and public schools, from primary to secondary.

=== Primary and elementary schools ===
- Bangwayin Primary School
- Banukbok Primary School
- Bayakbakin Primary School
- Bolo Primary School
- Bonliw Elementary School
- Buangan Elementary School
- Cabuyo Elementary School
- Cagpo Primary School
- Dampulan Elementary School
- Kay Duke Primary School
- Mabuhay Primary School
- Makawayan Elementary School
- Malibago Elementary School
- Malinao Primary School
- Maranlig Elementary School
- Marlangga Elementary School
- Matuyatuya Elementary School
- Nangka Elementary School
- Pakaskasan Elementary School
- Payanas Elementary School
- Poctoy Elementary School
- Sibuyao Elementary School
- Sinambahan Primary School
- Suha Elementary School
- Talawan Elementary School
- Tigwi Elementary School
- Torrijos Central School

=== Secondary schools ===
- Bonliw National High School
- Malibago National High School
- Maranlig National High School
- Matuyatuya National High School
- Poctoy National High School
- Sibuyao National High School
- Tigwi National High School
- Our Mother of Perpetual Succor Academy

=== Higher educational institutions ===
- Marinduque State University
- Torrijos Poblacion School of Arts and Trades (TPSAT)

== Tourism ==
- Torrijos White Beach (also known as Poctoy White Beach Resort, Barangay Poctoy)
- Battle of Pulang Lupa Monument (Barangay Bolo)
- Ka Amon Cave (Barangay Bonliw)
- Freedom Park (also known as Luneta Park, Barangay Poblacion)
- Sibuyao Farms
- Bonliw Loom Weaving (Barangay Bonliw)
- Tabag Cliff and River (Barangay Malibago)
