= Gasan, Marinduque =

Municipality in Marinduque, Philippines

Gasan
- Municipality
- Municipality of Gasan
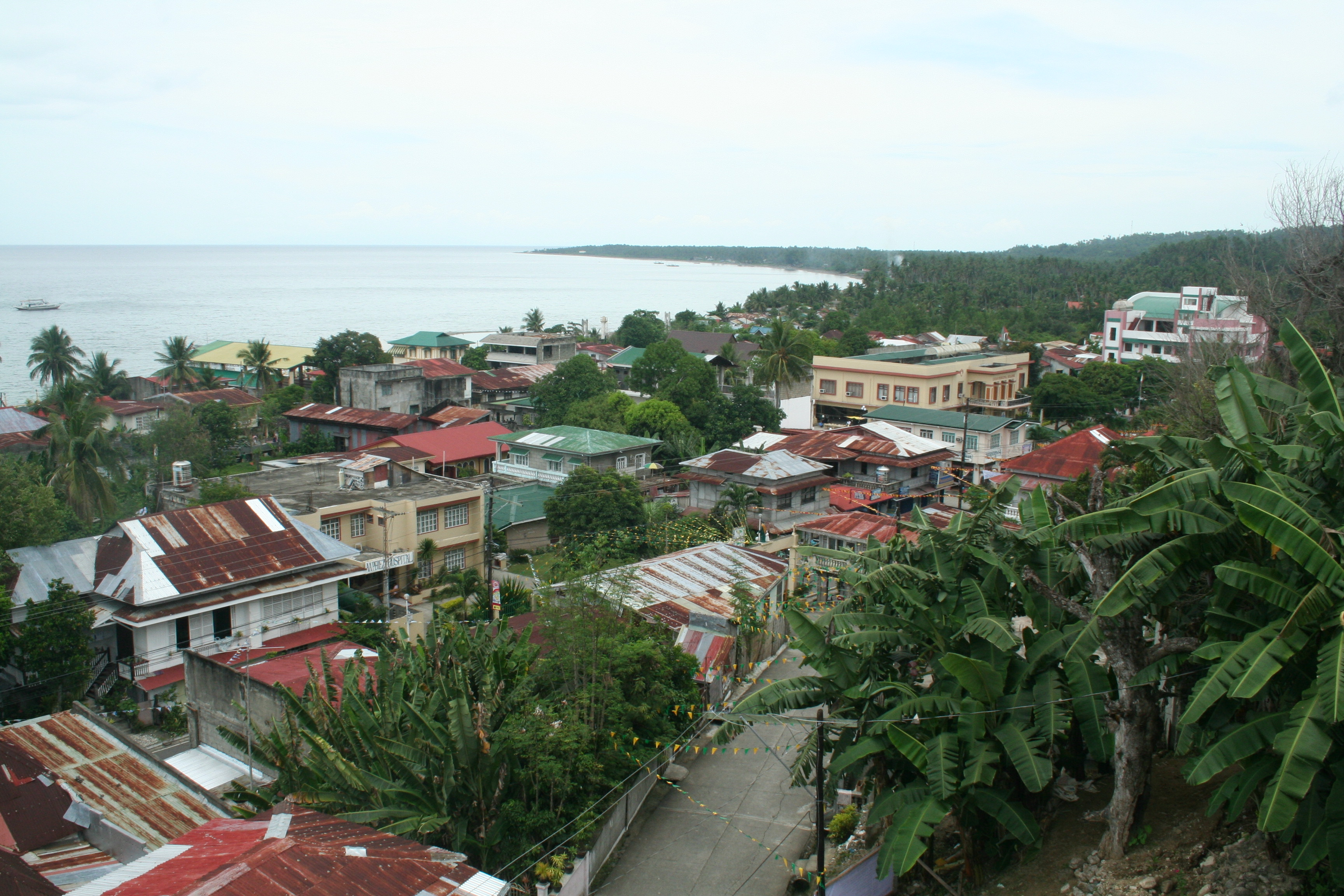
- Skyline of Gasan from St. Joseph the Worker Parish

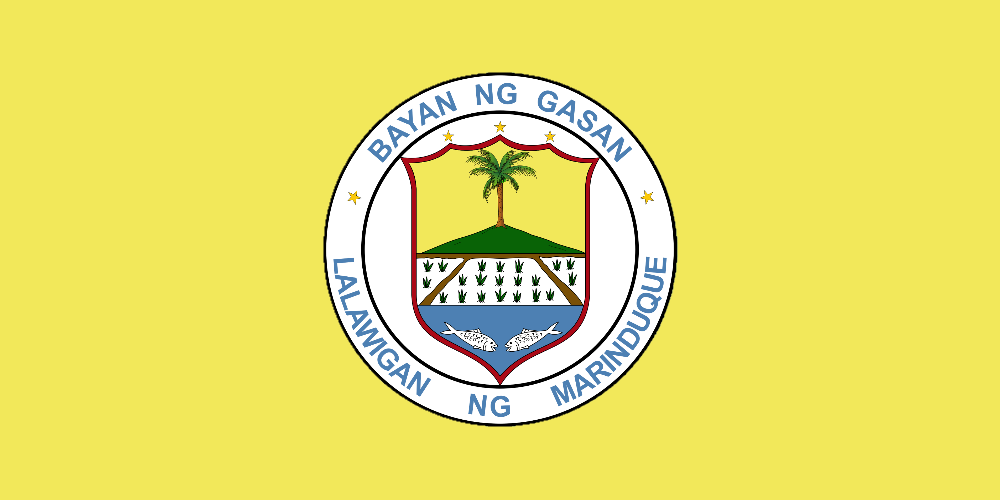
- Flag Seal
- Nicknames: Cultural Nerve Center of Marinduque; Crafts Capital of Marinduque
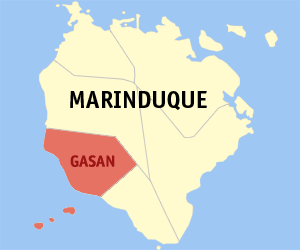
- Map of Marinduque with Gasan highlighted
- Interactive map of Gasan
- Location within the Philippines
- Coordinates: 13°19′N 121°51′E
- Country: Philippines
- Region: Mimaropa
- Province: Marinduque
- District: Lone district
- Founded: 1609
- Barangays: 25 (see Barangays)

Government
  - Type: Sangguniang Bayan
  - Mayor: James Marty L. Lim
  - Vice Mayor: Lidany A. Baldo
  - Representative: Reynaldo Salvacion
  - Municipal Council: Members: Lidany Arevalo L. Baldo; Dunne Melton S. Motol; Petronila H. Quilendrino; Ricardo F. Macunat; Joy Raymond D. Isidro; Baltazar C. Rey Jr.; Noel M. Laurel; Servillano M. Balitaan
  - Electorate: 24,545 voters (2025)

Area
  - Total: 100.88 km^{2} (38.95 sq mi)
- Elevation: 9.2 m (30 ft)
- Highest elevation: 819 m (2,687 ft)
- Lowest elevation: 0 m (0 ft)

Population (2024 census)
  - Total: 35,315
  - Density: 350.07/km^{2} (906.68/sq mi)
  - Households: 2,636
- Demonym: Gaseños

Economy
  - Income class: 2nd municipal income class
  - Poverty incidence: 13.85% (2023)
  - Revenue: ₱ 200.1 million (2024)
  - Assets: ₱ 683.5 million (2024)
  - Expenditure: ₱ 169.5 million (2024)
  - Liabilities: ₱ 125.3 million (2024)

Service provider
  - Electricity: Marinduque Electric Cooperative (MARELCO)
- Time zone: UTC+8 (PST)
- ZIP code: 4905
- PSGC: 1704003000
- IDD : area code: +63 (0)42
- Native languages: Tagalog

Gasan, officially the Municipality of Gasan (Tagalog: Bayan ng Gasan), is a municipality in the province of Marinduque, Philippines. According to the 2024 census, it has a population of 35,315 people.

== Etymology ==
The name Gasan is believed to have originated from the term Gasang or Gasang-gasang, referring to a type of coral that was once abundant along the town’s shoreline.

According to legend, when the Spaniards arrived, they encountered an elderly woman near the banks of what is now the Matandang Gasan River. When asked in Spanish for the name of the place, she misunderstood the question and instead referred to the corals found in the area. The Spaniards interpreted her response as the name of the settlement. Over time, Gasang-gasang was shortened to Gasang, and eventually evolved into Gasan.

== History ==
The 1818 Spanish census recorded Gasan to contain 316 native families and 1 Spanish-Filipino family.

In 1942, during World War II, the Japanese Imperial forces landed in Gasan, Marinduque.

In 1945, the combined United States and Allied Philippine Commonwealth forces landed in Gasan, Marinduque. The 5th Infantry Division of the Philippine Commonwealth Army participated in the battle against the Japanese forces, during which hundreds of Japanese troops were taken prisoner at the town of Gasan, Marinduque. This became known as the Battle of Marinduque.

In 1957, barrio Banto-anin was renamed as Bukal and barrio Hinubuan was renamed as Antipolo.

== Geography ==
The municipality is bounded by the provincial capital, Boac, to the north and east, by Buenavista to the southeast and by the Sibuyan Sea to the south and west. It is the second-oldest municipality in Marinduque, after Boac. Residents of Gasan are called Gaseños. Gasan is 16 kilometres (9.9 mi) from Boac.

The Tres Reyes Islands off the coast of Marinduque are under the jurisdiction of Gasan, part of the municipality's Barangay Pinggan.

=== Barangays ===
Gasan is politically subdivided into 25 barangays. Each barangay consists of puroks and some have sitios.

- Antipolo
- Bachao Ibaba
- Bachao Ilaya
- Bacong-Bacong
- Bahi
- Bangbang
- Banot
- Banuyo
- Bognuyan
- Cabugao
- Dawis
- Dili
- Libtangin
- Mahunig
- Mangiliol
- Masiga
- Matandang Gasan
- Pangi
- Pinggan
- Tabionan
- Tapuyan
- Tiguion
- Barangay I (Poblacion)
- Barangay II (Poblacion)
- Barangay III (Poblacion)

All barangays in Gasan are bounded in part by coastline, except the mountainous barangays of Bachao Ilaya, Cabugao, Dawis, Mangiliol, Matandang Gasan, Tabionan, Tapuyan, and Tiguion, though Barangay Dawis is claiming that the coastline of Bukana, which is now controlled by Pinggan, belongs to them as well as the place itself.

=== Climate ===
Climate data for Gasan, Marinduque
Month	Jan	Feb	Mar	Apr	May	Jun	Jul	Aug	Sep	Oct	Nov	Dec	Year
Mean daily maximum °C (°F)	26 (79)	27 (81)	29 (84)	31 (88)	30 (86)	30 (86)	29 (84)	29 (84)	29 (84)	29 (84)	28 (82)	26 (79)	29 (83)
Mean daily minimum °C (°F)	22 (72)	22 (72)	22 (72)	23 (73)	24 (75)	24 (75)	24 (75)	24 (75)	24 (75)	24 (75)	23 (73)	23 (73)	23 (74)
Average precipitation mm (inches)	83 (3.3)	55 (2.2)	44 (1.7)	37 (1.5)	90 (3.5)	123 (4.8)	145 (5.7)	125 (4.9)	135 (5.3)	166 (6.5)	163 (6.4)	152 (6.0)	1,318 (51.8)
Average rainy days	15.1	10.8	11.9	11.4	19.9	23.7	26.3	23.9	23.9	22.1	20.2	18.6	227.8
Source: Meteoblue

== Demographics ==
Population census of Gasan
Year	Pop.	±% p.a.
1903	8,270	—
1918	10,771	+1.78%
1939	10,794	+0.01%
1948	10,052	−0.79%
1960	14,508	+3.10%
1970	19,827	+3.17%
1975	20,596	+0.77%
1980	23,185	+2.40%
1990	25,236	+0.85%
1995	26,944	+1.23%
2000	29,799	+2.18%
2007	33,772	+1.74%
2010	33,402	−0.40%
2015	34,828	+0.80%
2020	36,197	+0.81%
2024	35,315	−0.59%
Source: Philippine Statistics Authority

In the 2024 census, the population of Gasan was 35,315 people, with a density of 350 inhabitants per square kilometre or 910 inhabitants per square mile.

=== Religion ===
- Catholic Church (Latin Rite)
- Philippine Independent Church
- Various Protestant groups

== Economy ==
Poverty incidence of Gasan (%)

Source: Philippine Statistics Authority

== Transportation ==
The Marinduque Ring Road passes through Gasan and is known as San Jose Street in downtown Gasan. Tricycles and jeepneys can be used to navigate the town, while jeepneys can also be used to go to other towns. Taxis are available to and from major transportation terminals. Buses also stop in downtown Gasan to go to Lucena City and further on to Metro Manila. Many roads are paved.

Marinduque Airport, the island's only airport, is located in Barangay Masiga. Zest Air (now AirAsia Zest) was the first airline to resume scheduled flights to Marinduque in 2008 after its closure for four consecutive years.

== Tourism ==
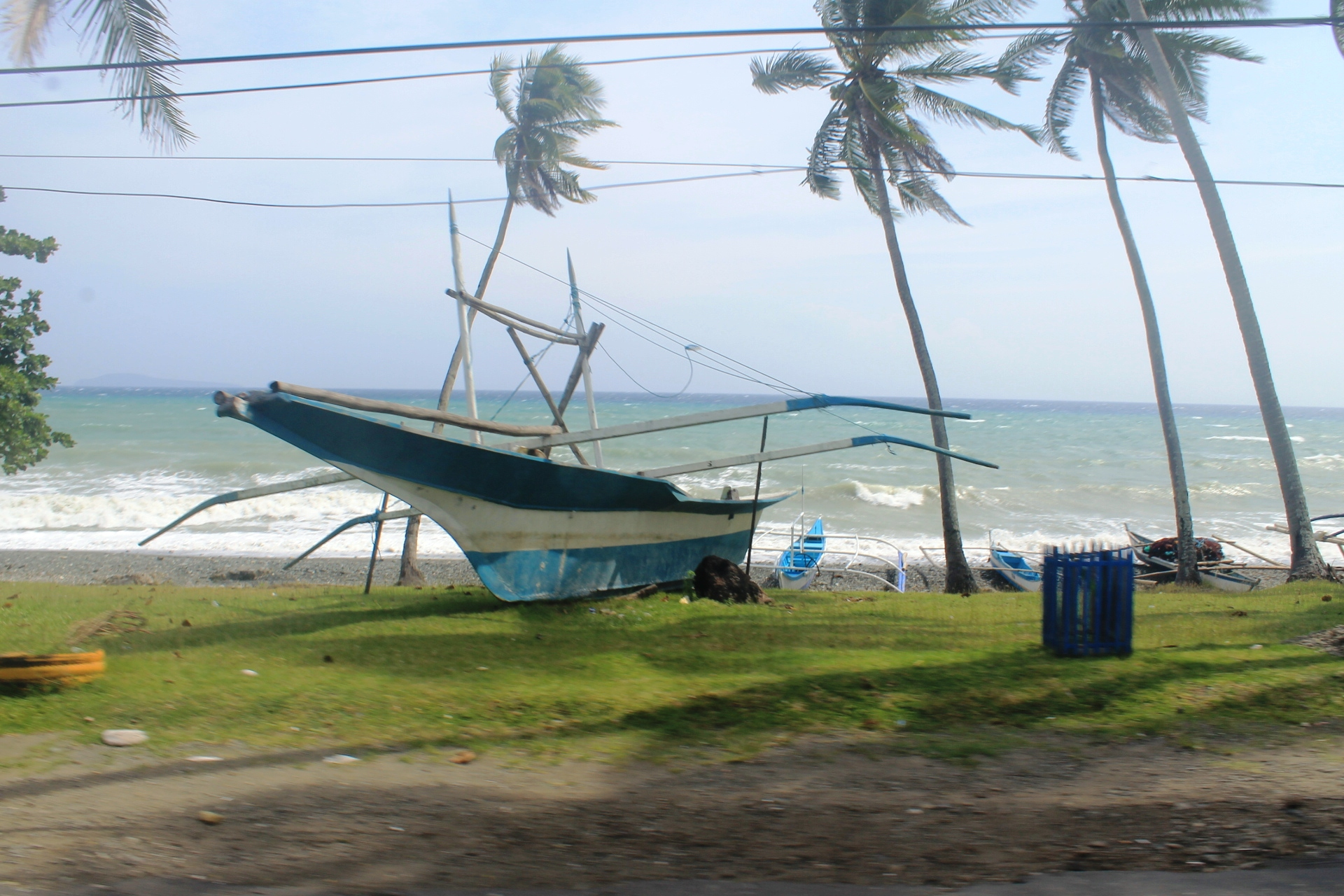
Banca at the seashore, Gasan

Gasan is home to some of Marinduque's best-known tourist spots:

- Guingona Park: This park located in Barangay Uno is where Gasan's cenaculos are played during the Moriones Festival.
- Reyes Park: Reyes Park in Barangay Dos serves as the Gasan boardwalk. This park is about to demolish as the present administration under Victoria Lao Lim pursue her intention of building a Commercial Sports Complex that according to her may generate funds for GASUAF. Fairs are conducted in the park, and a wooden footbridge leading to nearby Barangay Dili can be seen (and crossed). The bridge is a landmark of Barangay Dili.
- Talao Cave: Talao Cave in Barangay Tiguion is a series of twelve caves accessible from three mountain trails that can only be crossed on foot. The caves are located in the midst of a rain forest.
- Tres Reyes Islands: The Tres Reyes Islands in Barangay Pinggan, named after the Three Kings of the Nativity, are a potential tourist destination. True to its name, the island chain consists of three islands named Gaspar, Melchor and Baltazar and are visible from any point of the Gasan coastline. Reaching the islands takes about 30–45 minutes by boat.

=== Barangay landmarks ===
In a recent tourist campaign known as "Parine na bayâ!", the municipal government promoted individual barangays' products and landmarks in a bid to showcase Gasan as a tourist destination. Some include the following:

- Antipolo: Fish products
- Bachao Ibaba and Bachao Ilaya: Wooden handicrafts
- Bacong-Bacong: Watermelons
- Bangbang: Wicker handicrafts
- Banot: Banot Beach Park
- Bognuyan: Fish
- Cabugao: Gemilina plantation
- Dili: Wooden footbridge
- Libtangin: Open-air tiangge
- Mahunig: Gasan Cemetery
- Mangiliol: Arrowroot
- Masiga: Patis
- Pangi: Butterfly farm
- Pinggan: Tres Reyes Islands
- Tabionan: Tabionan River
- Tapuyan: Nito
- Tiguion: Talao Cave
- Dawis: Pamaypay, Pastilyas

== Culture ==
=== Festivals ===
There are three main festivals celebrated in Gasan, two of which are unique to the municipality:

- Araw ng Gasan: The Araw ng Gasan commemorates the town's founding nearly 400 years ago as a Spanish pueblo by Father Juan Rosado in honor of Saint Bernard of Marinduque.
- Gasang-Gasang Festival: The Gasang-Gasang Festival celebrates the origins of the name "Gasan". Sponsored by the Gasan Culture and Arts Foundation (GASCUAF)with a certain contributions from 25 Barangays coming from their Barangay Budget, and held after the Moriones Festival, the festival features a live dance competition where several barangays have competed in the competition held in downtown Gasan. In 2006, however, the festival was held instead at the open-air tiangge area of Barangay Libtangin due to objections from the mayor over the festival being held downtown.
- Moriones Festival: Like all other municipalities in Marinduque, Gasan celebrates the Moriones Festival during the Holy Week. A parade of "morions", or Roman soldiers, is conducted in downtown Gasan, as well as the Gasan cenaculo at Guingona Park on Good Friday.

== Education ==
=== Primary and elementary schools ===
- Antipolo Elementary School
- Bachao Elementary School
- Bacongbacong Elementary School
- Bahi Elementary School
- Bangbang Elementary School
- Banot-Mahunig Elementary School
- Banuyo Elementary School
- Bognuyan Elementary School
- Cabugao Elementary School
- Dawis Elementary School
- Gasan Central School
- Gaspar Elementary School
- Libtangin Public School
- Mangiliol Elementary School
- Masiga Elementary School
- Matandang Gasan Public School
- Pangi Elementary School
- Pinggan Elementary School
- Quatiz Elementary School
- Tabionan Elementary School
- Talao Elementary School
- Tapuyan Elementary School
- Tiguion Elementary School

=== Secondary schools ===
- Bangbang National High School
- Bognuyan National High School
- Paciano A. Sena Memorial High School
- Tapuyan National High School
- Tiguion National High School
- Marinduque Christian Academy
- Marinduque Midwest College (High School Department)
- Marinduque Technical and Vocational Institute Inc.

=== Higher educational institutions ===
- Marinduque Midwest College
- Marinduque State University - College of Fisheries

== Notable personalities ==
- Michael Sager - Filipino-Canadian actor, model, dancer, singer, and television presenter.
