= Buenavista, Marinduque =

Municipality in Marinduque, Philippines

Buenavista
- Municipality
- Municipality of Buenavista
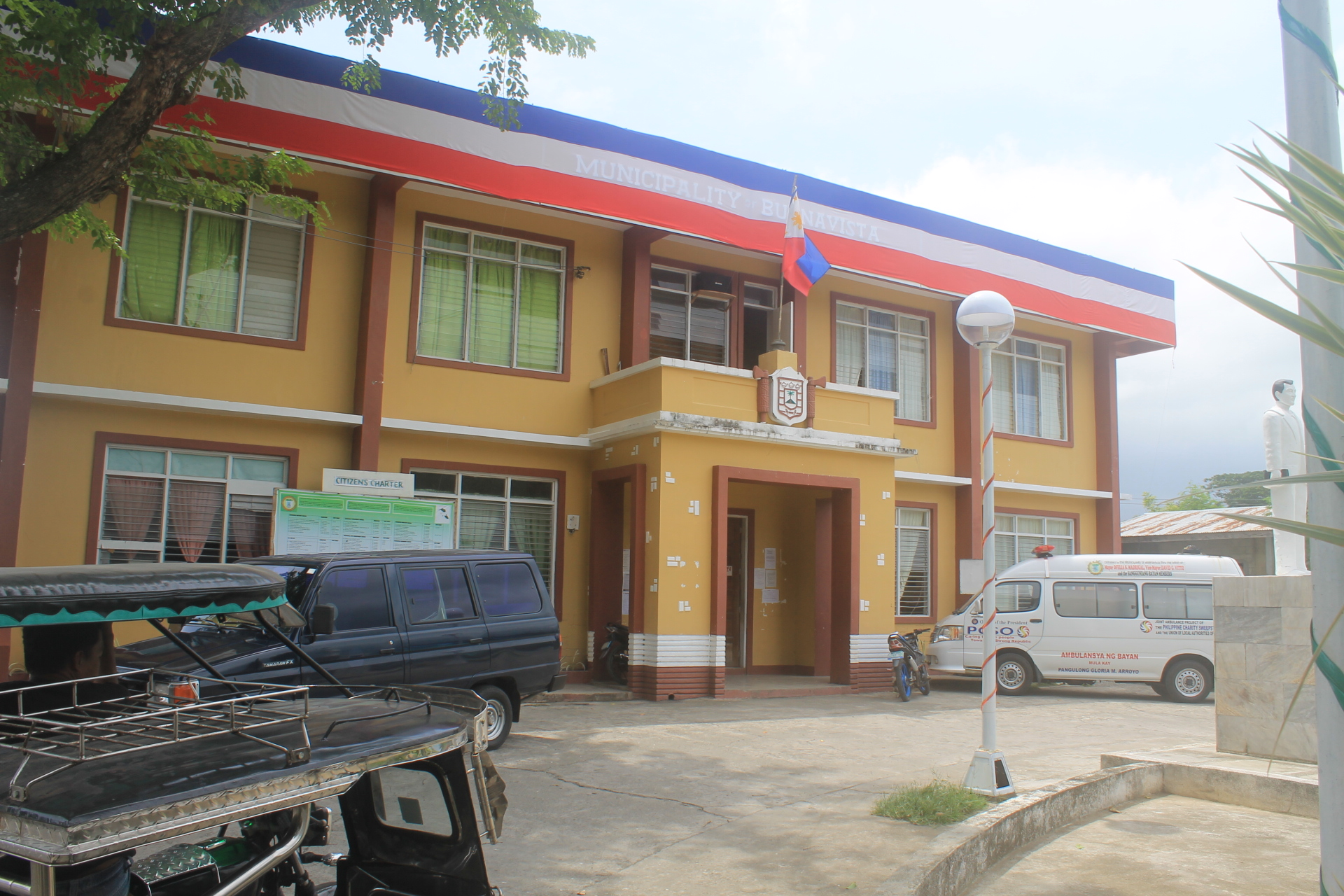
- Municipal Hall

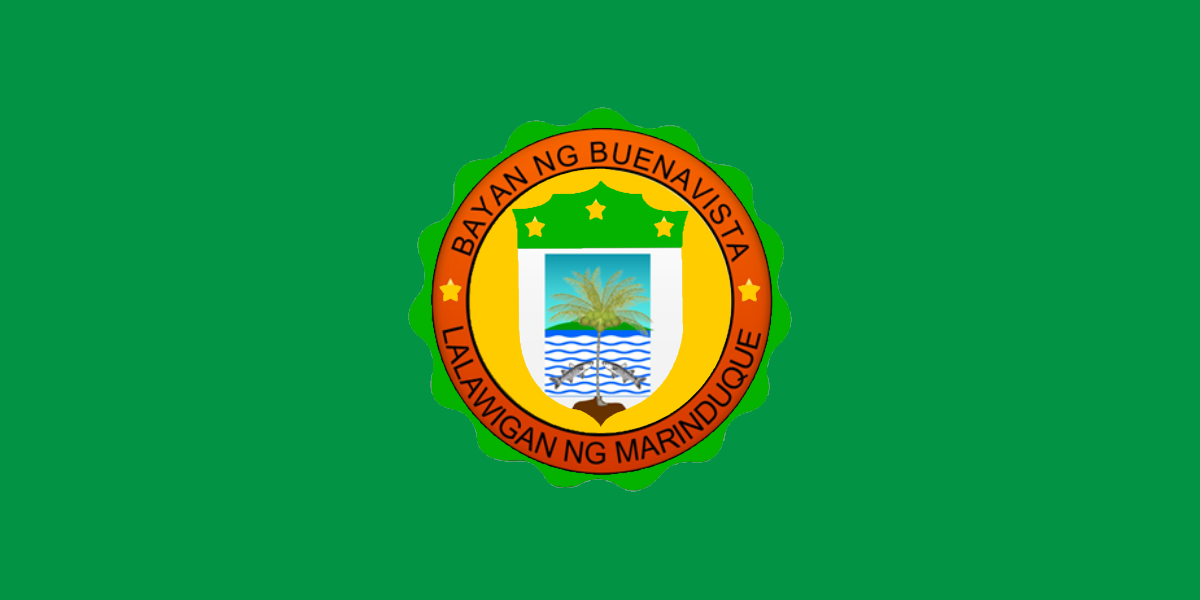
- Flag Seal
- Nickname: Malindig Country
- Interactive map of Buenavista
- Location within the Philippines
- Coordinates: 13°15′N 121°57′E
- Country: Philippines
- Region: Mimaropa
- Province: Marinduque
- District: Lone district
- Founded: November 9, 1918
- Barangays: 15 (see Barangays)

Government
  - Type: Sangguniang Bayan
  - Mayor: Eduard L. Siena
  - Vice Mayor: David G. Vitto
  - Representative: Reynaldo Salvacion
  - Municipal Council: Members: Rommel E. Millar; Herminigildo L. Malapote Jr.; Renato S. Madrigal Jr.; Eduardo L. Pampola; Joseph C. Ogalinola; Edgar R. Perlas; Luzviminda G. Salvacion
  - Electorate: 16,531 voters (2025)

Area
  - Total: 81.25 km^{2} (31.37 sq mi)
- Elevation: 65 m (213 ft)
- Highest elevation: 1,174 m (3,852 ft)
- Lowest elevation: 0 m (0 ft)

Population (2024 census)
  - Total: 24,136
  - Density: 297.1/km^{2} (769.4/sq mi)
  - Households: 6,258

Economy
  - Income class: 4th municipal income class
  - Poverty incidence: 25.89% (2023)
  - Revenue: ₱ 136.7 million (2024)
  - Assets: ₱ 45.06 million (2024)
  - Expenditure: ₱ 125.3 million (2024)
  - Liabilities: ₱ 85.01 million (2024)

Service provider
  - Electricity: Marinduque Electric Cooperative (MARELCO)
- Time zone: UTC+8 (PST)
- ZIP code: 4904
- PSGC: 1704002000
- IDD : area code: +63 (0)42
- Native languages: Tagalog

Buenavista, officially the Municipality of Buenavista (Tagalog: Bayan ng Buenavista), is a municipality in the province of Marinduque, Philippines. According to the 2024 census, it has a population of 24,136 people, making it the least populated municipality in the province.

== Etymology ==
The town was named "Buenavista" by Don Cornelio Sadiua, referring to its "good view". It was formerly known as Sabang, after the river that runs through the area. Many of the town’s residents trace their ancestry to the family of Don Cornelio Sadiua.

== History ==
In 1942, the Japanese Imperial forces landed in Buenavista at Patay Ilog before making their way to the capital. Due to its rugged terrain, relative isolation, and fierce pro-American sentiment, Buenavista was the headquarters for the resistance movement. Japanese forces and the Resistance and guerrillas frequently engaged in skirmishes within the town borders. Occupying Japanese forces burned the school and municipal building, after holding captives composed a member from each Buenavista family. Guerrilla forces eventually re-captured the town.

The 'Libas Ambush, known locally as Pinag Labanan, was a joint guerrilla-Buenavistan effort in which Filipino guerrillas and Buenavistans ambushed and killed a troop of Japanese soldiers. After which the Japanese commandant issued a proclamation that for 1 Japanese soldier killed by the Filipinos in Buenavista, 10 Filipinos will die within a 5-mile radius.

In spite of the Japanese threats the Buenavistans continued their fight against Japanese occupation throughout the war, including rescuing and hiding several the combined Filipino and American military personnel during the war. One such rescue occurred shortly after the fall of Bataan, when the lighthouse keeper found an American seaman hiding among the shoreline rocks. These rescued Filipinos and Americans were clothed, fed and hidden by the Buenavistans, even though they risked execution if the Japanese found out about it.

In 1945, the combined U.S. and Allied Philippine Commonwealth military forces landed at Caigangan beach in Buenavista and attacked from the Japanese Imperial forces in the Battle of Marinduque. The Buenavista Campaign was the first major offensive fought during the Battle of Marinduque. It culminated in a bloody firefight between the Japanese and a joint Allied- Filipino guerrilla offensive. The Japanese, who were headquartered in the Municipal building and elementary school, were soundly defeated.

Buenavista was chosen as the headquarters of the 5th Infantry Division of the Philippine Commonwealth Army and the U.S. Army Signal Corps due to their record of anti-Japanese actions during the war. The U.S. Army Signal Corps and the 5th Infantry Division of the Philippine Commonwealth Army were quartered in Pablo Pe's bodega in the town.

The longest-serving mayor was Recaredo Sarmiento. His term was interrupted during World War II. The first Chinese-Filipino mayor was Wilfredo Sadiua Pe.

== Geography ==
Buenavista is 30 kilometres (19 mi) from Boac.

=== Barangays ===
Buenavista is politically subdivided into 15 barangays. Each barangay consists of puroks and some have sitios.

- Bagacay
- Bagtingon
- Barangay I (Poblacion)
- Barangay II (Poblacion)
- Barangay III (Poblacion)
- Barangay IV (Poblacion)
- Bicas-bicas
- Caigangan
- Daykitin
- Libas
- Malbog
- Sihi
- Timbo (Sanggulong)
- Tungib-Lipata
- Yook

=== Climate ===
Climate data for Buenavista, Marinduque
Month	Jan	Feb	Mar	Apr	May	Jun	Jul	Aug	Sep	Oct	Nov	Dec	Year
Mean daily maximum °C (°F)	26 (79)	28 (82)	29 (84)	31 (88)	31 (88)	30 (86)	29 (84)	29 (84)	29 (84)	29 (84)	28 (82)	27 (81)	29 (84)
Mean daily minimum °C (°F)	22 (72)	22 (72)	22 (72)	23 (73)	25 (77)	25 (77)	25 (77)	25 (77)	25 (77)	24 (75)	23 (73)	23 (73)	24 (75)
Average precipitation mm (inches)	115 (4.5)	66 (2.6)	55 (2.2)	39 (1.5)	164 (6.5)	282 (11.1)	326 (12.8)	317 (12.5)	318 (12.5)	192 (7.6)	119 (4.7)	173 (6.8)	2,166 (85.3)
Average rainy days	13.6	9.4	10.4	10.5	21.1	26.0	29.0	27.6	27.5	23.1	16.7	16.1	231
Source: Meteoblue

== Demographics ==
Population census of Buenavista
Year	Pop.	±% p.a.
1939	4,354	—
1948	5,040	+1.64%
1960	7,303	+3.14%
1970	10,463	+3.66%
1975	11,787	+2.42%
1980	13,025	+2.02%
1990	15,495	+1.75%
1995	17,358	+2.15%
2000	19,271	+2.27%
2007	21,018	+1.20%
2010	23,111	+3.51%
2015	23,988	+0.71%
2020	26,043	+1.75%
2024	24,136	−1.81%
Source: Philippine Statistics Authority

In the 2024 census, the population of Buenavista was 24,136 people, with a density of 300 inhabitants per square kilometre or 780 inhabitants per square mile.

== Economy ==
Poverty incidence of Buenavista (%)

Source: Philippine Statistics Authority

Locally crafted products include:

- Kalamay-hati: A type of coconut jam made from coconut cream and sugar or molasses
- Maja blanca: A type of coconut pudding
- Suman: A dessert/snack made of sticky rice and coconut steamed in leaves.
- Puto: A steamed rice cake.
- Bagoong: A traditional fish paste made using fresh local/sustainable ingredients.

== Tourism ==
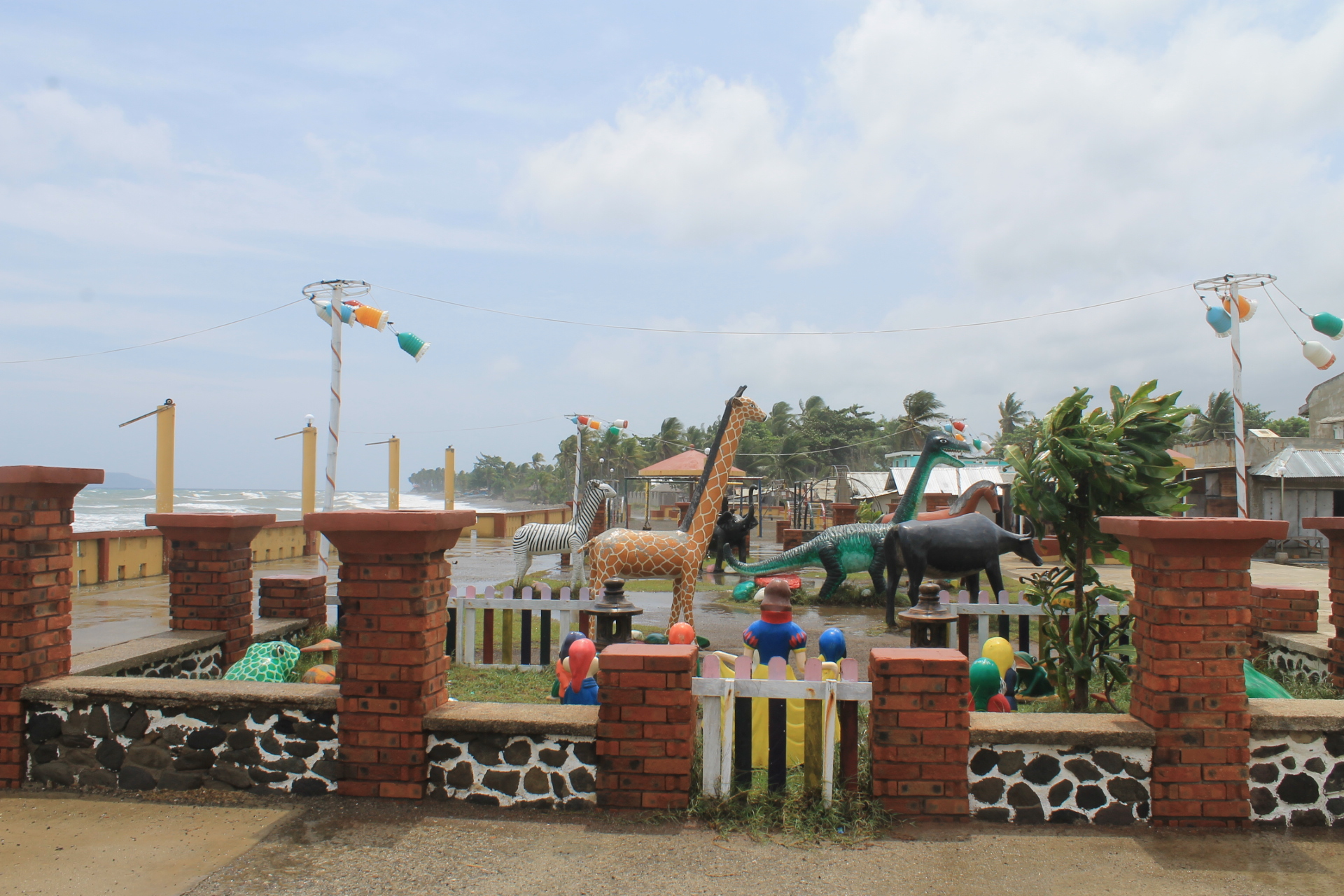
Buenavista Town Park

- The Palengke Seaside Cultural Arts and Entertainment Pavilion: A local gathering place for Buenavista events, parties, and exhibitions.
- Malbog Hot Springs: Located in the Malbog district. These are hot sulfur springs, heated by the volcanic Mount Malindig. They reputedly have therapeutic and healing properties.
- Elephant Island (previously Isla Perro): Located off the coast of Buenavista in the shadow of Malindig. In the 1970s the island was for sale at a price of 3000 pesos. In 2009, Bellarocca Island Resort and Spa opened in this island.
- Inuman Bato (Drinking Rock): Located in Suk'an district. It is a tidal pool on the beach that is submerged in the sea during high tide. At low tide, the pool is filled with drinkable, fresh water. It was reportedly featured in the popular "Ripley's Believe It or Not!" newspaper serial during the 1950s.
- Pablo Pe's Bodega: Located on Don Cornelio Street, next to the Pe House. This humble structure served as the headquarters of the United States Army Signal Corps during the Liberation.

=== Events ===
- Santo Nino Festival: A four-day festival of food, fun and family-friendly activities and events. It is held annually in January.
- Flores de Mayo: This celebration is held yearly from May 1 through May 31. It is in honor of the Blessed Virgin Mary. The children of Buenavista give gifts of bouquets and wreaths of native flowers to the Blessed Virgin.

== Government ==
=== List of former local chief executives ===
- Agaton Sarmiento: 1918–1925
- Ciriaco Arevalo: 1925–1931
- Vitaliano Salvacion: 1931–1934
- Cesar Nepomuceno: 1934–1937
- Jose Salvacion: 1934–1941
- Teofisto Jamolin: 1941–1944
- Jose Sarmiento: 1944–1945
- Jose Salvacion: 1945–1946
- Recaredo Sarmiento: 1946–1947
- Recaredo Sarmiento: 1947–1956
- Vitaliano Salvacion: 1956–1958
- Josefina Sadiwa: 1958–1959
- Claudio Mabunga: 1959–1967
- Wilfredo S. Pe: 1967–1972
- Wilfredo S. Pe: 1972–1980
- Renato S. Madrigal: 1980
- Ofelia S. Madrigal (OIC): 1980–1988
- Ofelia S. Madrigal: 1988–1992
- Wilfredo S. Pe: 1992–1995
- Ofelias S. Madrigal: 1995
- Russel S. Madrigal: [data missing]
- Nancy C. Madrigal: 2022
- Eduard L. Siena: Present

== Education ==
The Buenavista Schools District Office governs all educational institutions within the municipality. It oversees the management and operations of all private and public, from primary to secondary schools.

=== Primary and elementary schools ===
- Bagacay Elementary School
- Bagtingon Elementary School
- Bancoro Public School
- Bicas-Bicas Elementary School
- Binunga Public School
- Buenavista Central School
- Caigangan Elementary School
- Daat Public School
- Daykitin Elementary School
- Good Shepherd Diocesan School
- Holy Child Jesus Parochial School
- Libas Elementary School
- Lipata Elementary School
- Malbog Elementary School
- Pag-Asa Elementary School
- Sihi Elementary School
- Timbo Elementary School
- Tungib Elementary School
- Yook Elementary School

=== Secondary schools ===
- Buenavista National High School
- Buenavista National High School - Bagacay Annex
- Buenavista National High School - Daykitin Annex
- Buenavista National High School - Lipata-Tungib Annex
- Buenavista National High School - Sihi Annex
- Yook National High School

=== Higher educational institution ===
- Marinduque Victorians College
