= 2025 Marinduque local elections =

Local elections in the Philippines

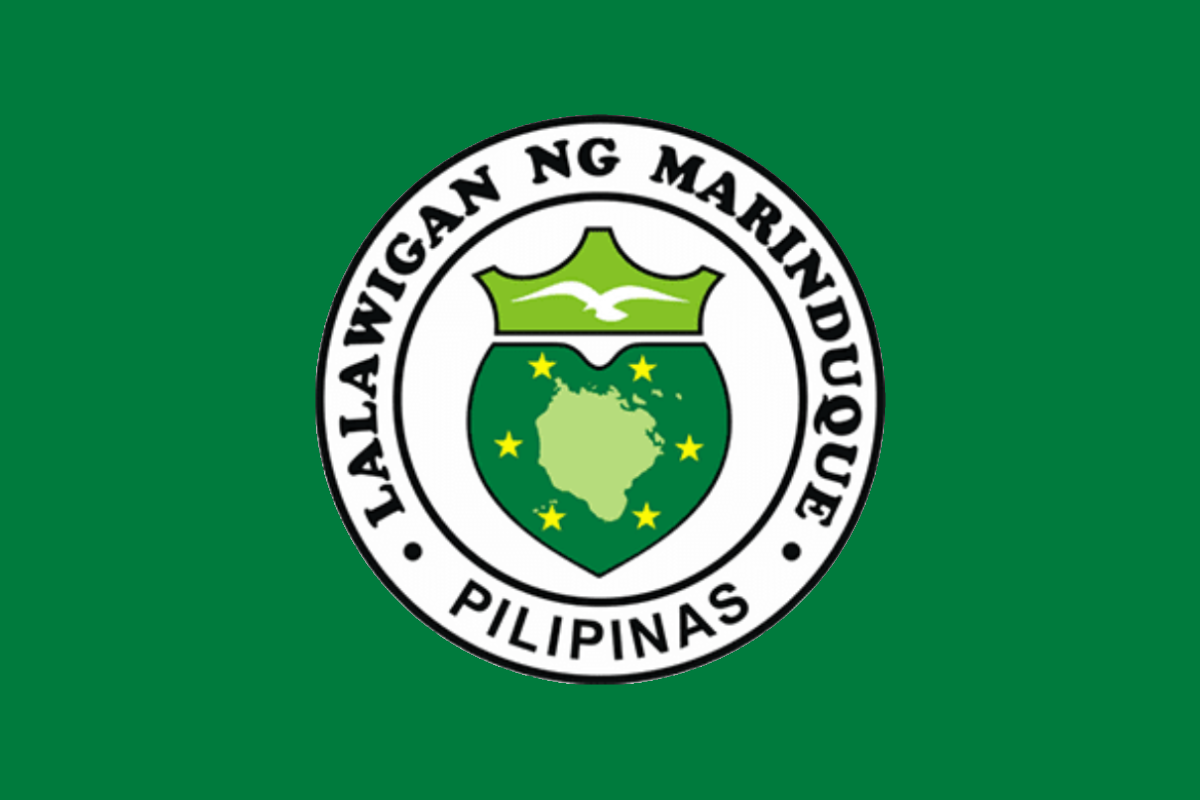
- May 12, 2025
- Registered: 165,729 ▲2.53%
- Turnout: 79.55% (▼7.53 pp)
- Gubernatorial election
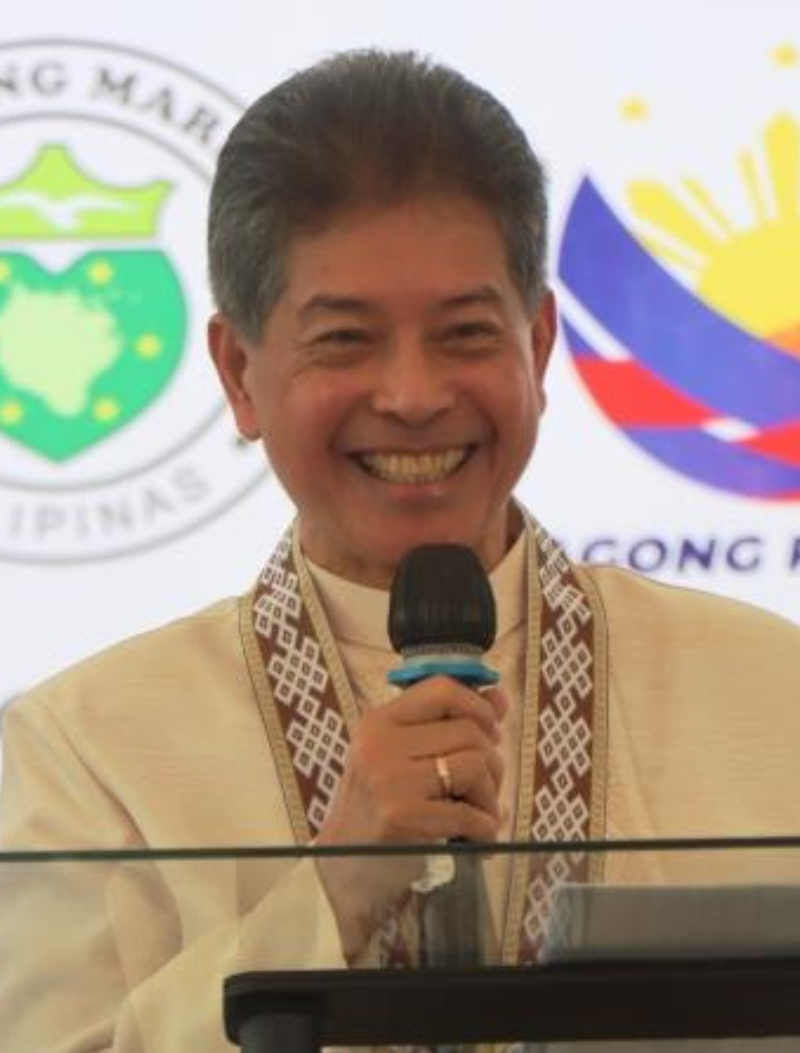

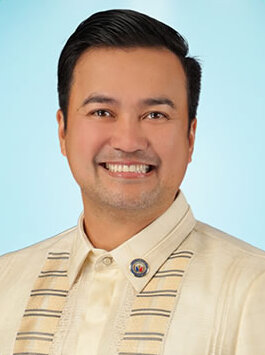
Candidate	Melecio Go	Lord Allan Velasco
Party	PDP	NPC
Alliance	Team Marinduque	Team Velasco
Running mate	Romulo Bacorro Jr.	Adeline Angeles
Popular vote	66,115	65,726
Percentage	50.15	49.85
Governor before election
Presbitero Velasco Jr.
PFP
Elected Governor
Melecio Go
PDP
- Vice gubernatorial election
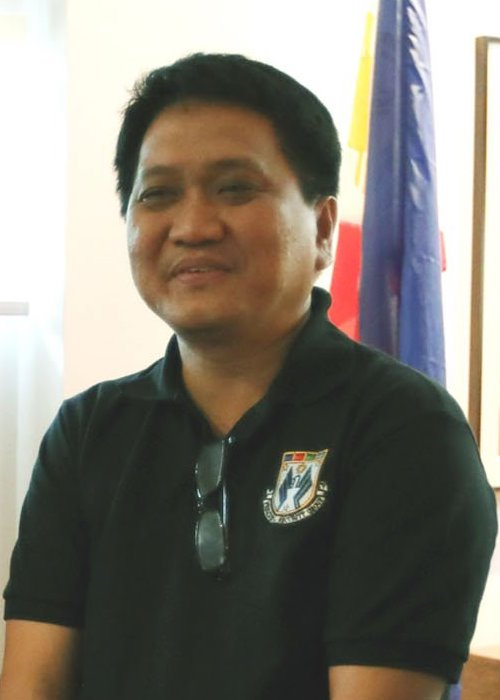

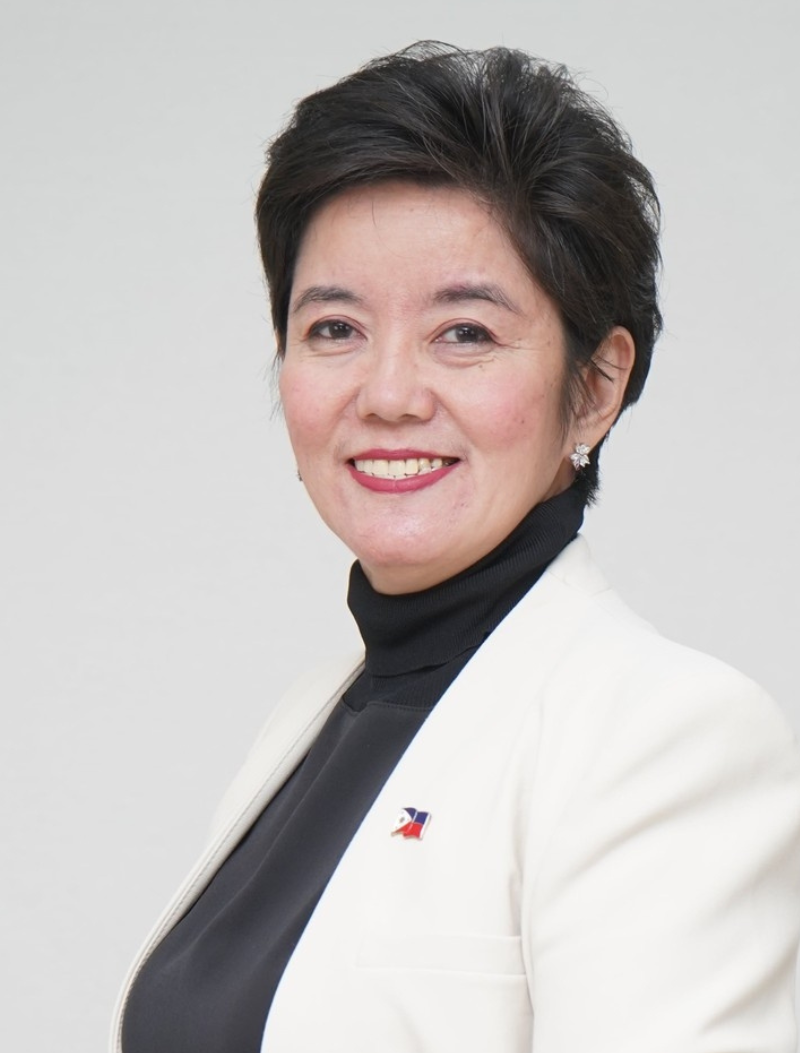
Candidate	Romulo Bacorro Jr.	Adeline Angeles
Party	Independent	PFP
Alliance	Team Marinduque	Team Velasco
Popular vote	75,930	51,982
Percentage	59.36	40.64
Vice Governor before election
Adeline Angeles
PFP
Elected Vice Governor
Romulo Bacorro Jr.
Independent
- Provincial Board election
- 10 out of 13 seats in the Marinduque Provincial Board; 7 seats needed for a majority
Party	Vote %	Seats	+/–
PFP	59.92	6	−1
Independent	32.18	3	+2
Lakas	7.90	1	+1
This lists parties that won seats. See the complete results below.

Local elections were held in Marinduque on May 12, 2025, as part of the 2025 Philippine general election. Voters selected candidates for all local positions: a town mayor, vice mayor and town councilors, as well as members of the Sangguniang Panlalawigan, a vice-governor, a governor and a representative for the province's at-large congressional district in the House of Representatives.

The election resulted in a significant political realignment in Marinduque, with the incumbent members of the Velasco family, the province's ruling political dynasty, being defeated by opposition politicians.

== Background ==
The regional office of the Commission on Elections (COMELEC), based in Calapan in neighboring Oriental Mindoro, confirmed that 165,729 voters were registered to vote in Marinduque for this election, up from the 159,000 who were registered in the previous election. The COMELEC also confirmed that all posts in the province would be contested by at least two candidates, the first time this has happened since the 2016 elections.

On November 6, 2024, the COMELEC released its final certified list of candidates running for provincial office, with 20 candidates vying for 13 posts.

Although the provincial elections were contested by multiple candidates, Rappler had concluded that the races for governor and congressman were not expected to be competitive as the incumbent candidates were expected to win handily.

== Provincial elections ==
=== Governor ===
Incumbent governor Presbitero Velasco Jr. ran for congressman despite being eligible to run for a third term, swapping with his son Lord Allan Velasco who ran instead for governor. Unlike in the 2022 election where he ran for congressman under PDP–Laban, he ran in this election under the Nationalist People's Coalition. His opponent was Melecio Go, who last ran for governor in the 2016 election under the Nacionalista Party and had since run in this election as the PDP candidate.

Although the COMELEC initially accepted the nomination of Manuel Rejano, who was running as an independent, his candidacy was ultimately rejected with the release of the final list of candidates.

Marinduque gubernatorial election
Party	Candidate	Votes	%
PDP	Melecio Go	66,115	50.15
NPC	Lord Allan Velasco	65,726	49.85
Total votes		131,841	100
PDP gain from PFP			

==== Opinion polling ====
Fieldwork Date(s)	Pollster	Sample Size	MoE	Go PDP	Rejano Independent	Velasco NPC	Undecided
October 2024	Pahina	325	±3%	3.1%	15.1%	80.0%	1.8%

==== By municipality ====
Municipality	Go		Velasco		Total votes	
Municipality	Votes	%	Votes	%	Total votes	
Boac	16,152	50.34	15,934	49.66	32,086	100.00
Buenavista	6,201	50.75	6,017	49.25	12,218	100.00
Gasan	12,720	63.65	7,264	36.35	19,984	100.00
Mogpog	6,621	35.20	12,187	64.80	18,808	100.00
Santa Cruz	16,640	51.70	15,547	48.30	32,187	100.00
Torrijos	7,781	46.99	8,777	53.01	16,558	100.00
Total	66,115	50.15	65,726	49.85	131,841	100.00

=== Vice Governor ===
Adeline Angeles, the incumbent vice governor, ran for re-election as the running mate of Lord Allan Velasco, although she ran under the Partido Federal ng Pilipinas, the same party as that of the elder Velasco. Her opponent was her immediate predecessor, Romulo Bacorro Jr., who ran for governor in the previous election under Aksyon but was now running in this election as an independent with Melecio Go as his running mate.

Marinduque vice gubernatorial election
Party	Candidate	Votes	%
Independent	Romulo Bacorro Jr.	75,930	59.36
PFP	Adeline Angeles	51,982	40.64
Total votes		127,912	100
Independent gain from PFP			

==== Opinion polling ====
Fieldwork Date(s)	Pollster	Sample Size	MoE	Angeles PFP	Bacorro Independent	Undecided
October–December 2024	Pahina	81	±5%	64.2%	32.1%	3.7%

==== By municipality ====
Municipality	Bacorro Jr.		Angeles		Total votes	
Municipality	Votes	%	Votes	%	Total votes	
Boac	18,434	59.05	12,785	40.95	31,219	100.00
Buenavista	6,032	49.70	6,105	50.30	12,137	100.00
Gasan	11,437	59.25	7,865	40.75	19,302	100.00
Mogpog	11,156	62.25	7,008	37.75	18,164	100.00
Santa Cruz	21,152	67.42	10,220	32.58	31,372	100.00
Torrijos	7,319	47.78	7,999	52.22	15,318	100.00
Total	75,930	59.36	51,982	40.64	127,912	100.00

=== Provincial Board ===
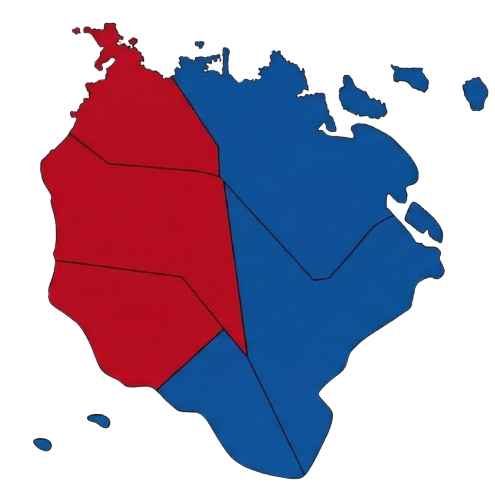
Sangunniang Panlalawigan districts of Marinduque. Areas shown in red represent the first district; blue represent the second district.

Party	Popular vote		Seats	
Party	Total	%	Total	%
PFP	234,079	59.92%	6	46.15%
Independent	125,728	32.18%	3	23.08%
Lakas	30,840	7.90%	1	7.69%
Ex officio seats	—	—	3	23.08%
Total	390,647	100%	13	100%

In the final list of candidates running for provincial-level positions released by the COMELEC, 14 candidates were announced as running for seats in the Provincial Board, with seven candidates running in each district.

In 2024, Marinduque was one of 22 provinces whose income classification was upgraded by the Department of Finance. As a result, the COMELEC subsequently announced that the province's two board districts were to elect five members each to the Provincial Board starting with this election, as opposed to four per district as was the case in previous elections.

==== 1st District ====
Municipality: Boac, Mogpog, Gasan

Marinduque 1st District Sangguniang Panlalawigan election
Party	Candidate	Votes	%
PFP	Mark Julius Caballes	41,396	19.02
PFP	Antonio Mangcucang III	35,138	16.15
Independent	Gilbert Daquioag	33,730	15.50
PFP	Aurelio Leva III	29,520	13.56
Independent	John R. Pelaez	28,518	13.10
Independent	Luisito Majaba (Note: Majaba was subsequently endorsed by the PFP following the COMELEC's announcement expanding the Provincial Board to five members per district, but was nevertheless officially listed as an independent on the ballot.)	27,302	12.54
PFP	Robert Opis	22,031	10.12
Total votes		217,635	100.00

==== 2nd District ====
Municipality: Santa Cruz, Torrijos, Buenavista

Marinduque 2nd District Sangguniang Panlalawigan election
Party	Candidate	Votes	%
Lakas	Joam Morales	30,840	17.83
PFP	Danilo Red	28,550	16.5
PFP	Mercedes Rejano	27,938	16.15
Independent	Primo Pamintuan	25,276	14.61
PFP	Ishmael Lim	24,956	14.42
PFP	Mel Encabo	24,550	14.19
Independent	Michael Cabagon	10,902	6.3
Total votes		173,012	100.00

== Congressional election ==
Philippine House of Representatives election in Marinduque
- May 12, 2025
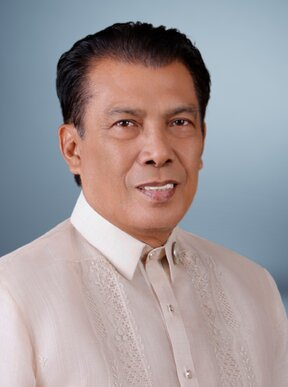

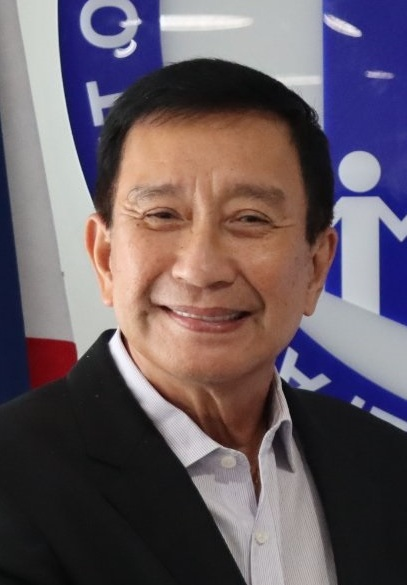
Candidate	Reynaldo Salvacion	Presbitero Velasco Jr.
Party	Independent	PFP
Alliance	Team Marinduque	Team Velasco
Popular vote	73,677	56,527
Percentage	56.59	43.41
Congressman before election
Lord Allan Velasco
NPC
Elected Congressman
Reynaldo Salvacion
Independent

Incumbent congressman Lord Allan Velasco ran for governor after serving three terms in Congress, swapping with his father Presbitero Velasco Jr. who ran for congressman. Unlike in the 2022 election where he ran for governor under PDP–Laban, he was running in this election under the PFP. Velasco filed his certificate of candidacy on October 7, 2024.

Velasco's opponent was Reynaldo Salvacion, who ran for vice governor in the 2022 election as the candidate of the Alliance for Barangay Concerns and had decided to run in this election as an independent.

Philippine House of Representatives election in Marinduque
Party	Candidate	Votes	%
Independent	Reynaldo Salvacion	73,677	56.59
PFP	Presbitero Velasco Jr.	56,527	43.41
Total votes		130,204	100.00
Independent gain from NPC			

=== Opinion polling ===
Fieldwork Date(s)	Pollster	Sample Size	MoE	Salvacion Independent	Velasco PFP	Undecided
October 2024	Pahina	189	±4%	39.9%	61.2%	2.2%

==== By municipality ====
Municipality	Salvacion		Velasco Jr.		Total votes	
Municipality	Votes	%	Votes	%	Total votes	
Boac	19,621	62.09	11,981	37.91	31,602	100.00
Buenavista	8,699	66.52	4,379	33.48	13,078	100.00
Gasan	12,107	62.70	7,202	37.30	19,309	100.00
Mogpog	7,654	41.28	10,888	58.72	18,542	100.00
Santa Cruz	18,345	58.00	13,287	42.00	31,632	100.00
Torrijos	7,251	45.20	8,790	54.80	16,041	100.00
Total	73,677	56.59	56,527	43.41	130,204	100.00

== Municipal elections ==
Parties are as stated in their certificates of candidacy.

=== Boac ===
In Boac, the provincial capital, the municipal election was contested primarily between candidates from the Partido Federal ng Pilipinas (PFP) and several independents, with Rappler citing the Boac mayoral election as being the most competitive race in the province.

==== Mayor ====
Incumbent Armi Carrion, the widow of former governor Jose Antonio Carrion, ran for re-election to her third and final term. Unlike in the 2022 election where she ran under PDP–Laban, she was running in this election as a candidate of the PFP. Her opponents in the election were James Dellosa, an engineer who ran against Carrion in the 2022 election under the PFP and who was now running as an independent, and Dindo Hidalgo, a lawyer who also ran as an independent.

Boac mayoral election
Party	Candidate	Votes	%
PFP	Armi Carrion	16,761	50.18
Independent	James Dellosa	11,743	35.16
Independent	Dindo Hidalgo	4,899	14.67
Total votes		33,403	100.00
PFP hold			

===== Opinion polling =====
Fieldwork Date(s)	Pollster	Sample Size	MoE	Carrion PFP	Dellosa Independent	Hidalgo Independent
January–March 2025	Pahina	2,417	±1.99%	32.27%	34.22%	33.18%

==== Vice Mayor ====
Incumbent Mark Anthony Seño ran for re-election. Similar to his running mate Carrion, he ran as a candidate of the PFP after running as the candidate of PDP–Laban in the 2022 election. His opponent was municipal councilor Theresa Caballes, running as an independent together with Dellosa.

Boac vice mayoral election
Party	Candidate	Votes	%
PFP	Mark Anthony Seño	17,503	54.22
Independent	Theresa Caballes	14,777	45.78
Total votes		32,280	100.00
PFP hold			

===== Opinion polling =====
Fieldwork Date(s)	Pollster	Sample Size	MoE	Caballes Independent	Seño PFP
January–March 2025	Pahina	402	±4.78%	54.7%	45.3%

=== Mogpog ===
In Mogpog, the municipal election was contested primarily between candidates from the PFP and several independent candidates.

==== Mayor ====
Incumbent Augusto Leo Livelo ran for vice mayor after serving three terms as mayor. His brother, former mayor Senen Livelo Jr., ran in his stead. His opponents in the election were Marina Luna, running as an independent, and Vincent Michael Velasco, brother of Lord Allan Velasco.

Mogpog mayoral election
Party	Candidate	Votes	%
Independent	Senen Livelo Jr.	12,000	61.77
PFP	Vincent Michael Velasco	7,085	36.47
Independent	Marina Luna	341	1.76
Total votes		19,426	100.00
Independent hold			

==== Vice Mayor ====
Incumbent Jonathan Garcia ran for re-election. Unlike in the 2022 election where he ran under PDP–Laban, he was running in this election as a candidate of the PFP. His opponent was the incumbent mayor, Augusto Leo Livelo.

Mogpog vice mayoral election
Party	Candidate	Votes	%
Independent	Augusto Leo Livelo	13,471	70.54
PFP	Jonathan Garcia	5,627	29.46
Total votes		19,098	100.00
Independent gain from PFP			

===== Opinion polling =====
Fieldwork Date(s)	Pollster	Sample Size	MoE	Garcia PFP	Livelo Independent
January–March 2025	Pahina	503	±4.29%	51.89%	47.71%

=== Gasan ===
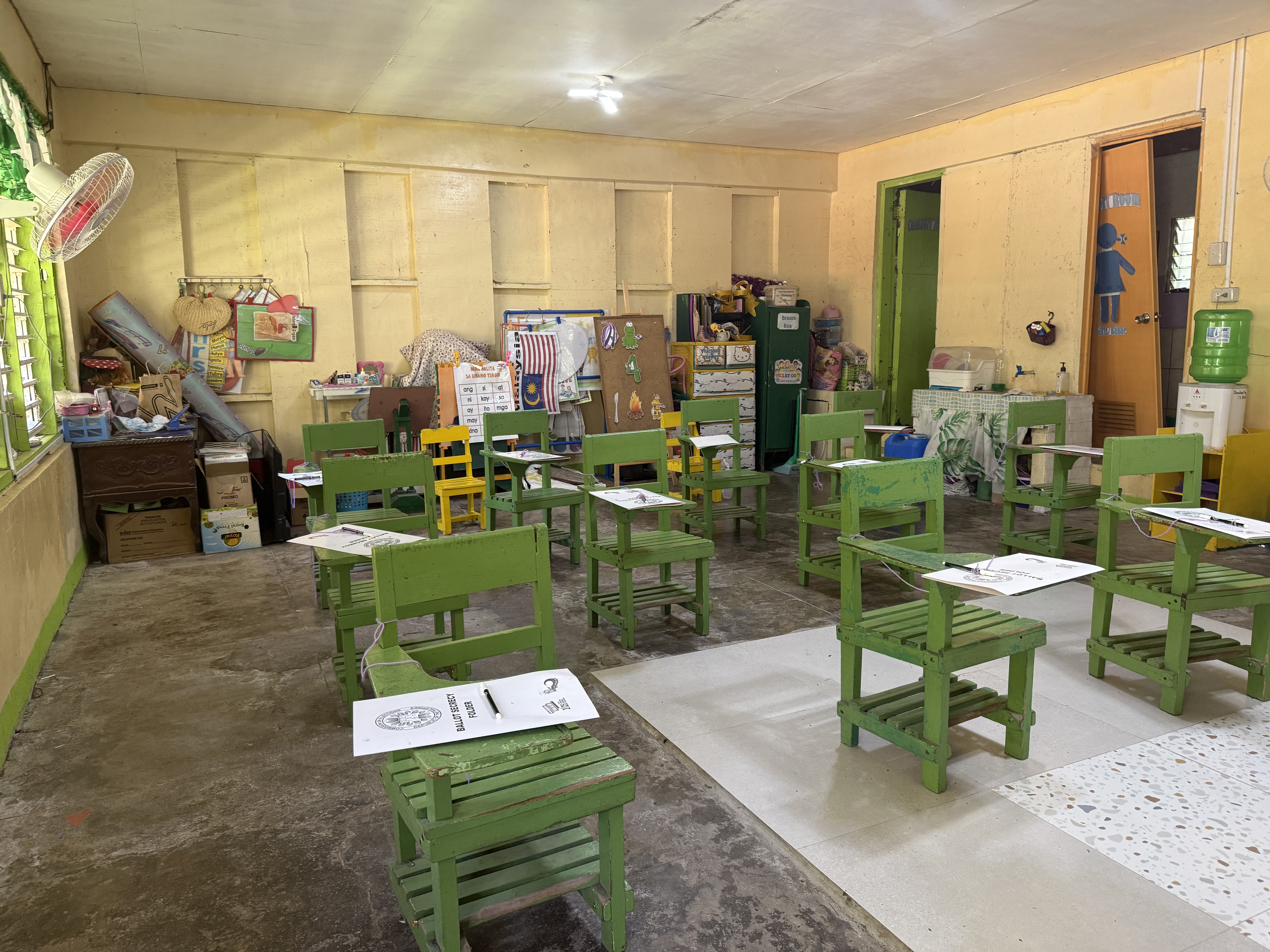
Polling station for the 2025 elections at the Gasan Central School

In Gasan, the municipal election was contested primarily between candidates from the PFP and the Alliance for Barangay Concerns.

==== Mayor ====
Incumbent Rolando O. Tolentino ran for re-election. Unlike in the 2022 election, where he ran under PDP–Laban, he was running in this election as a candidate of the PFP. His opponents in the election were Fortunato Hilvano Jr., running as an independent, and James Marty Lim, barangay captain of Barangay Dos and national chairman emeritus of the League of Barangays in the Philippines who also ran for governor in the 2022 election under the ABC.

Gasan mayoral election
Party	Candidate	Votes	%
ABC	James Marty Lim	10,550	51.38
PFP	Rolando O. Tolentino	9,270	45.14
Independent	Fortunato Hilvano Jr.	714	3.48
Total votes		20,534	100.00
ABC gain from PFP			

===== Opinion polling =====
Fieldwork Date(s)	Pollster	Sample Size	MoE	Hilvano Independent	Lim ABC	Tolentino PFP
January–March 2025	Pahina	216	±6.57%	13.89%	49.07%	36.11%

==== Vice Mayor ====
Incumbent Lidany Baldo ran for re-election as the running mate of James Marty Lim. Her opponent was municipal councilor Joy Raymond Isidro, running under the PFP as Tolentino's running mate.

Gasan vice mayoral election
Party	Candidate	Votes	%
ABC	Lidany Baldo	11,126	55.09
PFP	Joy Raymond Isidro	9,070	44.91
Total votes		20,196	100.00
ABC hold			

===== Opinion polling =====
Fieldwork Date(s)	Pollster	Sample Size	MoE	Baldo ABC	Isidro PFP
January–March 2025	Pahina	42	±15.09%	59.52%	40.48%

=== Santa Cruz ===
In Santa Cruz, the municipal election was contested primarily between candidates from the NPC and the PFP.

==== Mayor ====
Incumbent Marisa Red-Martinez ran for re-election. Unlike in the 2022 election, where she ran under the NPC, she was running in this election as a candidate of the PFP. Her opponent was her immediate predecessor, Antonio Uy Jr., who was now running as the NPC candidate after running in the previous election as a candidate of the People's Reform Party.

Santa Cruz mayoral election
Party	Candidate	Votes	%
PFP	Marisa Red-Martinez	17,205	50.58
NPC	Antonio Uy Jr.	16,812	49.42
Total votes		34,017	100.00
PFP hold			

===== Opinion polling =====
Fieldwork Date(s)	Pollster	Sample Size	MoE	Red PFP	Uy NPC
January–March 2025	Pahina	3,688	±1.54%	50.79%	48.79%

==== Vice Mayor ====
Incumbent Medwin "Bobs" Manuel ran for re-election. His opponent was Isaganie "Agimat" Revilla, running under the PFP.

Santa Cruz vice mayoral election
Party	Candidate	Votes	%
Independent	Bobs Manuel	19,264	57.98
PFP	Agimat Revilla	13,962	42.02
Total votes		33,226	100.00
Independent hold			

===== Opinion polling =====
Fieldwork Date(s)	Pollster	Sample Size	MoE	Manuel Independent	Revilla PFP
January–March 2025	Pahina	2,992	±1.73%	50.94%	48.33%

=== Torrijos ===
In Torrijos, the municipal election was contested primarily between candidates from the PFP and the ABC.

==== Mayor ====
Incumbent Lorna Velasco, the wife of Presbitero Velasco Jr., was term-limited and did not seek any other office. Although three candidates filed certificates of candidacy to run for mayor in this election, the COMELEC ultimately certified only two candidates: Christopher "Toper" Laus, who ran under the PFP, and Joey Peñaflor, who ran against Velasco for mayor in the 2022 election under Aksyon and was now running under the ABC.

Torrijos mayoral election
Party	Candidate	Votes	%
ABC	Joey Peñaflor	10,351	59.78
PFP	Toper Laus	6,963	40.22
Total votes		17,314	100.00
ABC gain from PFP			

===== Opinion polling =====
Fieldwork Date(s)	Pollster	Sample Size	MoE	Laus PFP	Peñaflor ABC
January–March 2025	Pahina	2,970	±1.12%	59.29%	39.93%

==== Vice Mayor ====
Incumbent Ricardo de Galicia was also term-limited and did not seek any other office. Two municipal councilors sought the position: Joel Cruzado, who ran under the PFP, and Edmar Frias, who ran under the ABC.

Torrijos vice mayoral election
Party	Candidate	Votes	%
ABC	Edmar Frias	11,609	67.96
PFP	Joel Cruzado	5,472	32.04
Total votes		17,081	100.00
ABC gain from PFP			

===== Opinion polling =====
Fieldwork Date(s)	Pollster	Sample Size	MoE	Cruzado PFP	Frias ABC
January–March 2025	Pahina	363	±5.01%	53.17%	46.56%

=== Buenavista ===
In Buenavista, the municipal election was contested primarily between candidates from the PFP and several independent candidates.

==== Mayor ====
Incumbent Eduard Siena ran for re-election. Unlike in the 2022 election, where he ran under Aksyon, he was running in this election as an independent. His opponent was his immediate predecessor, Nancy Madrigal, who ran as the PFP candidate.

Buenavista mayoral election
Party	Candidate	Votes	%
Independent	Eduard Siena	8,570	63.08
PFP	Nancy Madrigal	5,016	36.92
Total votes		13,586	100.00
Independent hold			

===== Opinion polling =====
Fieldwork Date(s)	Pollster	Sample Size	MoE	Madrigal PFP	Siena Independent
January–March 2025	Pahina	1,465	±2.56%	43.55%	51.47%

==== Vice Mayor ====
Incumbent David Vitto ran for re-election. His opponent was municipal councilor Herminigildo Malapote Jr., who ran as the PFP candidate.

Buenavista vice mayoral election
Party	Candidate	Votes	%
Independent	David Vitto	6,668	50.59
PFP	Herminigildo Malapote Jr.	6,512	49.41
Total votes		13,180	100.00
Independent hold			

===== Opinion polling =====
Fieldwork Date(s)	Pollster	Sample Size	MoE	Malapote PFP	Vitto Independent
January–March 2025	Pahina	62	±12.36%	43.55%	54.84%

== Aftermath ==
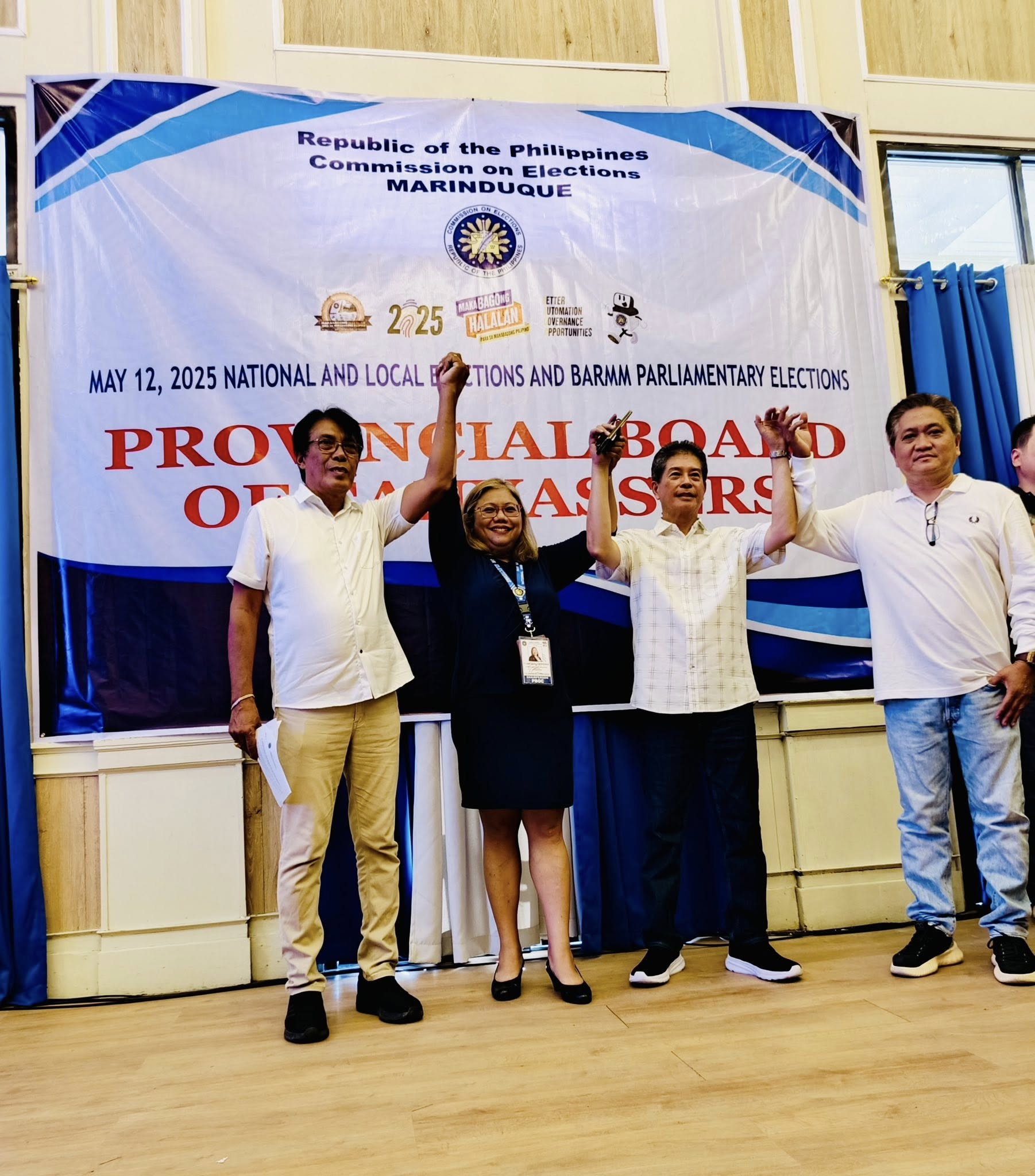
Proclamation of Salvacion, Go and Bacorro as congressman, governor and vice governor-elect respectively at the Marinduque Provincial Capitol in Boac

Go, Bacorro and Salvacion were officially proclaimed by the COMELEC as governor, vice governor and congressman-elect the day after the election, calling the election based on 98.58% of the received election returns. Lord Allan Velasco officially conceded shortly thereafter on Facebook, thanking his supporters for their trust in him throughout the campaign.

The election marked a stunning reversal of fortunes for the Velasco family, whose members first began pursuing elected public office in 2010 and which culminated in their domination of the province's politics after the 2019 elections, dislodging the family of Carmencita Reyes which until then had been the province's dominant political dynasty. While the governor's race was decided by a very small margin, the decisive victory of the other opposition candidates suggests that the attempt of the incumbent Velascos to switch positions was a mistake, and has also been interpreted as being reflective of Marinduque voters wanting to move away from entrenched political dynasties in favor of a more independent provincial leadership, as well as better governance.

Public reaction to the election results was positive, with the defeat of the Velascos being seen as heralding a new era for Marinduque politics. The Daily Tribune published a short editorial on Facebook calling it the "end of a dynasty", "overdue" and a "correction" by Marinduque voters, and Rappler attributed the results to Marinduque voters' protest of political dynasties.

In the context of the 2025 elections Marinduque was seen as an outlier in Mimaropa, the region where it is located, as political dynasties in the rest of the region continued to remain dominant in their respective provinces, but even well-entrenched dynasties have also lost in other provinces in the Philippines more broadly, suggesting that their grip on power may not be as strong as people believe it to be.

=== Recount attempt ===
Despite having already conceded the governor's race, Lord Allan Velasco requested a manual recount on May 23, 2025, insisting that he was the one who actually won the election. His campaign claimed in its protest that there were discrepancies in the results from 189 precincts, with over 10,000 votes unaccounted for which could influence the outcome.
