= 2013 Philippine House of Representatives elections in Mimaropa =

Elections were held in Mimaropa for seats in the House of Representatives of the Philippines on May 13, 2013.

The candidate with the most votes will win that district's seat for the 16th Congress of the Philippines.

== Summary ==
Party	Popular vote	%	Swing	Seats won	Change
Liberal	292,858	38.7		4	
Nacionalista	104,971	13.9		1	
NPC	43,911	5.8		1	
NUP	93,474	12.4		1	
PPPL	57,485	7.6		1	
Lakas	35,321	4.7		0	
UNA	89,594	11.9		0	
Independent	37,498	5		0	
Total	755,112	100			
Valid votes	755,112	87.25			
Invalid votes	110,388	12.75			
Turnout	865,500				
Registered voters					

== Marinduque ==
Incumbent Lord Allan Jay Velasco, the son of Presbitero Velasco, Jr., an Associate Justice of the Supreme Court of the Philippines, is going up against Regina Ongsiako Reyes, daughter of provincial governor Carmencita Reyes and sister of Toll Regulatory Board Executive Director Edmundo Reyes, Jr. Velasco won against Edmundo Reyes in 2010; however, Reyes filed an election protest but the House of Representatives Electoral Tribunal dismissed Reyes' suit and even increase Velasco's lead an additional 39 votes after recounts.

Reyes was disqualified by the Commission on Elections' First Division after it ruled that she is a naturalized American citizen, which also caused her residency to be forfeited as the commission said that "she has not abandoned her domicile of choice in the USA." Reyes is allowed to appeal the decision to the commission en banc.

Philippine House of Representatives election at Marinduque
Party	Candidate	Votes	%
Liberal	Regina Ongsiako Reyes	41,072	48.50
NUP	Lord Allan Jay Velasco	38,111	44.91
Margin of victory		2,961	3.50%
Invalid or blank votes		5,497	6.49
Total votes		84,680	100.00
Liberal gain from NUP			

== Occidental Mindoro ==
Incumbent Ma. Amelita Villarosa is term limited. Edgardo Urieta is her party's nominee, his opponent is governor Josephine Sato.

2013 Philippine House of Representatives election at Occidental Mindoro
Party	Candidate	Votes	%
Liberal	Josephine Sato	84,897	65.18
Lakas	Edgardo Urieta	35,321	27.12
Margin of victory		49,576	38.06%
Invalid or blank votes		10,036	7.70
Total votes		130,254	100.00
Liberal gain from Lakas			

== Oriental Mindoro ==
=== 1st District ===
Incumbent Rodolfo Valencia is term limited; Calapan city mayor Paulino Leachon is his party's nominee.

2013 Philippine House of Representatives election at Oriental Mindoro's 1st district
Party	Candidate	Votes	%
Liberal	Paulino Salvador Leachon	67,197	51.93
UNA	John Nico Valencia	47,270	36.53
NPC	Renato Leviste	5,849	4.52
Margin of victory		19,927	15.40%
Invalid or blank votes		9,091	7.03
Total votes		129,407	100.00
Liberal hold			

=== 2nd District ===
Incumbent Reynaldo Umali is running unopposed.

2013 Philippine House of Representatives election at Oriental Mindoro's 2nd district
Party	Candidate	Votes	%
Liberal	Reynaldo Umali	75,933	70.36
Invalid or blank votes		31,982	29.64
Total votes		107,915	100.00
Liberal hold			

== Palawan ==
The second district of Palawan was redistricted into two districts: Puerto Princesa and Aborlan is designated as the third district, while the rest of the old second district retained that nomenclature.

=== 1st District ===
Incumbent Antonio C. Alvarez is term limited; his son Franz Joseph is his party's nominee.

2013 Philippine House of Representatives election at Palawan's st district
Party	Candidate	Votes	%
NUP	Franz Joseph Alvarez	55,363	47.55
Liberal	Alvin Sandoval	23,759	20.41
UNA	Roberto Rodriguez	22,065	18.95
Independent	Randy Rodriguez	1,145	0.98
Independent	Fernando Saw	954	0.82
Margin of victory		31,603	27.14%
Invalid or blank votes		13,140	11.29
Total votes		116,426	100.00
NUP hold			

=== 2nd District ===
Incumbent Rep. Victorino Dennis Socrates is running for the vice governorship. While his National Unity Party did not name a nominee, his local party Partidong Pagbabago ng Palawan nominated Frederick Abueg.

2013 Philippine House of Representatives election at Palawan's 2nd district
Party	Candidate	Votes	%
PPPL	Frederick Abueg	57,485	50.03
Nacionalista	Ramon Mitra III	38,724	33.70
Independent	Christopher Morales	525	0.46
Margin of victory		18,761	16.33%
Invalid or blank votes		18,158	15.80
Total votes		114,892	100.00
PPPL gain from NUP			

=== 3rd District ===
2013 Philippine House of Representatives election at Palawan's 3rd district
Party	Candidate	Votes	%
NPC	Douglas Hagedorn	38,062	45.61
Independent	Jimmy Carbonell	19,744	23.66
Independent	Eduardo Matillano	10,537	12.63
Independent	Raymundo Lagasca	4,226	5.06
Independent	Arcelie Altamera	210	0.25
Independent	Santiago Lazo	157	0.19
Margin of victory		18,318	21.95%
Invalid or blank votes		10,521	12.61
Total votes		83,457	100.00
NPC win (new seat)			

== Romblon ==
Eleandro Jesus Madrona is the incumbent.

2013 Philippine House of Representatives election at Romblon
Party	Candidate	Votes	%
Nacionalista	Eleandro Jesus Madrona	66,247	67.28
UNA	Natalio Beltran	20,259	20.57
Margin of victory		45,988	46.70%
Invalid or blank votes		11,963	12.15
Total votes		98,469	100.00
Nacionalista hold			
