= 2016 Philippine House of Representatives elections in Mimaropa =

Elections were held in Mimaropa for seats in the House of Representatives of the Philippines on May 9, 2016.

== Summary ==
Party	Popular vote	%	Swing	Seats won	Change
Liberal	554,993			4	Steady
NUP	172,924			2	▲1
Nacionalista	57,483			1	Steady
NPC	55,068			1	Steady
Independent	124,110			0	
UNA	106,594			0	
PPPL	0			0	▼1
Valid votes	1,071,172			8	
Invalid votes	223,494				
Turnout	1,294,666				
Registered voters					

== Marinduque ==
Regina Ongsiako Reyes was the congresswoman from June 30, 2013 - February 1, 2016. Reyes was disqualified by the Supreme Court due to issues with her citizenship. Lord Allan Velasco was sworn on February 1, 2016, becoming the incumbent representative.

2016 Philippine House of Representatives election at Marinduque's Lone District
Party	Candidate	Votes	%
NUP	Lord Allan Velasco	60,759	
Liberal	Regina Ongsiako Reyes	49,252	
Invalid or blank votes		8,031	
Total votes		118,042	
NUP hold			

== Occidental Mindoro ==
Josephine Y. Ramirez-Sato is the incumbent.

2016 Philippine House of Representatives election at Occidental Mindoro's Lone District
Party	Candidate	Votes	%
Liberal	Josephine Ramirez-Sato	142,551	
UNA	Damsy Malabanan	20,748	
Independent	Thomas Ledesma	6,556	
Invalid or blank votes		29,930	
Total votes		199,785	
Liberal hold			

== Oriental Mindoro ==
Each of Oriental Mindoro's two legislative districts will elect each representative to the House of Representatives. The candidate with the highest number of votes wins the seat.

=== 1st District ===
Paulino Salvador C. Leachon is the incumbent.

2016 Philippine House of Representatives election at Oriental Mindoro's 1st District
Party	Candidate	Votes	%
Liberal	Paulino Salvador Leachon	113,908	
UNA	Joel Teves	72,539	
Invalid or blank votes		16,498	
Total votes		202,945	
Liberal hold			

=== 2nd District ===
Reynaldo V. Umali is the incumbent

2016 Philippine House of Representatives election at Oriental Mindoro's 2nd District
Party	Candidate	Votes	%
Liberal	Reynaldo Umali	102,429	
Independent	Mylene Morante	21,102	
Invalid or blank votes		36,197	
Total votes		159,728	
Liberal hold			

== Palawan ==
Each of Palawan's three legislative districts will elect each representative to the House of Representatives. The candidate with the highest number of votes wins the seat.

=== 1st District ===
Franz Josef George E. Alvarez is the incumbent.

2016 Philippine House of Representatives election at Palawan's 1st District
Party	Candidate	Votes	%
NUP	Franz Josef George Alvarez	112,165	
Independent	Mariano Parangue	34,632	
Invalid or blank votes		40,262	
Total votes		187,059	
NUP hold			

=== 2nd District ===
Frederick F. Abueg is the incumbent and running unopposed

2016 Philippine House of Representatives election at Palawan's 2nd District
Party	Candidate	Votes	%
Liberal	Frederick Abueg	94,860	
Invalid or blank votes		68,896	
Total votes		163,756	
Liberal hold			

=== 3rd District ===
Douglas S. Hagedorn is the incumbent.

2016 Philippine House of Representatives election at Palawan's 3rd District
Party	Candidate	Votes	%
NPC	Gil Acosta	55,068	
Liberal	Douglas Hagedorn	51,993	
Independent	Cil Acosta	4,592	
Invalid or blank votes		7,653	
Total votes		119,306	
NPC hold			

== Romblon ==
Eleandro Jesus Madrona is the incumbent but ineligible for reelection. His party nominated his brother Emmanuel Madrona.

2016 Philippine House of Representatives election at Romblon's Lone District
Party	Candidate	Votes	%
Nacionalista	Emmanuel Madrona	57,483	
Independent	Robert Muyo Fabella	57,228	
UNA	Jose Madrid	13,307	
Invalid or blank votes		16,027	
Total votes		144,045	
Nacionalista hold			
