= 2019 Marinduque local elections =

Philippine election

2019 Marinduque gubernatorial election
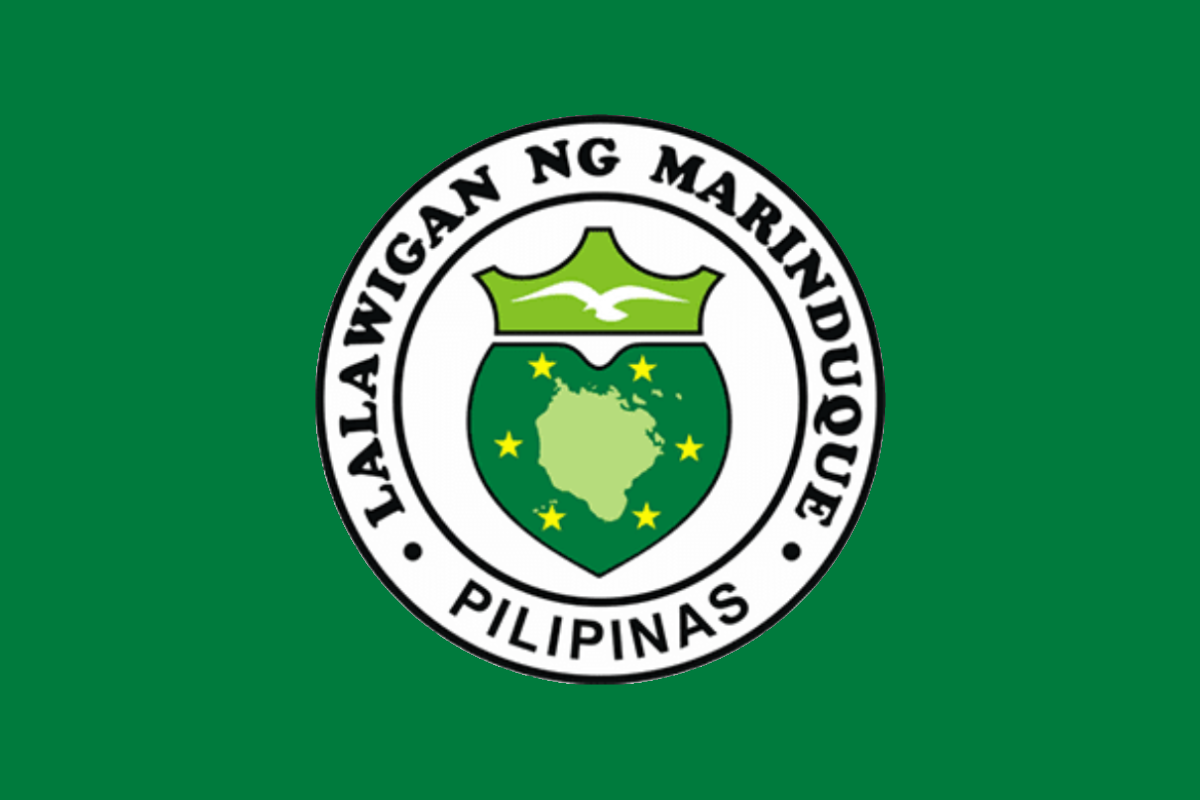
- May 13, 2019
- Registered: 152,570 ▲10.8%
- Turnout: 78.41% (▼8.32 pp)
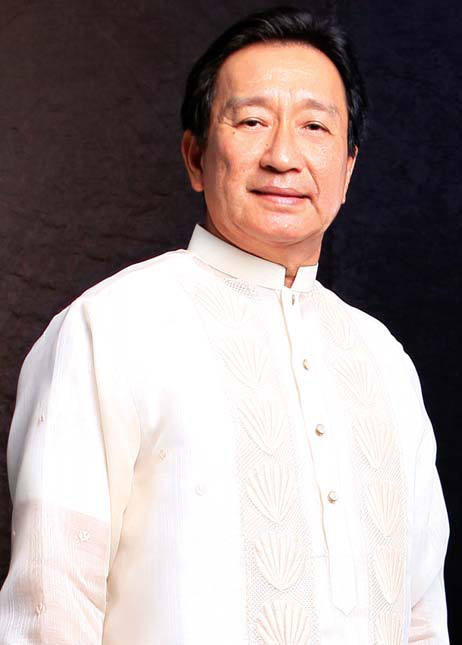

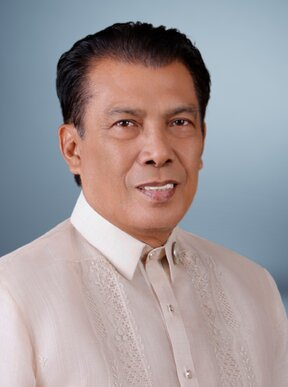

Candidate	Presbitero Velasco Jr.	Reynaldo Salvacion	Violet Reyes withdrawn
Party	PDP–Laban	Independent	UNA
Running mate	Romulo Bacorro		Allan Nepomuceno
Popular vote	66,526	34,347	5,015
Percentage	62.73	32.52	4.75
Governor before election
Romulo Bacorro
PDP–Laban
Elected Governor
Presbitero Velasco Jr.
PDP–Laban

Philippine House of Representatives election at Marinduque
- May 13, 2019
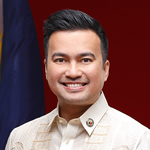

Candidate	Lord Allan Jay Velasco	Harold Lim
Party	PDP–Laban	UNA
Popular vote	95,067	5,488
Percentage	94.54	5.46
Congressman before election
Lord Allan Jay Velasco
PDP–Laban
Elected Congressman
Lord Allan Jay Velasco
PDP–Laban

Local elections were held in Marinduque on May 13, 2019, as part of the 2019 Philippine general election. Voters selected candidates for all local positions: a town mayor, vice mayor and town councilors, as well as members of the Sangguniang Panlalawigan, a vice-governor, a governor and a representative for the lone district of Marinduque in the House of Representatives.

In this election, a number of provincial-level officials sought reelection, including incumbent congressman Lord Allan Jay Velasco. This was the first election since the 1970s where Carmencita Reyes, who had previously served both as congressman and governor, was not running for office, having died in January 2019.

== Results ==
=== Governor ===
Romulo Bacorro assumed office after the death of Carmencita Reyes. He ran for his old position of Vice Governor in this election as the running mate of former Associate Justice Presbitero Velasco Jr. On May 3, Violet Reyes withdrew from the race.

Marinduque gubernatorial election
Party	Candidate	Votes	%
PDP–Laban	Presbitero Velasco, Jr.	66,526	62.73%
Independent	Reynaldo Salvacion	34,347	32.52%
UNA	Violet Reyes	5,015	4.75%
Total votes		105,618	100%
PDP–Laban hold			

=== Vice Governor ===
Mark Anthony Seño, who assumed the position after Romulo Bacorro became governor, ran for town councilor in Boac as he was ineligible to run for reelection as provincial board member after serving his third term in office.

Marinduque vice gubernatorial election
Party	Candidate	Votes	%
PDP–Laban	Romulo Bacorro	53,364	55.13%
Independent	Eleuterio Raza Jr.	22,324	23.06%
UNA	Allan Nepomuceno	21,118	21.81%
Total votes		96,806	100%
PDP–Laban hold			

=== District Representative ===
Lord Allan Jay Velasco was reelected.

Philippine House of Representatives election at Marinduque
Party	Candidate	Votes	%
PDP–Laban	Lord Allan Jay Velasco	95,067	94.54%
UNA	Harold Lim	5,488	5.46%
Total votes		100,555	100%
PDP–Laban hold			

=== Provincial Board elections ===
Party	Popular vote		Seats	
Party	Total	%	Total	%
PDP–Laban	173,685	61.91%	6	55%
UNA	70,542	25.14%	1	9%
Independent	36,326	12.95%	1	9%
Total	280,553	100%	8	72%

==== 1st District ====
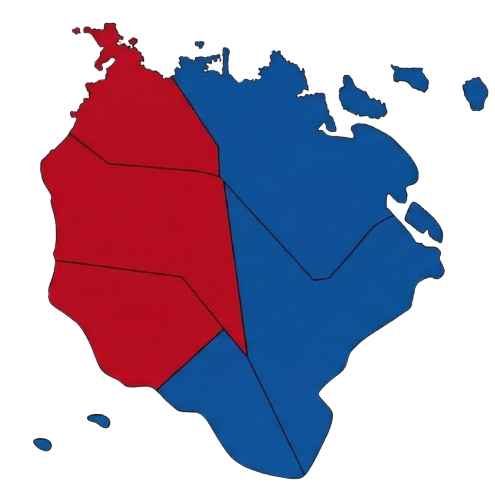
Sangunniang Panlalawigan districts of Marinduque. Areas shown in red represent the first district; blue represent second district.

Municipality: Boac, Mogpog, Gasan

Marinduque 1st District Sangguniang Panlalawigan election
Party	Candidate	Votes	%
PDP–Laban	Adeline Angeles	36,034	25.53%
PDP–Laban	John R. Pelaez	29,952	21.22%
UNA	Theresa Caballes	29,524	20.92%
PDP–Laban	Gilbert Daquioag	28,639	20.29%
UNA	Ruben Tan	16,988	12.03%
Total votes		141,137	100%

==== 2nd District ====
Municipality: Sta. Cruz, Torrijos, Buenavista

Marinduque 2nd District Sangguniang Panlalawigan election
Party	Candidate	Votes	%
PDP–Laban	Mel Encabo	23,020	16.51%
PDP–Laban	Mercedes Rejano	20,606	14.78%
PDP–Laban	Ishamel Lim	19,426	13.93%
Independent	Juan Fernandez Jr.	16,636	11.93%
PDP–Laban	Tom Pizarro	16,008	11.48%
UNA	Mar Perilla	14,100	10.11%
UNA	Edwin Ricafrente	9,930	7.12%
Independent	Norma Ricohermoso	9,034	6.48%
Independent	Mariano Fellizar Jr.	3,519	2.52%
Independent	Modest Rey Peñarubia	3,099	2.22%
Independent	Amado Roldan	2,148	1.54%
Independent	Apple Ricohermoso	1,890	1.36%
Total votes		139,416	100%

=== Municipal elections ===
Parties are as stated in their certificates of candidacy.

==== Boac ====
===== Mayor =====
Incumbent Roberto Madla retired from politics after becoming ineligible to run for reelection as mayor after serving his third term in office.

Boac Mayoralty election
Party	Candidate	Votes	%
Independent	Armi Carrion	13,478	51.51%
Independent	Benjamin Solomon	5,673	21.68%
UNA	Robert E. Opis	2,965	11.33%
Independent	Cristina Festin-Tan	2,490	9.52%
Independent	Dante Marquez	1,308	5.00%
Independent	Pedrito Nepomuceno	252	0.96%
Total votes		26,166	100%
Independent gain from UNA			

===== Vice Mayor =====
Incumbent Robert Opis ran for mayor.

Boac Vice Mayoralty election
Party	Candidate	Votes	%
PDP–Laban	Sonny Paglinawan	15,733	66.36%
UNA	Patrick Manguera	7,976	33.64%
Total votes		23,709	100%
PDP–Laban gain from UNA			

==== Mogpog ====
===== Mayor =====
Incumbent Augusto Leo Livelo ran unopposed.

Mogpog Mayoralty election
Party	Candidate	Votes	%
PDP–Laban	Augusto Leo Livelo	13,751	100%
PDP–Laban hold			

===== Vice Mayor =====
Belen Luisaga lost reelection.

Mogpog Vice Mayoralty election
Party	Candidate	Votes	%
Independent	Jonathan Garcia	8,731	54.78%
PDP–Laban	Belen Luisaga	6,889	43.22%
UNA	Mike Nuñez	319	2.00%
Total votes		15,939	100%
Independent gain from PDP–Laban			

==== Gasan ====
===== Mayor =====
Rolando Tolentino lost reelection.

Gasan Mayoralty election
Party	Candidate	Votes	%
PDP–Laban	Victoria L. Lim	9,242	53.72%
UNA	Rolando Tolentino	7,961	46.28%
Total votes		17,203	100%
PDP–Laban gain from UNA			

===== Vice Mayor =====
Yudel Sosa was reelected.

Gasan Vice Mayoralty election
Party	Candidate	Votes	%
UNA	Yudel Sosa	8,956	56.98%
PDP–Laban	Henry Evia	6,761	43.02%
Total votes		15,717	100%
UNA hold			

==== Santa Cruz ====
===== Mayor =====
Marisa Red-Martinez lost reelection.

Santa Cruz Mayoralty election
Party	Candidate	Votes	%
UNA	Antonio Uy Jr.	14,665	51.04%
PDP–Laban	Marisa Red-Martinez	14,067	48.96%
Total votes		28,732	100%
UNA gain from PDP–Laban			

===== Vice Mayor =====
Geraldine Morales was reelected.

Santa Cruz Vice Mayoralty election
Party	Candidate	Votes	%
UNA	Geraldine Morales	14,793	52.29%
PDP–Laban	Medwin Manuel	13,496	47.71%
Total votes		28,289	100%
UNA hold			

==== Torrijos ====
===== Mayor =====
Incumbent Lorna Velasco, the wife of Presbitero Velasco Jr., ran unopposed.

Torrijos Mayoralty election
Party	Candidate	Votes	%
PDP–Laban	Lorna Velasco	9,309	100%
PDP–Laban hold			

===== Vice Mayor =====
Incumbent Ricardo de Galicia ran unopposed.

Torrijos Vice Mayoralty election
Party	Candidate	Votes	%
PDP–Laban	Ricardo de Galicia	9,788	100%
PDP–Laban hold			

==== Buenavista ====
===== Mayor =====
Incumbent Russel Madrigal was ineligible to run for reelection as mayor after serving his third term in office. His wife, Nancy Madrigal, ran in his stead.

Buenavista Mayoralty election
Party	Candidate	Votes	%
PDP–Laban	Nancy Madrigal	7,905	100%
PDP–Laban hold			

===== Vice Mayor =====
Hannilee Siena was reelected.

Buenavista Vice Mayoralty election
Party	Candidate	Votes	%
PDP–Laban	Hannilee Siena	4,511	42.12%
Independent	Eve Rosas	4,052	37.84%
Independent	Arleigh Pe	2,146	20.04%
Total votes		10,709	100%
PDP–Laban hold			
