= 2010 Philippine House of Representatives elections in Mimaropa =

Philippine House of Representatives elections in Mimaropa, 2010
- May 10, 2010

7 seats of Mimaropa in the House of Representatives
	First party	Second party
Party	Lakas–Kampi	NPC
Seats won	4	1
Popular vote	424,139	239,876
Percentage	44.43%	25.13%
	Third party	Fourth party
Party	Liberal	Nacionalista
Seats won	1	1
Popular vote	162,715	78,218
Percentage	17.04%	8.19%
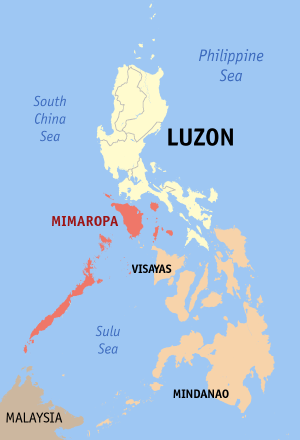
- Location of Mimaropa within the country.

Elections were held in Mimaropa for seats in the House of Representatives of the Philippines on May 10, 2010.

In each district, the candidate with the greatest number of votes was elected to represent that district's seat in the 15th Congress of the Philippines.

== Summary ==
Party	Popular vote	%	Seats won
Lakas–Kampi	424,139	44.43%	4
NPC	239,876	25.13%	1
Liberal	162,715	17.04%	1
Nacionalista	78,218	8.19%	1
PMP	21,734	2.28%	0
Aksyon	8,557	1.87%	0
PGRP	1,280	0.13%	0
KBL	281	0.03%	0
Independent	17,892	1.81%	0
Valid votes	954,692	92.45%	7
Invalid votes	77,936	7.55%	
Turnout	1,032,628	70.01%	
Registered voters	1,474,994	100.00%	

== Marinduque ==
Incumbent Carmencita Reyes switched to the Liberal Party from Lakas-Kampi-CMD and is running for the provincial governorship; her son Edmundo is her party's nominee for the district's seat.

The result of the election is under protest in the House of Representatives Electoral Tribunal (HRET). The HRET dismissed Reyes' petition, and even padded Velasco's winning margin by an additional 39 votes. The tribunal resolved that there were no election irregularities.

Candidate	Party	Votes	%
Lord Allan Velasco	Lakas–Kampi–CMD	52,407	52.04
Bernardo Paredes	Liberal Party	48,300	47.96
Total		100,707	100.00
Valid votes		100,707	96.82
Invalid/blank votes		3,306	3.18
Total votes		104,013	100.00
Lakas–Kampi–CMD gain from Liberal Party			
Source: Commission on Elections

== Occidental Mindoro ==
Ma. Amelita Villarosa is the incumbent.

Candidate	Party	Votes	%
Girlie Villarosa (incumbent)	Lakas–Kampi–CMD	84,626	53.45
Benjamin Tria	Nationalist People's Coalition	67,540	42.66
Clarita Samala	Aksyon Demokratiko	4,000	2.53
Josefino Garillo	Philippine Green Republican Party	1,280	0.81
Samloen Pimentel Sr.	Independent	876	0.55
Total		158,322	100.00
Valid votes		158,322	91.88
Invalid/blank votes		13,991	8.12
Total votes		172,313	100.00
Lakas–Kampi–CMD hold			
Source: Commission on Elections

== Oriental Mindoro ==
=== 1st District ===
Rodolfo Valencia is the incumbent.

Candidate	Party	Votes	%
Rodolfo Valencia (incumbent)	Lakas–Kampi–CMD	70,760	41.58
Maria Estela Felipa Aceron	Nacionalista Party	51,820	30.45
Renato Leviste	Nationalist People's Coalition	26,094	15.33
Alex Aranas	Pwersa ng Masang Pilipino	21,261	12.49
Jaime Talagtag	Independent	246	0.14
Total		170,181	100.00
Valid votes		170,181	93.80
Invalid/blank votes		11,251	6.20
Total votes		181,432	100.00
Lakas–Kampi–CMD hold			
Source: Commission on Elections

=== 2nd District ===
Incumbent Alfonso Umali is in his third consecutive term already and is ineligible for reelection. His brother Reynaldo Umali is his party's nominee for the district's seat.

Alfonso Cusi (Sandugo), the general manager of the Manila International Airport Authority, announced on March 3, 2010 that he withdraws his candidacy for the second congressional district of Mindoro Oriental.

Candidate	Party	Votes	%
Reynaldo Umali	Liberal Party	52,968	41.52
Thaddeus Venturanza	Lakas–Kampi–CMD	39,747	31.16
Anthony Yap	Nacionalista Party	26,326	20.64
Edmund Dante Janda	Aksyon Demokratiko	4,557	3.57
Benrome Abao	Independent	2,021	1.58
Alfonso Cusi (withdrew)	Sandugo	1,486	1.16
Ephraim Salcedo	Pwersa ng Masang Pilipino	473	0.37
Total		127,578	100.00
Valid votes		127,578	91.76
Invalid/blank votes		11,456	8.24
Total votes		139,034	100.00
Liberal Party hold			
Source: Commission on Elections

== Palawan ==
=== 1st District ===
Antonio Alvarez is the incumbent.

Candidate	Party	Votes	%
Antonio Alvarez (incumbent)	Lakas–Kampi–CMD	85,494	58.18
Vicente Sandoval	Liberal Party	61,447	41.82
Total		146,941	100.00
Valid votes		146,941	93.75
Invalid/blank votes		9,799	6.25
Total votes		156,740	100.00
Lakas–Kampi–CMD hold			
Source: ibanangayon.ph

=== 2nd District ===
Incumbent Abraham Khalil Mitra is in his third consecutive term already and is ineligible for reelection. He is running for the provincial governorship under the Liberal Party. His party didn't nominate anyone for this district. Outgoing governor Joel Reyes is running for the district under the Lakas Kampi CMD.

The result of the election is under protest in the House of Representatives Electoral Tribunal. But Reyes had become a fugitive due to alleged killing of journalist and environmentalist Gerardo "Gerry" Ortega.

Candidate	Party	Votes	%
Victorino Dennis Socrates	Nationalist People's Coalition	93,916	47.23
Mario Joel Reyes	Lakas–Kampi–CMD	91,105	45.81
Rodolfo Socrates	Independent	12,179	6.12
Christopher Morales	Independent	1,661	0.84
Total		198,861	100.00
Valid votes		198,861	90.14
Invalid/blank votes		21,761	9.86
Total votes		220,622	100.00
Nationalist People's Coalition gain from Liberal Party			
Source: ibanangayon.ph

== Romblon ==
Eleandro Jesus Madrona is the incumbent.

Candidate	Party	Votes	%
Eleandro Jesus Madrona (incumbent)	Nacionalista Party	71,610	57.23
Alicia Fetalvero	Nationalist People's Coalition	52,326	41.82
Jose Cesar Cabrera	Independent	909	0.73
Camilo Montesa Jr.	Kilusang Bagong Lipunan	281	0.22
Total		125,126	100.00
Valid votes		125,126	94.62
Invalid/blank votes		7,113	5.38
Total votes		132,239	100.00
Nacionalista Party hold			
Source: Commission on Elections
