= 2025 Philippine House of Representatives elections in Mimaropa =

- May 12, 2025
- All 8 Mimaropa seats in the House of Representatives
Party	Seats	+/–
Lakas	2	+2
Liberal	1	0
PFP	1	+1
Nacionalista	1	0
PRP	1	0
NPC	1	+1
Independent	1	+1
This lists parties that won seats. See the complete results below.

The 2025 Philippine House of Representatives elections in Mimaropa were held on May 12, 2025, as part of the 2025 Philippine general election.

== Summary ==
Congressional district	Incumbent	Incumbent's party	Winner	Winner's party	Winning margin
Marinduque	Lord Allan Velasco	NPC	Rey Salvacion	Independent	13.18%
Occidental Mindoro	Odie Tarriela	PFP	Odie Tarriela	PFP	26.72%
Oriental Mindoro–1st	Arnan Panaligan	Lakas	Arnan Panaligan	Lakas	Unopposed
Oriental Mindoro–2nd	Alfonso Umali Jr.	Liberal	Alfonso Umali Jr.	Liberal	11.19%
Palawan–1st	Vacant		Rose Salvame	PRP	18.28%
Palawan–2nd	Jose Alvarez	NPC	Jose Alvarez	NPC	34.58%
Palawan–3rd	Vacant		Gil Acosta Jr.	Lakas	3.86%
Romblon	Eleandro Jesus Madrona	Nacionalista	Eleandro Jesus Madrona	Nacionalista	66.05%

== Marinduque ==
Term-limited incumbent Lord Allan Velasco (Nationalist People's Coalition) ran for governor of Marinduque. He was previously affiliated with PDP–Laban.

Velasco endorsed his father, Marinduque governor Presbitero Velasco Jr. of the Partido Federal ng Pilipinas, who was defeated by former provincial board member Reynaldo Salvacion, an independent.

Candidate	Party	Votes	%
Reynaldo Salvacion	Independent	73,677	56.59
Presbitero Velasco Jr.	Partido Federal ng Pilipinas	56,527	43.41
Total		130,204	100.00
Valid votes		130,204	91.68
Invalid/blank votes		11,812	8.32
Total votes		142,016	100.00
Registered voters/turnout		165,436	85.84
Independent gain from NPC			
Source: Commission on Elections

== Occidental Mindoro ==
Incumbent Odie Tarriela of the Partido Federal ng Pilipinas ran for a second term. He was previously affiliated with Pederalismo ng Dugong Dakilang Samahan.

Tarriela won re-election against former representative Josephine Sato (Liberal Party).

Candidate	Party	Votes	%
Odie Tarriela (incumbent)	Partido Federal ng Pilipinas	155,102	63.36
Josephine Sato	Liberal Party	89,698	36.64
Total		244,800	100.00
Valid votes		244,800	95.61
Invalid/blank votes		11,234	4.39
Total votes		256,034	100.00
Registered voters/turnout		321,699	79.59
PFP hold			
Source: Commission on Elections

== Oriental Mindoro ==
=== 1st district ===
Incumbent Arnan Panaligan of Lakas–CMD won re-election for a second term unopposed. He was previously affiliated with Mindoro Bago Sarili.

Candidate	Party	Votes	%
Arnan Panaligan (incumbent)	Lakas–CMD	192,998	100.00
Total		192,998	100.00
Valid votes		192,998	76.99
Invalid/blank votes		57,690	23.01
Total votes		250,688	100.00
Registered voters/turnout		308,447	81.27
Lakas hold			
Source: Commission on Elections

=== 2nd district ===
Incumbent Alfonso Umali Jr. of the Liberal Party ran for a third term.

Umali won re-election against Oriental Mindoro vice governor Ejay Falcon (Galing at Serbisyo para sa Mindoreño) and Jerry Casao (Independent).

Candidate	Party	Votes	%
Alfonso Umali Jr. (incumbent)	Liberal Party	114,121	55.44
Ejay Falcon	Galing at Serbisyo para sa Mindoreño	91,073	44.25
Jerry Casao	Independent	636	0.31
Total		205,830	100.00
Valid votes		205,830	95.63
Invalid/blank votes		9,416	4.37
Total votes		215,246	100.00
Registered voters/turnout		261,154	82.42
Liberal hold			
Source: Commission on Elections

== Palawan ==
=== 1st district ===
The seat is vacant after Edgardo Salvame of the People's Reform Party died on March 13, 2024.

Salvame's widow, Rosalie Salvame (People's Reform Party), won the election against former representative Franz Josef Alvarez (National Unity Party).

Candidate	Party	Votes	%
Rosalie Salvame	People's Reform Party	145,701	59.14
Franz Josef Alvarez	National Unity Party	100,653	40.86
Total		246,354	100.00
Valid votes		246,354	95.73
Invalid/blank votes		10,983	4.27
Total votes		257,337	100.00
Registered voters/turnout		302,220	85.15
PRP hold			
Source: Commission on Elections

=== 2nd district ===
Incumbent Jose Alvarez of the Nationalist People's Coalition ran for a second term. He was previously affiliated with PDP–Laban.

Alvarez won re-election against former representative Beng Abueg (Liberal Party).

Candidate	Party	Votes	%
Jose Alvarez (incumbent)	Nationalist People's Coalition	139,469	67.29
Beng Abueg	Liberal Party	67,801	32.71
Total		207,270	100.00
Valid votes		207,270	91.38
Invalid/blank votes		19,563	8.62
Total votes		226,833	100.00
Registered voters/turnout		275,287	82.40
NPC hold			
Source: Commission on Elections

=== 3rd district ===
The seat is vacant after Edward Hagedorn of PDP–Laban died on October 3, 2023.

Gil Acosta Jr. (Lakas–CMD) won the election against former Palawan governor Abraham Mitra (Nacionalista Party) and Hagedorn's son, Clink Hagedorn (Independent).

Candidate	Party	Votes	%
Gil Acosta Jr.	Lakas–CMD	79,019	45.86
Abraham Mitra	Nacionalista Party	72,370	42.00
Clink Hagedorn	Independent	20,916	12.14
Total		172,305	100.00
Valid votes		172,305	96.97
Invalid/blank votes		5,390	3.03
Total votes		177,695	100.00
Registered voters/turnout		210,248	84.52
Lakas gain from PDP–Laban			
Source: Commission on Elections

== Romblon ==
Incumbent Eleandro Jesus Madrona of the Nacionalista Party ran for a third term.

Madrona won re-election against two other candidates.

Candidate	Party	Votes	%
Eleandro Jesus Madrona (incumbent)	Nacionalista Party	129,273	82.37
Vivien Carmona	Independent	25,612	16.32
Agustin Saluague	Independent	2,048	1.31
Total		156,933	100.00
Valid votes		156,933	87.77
Invalid/blank votes		21,867	12.23
Total votes		178,800	100.00
Registered voters/turnout		211,336	84.60
Nacionalista hold			
Source: Commission on Elections
