= Reynaldo Salvacion =

Filipino politician (born 1960)

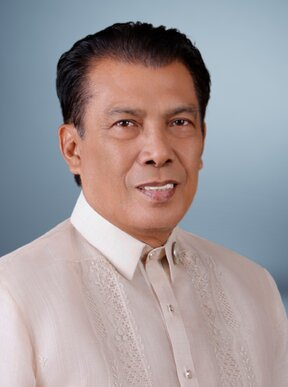
- Official portrait, 2026

Member of Philippine House of Representatives for Marinduque's at-large district
- Incumbent
- Assumed office June 30, 2025
- Preceded by: Lord Allan Velasco

Member of the Marinduque Provincial Board from the 2nd district
- In office June 30, 2016 – June 30, 2019

Member of the Buenavista Municipal Council
- In office June 30, 2010 – June 30, 2013

Personal details
- Born: February 4, 1960 (age 66) Buenavista, Marinduque, Philippines
- Party: Lakas (2025–present)
- Other political affiliations: Independent (2015–2019; 2024–2025); ABC (2021–2022); Liberal (2009–2013)
- Spouse: Veronica Salvacion
- Website: reynaldosalvacion.com
- Nickname: Rey

Reynaldo Padilla Salvacion (born February 4, 1960) is a Filipino politician who has served as the representative for Marinduque's at-large congressional district in the Philippine House of Representatives since 2025. Currently a member of Lakas–CMD, he previously served as a member of the Marinduque Provincial Board from 2016 to 2019.

== Early political career ==
=== Buenavista Municipal Council (2010–2013) ===
Salvacion first entered politics as a municipal councilor of Buenavista from 2010 to 2013, elected under the Liberal Party. During his term as councilor, he served as president of the Philippine Councilors League–Marinduque Chapter, making him an ex-officio member of the Marinduque Provincial Board.

=== Marinduque Provincial Board (2016–2019) ===
In 2016, Salvacion won a full term as a regular provincial board member as an independent candidate, finishing in second place.

=== Gubernatorial and vice gubernatorial bids (2019–2022) ===
Salvacion ran for governor of Marinduque in 2019 but lost to Presbitero Velasco Jr. of PDP–Laban. He later ran for vice governor under the Alliance for Barangay Concerns against incumbent provincial board member Adeline Angeles.

== House of Representatives (2025–present) ==
=== 2025 election ===
In 2025, incumbent representative and former House speaker Lord Allan Velasco was term-limited and unsuccessfully ran for governor. Salvacion decided to run as an independent against incumbent governor Presbitero Velasco Jr., winning with 73,677 votes (56.59%) against Velasco's 56,527 (43.41%). He later joined Lakas–CMD on June 3, 2025.

=== Tenure ===
During the 20th Congress, Salvacion was elected vice chairman of the House committees on Civil Service and Professional Regulation and Energy, as a member of five other committees as part of the majority bloc. He principally authored bills on amending the Electric Power Industry Reform Act of 2001, establishing a reintegration program for overseas Filipino workers, creating a Department of Water Resources and Water Regulatory Commission, providing benefits and a holiday for line workers, and declaring Marinduque as the official home of the Moriones Festival.

Salvacion in favor of the second impeachment of Vice President Sara Duterte on May 11, 2026.

=== Committee membership ===
==== 20th Congress ====
- Committee on Civil Service and Professional Regulation (Vice Chair)
- Committee on Energy (Vice Chair)
- Committee on Labor and Employment
- Committee on Local Government
- Committee on Natural Resources
- Committee on Overseas Workers Affairs
- Committee on Public Works and Highways

== Electoral history ==
Electoral history of Reynaldo Salvacion
Year	Office	Party	Votes received				Result
Year	Office	Party	Total	%	P.	Swing	Result
2010	Councilor (Buenavista)	Liberal	—N/a	—N/a	4th	—N/a	Won
2016	Board Member (Marinduque)	Independent	20,978	15.36%	2nd	—N/a	Won
2019	Governor of Marinduque	Independent	34,347	32.52%	2nd	—N/a	Lost
2022	Vice Governor of Marinduque	ABC	34,930	28.62%	2nd	—N/a	Lost
2025	Representative (Marinduque)	Independent	73,677	56.59%	1st	—N/a	Won

House of Representatives of the Philippines
Preceded by Lord Allan Velasco	Member of the Philippine House of Representatives for Marinduque's at-large district 2025–present	Incumbent
