= Lord Allan Velasco =

Speaker of the House of Representatives of the Philippines from 2020 to 2022

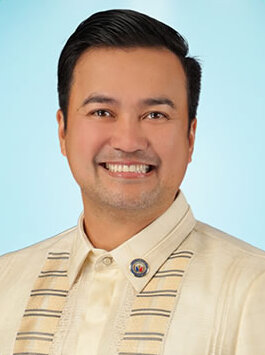
- Official portrait, 2022

27th Speaker of the House of Representatives of the Philippines
- In office October 12, 2020 – June 30, 2022
- Preceded by: Alan Peter Cayetano
- Succeeded by: Martin Romualdez

Member of the Philippine House of Representatives from Marinduque's Lone District
- In office February 1, 2016 – June 30, 2025
- Preceded by: Regina Ongsiako Reyes
- Succeeded by: Reynaldo Salvacion
- In office June 30, 2010 – June 30, 2013
- Preceded by: Carmencita Reyes
- Succeeded by: Regina Ongsiako Reyes

Chairperson of the Philippine House Committee on Energy
- In office August 17, 2022 – June 30, 2025
- Preceded by: Juan Miguel Arroyo
- In office July 25, 2016 – October 12, 2020
- Succeeded by: Juan Miguel Arroyo

Provincial Administrator of Marinduque
- In office January 2008 – December 1, 2009
- Governor: Jose Antonio Carrion

Personal details
- Born: Lord Allan Jay Quinto Velasco; November 9, 1977 (age 48) Pasay, Philippines
- Party: NPC (2022–present)
- Other political affiliations: PDP–Laban (2016–2022); NUP (2011–2016); Lakas (2009–2011)
- Spouse: Rowena Amara (m. 2012)
- Children: 5
- Parent(s): Presbitero Velasco; Lorna Quinto Velasco
- Education: De La Salle University (BS); University of Santo Tomas (LLB)
- Occupation: Politician
- Profession: Lawyer

Lord Allan Jay Quinto Velasco (born November 9, 1977) is a Filipino politician and lawyer who served as the Speaker of the House of Representatives from October 12, 2020 to June 2022. He was concurrently serving as the Representative of Marinduque's lone district from 2010 to 2013 and from 2016 to 2025. He previously served as the Marinduque chapter president of the Integrated Bar of the Philippines, and Marinduque provincial administrator under Governor Jose Antonio Carrion.

== Personal life ==
=== Early life and family ===
Velasco was born on November 9, 1977. His father is lawyer Presbitero Velasco Jr., who would later serve as an Associate Justice of the Supreme Court from 2006 to 2018 and governor of their home province Marinduque since 2019. His mother, Lorna Quinto Velasco, originally a nurse, ventured into politics: first as the Representative of Ang Mata'y Aalagaan (AMA or MATA) party-list from 2013 to 2016, and from 2016 onwards as mayor of Torrijos, Marinduque. His sister, Tricia Nicole Velasco-Catera, is also a lawyer. Velasco-Catera was their father's judicial staff head in the Supreme Court, and their mother's chief of staff in the House. She was AMA/MATA party-list's representative from 2016 to 2019.

Velasco was educated in Manila, earning his Bachelor of Science in business management from De La Salle University, and his Bachelor of Laws from the University of Santo Tomas. He was admitted to the Integrated Bar of the Philippines (IBP) in 2005.

Velasco married Rowena "Wen" Amara on September 21, 2012. They have five children: Sophia, Bella, Ramon, Sara, and Lord Jose Maria. Wen chairs the Pilipinong May Puso Foundation, a charity launched in 2016 in honor of Soledad Duterte, President Rodrigo Duterte's late mother. Several high-profile personalities attended the baptism of their daughter Sara in September 2019: President Bongbong Marcos, former President Rodrigo Duterte, businessman Ramon Ang, senators Bong Go, Mark Villar and Sonny Angara, and Quezon City mayor Joy Belmonte.

=== Friendship with the Dutertes ===
The Velascos grew close to Rodrigo Duterte when they supported his presidential campaign. On Christmas of 2016, the Velascos celebrated at the Duterte family's house in Davao City. The Velasco couple also organized celebrations for the President's birthday in 2017 and 2018. The President and his daughter, Davao City mayor Sara Duterte, were also guests at Velasco's 2018 birthday party. Velasco considers Sara Duterte his "big bike riding buddy". In the 2019 election, the President endorsed the Velasco family, who were running for various offices in Marinduque.

== Political career ==
=== Provincial Administrator of Marinduque (2008–2009) ===
Early in his law career, he served as the chapter president of the IBP in Marinduque. In January 2008, he was appointed as the provincial administrator of Marinduque by Governor Jose Antonio Carrion. He also headed the Provincial Tourism Council where he focused on "sports adventure and community-based tourism". He resigned as provincial administrator on December 1, 2009 to file his candidacy for the province's lone House seat.

=== House of Representatives (2010–2013, 2016-2025) ===
In the 2010 elections, running under Lakas–Kampi, Velasco defeated Edmundo Reyes, the son of then-incumbent representative Carmencita Reyes. Velasco became the first elected government official in his family.

Velasco was defeated in his bid for re-election in 2013 by Regina Ongsiako Reyes, daughter of incumbent Governor Carmencita Reyes, but Velasco disputed Reyes' victory by noting that Reyes was a United States citizen during the election and was thus ineligible to hold the office. Both the Supreme Court and the COMELEC upheld Velasco's protest. Despite this, House Speaker Feliciano Belmonte maintained that a decision to remove Reyes from her seat is up to the House Electoral Tribunal, where Velasco's case to remove her was still pending. Velasco was later proclaimed as the legitimate representative of Marinduque's lone district and assumed office on February 1, 2016.

He is the incumbent representative of the Lone District of Marinduque and chairman of the House Committee on Energy. He is also the chairman of the Oversight Committee on Solid Waste Management Act and co-chairman of the Joint Congressional Power Commission.

==== Speaker (2020–2022) ====
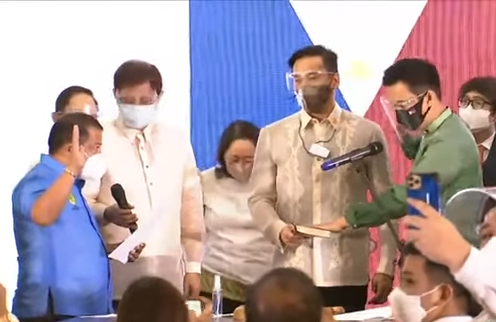
Velasco taking his oath of office as House Speaker on October 12, 2020

With Cayetano's refusal to honor the term-sharing agreement after 184 representatives rejected his offer of resignation on September 30, 2020 and abruptly suspending the House's session on October 6, 2020, Velasco called on Cayetano to resume the House's session before November 16, 2020. He and his allies also affirmed their intent to conduct a session on October 14, 2020 to formalize his assumption as Speaker of the House of Representatives.

During a gathering of 186 representatives at Celebrity Sports Complex in Quezon City, Velasco was elected as House Speaker on October 12, 2020, two days before the term-sharing agreement that he and Alan Peter Cayetano agreed upon in July 2019 went into effect. However, Cayetano disputed Velasco's election and called the gathering a "fake session."

On October 13, 2020, Cayetano tendered his "irrevocable resignation" as Speaker through a Facebook livestream, as 186 representatives formally ratified Velasco's election as the new Speaker in the Batasang Pambansa during the start of their special session.

On November 18, 2020, Velasco was appointed by the House as legislative caretaker of Cebu City's 1st district after the death of representative Raul del Mar two days earlier.

=== Gubernatorial run (2025) ===
Upon being term-limited, Velasco ran for Governor of Marinduque in 2025. However, he lost to Melecio Go by almost 400 votes. With the concurrent defeats of his father Presbitero in the congressional race and his brother Mike in the Mogpog mayoral race, the Velasco family's 15-year political dominance in Marinduque concluded. He filed an election protest before the COMELEC through his legal counsel, Atty. Rowell Ilagan, seeking the manual recount of the votes.

== Controversy ==
In September 2026, Velasco was accused by his former head of security, dismissed police officer Rodulfo Gracioso Jr., in a sworn affidavit submitted to the National Bureau of Investigation (NBI), of accumulating illicit funds from a ₱2 billion bribery and kickback scheme. Gracioso claimed that between 2018 and 2022, Velasco accumulated illicit funds from Curlee and Sarah Discaya and other Department of Public Works and Highways (DPWH) contractors at his Valle Verde 2 residence in Pasig, and delivered cash and luxury-filled vans to members of the Duterte family. Velasco's legal counsel, Atty. Rowell Ilagan, denied the allegations, characterizing them as fabricated and chronologically inconsistent with verifiable events, while Vice President Sara Duterte claimed not to know Gracioso and dismissed the claims as a politically motivated fabrication connected to her ongoing impeachment trial.

== Electoral history ==
Electoral history of Lord Allan Velasco
Year	Office	Party	Votes received				Result
Year	Office	Party	Total	%	P.	Swing	Result
2010	Representative (Marinduque at-large)	Lakas–Kampi	52,407	52.04%	1st	—N/a	Won
2013	Representative (Marinduque at-large)	NUP	38,111	44.91%	2nd	—N/a	Lost
2016	Representative (Marinduque at-large)	NUP	38,111	—N/a	1st	—N/a	Won
2019	Representative (Marinduque at-large)	PDP–Laban	95,067	94.54%	1st	—N/a	Won
2022	Representative (Marinduque at-large)	PDP–Laban	100,794	100.00%	1st	—N/a	Unopposed
2025	Governor of Marinduque	NPC	65,726	49.85%	2nd	—N/a	Lost

House of Representatives of the Philippines
Preceded by Carmencita O. Reyes	Member of the Philippine House of Representatives from Lone District of Marinduque; 2010–2013	Succeeded by Regina Ongsiako Reyes
Preceded by Regina Ongsiako Reyes	Member of the Philippine House of Representatives from Lone District of Marinduque; 2016–2025	Succeeded by Reynaldo Salvacion
Preceded by Alan Peter Cayetano	Speaker of the House of Representatives of the Philippines; 2020–2022	Succeeded by Martin Romualdez
