= Philippine House Committee on Energy =

Standing committee of the House of Representatives of the Philippines

Committee on Energy
- 20th Congress

History
- New session started: July 28, 2025

Leadership
- Chair: Jose Alvarez, NPC since July 30, 2025
- Minority Leader: Vacant since June 30, 2025

Website
- Committee on Energy

The Philippine House Committee on Energy, or House Energy Committee is a standing committee of the Philippine House of Representatives.

== Jurisdiction ==
As prescribed by House Rules, the committee's jurisdiction includes the following:

- Entities involved in energy or power generation, transmission, distribution and supply
- Exploration, development, utilization or conservation of energy resources

== Members, 20th Congress ==
Position	Member	Constituency	Party
Chairperson	Jose Alvarez	Palawan–2nd	NPC
Vice Chairpersons	Vacant		
Members for the Majority	Vacant		
Members for the Minority	Vacant		

== Historical membership rosters ==
=== 18th Congress ===
Position	Members	Party	Province/City	District
Chairperson	Juan Miguel Arroyo	Lakas	Pampanga	2nd
Vice Chairpersons	Alfred Vargas	PDP–Laban	Quezon City	5th
Vice Chairpersons	Jericho Jonas Nograles	PBA	Party-list	
Vice Chairpersons	David Suarez	Nacionalista	Quezon	2nd
Vice Chairpersons	Narciso Bravo Jr.	NUP	Masbate	1st
Vice Chairpersons	Presley De Jesus	PHILRECA	Party-list	
Vice Chairpersons	Jesus Manuel Suntay	PDP–Laban	Quezon City	4th
Vice Chairpersons	Hector Sanchez	Lakas	Catanduanes	Lone
Vice Chairpersons	Jose Enrique Garcia III	NUP	Bataan	2nd
Members for the Majority	Jonathan Keith Flores	PDP–Laban	Bukidnon	2nd
Members for the Majority	Paulino Salvador Leachon	PDP–Laban	Oriental Mindoro	1st
Members for the Majority	Antonino Calixto	PDP–Laban	Pasay	Lone
Members for the Majority	Joselito Sacdalan	PDP–Laban	Cotabato	1st
Members for the Majority	Rosanna Vergara	PDP–Laban	Nueva Ecija	3rd
Members for the Majority	Ria Christina Fariñas	PDP–Laban	Ilocos Norte	1st
Members for the Majority	Sonny Lagon	Ako Bisaya	Party-list	
Members for the Majority	Eric Yap	ACT-CIS	Party-list	
Members for the Majority	Jocelyn Tulfo	ACT-CIS	Party-list	
Members for the Majority	Faustino Michael Carlos Dy III	PFP	Isabela	5th
Members for the Majority	Abdullah Dimaporo	NPC	Lanao del Norte	2nd
Members for the Majority	Arnulf Bryan Fuentebella	NPC	Camarines Sur	4th
Members for the Majority	Ciriaco Gato Jr.	NPC	Batanes	Lone
Members for the Majority	Gerardo Valmayor Jr.	NPC	Negros Occidental	1st
Members for the Majority	Jake Vincent Villa	NPC	Siquijor	Lone
Members for the Majority	John Reynald Tiangco	Partido Navoteño	Navotas	Lone
Members for the Majority	Elias Bulut Jr.	NPC	Apayao	Lone
Members for the Majority	Julienne Baronda	NUP	Iloilo City	Lone
Members for the Majority	Alfelito Bascug	NUP	Agusan del Sur	1st
Members for the Majority	Luisa Lloren Cuaresma	NUP	Nueva Vizcaya	Lone
Members for the Majority	Adolph Edward Plaza	NUP	Agusan del Sur	2nd
Members for the Majority	Diego Ty	NUP	Misamis Occidental	1st
Members for the Majority	Juliette Uy	NUP	Misamis Oriental	2nd
Members for the Majority	Vicente Veloso III	NUP	Leyte	3rd
Members for the Majority	Wilfredo Caminero	NUP	Cebu	2nd
Members for the Majority	Gerardo Espina Jr.	Lakas	Biliran	Lone
Members for the Majority	John Marvin Nieto	NUP	Manila	3rd
Members for the Majority	Alyssa Sheena Tan	PFP	Isabela	4th
Members for the Majority	Adriano Ebcas	AKO PADAYON	Party-list	
Members for the Majority	Ramon Nolasco Jr.	NUP	Cagayan	1st
Members for the Majority	Jose Teves Jr.	TGP	Party-list	
Members for the Majority	Ruth Mariano-Hernandez	Independent	Laguna	2nd
Members for the Majority	Antonio Albano	NUP	Isabela	1st
Members for the Majority	Francisco Jose Matugas II	PDP–Laban	Surigao del Norte	1st
Members for the Majority	Cesar Jimenez Jr.	PDP–Laban	Zamboanga City	1st
Members for the Majority	Allan Ty	LPGMA	Party-list	
Members for the Majority	Sabiniano Canama	COOP-NATCCO	Party-list	
Members for the Majority	Sharon Garin	AAMBIS-OWA	Party-list	
Members for the Majority	Roger Mercado	Lakas	Southern Leyte	Lone
Members for the Majority	Aloysia Lim	RAM	Party-list	
Members for the Minority	Sergio Dagooc	APEC	Party-list	
Members for the Minority	Godofredo Guya	RECOBODA	Party-list	
Members for the Minority	Isagani Amatong	Liberal	Zamboanga del Norte	3rd
Members for the Minority	Stella Luz Quimbo	Liberal	Marikina	2nd
Members for the Minority	Sarah Jane Elago	Kabataan	Party-list	

==== Chairperson ====
- Lord Allan Velasco (Marinduque–Lone, PDP–Laban) July 22, 2019 – October 12, 2020

== See also ==
- House of Representatives of the Philippines
- List of Philippine House of Representatives committees
- Department of Energy
- Energy in the Philippines
