= Presbitero Velasco Jr. =

Filipino judge (born 1948)

The Honorable Presbitero J. Velasco Jr.
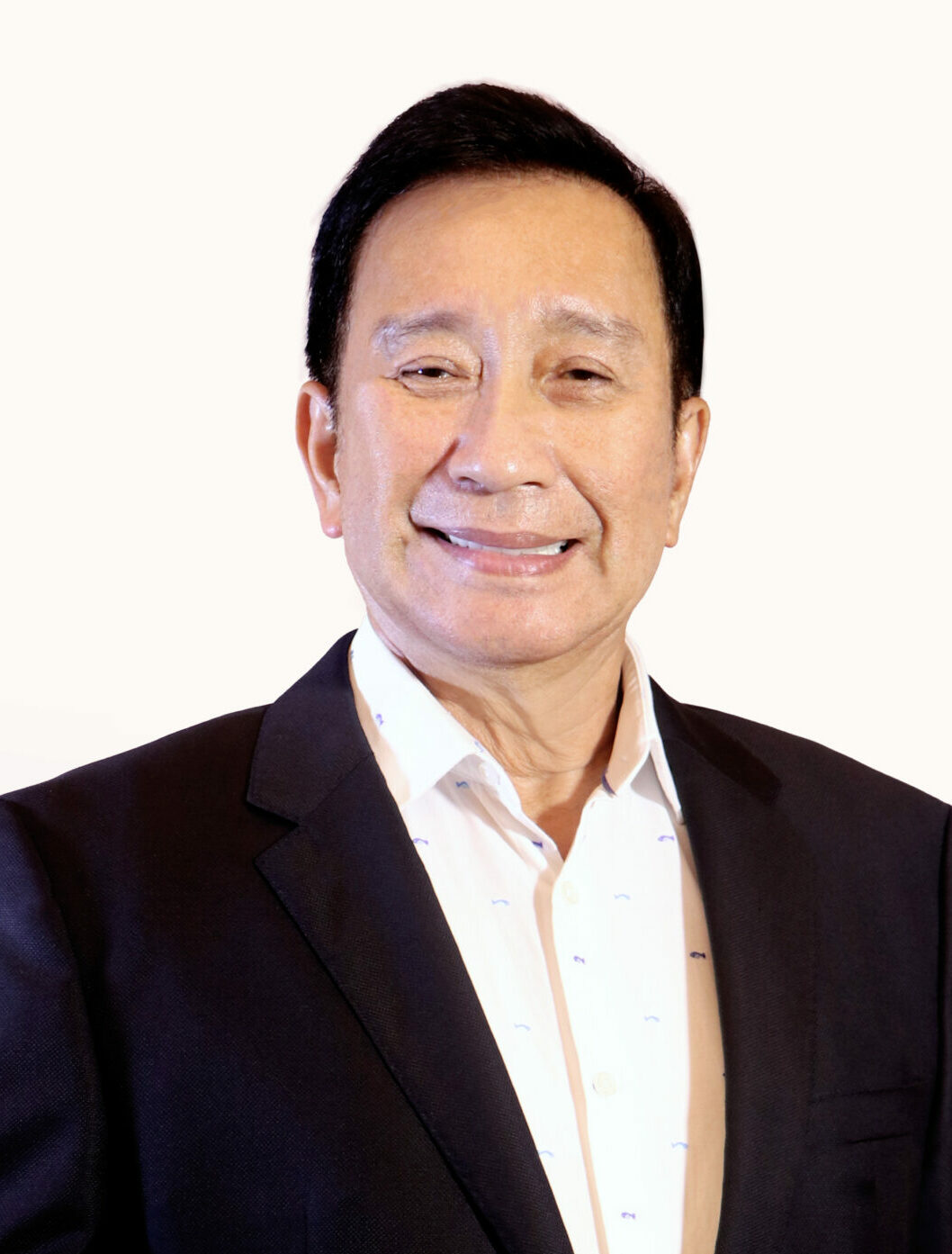
- Portrait, 2021

Governor of Marinduque
- In office June 30, 2019 – June 30, 2025
- Vice Governor: Romulo Bacorro Jr. (2019–2022); Adeline Angeles (2022–2025)
- Preceded by: Romulo Bacorro Jr.
- Succeeded by: Melecio J. Go

157th Associate Justice of the Supreme Court of the Philippines
- In office March 31, 2006 – August 8, 2018
- Appointed by: Gloria Macapagal Arroyo
- Preceded by: Artemio Panganiban
- Succeeded by: Jose Reyes Jr.

Associate Justice of the Philippine Court of Appeals
- In office April 22, 1998 – August 8, 2003
- Appointed by: Joseph Estrada

Judicial and Bar Council member from the Integrated Bar
- In office January 7, 1993 – March 22, 1995
- Appointed by: Fidel V. Ramos
- Preceded by: Leon Garcia Jr.
- Succeeded by: Francisco Santiago

Personal details
- Born: August 8, 1948 (age 78) Pasay, Rizal, Philippines
- Party: PFP (2024–present)
- Other political affiliations: PDP–Laban (2018–2024)
- Spouse: Lorna Quinto Velasco
- Children: Vincent Michael; Lord Allan Jay; Tricia Nicole
- Education: University of the Philippines Diliman (BA, LL.B)
- Affiliation: Sigma Rho

Presbitero Jose Velasco Jr. (born August 8, 1948) is a Filipino lawyer who served as governor of Marinduque from 2019 to 2025 and as an Associate Justice of the Supreme Court of the Philippines from 2006 to 2018. He was appointed to the Supreme Court by President Gloria Macapagal Arroyo on March 31, 2006.

== Early life and education ==
Born on August 8, 1948, in Pasay, Velasco attended public schools such as J. Sumulong Elementary School (where he finished First Honorable Mention) and the University of the Philippines (UP) Preparatory School, respectively, for elementary and high school.

He obtained his Bachelor of Arts degree in Political Science from UP, finishing the course in only three years. He went on to take up his Bachelor of Laws from the same university. At the UP College of Law, Velasco was a member of the Order of the Purple Feather Honor Society and served on the Editorial Board of the Philippine Law Journal. He graduated eighth in the Class of 1971. He placed sixth in the 1971 Philippine Bar Examination with a bar rating of 89.85%.

== Legal career ==
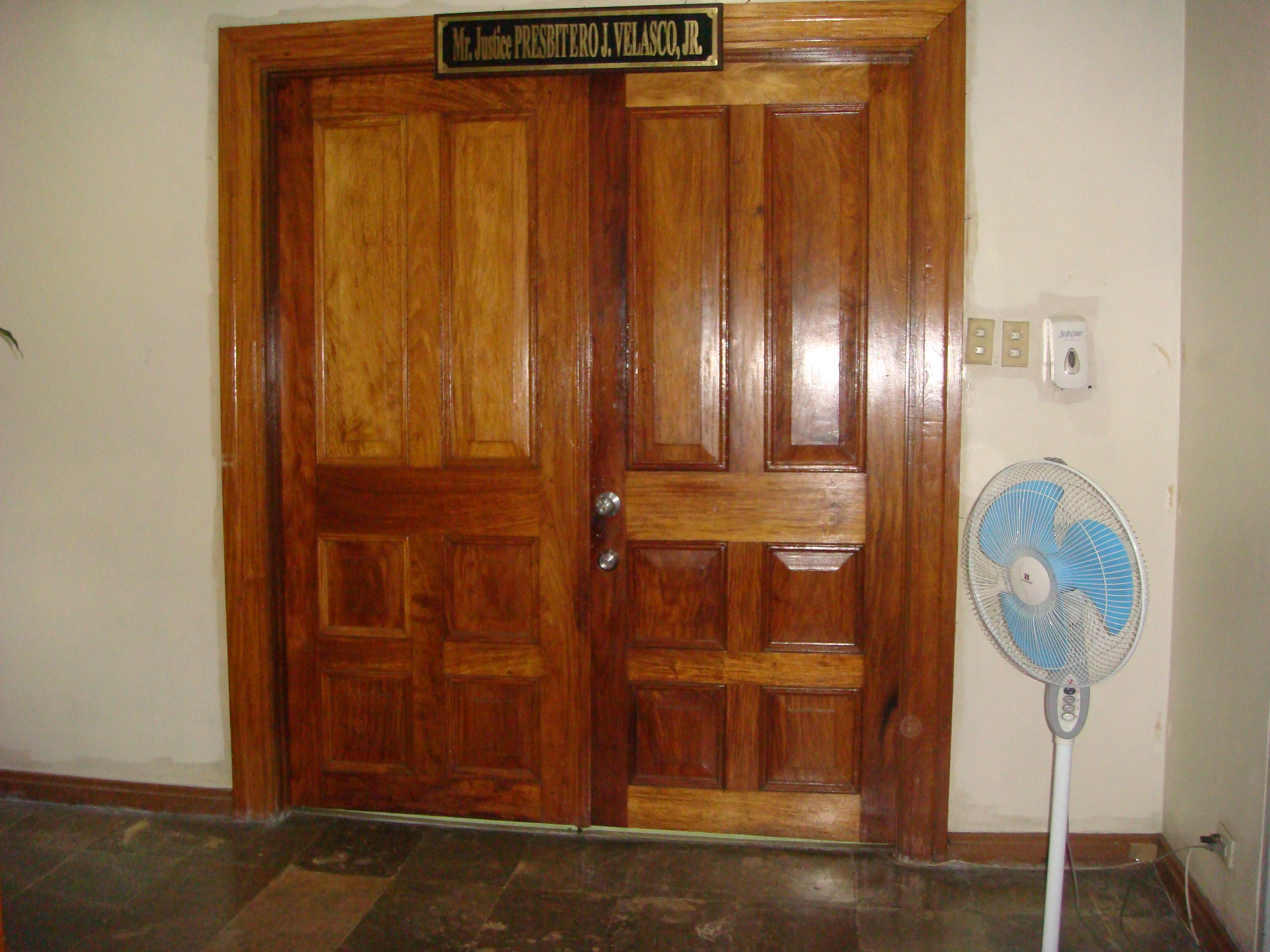
Chambers of Presbitero J. Veslasco Jr. in the new Supreme Court of the Philippines building.

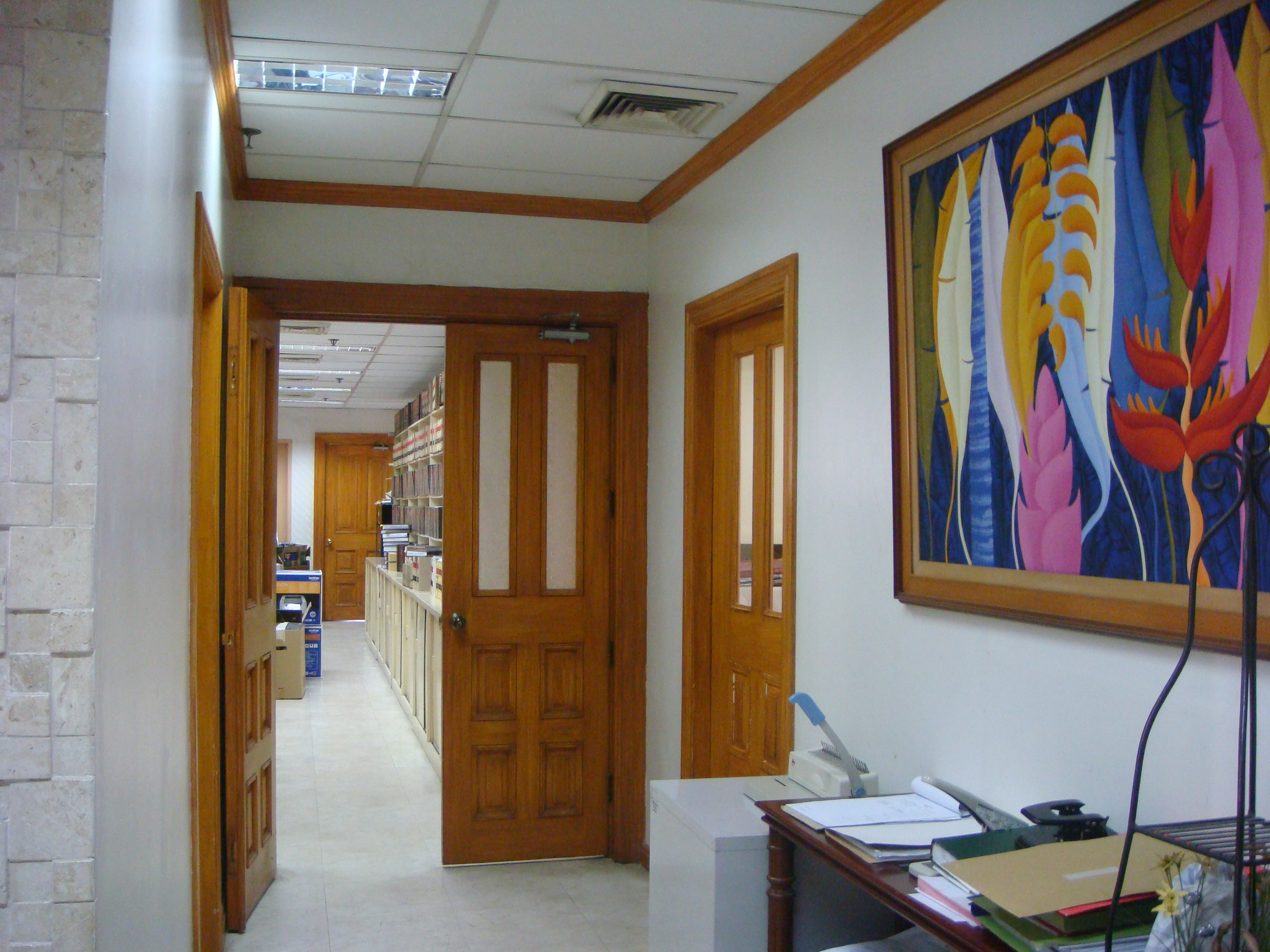
Offices and library in the chambers.

Velasco engaged in private law practice for 20 years before joining the public sector as a regular member of the Judicial and Bar Council in 1993.

He served as Undersecretary of the Department of Justice from 1995 to April 1998. He was concurrently Commissioner of the Housing and Land Use Regulatory Board. He was also Chairman of the Board of Pardons and Parole, Commissioner of the Commission on Settlement of Land Disputes, and Member of the Committee on Privatization.

In 1998, he was appointed Court of Appeals Justice. He was ranked eighth in disposition of cases when he was named Court Administrator in 2003.

Justice Velasco has also served the Integrated Bar of the Philippines (IBP) in several capacities: as its National President in 1987, as Commissioner of the IBP Committee on Bar Discipline, and as Honorary Chairman and Past National Co-Chairman of the IBP National Committee on Legal Aid.

He was awarded Most Outstanding Jurist by the Consumers Union of the Philippines in 2000.

== Supreme Court of the Philippines (2006–2018) ==
Velasco was appointed Associate Justice of the Supreme Court of the Philippines by President Gloria Macapagal Arroyo on March 31, 2006. He retired from the post on his 70th birthday on August 8, 2018.

== Governor of Marinduque (2019–2025) ==
In 2018, Velasco filed his candidacy for Governor of Marinduque for the 2019 elections in which he won ending the rule of the Reyes clan, which has ruled Marinduque for almost two decades. He was re-elected in 2022.

Velasco opted not to seek reelection in 2025 to instead run for representative of Marinduque's at-large congressional district, aiming to replace his term-limited son. However, he lost to Reynaldo Salvacion.

== Personal life ==
Justice Velasco is married to Lorna Quinto-Velasco with whom he has three children: Vincent Michael, Lord Allan Jay, and Tricia Nicole. Tricia (Ateneo Law School, Juris Doctor program) passed the 2008 Philippine Bar Examination.

== Electoral history ==
Electoral history of Presbitero Velasco Jr.
Year	Office	Party	Votes received				Result
Year	Office	Party	Total	%	P.	Swing	Result
2019	Governor of Marinduque	PDP–Laban	66,526	62.73%	1st	—N/a	Won
2022	Governor of Marinduque	PDP–Laban	61,848	48.12%	1st	—N/a	Won
2025	Representative (Marinduque at-large)	PFP	56,527	43.41%	2nd	—N/a	Lost

== Some notable opinions ==
- Manotoc v. Court of Appeals (2006) — on requisites for valid service of summons
- Spouses Algura v. LGU of the City of Naga (2006) — on exemption of indigents from filing fees
- Republic of the Philippines v. SC Chief Justice Sereno (2018) — concurring and dissenting opinion on the Quo warranto petition against Maria Lourdes Sereno
- Senator Leila de Lima v. Hon. Juanita Guerrero (2018) — on Muntinlupa RTC Branch 204's jurisdiction over the arrest of Senator Leila de Lima

Political offices
Preceded by Romulo Baccoro Jr.	Governor of Marinduque; 2019–2025	Succeeded by Melecio Go
Legal offices
Preceded by Leon Garcia Jr.	Judicial and Bar Council Representative from the Integrated Bar; 1993–1995	Succeeded by Francisco Santiago
Preceded by Artemio Panganiban	Associate Justice of the Supreme Court of the Philippines; 2006–2018	Succeeded by Jose Reyes Jr.
