= Electric Power Industry Reform Act of 2001 =

2001 law restructuring the Philippine electric power industry

11th Congress of the Philippines
- Long title: An Act Ordaining Reforms in the Electric Power Industry, Amending for the Purpose Certain Laws and for Other Purposes
- Citation: Republic Act No. 9136
- Territorial extent: Philippines
- Passed by: House of Representatives of the Philippines
- Passed: May 31, 2001
- Passed by: Senate of the Philippines
- Passed: June 4, 2001
- Signed by: President Gloria Macapagal Arroyo
- Signed: June 8, 2001
- Commenced: June 26, 2001

Legislative history

Initiating chamber: House of Representatives of the Philippines
- Bill title: House Bill No. 8457

Revising chamber: Senate of the Philippines
- Bill title: Senate Bills Nos. 1712, 1621, 1943 and 2000

Amended by
- Republic Act No. 10150 (2011); Republic Act No. 11552 (2021); Republic Act No. 12179 (2025)

Keywords
- Electricity; privatization; competition; power-sector regulation

Text of statute as originally enacted
- Status: In force

The Electric Power Industry Reform Act of 2001, officially designated as Republic Act No. 9136 and commonly abbreviated as EPIRA, is a Philippine law that restructured the country's electric power industry. It established a legal framework for separating the industry into generation, transmission, distribution, and supply sectors; privatizing most assets of the government's national power grid; and introducing competition in the wholesale and retail electricity markets.

The act was signed by President Gloria Macapagal Arroyo on June 8, 2001, and took effect on June 26, 2001. It created the Energy Regulatory Commission (ERC), the National Transmission Corporation (TransCo) (which turned over the grid from another government-owned corporation National Power Corporation (NPC) on March 1, 2003), and the Power Sector Assets and Liabilities Management Corporation (PSALM). It also directed the establishment of the Wholesale Electricity Spot Market (WESM) and a system of retail competition and open access under which qualified consumers may select their electricity suppliers.

EPIRA has remained the principal statutory framework governing the Philippine electricity industry. Studies have credited the reforms with expanding private participation, improving supply adequacy, and reducing the government's exposure to NPC's financial obligations. Other assessments have found that electricity prices remained high, retail competition developed slowly, and market concentration and regulatory capacity continued to present difficulties.

== Background ==
Operations and maintenance of the Philippine power grid and its associated assets and facilities were originally operated and maintained by the Philippine government (through National Power Corporation (NPC) and National Transmission Corporation (TransCo)) from November 3, 1936 to January 15, 2009 for 72 years and 2 months.

During the late 1980s and early 1990s, the Philippines experienced severe shortages in generating capacity and widespread power interruptions. The government responded by contracting with independent power producers, frequently through long-term agreements containing take-or-pay commitments. The 1997 Asian financial crisis increased the peso value of NPC's foreign-currency obligations and placed additional pressure on the corporation's finances.

From November 3, 1936 to March 1, 2003, NPC owned, operated, and maintained the transmission grid and its related assets and facilities as well as most power generating plants. The sector was affected by heavy NPC indebtedness, over-contracted generating capacity, limited consumer choice, high retail prices, and uneven household access to electricity. Proposals to restructure the industry had been considered before Arroyo assumed the presidency. A reform measure passed by both chambers during the administration of President Joseph Estrada remained unresolved in a bicameral conference committee. Arroyo subsequently made passage of the reform legislation part of her administration's economic programme.

The enacted measure consolidated House Bill No. 8457 and Senate Bills Nos. 1712, 1621, 1943, and 2000. The House of Representatives passed the consolidated measure on May 31, 2001, followed by the Senate on June 4. Arroyo approved it on June 8.

== Provisions ==
=== Industry structure ===
EPIRA divided the electric power industry into four sectors:

- Generation – the production of electricity. The act declared generation a competitive and open business affected with public interest but not a public-utility operation. New generating companies must obtain certificates of compliance from the ERC and meet applicable technical, financial, environmental, health, and safety requirements.
- Transmission – the conveyance of electricity through the high-voltage national grid. Transmission was designated a regulated common-carrier business subject to open and non-discriminatory access and ERC-approved rates.
- Distribution – the conveyance of electricity through local distribution systems to end-users. Distribution remains a regulated public utility requiring a legislative franchise.
- Supply – the sale of electricity to end-users in the contestable market. Suppliers must obtain licences from the ERC and demonstrate technical and financial capability.

The act required electric-power participants to separate their business functions and unbundle their rates. Retail electricity bills were consequently divided into components such as generation, transmission, distribution, supply, and other charges.

EPIRA also imposed restrictions on cross-ownership and prohibited price manipulation, cross-subsidization, cartelization, and other anti-competitive conduct. A company or related group was generally prohibited from controlling more than 30 percent of the installed generating capacity of a grid or 25 percent of national installed generating capacity.

=== Institutional restructuring and privatization ===
The act created TransCo to receive NPC's transmission and subtransmission assets, and operate, maintain, and expand the national grid upon NPC's turnover to the latter on March 1, 2003 until January 15, 2009 pending the privatization of the government's duties and responsibilities to the grid. EPIRA authorized PSALM to award transmission operations through an outright sale or concession, while requiring open and non-discriminatory access to the grid.

Through the implementation of RA 9511 and a congressional franchise of 25 years renewable for another 25 years for a total of 50 years signed on December 1, 2008, TransCo turned over the power grid to the privately owned National Grid Corporation of the Philippines (NGCP) on January 15, 2009, transferring it from government to private sector.

Since January 15, 2009, operations, maintenance, and eminent domain of the grid is in the private sector where it is being operated and maintained by NGCP, with rights-of-ways (ROWs) or grid portions, and components both entirely new or secondhand that abandoned their pre-concession period original designation or usage and government ownership (NPC and TransCo-era) and their exact lands or locations acquired and designated from the said date will have their temporary NGCP private ownership, as provided on NGCP's franchise (Republic Act 9511) and concession agreement where it is authorized to exercise the right of eminent domain necessary for the construction, expansion, and efficient maintenance and operation of the transmission system and grid and the efficient operation and maintenance of the subtransmission systems which have not yet been disposed by TransCo thus NGCP acts as the temporary owner of them and they will be transferred to TransCo once the NGCP concession period ends or is revoked, applying the build–own–operate–transfer (BOOT) model.

Those before the turnover date, however, remains with the national government through TransCo as its one mandate to handle all existing cases, including right-of-way and claims which accrued prior to the transfer of power grid to NGCP, and to comply with the EPIRA and TransCo's concession agreement with NGCP regarding their ownership. Portions with acquisition and designation made before the turnover to TransCo on March 1, 2003 are titled under or using the name of NPC with continued and transferred ownership by TransCo. As such, portions of the grid before the said date of January 2009 are handled by TransCo's Right of Way and Legal Group, and NGCP only has granted the right to operate, maintain and construct them where build-operate-transfer (BOT) or build-lease-transfer (BLT) are applied without giving temporary private ownership. As such, the grid currently has temporary dual or separated government and private ownership since the handover where TransCo owns the pre-privatization era portions while NGCP during its operational period.

PSALM was created to take ownership of NPC's generating assets, liabilities, real estate, and contracts with independent power producers. It was directed to privatize disposable NPC assets and use the proceeds, together with other authorised revenues, to liquidate NPC's debts and stranded contract costs.

The law abolished the Energy Regulatory Board and replaced it with the ERC, an independent quasi-judicial regulatory body. The ERC retained rate-setting and service-regulation functions and received additional authority over competition, electricity-market rules, consumer complaints, market-power abuse, and the technical and financial performance of industry participants.

=== Wholesale and retail markets ===
EPIRA directed the Department of Energy (DOE), in cooperation with industry participants, to establish WESM. The market provides a venue for trading electricity that is not covered by bilateral supply contracts. Its pricing methodology and market rules are subject to ERC approval.

The act also provided for Retail Competition and Open Access (RCOA). Under RCOA, qualified end-users form part of the contestable market and may contract with a licensed retail electricity supplier instead of purchasing all their electricity from the distribution utility serving their area. Initial implementation was conditioned on the establishment of WESM, the unbundling of transmission and distribution charges, the initial removal of cross-subsidies, and specified levels of privatization of NPC generating assets and independent-power-producer contracts.

=== Consumer charges and protections ===
Section 34 established a non-bypassable universal charge collected from electricity end-users. The charge may be used for authorised purposes including the recovery of approved stranded debts and contract costs, missionary electrification, equalization of taxes and royalties on indigenous and renewable energy, watershed rehabilitation, and the phase-out of cross-subsidies.

The act also created a lifeline rate, a socialized pricing mechanism for marginalized electricity consumers. The ERC was tasked with setting the applicable consumption level and rate. Subsequent laws extended and revised the lifeline-rate programme.

== Implementation ==
The implementing rules and regulations of EPIRA were approved on February 27, 2002. WESM began commercial operation in Luzon on June 26, 2006, and the Visayas was integrated into the market on December 26, 2010. RCOA commenced commercial operation on June 26, 2013.

Implementation took longer than the original statutory schedules. A 2019 World Bank case study characterized the reform as substantial and largely complete by 2013, when retail competition became available to large consumers in Luzon and the Visayas, but noted that several parts of the programme had been delayed. In September 2018, the Independent Electricity Market Operator of the Philippines assumed the market-operator functions of WESM.

== Assessments and criticism ==
A 2018 Philippine Institute for Development Studies policy note found that electricity supply had generally been adequate after EPIRA and that real electricity prices had shown a broadly declining trend over part of the post-reform period. It nevertheless identified unfinished reforms, including incomplete removal of cross-subsidies and the limited development of a competitive retail market.

An earlier PIDS study found that real electricity prices increased during the 2001–2005 transition and declined slightly following the introduction of spot-market trading, but remained above pre-EPIRA levels. The study argued for improved implementation rather than repeal, including stronger regulation, better energy planning, and an independent market operator.

A 2015 study of WESM prices from 2006 to 2010 found no statistically significant relationship between changes in measured market concentration and electricity prices during the period examined. It found, however, that tight electricity supply could permit substantial increases in spot-market prices.

Other researchers have questioned whether liberalization created sufficient competition. A 2020 political-economy study argued that privatization replaced a government monopoly with a private oligopolistic structure and contributed to increased investment in coal-fired generation. A 2023 Ateneo de Manila University working paper similarly observed that, two decades after restructuring, Philippine electricity rates remained among the highest in the region and attributed the result to several factors in the industry's structure and electricity-tariff composition.

A 2025 policy brief from the University of the Philippines Center for Integrative and Development Studies attributed continuing barriers to competition to the high capital requirements of power projects, limited transmission access, and regulatory complexity. It recommended amendments intended to lower barriers to entry and strengthen competition.

== Legal challenges ==
In Gerochi v. Department of Energy (2007), electricity consumers challenged the universal charge under Section 34 as an unconstitutional tax and an improper delegation of legislative authority to the ERC. The Supreme Court upheld the provision, ruling that the charge was a regulatory exaction imposed through the state's police power rather than a tax and that EPIRA supplied sufficient standards to guide the ERC.

In Kapisanan ng mga Kawani ng Energy Regulatory Board v. Barin (2007), former Energy Regulatory Board employees challenged the abolition of their agency and its replacement by the ERC. The Supreme Court dismissed the petition, finding that the ERC had substantially new and expanded functions and that the abolition of the former board was valid.

In a ruling publicized in January 2025, the Supreme Court upheld Sections 6 and 29, which declare electricity generation and supply to the contestable market to be non-public-utility operations. The Court clarified that generation and supply companies remained businesses affected with public interest and were still subject to ERC regulation under EPIRA.

== Amendments and proposed revisions ==
Republic Act No. 10150, approved on June 21, 2011, amended Section 73 by extending the lifeline rate for marginalized end-users to a total period of 20 years. Republic Act No. 11552, approved on May 27, 2021, further extended the programme for 50 years and revised the eligibility and validation requirements for qualified marginalized end-users.

Republic Act No. 12179 lapsed into law on April 18, 2025. It amended Section 50 to extend PSALM's corporate existence for ten years beyond the expiration of its original term on June 26, 2026. During the extension, PSALM is generally prohibited from collecting stranded costs and stranded debts from consumers, except for charges already approved by the ERC before the amendment's enactment.

Broader proposals to revise EPIRA have continued. In July 2026, President Bongbong Marcos called on Congress to amend the law and prohibit distribution utilities from passing system-loss charges, including the associated value-added tax, to electricity consumers. Members of the Senate subsequently expressed support for reviewing EPIRA and considering measures involving system-loss charges, regulatory oversight, and electricity costs.

== See also ==
- Electricity sector in the Philippines
- Energy Regulatory Commission (Philippines)
- National Power Corporation
- National Transmission Corporation
- National Grid Corporation of the Philippines
- Renewable energy in the Philippines
- Energy policy of the Philippines
