= Regina Reyes Mandanas =

Filipina politician (1964-2022)

Regina Ongsiako Reyes
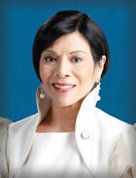
- Official portrait during the 16th Congress

Member of the Philippine House of Representatives from the Marinduque's lone district
- In office June 30, 2013 – January 12, 2016
- Preceded by: Lord Allan Velasco
- Succeeded by: Lord Allan Velasco

First Lady of Batangas
- In role June 30, 2016 – May 5, 2022
- Governor: Hermilando Mandanas
- Preceded by: Ralph Recto
- Succeeded by: Vacant (Later held by Angelica Chua)
- In role June 30, 1995 – June 30, 2004
- Governor: Hermilando Mandanas
- Preceded by: Ma. Sonia Mayo
- Succeeded by: Edna Sanchez

Personal details
- Born: Regina Ongsiako Reyes; July 3, 1964 Manila, Philippines
- Died: May 5, 2022 (aged 57) Makati, Philippines
- Party: Anakalusugan (until 2022); Liberal (2012–2016)
- Domestic partner: Hermilando Mandanas
- Parents: Edmundo Reyes, Sr. (deceased) (father); Carmencita O. Reyes (deceased) (mother)
- Relatives: Sandro Reyes (nephew)
- Education: Georgetown University (BS); Ateneo de Manila University (LL.B)
- Website: www.yesmarinduque.com

Regina Ongsiako Reyes-Mandanas (July 3, 1964 – May 5, 2022) was a Filipina politician who served as the Representative of Marinduque's lone district from 2013 to 2016. She was also the wife of Batangas governor Hermilando Mandanas. Her parents were former Bureau of Immigration commissioner Edmundo Reyes Sr. and Marinduque governor Carmencita O. Reyes.

== Early life and career ==
Regina Ongsiako Reyes was twice accelerated in her primary and secondary school. A consistent Dean's Lister, she finished her Foreign Service degree at Georgetown University. She then studied at the Ateneo Law School, where she graduated in the honor roll. After passing the Philippine Bar Examination, she served in government and worked as a solicitor at the Office of Solicitor General. She was the youngest solicitor in history, and also took advanced studies in Comparative Law.

== Advocacies ==
She was a devoted member of the Special Projects Group of Gawad Kalinga and was engaged in supporting rehabilitation centers for abused and neglected children, disaster management and relief operations, and volunteer recruitment. Reyes also joined Answering the Cry of the Poor Foundation (USA) Inc., better known as ANCOP U.S.A., and helped empower poor Filipino families by providing them with shelter and livelihood programs and promoting a culture of health consciousness.

== Political career ==
She was the provincial administrator of Marinduque for almost two years. During her term, she has been very active in program implementation by the Provincial Government of Marinduque particularly programs by the Provincial Social Welfare Development Office (PSWDO) on gender, women, children, and senior citizens and the Provincial Nutrition Office (PNO) on barangay nutrition scholars and supplemental feedings for malnourished children. She was also active in fighting against irresponsible mining and provided jobs to the affected community.

In May 2013, Reyes gained almost 4,000 votes more than her opponent Lord Allan Velasco. She was proclaimed as the winner by the Marinduque COMELEC Provincial Board of Canvassers and subsequently took her oath of office before President Benigno S. Aquino III and House Speaker Feliciano Belmonte in Malacañang as the duly elected representative of the Lone District of Marinduque.

As a member of the 16th Congress, she was the vice-chairwoman of the House Committee on National Defense and Security. She was also a member of several committees, which include the committees on Appropriations, Justice, Health, Natural Resources, Veterans Affairs and Welfare, Suffrage and Electoral Reforms, Youth and Sports Development, Higher and Technical Education, Overseas Workers Affairs, Public Order and Safety, and Women and Gender Equality.

== Death ==
Reyes-Mandanas died on 5 May 2022 at Makati Medical Center due to sepsis. She was admitted to the hospital and underwent leg amputation because of a bacterial infection affecting her right foot.
