= Reynaldo Umali =

Filipino politician (1957–2021)

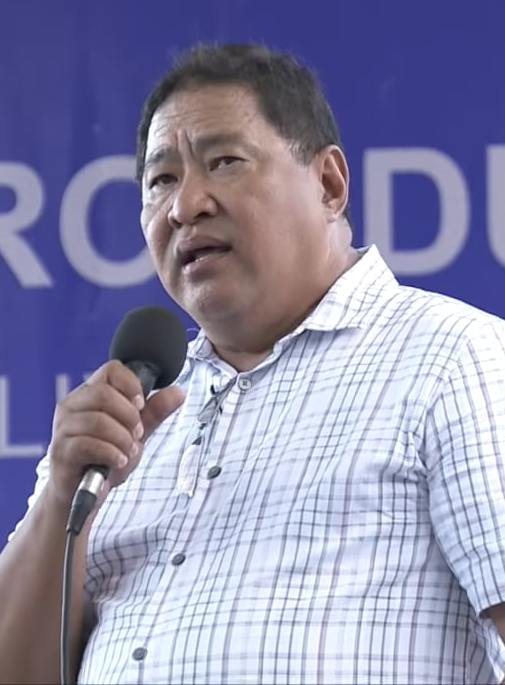
- Umali in 2018

Member of the Philippine House of Representatives from Oriental Mindoro's 2nd district
- In office June 30, 2010 – June 30, 2019
- Preceded by: Alfonso Umali Jr.
- Succeeded by: Alfonso Umali Jr.

Personal details
- Born: Reynaldo Villar Umali; February 26, 1957 Quezon City, Philippines
- Died: January 7, 2021 (aged 63) Taguig, Philippines
- Party: PFP (2018–2021)
- Other political affiliations: Liberal (2009–2016); PDP–Laban (2016–2018)
- Spouse: Ma. Linda Tantoco
- Children: 6
- Education: San Beda University (LL.B.)
- Occupation: Politician
- Profession: Lawyer

Reynaldo Villar Umali (February 26, 1957 – January 7, 2021) was a Filipino politician who served in the House of Representatives of the Philippines from 2010 to 2019 representing the 2nd district of Oriental Mindoro. He ran for governor of Oriental Mindoro during the 2019 Philippine gubernatorial elections but lost to Humerlito Dolor.

== Early life and education ==
Umali was born on February 26, 1957, in Quezon City to Alfonso Umali Sr., a governor of Oriental Mindoro, and Alberta Villar-Umali. He is the brother of Representatives Alfonso Umali Jr. and Ma. Victoria Umali of A Teacher Partylist.

Umali attended San Beda University for his elementary and secondary education. He earned his Bachelor of Arts in Economics degree from Ateneo de Manila University and his Bachelor of Laws degree from Manuel L. Quezon University. He also studied at the University of Southern California in Los Angeles where he obtained a certificate program in Executive Management.

He passed the Philippine Bar Examination in 1988 and was a member of the Lambda Rho Beta fraternity.

== Career ==
Umali was a practicing lawyer before he entered government service. His first government job was at the National Economic and Development Authority where he worked as an economist and division chief. He also worked for former Representative Gerardo Cabochan of Caloocan as his legislative chief of staff. He served as the director of the Presidential Agrarian Reform Council Secretariat from 1990 to 1992. From 2005 to 2010, he worked at the Bureau of Customs as its legal office chief and as deputy commissioner. During his term as Customs Deputy Commissioner, he and his team drafted the Customs Modernization and Tariff Act. He was also the executive director of the bureau's Run After the Smugglers (RATS) program.

=== Congressman ===
Umali was first elected to Congress in 2010 Defeating Former Vice Governor Thaddeus Ventura Under The Liberal Party He replaced his brother who was in his third consecutive term and was ineligible to run. During his term in the 15th Congress, he was the vice chairman of the House Committees on Constitutional Amendments, Good Governance and Public Accountability, Justice, and Ways and Means; and member of the Committees on Appropriations, Aquaculture and Fisheries Resources, Games and Amusements, Information and Communications Technology, National Cultural Communities, Social Services, Suffrage and Electoral Reforms, and Tourism. He also pushed for the impeachments of former Ombudsman Merceditas Gutierrez and Chief Justice Renato Corona. During the Corona impeachment trial, he was a member of the prosecution team and was the lead prosecutor of the 8th article of impeachment.

Umali ran for a second term in 2013 again under the Liberal Party where he became the deputy spokesperson of the party's National Political Council. During the 16th Congress, he was chair of the House Committee on Energy and co-chair of the Joint Congressional Power Commission.

In the 2016 House of Representatives elections, Umali still ran under the Liberal Party. However, in July 2016, he left the party and joined the ruling PDP–Laban of President Rodrigo Duterte. During the 17th Congress, he was the chair of the House Committee on Justice that tackled the impeachment proceedings of then-Chief Justice Maria Lourdes Sereno and the investigation regarding the New Bilibid Prison drug trafficking scandal. Being the Justice Committee chair, he also served as an ex-officio member of the Judicial and Bar Council.

After serving three consecutive terms in Congress, Umali was barred from running another term. In the 2019 gubernatorial elections, he ran as governor of Oriental Mindoro under the Partido Federal ng Pilipinas but lost to PDP–Laban candidate Humerlito Dolor. And Antonio Perez Jr.

== Personal life and death ==
Umali was married to Ma. Linda Tantoco-Umali and had six children. His Son Jean Paulo "Pau" Umali is Currently Serving As A Board Member Of The 2nd District Of Oriental Mindoro

On December 12, 2020, Umali went for a medical check-up following previous visits that had diagnosed him with having fatty liver disease. During that check-up, Umali tested positive for COVID-19 and was also found to have Stage 3 liver cancer. After a few days, his condition aggravated into Stage 4 liver cancer and he was later admitted to the intensive care unit on December 21. On December 26, he was intubated and on the morning of January 7, 2021, he went into cardiac arrest and died.
