= Mel Go =

Filipino politician

The Honorable Mel Go
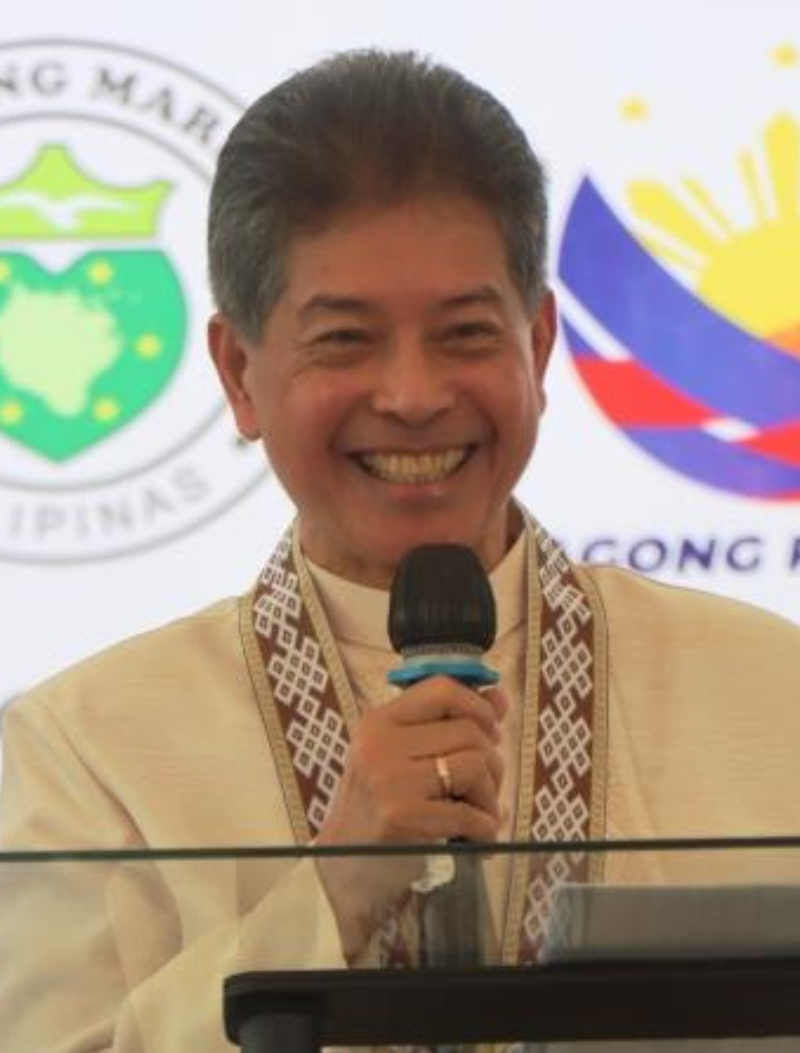

Governor of Marinduque
- Incumbent
- Assumed office June 30, 2025
- Vice Governor: Romulo Baccoro Jr.
- Preceded by: Presbitero Velasco

Member of the Marinduque Provincial Board from the 1st District
- In office June 30, 2010 – June 30, 2013
- In office June 30, 2004 – June 30, 2007

Personal details
- Born: May 23, 1954 (age 72) Boac, Marinduque, Philippines
- Party: PDP (2024–present)
- Other political affiliations: Independent (2004–2024)
- Spouse: Sylvia Tanya Go
- Occupation: Politician

Melecio "Mel" Jinang Go (born May 23, 1954) is a Filipino politician who has served as Governor of Marinduque since 2025. He was a civil servant and entrepreneur.

== See also ==
- List of current Philippine governors
