= Carmencita Reyes =

Filipina politician and jurist (1931-2019)

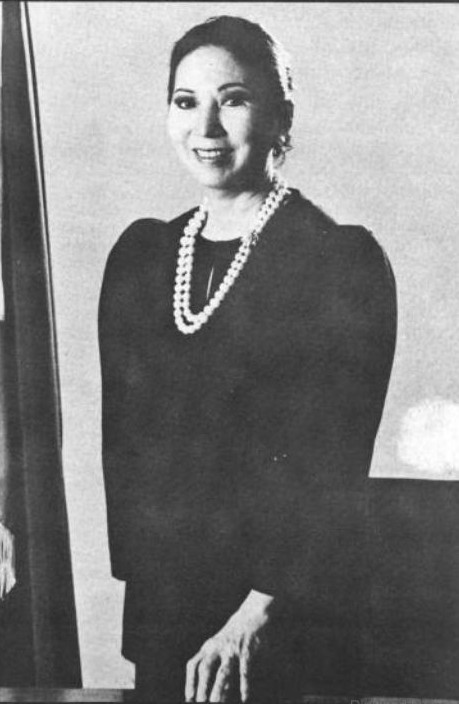
- Reyes official portrait during the 8th Congress.

Governor of Marinduque
- In office June 30, 2010 – January 7, 2019
- Vice Governor: Antonio Uy Jr. (2010–2013); Romulo Bacorro Jr. (2013–2019)
- Preceded by: Jose Antonio Carrion
- Succeeded by: Romulo Bacorro Jr.
- In office June 30, 1998 – June 30, 2007
- Vice Governor: Teodorito Rejano (1998–2004); Andy Palma (2004–2007)
- Preceded by: Jose Antonio Carrion
- Succeeded by: Jose Antonio Carrion

Member of the Philippine House of Representatives from Marinduque
- In office June 30, 2007 – June 30, 2010
- Preceded by: Edmundo O. Reyes
- Succeeded by: Lord Allan Jay Q. Velasco
- In office June 30, 1987 – June 30, 1998
- Preceded by: Post created
- Succeeded by: Edmundo O. Reyes

Mambabatas Pambansa (Assemblywoman) from Marinduque
- In office June 30, 1984 – March 25, 1986

Mambabatas Pambansa (Assemblywoman) from Region IV-A
- In office June 12, 1978 – June 5, 1984

Personal details
- Born: Carmencita de la Paz Ongsiako; November 9, 1931 San Juan, Rizal, Philippine Islands
- Died: January 7, 2019 (aged 87) Manila, Philippines
- Resting place: The Heritage Park, Bonifacio Global City, Taguig, Metro Manila, Philippines
- Party: UNA (2018–2019); Bigkis (2009–2019)
- Other political affiliations: Liberal (2009–2018); Lakas (1992–2009); Independent (1986–1992); KBL (1978–1986)
- Spouse: Edmundo Reyes Sr. (m. 1959; died 2007)
- Children: 2, including Regina (deceased)
- Relatives: Sandro Reyes (grandson)
- Education: University of Santo Tomas
- Occupation: Teacher
- Profession: Politician

Carmencita de la Paz Ongsiako-Reyes (November 9, 1931 – January 7, 2019) was a Filipina politician and jurist who served as governor of Marinduque from 2010 until her death in 2019, a position she had previously held from 1998 to 2007.

She was also a member of the House of Representatives representing Marinduque from 1987 to 1998 and again from 2007 to 2010, and served as an assemblywoman in the Interim and Regular Batasang Pambansa from 1978 to 1986.

== Batasang Pambansa Assemblywoman ==
Reyes won a seat in the Batasang Pambansa in 1984 under the ruling Kilusang Bagong Lipunan of President Ferdinand Marcos. Reyes was a close ally of the Marcos regime. Her husband, Edmundo M. Reyes, was appointed by President Marcos as the Commissioner on Immigration. Reyes served as an Assemblywoman until the 1986 People Power Revolution, which drove Marcos out of power.

Government offices
Preceded by Jose Antonio N. Carrion	Governor of Marinduque; 2010–2019; 1998–2007	Succeeded by Romulo Baccoro; Jose Antonio N. Carrion
House of Representatives of the Philippines
Preceded by Edmundo O. Reyes; Congress Restored	Representative, Lone District of Marinduque; 2007–2010; 1987–1998	Succeeded by Lord Allan Jay Q. Velasco; Edmundo O. Reyes
