= Legislative districts of Marinduque =

Legislative district of the Philippines

The legislative districts of Marinduque are the representations of the province of Marinduque in the various national legislatures of the Philippines. The province is currently represented in the lower house of the Congress of the Philippines through its lone congressional district.

== History ==
Marinduque initially had two representatives elected to the Malolos Congress in 1898; this remained so until 1899. It was later annexed to Tayabas as its sub-province in 1902 and was represented as part of the second district of Tayabas beginning in 1907. Upon Marinduque's establishment as a regular province on February 21, 1920 through Act No. 2880, Marinduque was regranted its separate representation, and elected one representative this time in 1922. When seats for the upper house of the Philippine Legislature were elected from territory-based districts between 1916 and 1935, Tayabas and Marinduque formed part of the fifth senatorial district which elected two out of the 24-member senate.

In the disruption caused by the Second World War, however, Marinduque was abolished and its municipalities were absorbed by Tayabas once again in 1942 by virtue of Executive Order No. 84. Thus, it became part of the at-large district of Tayabas during the National Assembly of the Japanese-sponsored Second Philippine Republic from 1945 to 1944. Upon the restoration of the Philippine Commonwealth in 1945, Marinduque's pre-war representation was retained; this remained so until 1972.

The province was represented in the Interim Batasang Pambansa as part of Region IV-A from 1978 to 1984, and elected one representative to the Regular Batasang Pambansa in 1984. Marinduque retained its lone congressional district under the new Constitution which took effect on February 7, 1987, and elected its member to the restored House of Representatives starting that same year.

== Current districts ==
Legislative Districts and Congressional Representatives of Marinduque
District	Current Representative	Party	Constituent LGUs	Population (2020)	Area
Lone	Reynaldo Salvacion (since 2025); Buenavista	Independent	List: Boac; Buenavista; Gasan; Mogpog; Santa Cruz; Torrijos	239,207	952.58 km^{2}

== Historical districts ==
=== At-Large (defunct) ===
==== 1898–1899 ====
Period	Representatives
Malolos Congress; 1898–1899	Ricardo Paras
Malolos Congress; 1898–1899	Julio Ruiz

==== 1984–1986 ====
Period	Representative
Regular Batasang Pambansa; 1984–1986	Carmencita O. Reyes

== See also ==
- Legislative districts of Tayabas
