= Governor of Marinduque =

Local chief executive

Provincial Governor of Marinduque
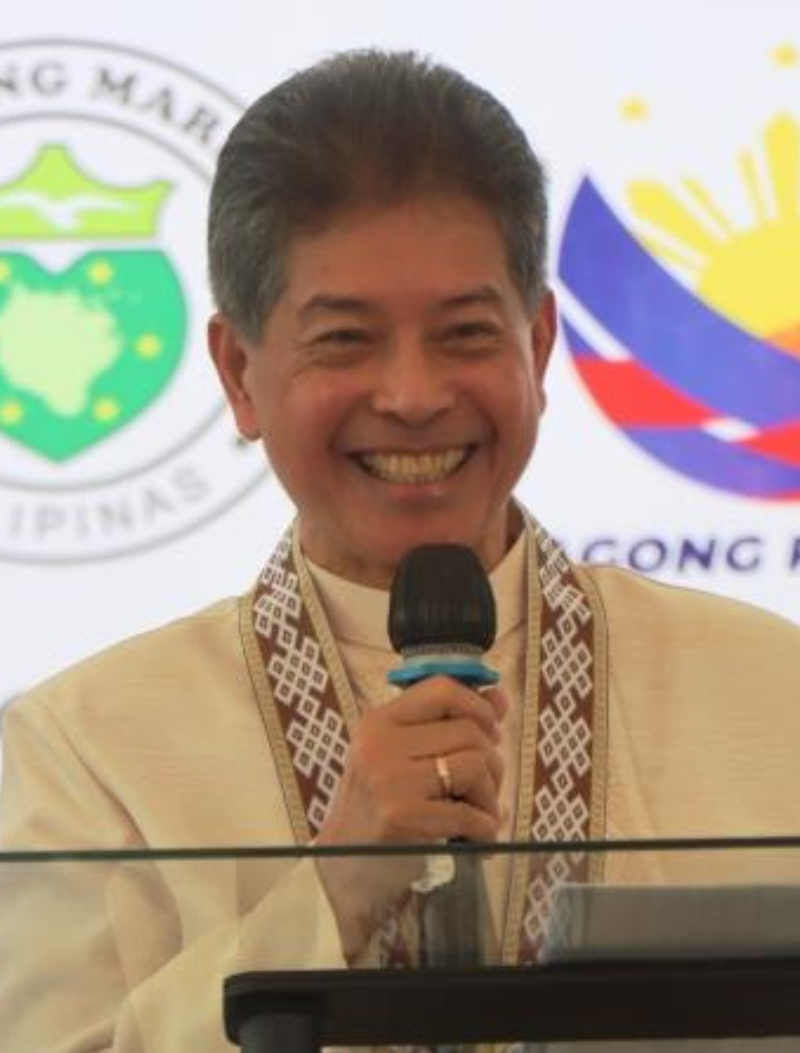
- Incumbent; Melecio J. Go since June 30, 2025
- Seat: Marinduque Provincial Capitol
- Appointer: Elected via popular vote
- Term length: 3 years
- Inaugural holder: Martin Lardizabal
- Formation: 1899
- Website: https://marinduque.gov.ph/executive/

The governor of Marinduque (Filipino: Punong Panlalawigan ng Marinduque), is the chief executive of the provincial government of Marinduque. Marinduque was a sub-province of Tayabas (now Quezon), which also has its own governor, until 1920. The governor holds office at the Marinduque Provincial Capitol in Boac.

== Provincial Governors (1899-present) ==
No.	Image	Governor	Term
1		Martin Lardizabal	1899-1901
2		Ricardo Paras	1901-1907 (Note: Concurrently served as Governor of the mother province of Tayabas from 1903 to 1904.)
3		Juan Nieva	1907-1916
4		Pedro Madrigal	1916-1919
5		Vicente Triviño	1919-1922
6		Miguel Villamayor	1922-1925
7		Damian Reyes	1925-1929
8		Leon Pelaez	1929-1933
9		Pedro del Mundo	1933-1936
(8)		Leon Pelaez	1936-1938
10		Ramon Reynoso	1938-1941
11		Jose L. Lopez	1941-1942
12		Ricardo Nepomuceno	1945-1946
13		Cesar Nepomuceno	1946-1951
14		Felix Fidel Paz	1951-1955
15		Miguel M. Manguera	1955-1963
16		Celso Preclaro	1963-1967
17		Aristeo M. Lecaroz	1967-1988
18		Luisito M. Reyes	1988-1995
19		Jose Antonio Carrion	1995-1998
20		Carmencita O. Reyes	1998-2007
(19)		Jose Antonio Carrion	2007-2010
(20)		Carmencita O. Reyes	2010-2019 (Note: Died in office)
21		Romulo A. Bacorro Jr.	2019
22		Presbitero J. Velasco Jr.	2019-2025
23		Melecio Go	2025-present

== See also ==
- List of vice governors of Marinduque
