= 2022 Philippine House of Representatives elections in Mimaropa =

- May 9, 2022
- All 8 Mimaropa seats in the House of Representatives
Party	Seats	+/–
PDP–Laban	3	+1
Liberal	1	−1
MBS	1	New
Nacionalista	1	0
PRP	1	New
PDDS	1	+1
This lists parties that won seats. See the complete results below.

The 2022 Philippine House of Representatives elections in Mimaropa were held on May 9, 2022.

== Summary ==
Congressional district	Incumbent	Incumbent's party	Winner	Winner's party	Winning margin
Marinduque	Lord Allan Velasco	PDP–Laban	Lord Allan Velasco	PDP–Laban	Unopposed
Occidental Mindoro	Josephine Sato	Liberal	Odie Tarriela	PDDS	20.08%
Oriental Mindoro–1st	Paulino Salvador Leachon	MBS	Arnan Panaligan	MBS	23.49%
Oriental Mindoro–2nd	Alfonso Umali Jr.	Liberal	Alfonso Umali Jr.	Liberal	11.05%
Palawan–1st	Franz Alvarez	NUP	Edgardo Salvame	PRP	9.57%
Palawan–2nd	Beng Abueg	Liberal	Jose Alvarez	PDP–Laban	19.27%
Palawan–3rd	Gil Acosta Jr.	PPPL	Edward Hagedorn	PDP–Laban	5.48%
Romblon	Eleandro Jesus Madrona	Nacionalista	Eleandro Jesus Madrona	Nacionalista	62.36%

== Marinduque ==
Incumbent Lord Allan Velasco of PDP–Laban won re-election for a third term unopposed.

Candidate	Party	Votes	%
Lord Allan Velasco (incumbent)	PDP–Laban	100,794	100.00
Total		100,794	100.00
Total votes		140,674	–
Registered voters/turnout		161,538	87.08
PDP–Laban hold			
Source: Commission on Elections

== Occidental Mindoro ==
Term-limited incumbent Josephine Sato of the Liberal Party ran for governor of Occidental Mindoro.

The Liberal Party nominated provincial board member Philip Ramirez, who was defeated by Odie Tarriela of Pederalismo ng Dugong Dakilang Samahan. Former Pasay treasurer Noli Leycano (Partido para sa Demokratikong Reporma), Occidental Mindoro vice governor Peter Alfaro (PDP–Laban) and two other candidates also ran for representative.

Candidate	Party	Votes	%
Odie Tarriela	Pederalismo ng Dugong Dakilang Samahan	92,864	38.64
Philip Ramirez	Liberal Party	44,607	18.56
Noli Leycano	Partido para sa Demokratikong Reporma	37,590	15.64
Peter Alfaro	PDP–Laban	36,948	15.37
Bunny Villarosa-Kalaw	Lakas–CMD	16,115	6.71
Jojo Melgar	Nationalist People's Coalition	12,191	5.07
Total		240,315	100.00
Total votes		263,453	–
Registered voters/turnout		313,427	84.06
PDDS gain from Liberal			
Source: Commission on Elections

== Oriental Mindoro ==
=== 1st district ===
Term-limited incumbent Paulino Salvador Leachon of Mindoro Bago Sarili (MBS) ran for governor of Oriental Mindoro. He was previously affiliated with PDP–Laban.

The MBS nominated Calapan mayor Arnan Panaligan, who won the election against Naujan mayor Mark Marcos (PDP–Laban) and Alvaro Eduardo (Independent).

Candidate	Party	Votes	%
Arnan Panaligan	Mindoro Bago Sarili	142,095	61.34
Mark Marcos	PDP–Laban	87,666	37.85
Alvaro Eduardo	Independent	1,879	0.81
Total		231,640	100.00
Total votes		256,084	–
Registered voters/turnout		312,393	81.97
MBS hold			
Source: Commission on Elections

=== 2nd district ===
Incumbent Alfonso Umali Jr. of the Liberal Party ran for a second term.

Umali won re-election against three other candidates.

Candidate	Party	Votes	%
Alfonso Umali Jr. (incumbent)	Liberal Party	82,761	44.46
Joanna Valencia	PDP–Laban	62,194	33.41
Anthony Yap	Aksyon Demokratiko	39,761	21.36
Mario Florencondia	Independent	1,437	0.77
Total		186,153	100.00
Total votes		208,354	–
Registered voters/turnout		251,735	82.77
Liberal hold			
Source: Commission on Elections

== Palawan ==
=== 1st district ===
Incumbent Franz Alvarez of the National Unity Party (NUP) was term-limited.

The NUP nominated Alvarez' father, former representative Antonio Alvarez, who was defeated by Edgardo Salvame of the People's Reform Party. Two other candidates also ran for representative.

Candidate	Party	Votes	%
Edgardo Salvame	People's Reform Party	107,750	47.35
Aca Alvarez	National Unity Party	85,964	37.78
Rica Reyes	Partido Federal ng Pilipinas	30,787	13.53
Toots Benipayo	Kilusang Bagong Lipunan	3,043	1.34
Total		227,544	100.00
Total votes		250,217	–
Registered voters/turnout		292,031	85.68
PRP gain from NUP			
Source: Commission on Elections

=== 2nd district ===
Incumbent Beng Abueg of the Liberal Party ran for a second term. She was previously affiliated with the Partidong Pagbabago ng Palawan.

Abueg was defeated by Palawan governor Jose Alvarez of PDP–Laban. Four other candidates, including Philippine Olympic Committee secretary general Edwin Gastanes (Independent), also ran for representative.

Candidate	Party	Votes	%
Jose Alvarez	PDP–Laban	99,081	51.77
Beng Abueg (incumbent)	Liberal Party	62,210	32.50
Pen Cascolan	Kilusang Bagong Lipunan	14,792	7.73
Edwin Gastanes	Independent	13,063	6.83
Rico Mejorada	Independent	1,153	0.60
Magnolia May de Leon	Independent	1,093	0.57
Total		191,392	100.00
Total votes		215,762	–
Registered voters/turnout		260,323	82.88
PDP–Laban gain from Liberal			
Source: Commission on Elections

=== 3rd district ===
Incumbent Gil Acosta Jr. of the Partidong Pagbabago ng Palawan ran for a second term.

Acosta was defeated by former Puerto Princesa mayor Edward Hagedorn of PDP–Laban.

Candidate	Party	Votes	%
Edward Hagedorn	PDP–Laban	80,325	52.74
Gil Acosta Jr. (incumbent)	Partidong Pagbabago ng Palawan	71,986	47.26
Total		152,311	100.00
Total votes		159,956	–
Registered voters/turnout		194,033	82.44
PDP–Laban gain from PPPL			
Source: Commission on Elections

== Romblon ==
Incumbent Eleandro Jesus Madrona of the Nacionalista Party ran for a second term.

Madrona won re-election against Joey Venancio (Aksyon Demokratiko).

Candidate	Party	Votes	%
Eleandro Jesus Madrona (incumbent)	Nacionalista Party	128,996	81.18
Joey Venancio	Aksyon Demokratiko	29,898	18.82
Total		158,894	100.00
Total votes		176,195	–
Registered voters/turnout		206,119	85.48
Nacionalista hold			
Source: Commission on Elections
