= San Fernando, Romblon =

Municipality in Romblon, Philippines

San Fernando
- Municipality
- Municipality of San Fernando
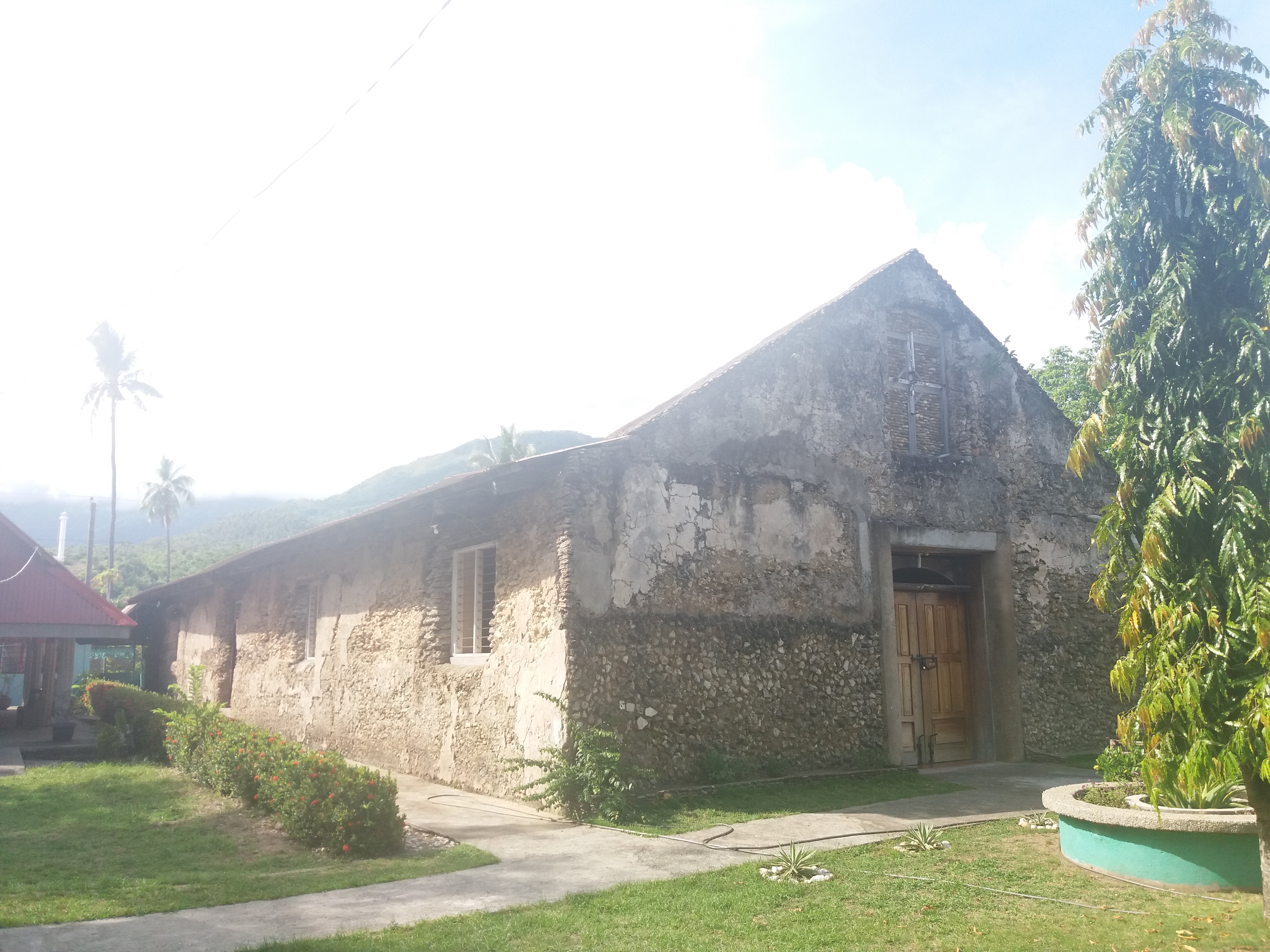

- Flag Seal

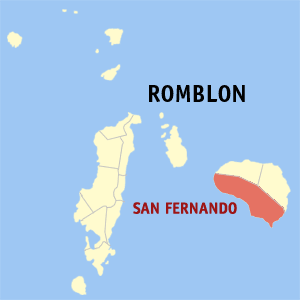
- Map of Romblon with San Fernando highlighted
- Interactive map of San Fernando
- Location within the Philippines
- Coordinates: 12°19′N 122°36′E
- Country: Philippines
- Region: Mimaropa
- Province: Romblon
- District: Lone district
- Founded: 1636
- Incorporated: January 1, 1947
- Barangays: 12 (see Barangays)

Government
  - Type: Sangguniang Bayan
  - Mayor: Fernando U. Marin
  - Vice Mayor: Domeng Marin
  - Representative: Eleandro Jesus F. Madrona
  - Councilors: Jezrel Aquino; Romel Repil; Cmyt Renion; Rodelio Relox; Dante Marin; Cynthia Rios; Dax Rios; Robert Relox
  - Electorate: 16,984 voters (2025)

Area
  - Total: 196.87 km^{2} (76.01 sq mi)
- Elevation: 28 m (92 ft)
- Highest elevation: 2,013 m (6,604 ft)
- Lowest elevation: 0 m (0 ft)

Population (2024 census)
  - Total: 23,660
  - Density: 120.2/km^{2} (311.3/sq mi)
  - Households: 5,641

Economy
  - Income class: 3rd municipal income class
  - Poverty incidence: 45.78% (2023)
  - Revenue: ₱ 261.4 million (2024)
  - Assets: ₱ 507 million (2024)
  - Expenditure: ₱ 227.4 million (2024)
  - Liabilities: ₱ 116.6 million (2024)

Service provider
  - Electricity: Romblon Electric Cooperative (ROMELCO)
- ZIP code: 5513
- PSGC: 1705913000
- IDD : area code: +63 (0)42
- Native languages: Romblomanon

San Fernando, officially the Municipality of San Fernando, is a municipality in the province of Romblon, Philippines. According to the 2024 census, it has a population of 23,660 people.

== Etymology ==
It was formerly known as Pueblo de Cauit. In 1882, the town was renamed to San Fernando, in honor of Ferdinand Magellan.

== History ==
=== Early history ===
The town of San Fernando was established in 1636 as Visita de Cauit in what is today Barangay Azagra. It is one of two visitas in Sibuyan Island, the other being Cajidiocan. In 1744, Cajiodiocan was turned into a pueblo (town) which included Visita de Cauit.

The first villages or barrios of Visita de Cauit were Pag-alad, Cangumba, Mabolo or San Roque, Canjalon, España or Canago, Agtiwa, Cangumon and Otod. After Romblon was made a separate district in 1853, and the local government reorganization of 1855, 17 new pueblos were created including Visita de Cauit. On 3 February 1868, Pueblo de Cauit was renamed Pueblo de Azagra. One of Azagra's villages, Visita de Pag-alad was renamed Visita de San Fernando in 1882, in honor of Ferdinand Magellan.

=== Modern era ===
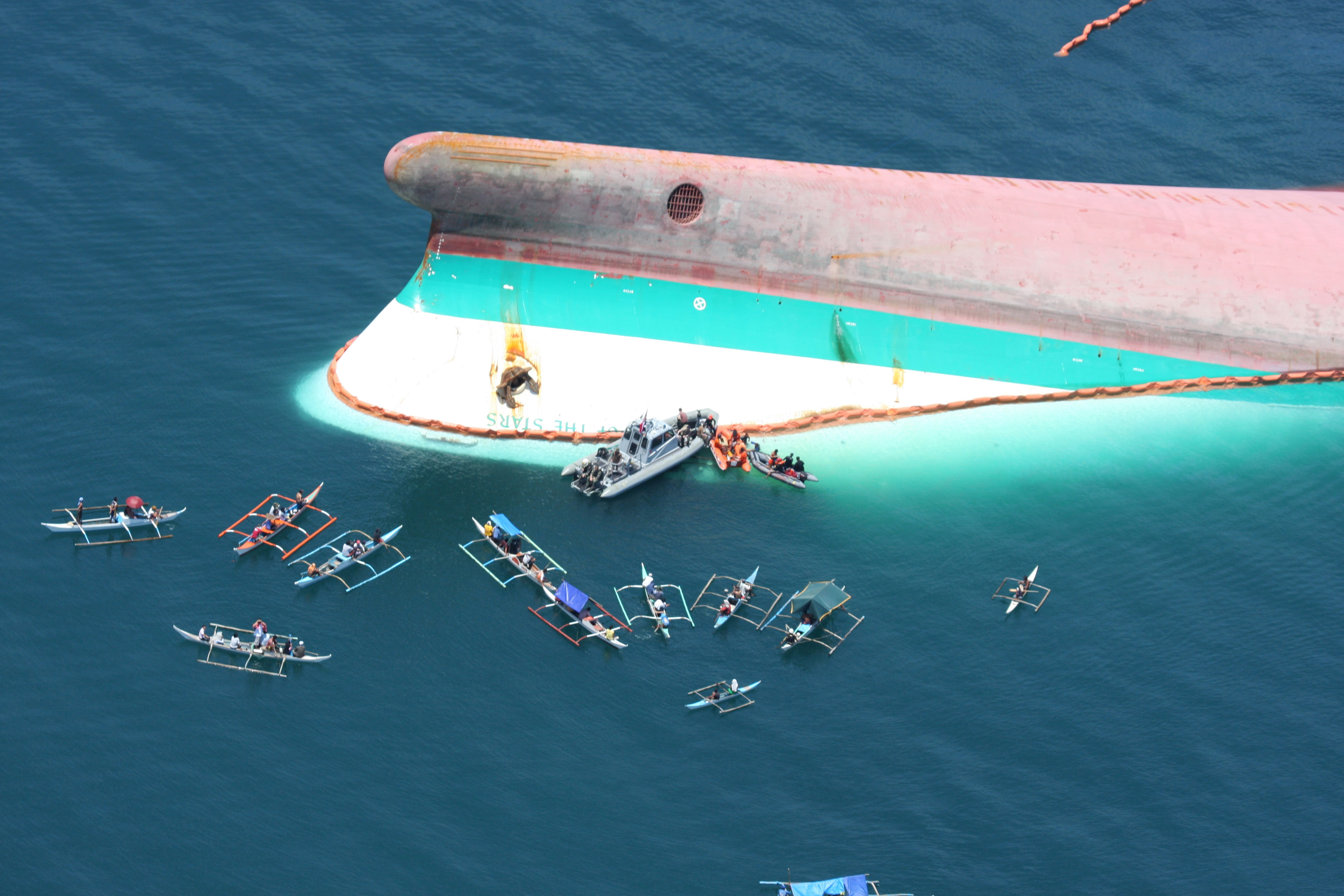
The bow of the capsized M/V Princess of the Stars.

When civilian government was introduced to the province by the Americans on 16 March 1901, Azagra was one of 11 new municipalities created. However, by the end of the year, the seat of the municipality was transferred from Azagra to San Fernando village, thereby, changing the town's name.

On 8 June 1940, the passage of Commonwealth Act No. 581, sponsored by Congressman Leonardo Festin, created the special municipality of Sibuyan. It abolished San Fernando and was annexed to the new town whose seat of government was in Cajidiocan. The special municipality of Sibuyan was abolished by Republic Act No. 38, authored by Congressman Modesto Formilleza and enacted on 1 October 1946. It effectively restored San Fernando into its former status as an independent municipality.

In 1958, San Fernando High School, the town's highest institution of learning was converted into a national school for arts and trades known as Romblon National Vocation School under Republic Act No. 2428.

On 21 June 2008, MV Princess of the Stars, the flagship inter-island ferry of Sulpicio Lines sank in the waters of San Fernando after during the onslaught of Typhoon Fengshen (locally known as Typhoon Frank). Of the ship's 862 passengers and crew, only 48 survived while 67 were confirmed dead and 747 remain missing. A massive search-and-rescue, and then recovery and salvage operation, took place in the waters of San Fernando to remove remaining dead bodies and potentially dangerous cargo from the sunken ship. The wreck of the MV Princess of the Star still remains in the town's coastal waters.

In July 2026, six councilors of San Fernando controversially voted in favor of a large-scale mining operation in Sibuyan island, leading to massive criticism nationwide. The approved Declaration of Mining Project Feasibility (DMPF) and mining operation application was for Altai Philippines Mining Corporation (APMC), owned by William Gatchalian, known for mining ventures that have destroyed livelihood and thousands of hectares of forests, seas, and farmlands throughout the Philippines. The six councilors who voted in favor of mining were Rene Baranda, Jezrel Aquino, Marcial Riano, Cynthia Rios, Dinggol Marin and IPMR (Indigenous Peoples Mandatory Representative) Celedonio Tamayo. All of the councilors were against mining before they were elected into office, but changed sides after being elected. Various groups, including indigenous groups, rallied towards the houses of the said councilors, demanding the councilors to revoke their votes and branding the councilors as traitors of Sibuyan. Only three councilors voted against mining, namely Daxie Benedict Rios, Marites Clavel, and Cedmarc Francis Renion, while two others were absent during the voting session. Various destructive mining companies have attempted to mine Sibuyan island, known as the Galapagos of Asia for its rich biological diversity and ecosystems, since 1972. Each generation of Sibuyan residents have consistently and continuously defended their ancestral homeland against mining companies that have killed numerous environmental Sibuyan heroes and defenders for decades.

== Geography ==
San Fernando is a coastal town which lies on the south-western portion of the Sibuyan Island and is the biggest among the three towns comprising the island, the other two being Magdiwang and Cajidiocan. It has a total land area of 190,608.231 km^{2} (73,594.249 sq mi). making it the largest municipality in the province, surpassing Odiongan by more than 11 km^{2} (4.2 sq mi). I The municipality has an irregular coastline broken by beautiful, long stretches of sandy beaches.

The municipality has high and steep mountain ranges as it is located at the foot of Romblon's tallest peak, Mount Guiting-Guiting. Other mountains are Mount Sibuyan and Mount Conico. Much of its territory is part of Mount Guiting-Guiting Natural Park made up of lush tropical rainforest where unique flora and fauna thrive, giving Sibuyan the nickname, "The Galapagos of the Philippines".

=== Climate ===
Climate data for San Fernando, Romblon
Month	Jan	Feb	Mar	Apr	May	Jun	Jul	Aug	Sep	Oct	Nov	Dec	Year
Mean daily maximum °C (°F)	28 (82)	29 (84)	30 (86)	32 (90)	32 (90)	31 (88)	30 (86)	30 (86)	29 (84)	29 (84)	29 (84)	28 (82)	30 (86)
Mean daily minimum °C (°F)	23 (73)	22 (72)	23 (73)	24 (75)	25 (77)	25 (77)	25 (77)	24 (75)	25 (77)	24 (75)	24 (75)	23 (73)	24 (75)
Average precipitation mm (inches)	47 (1.9)	33 (1.3)	39 (1.5)	48 (1.9)	98 (3.9)	150 (5.9)	169 (6.7)	147 (5.8)	163 (6.4)	172 (6.8)	118 (4.6)	80 (3.1)	1,264 (49.8)
Average rainy days	11.4	8.2	9.3	9.7	19.1	25.6	27.4	25.5	25.5	25.2	18.5	14.5	219.9
Source: Meteoblue (modeled/calculated data, not measured locally)

=== Barangays ===
San Fernando is politically subdivided into 12 barangays. Each barangay consists of puroks and some have sitios.

- Agtiwa
- Azagra
- Campalingo
- Canjalon
- España
- Mabini
- Mabulo
- Otod
- Panangcalan
- Pili
- Poblacion
- Taclobo

== Demographics ==
Population census of San Fernando

Year	Pop.	±% p.a.
1903	3,977	—
1918	5,602	+2.31%
1939	7,585	+1.45%
1948	8,697	+1.53%
1960	10,659	+1.71%
1970	13,448	+2.35%
1975	14,008	+0.82%
1980	14,778	+1.08%

Year	Pop.	±% p.a.
1990	17,768	+1.86%
1995	18,551	+0.81%
2000	21,214	+2.92%
2007	22,325	+0.71%
2010	22,466	+0.23%
2015	23,271	+0.67%
2020	24,171	+0.80%
2024	23,660	−0.51%

Source: Philippine Statistics Authority

According to the 2024 census, San Fernando has a population of 23,660, which makes San Fernando the 3rd most inhabited town in the province of Romblon.

=== Language ===
The variant Romblomanon language locally called Sibuyanon dialect (Sibuyanon Magdiwang-España Style) is the native language in 4 eastern barangays of the municipality, while the rest speaks Sibuyanon (Sibujanon Azagra-San Fernando Style). The town has a Majority of Catholics and a few INC, Born-again Christians, and other religions.

== Economy ==
Poverty incidence of San Fernando (%)

Source: Philippine Statistics Authority

The municipality has various establishments including general merchandise stores, construction and welding shops, furniture outlets, funeral homes, rice mills, bakeshops, catering services, and one cable TV station. Fishing and Agriculture provides the main source of livelihood for the residents in San Fernando. The Sibuyan Sea and Cresta de Gallo serve as a fishing grounds due to its abundant marine animals like mackerel, sea quartz, tuna, dilis, tanguigue, lapu-lapu, and tropical fish to name a few.The Agriculture sector of San Fernando is Mainly Rice and Corn Planting.

== Infrastructure ==
=== Utilities ===
National Power Corporation operates a 650-kW plant and 1,025-kW substation in San Fernando.It also have a Mini Hydro Power Plant in Cantingas.ROMELCO, the local electric cooperative, also implements power supply on the households. For its water supply, the town uses the Cantingas irrigation system, which services some 384 hectares of farmland. Some households depend on individual potable distribution which comes from jet pumps and springs.

=== Transportation and communication ===
Tricycles are always available to carry passengers to town center or to the other places on the island when a ship is scheduled to arrive.There are also plans to open charter flights in Azagra Airstrip in the Town.There are also pumpboats that docks in the port of the town centre going to Roxas City.There are also pumpboats travel from agtiwa to Romblon Island.

From Azagra jeepneys and tricycles are always available to carry passengers to town center or to the other places on the island when a ship is scheduled to arrive.There are also plans to open charter flights in Azagra Airstrip in the Town.There are also pumpboats that docks in the port of the town centre going to Roxas City.There are also pumpboats travel from agatiwa to Romblon Island

PLDT offers telecommunication services in San Fernando. Cellular phone services from Smart and Globe are available as well. Terrestrial and cable television services have become available too. The Sibuyan Circumferential Road is the main thoroughfare that traverses the coastline of San Fernando. This road connects San Fernando with the other Sibuyan Island towns of Cajidiocan and Magdiwang. Means of transportation include jeepneys, light vehicles, truck, motorcycles, and tricycles. Globe and Smart cellular also has 3G internet connection in San Fernando.

== Education ==
The San Fernando branch of Romblon State University offers a number of tertiary education courses for the local residents as well as students coming from all over the island. There are also 12 public elementary schools and two privately owned schools. There are also four government-ran secondary schools, and one privately owned school.

== Tourism ==
Because of its untouched mountainous landscape, several rivers, springs, falls, and freshwater lakes can be found in San Fernando. These include:

- Cresta de Gallo: A five-hectare kidney-shaped islet with verdant terrain sloping down to the powdery white sand beach and surrounded by beautiful corral reefs. The beach is rich with different species of marine life and an ideal place for swimming and scuba diving.
- Busay Falls: A scenic spot with a natural pool located some 2.5 kilometers from Poblacion at Barangay Panangcalan. The upper portion is the water reservoir serving the Poblacion.
- Cantingas River: The pride of Barangay Taclobo is a natural swimming pool with a crystal water. The river is odorless, tasteless, and ever-flowing cold where one could quench his thirst while swimming. It has a cottage with a conference hall.It was also awarded as cleaniest and greeniest river in the Philippines for the year 2003 and 2005.
- Lamao Lake: A seven-hectare natural lake in Barangay Azagra.
- Lagting Falls: This scenic hideaway with a basin-like natural pool is located in Barangay Taclobo, some 3 kilometers away from Poblacion. This falls is a refreshing place to immerse during this hot summer. It has two natural swimming pools with clean water and has several cottages available around the area
- Dagubdob Falls: A falls in Sitio Olango in Barangay Espana that is near in the mountain.
- Bila Bila Falls :A Beautiful Falls in Canjalon Named Bila Bila meaning Butterflies.

== Government ==
=== Local government ===
As a municipality in the Province of Romblon, government officials in the provincial level are voted by the electorates of the town. The provincial government have political jurisdiction over local transactions of the municipal government.

Pursuant to Chapter II, Title II, Book III of Republic Act 7160 or the Local Government Code of 1991, the municipal government is composed of a mayor (alkalde), a vice mayor (bise alkalde) and members (kagawad) of the legislative branch Sangguniang Bayan alongside a secretary to the said legislature, all of which are elected to a three-year term and are eligible to run for three consecutive terms.

Barangays are also headed by elected officials: Barangay Captain, Barangay Council, whose members are called Barangay Councilors. The barangays have SK federation which represents the barangay, headed by SK chairperson and whose members are called SK councilors. All officials are also elected every three years.

=== Elected officials ===
The incumbent mayor of San Fernando, Romblon, is Fernando "Nanding" Uy Marin and the incumbent vice mayor is Arben Rosas.

== Education ==
The San Fernando Schools District Office governs all educational institutions within the municipality. It oversees the management and operations of all private and public, from primary to secondary schools.

=== Primary and elementary schools ===
- Agtiwa Elementary School
- Azagra Elementary School
- Campalingo Elementary School
- Canjalon Elementary School
- España Elementary School
- Hillside View Academy
- Layag Cultural Minority School
- Mabini Elementary School
- Mabulo Elementary School
- Otod Elementary School
- San Fernando Elementary School
- Sibuyan Catholic School
- Sibuyan SDA Multigrade School
- Taclobo Elementary School
- Teresa Bernas Elementary School

=== Secondary schools ===
- Armin Rios-Marin National High School
- Azagra National High School
- Don Carlos M. Mejias Memorial National High School
- España National High School
