= Mayor of Odiongan =

Local chief executive of Manila, Philippines

- Banwa it Odiongan
- Incumbent; Roger Fodra since 30 June 2022
- Style: The Honorable (Formal)
- Seat: Odiongan, Romblon
- Appointer: Elected via popular vote
- Term length: 3 years, not eligible for re-election immediately after three consecutive terms
- Formation: current form: 1902
- Website: Bayan ng Odiongan

This is a comprehensive list of past and present local executives who, at least once, served the people of Odiongan, and San Andres and Ferrol when the latter two were still part of Odiongan.

Santiago Leaño y Gara and wife Tirsa Fortuna y Familara

Insular Government 1901-1935Commonwealth of the Philippines 1935-1946Province of Capiz 1907-1917Romblon provincial status restored 1917Special Municipality of Tablas 1940-1946Province of Capiz 1942-1946
Period	Mayor	Vice Mayor
1898-1899	Tomas Fiedacan	
1899	Felix Fronda	
1899-1901	Daniel V. Fortuna	
1901-1903	Eugenio Festin	
1904-1905	Emilio Firmalo	
1906-1908	Macario Fontamillas	
1908-1909	Luis Firmalo	
1909	Cipriano Manor	
1910-1911	Alejo Meñez	
1912-1916	Exequiel Fontamillas	
1916-1919	Santiago Leaño y Gara	
1919-1922	Hermenegildo Faminiano	
1922-1925	Paulino Fabon y Fetalino	
1925	Protacio Fabila	
1928-1931	Primo Fortuna	
1931-1934	Deogracias Fetalino y Fabella	
1934-1936	Jose Firmalo y Fetalino	
1937-1939	Francisco Famero	
1941-1942	Nestor Fabon	
1943-1944	Vicente Osorio	
1944-1947	Pablo Baculinao	
1948-1951	Nicolas Fernandez	
1952-1955	Conrado Meñez, Sr.	
1956-1958	Francisco Firmalo y Fetalino	
1958-1959	Regina Fabello y Firmalo	
1960-1963	Alfonso Firmalo y Fetalino	
1964-1967	Galicano Maulion y Macara	
1968-1971	Oscar Ylagan y Barredo	
1972-1980	Jose Firmalo y Fetalino	
1980-1986	Alfonso Firmalo y Fetalino	
1986-1987	Leopoldo Fabriquier y Fetalver	
1988	Juan Fortuna	
1988-1995	Perpetuo Ylagan y Barredo	
30 June 1995 - 30 June 1998	Jemly Fernandez y Hankins y Fajarito	John Andrew Reyes y Maulion
30 June 1998 - 30 June 2001	Jemly Fernandez y Hankins y Fajarito	John Andrew Reyes y Maulion
30 June 2001- 30 June 2004	Estanislao Famatiga	John Andrew Reyes y Maulion
30 June 2004 - 30 June 2007	Jemly Fernandez y Hankins	Brecio Fajutnao y Dalisay
30 June 2007 - 30 June 2010	Baltazar Firmalo y Llorca^{[a]}	Brecio Fajutnao y Dalisay
30 June 2010 - 30 June 2013	Baltazar Firmalo y Llorca^{[a]}	Brecio Fajutnao y Dalisay
30 June 2013 - 26 August 2015	Baltazar Firmalo y Llorca^{[a]}	Roger Fodra y Quijano
26 August 2015 - 30 June 2016	Roger Fodra y Quijano	Mark Anthony Reyes y Maulion
30 June 2016 - 30 June 2019	Trina Alejandra Firmalo y Que	Mark Anthony Reyes y Maulion
30 June 2019 - 30 June 2022	Trina Alejandra Firmalo y Que	Diven Dimaala y Fos
30 June 2022 - 30 June 2025	Trina Alejandra Firmalo y Que	Diven Dimaala y Fos
30 June 2025 - incumbent	Roger "Toto" Fodra y Quijano	Michael "Butchoy" Arevalo

^{a} Died in office.
^{b} Served in acting capacity.
^{c} Resigned.

== Family tree ==
Odiongan Mayors genealogy

Vicente Firmalo
Isabina Firmalo	Esteban Firmalo
Luis Firmalo (1908-1909)	Emilio Firmalo (1904-1905)	Silvino Fodra	Castor Firmalo	Honorata Famero	Alejo Meñez (1910-1911)
Jose Firmalo (1934-1936); Romblon Governor (1938-1940)	Alfonso Firmalo (1960-1963)	Francisco Firmalo (1956-1958)	Jose Fodra	Valentin Fodra	Vicente Fodra	Regina Firmalo (1958-1959)	Fortunato Fadri	Consorcia Formilleza	Vicente Meñez	Conrado Meñez (1952-1955)	Patria Meñez
Baltazar Firmalo (2007-2015)	Eduardo Firmalo, Romblon Representative (2004-2007); Romblon Governor (2010-2019)	Paquito Firmalo	Shirley Fodra	Roger Fodra, Sr.	Fraternidad Fodra	Pablo Fadri	Domingo de Juan	Zenaida Meñez	Estanislao Famatiga (2001-2004)
Trina Firmalo (2016-2025), Romblon Governor (2025-incumbent)	Roger "Toto" Fodra (2015-2016), (2025-incumbent)

== See also ==
- Odiongan, Romblon
- Province of Romblon
- Politics of the Philippines
