= Jose Riano =

Filipino politician (born 1967)

Jose R. Riano
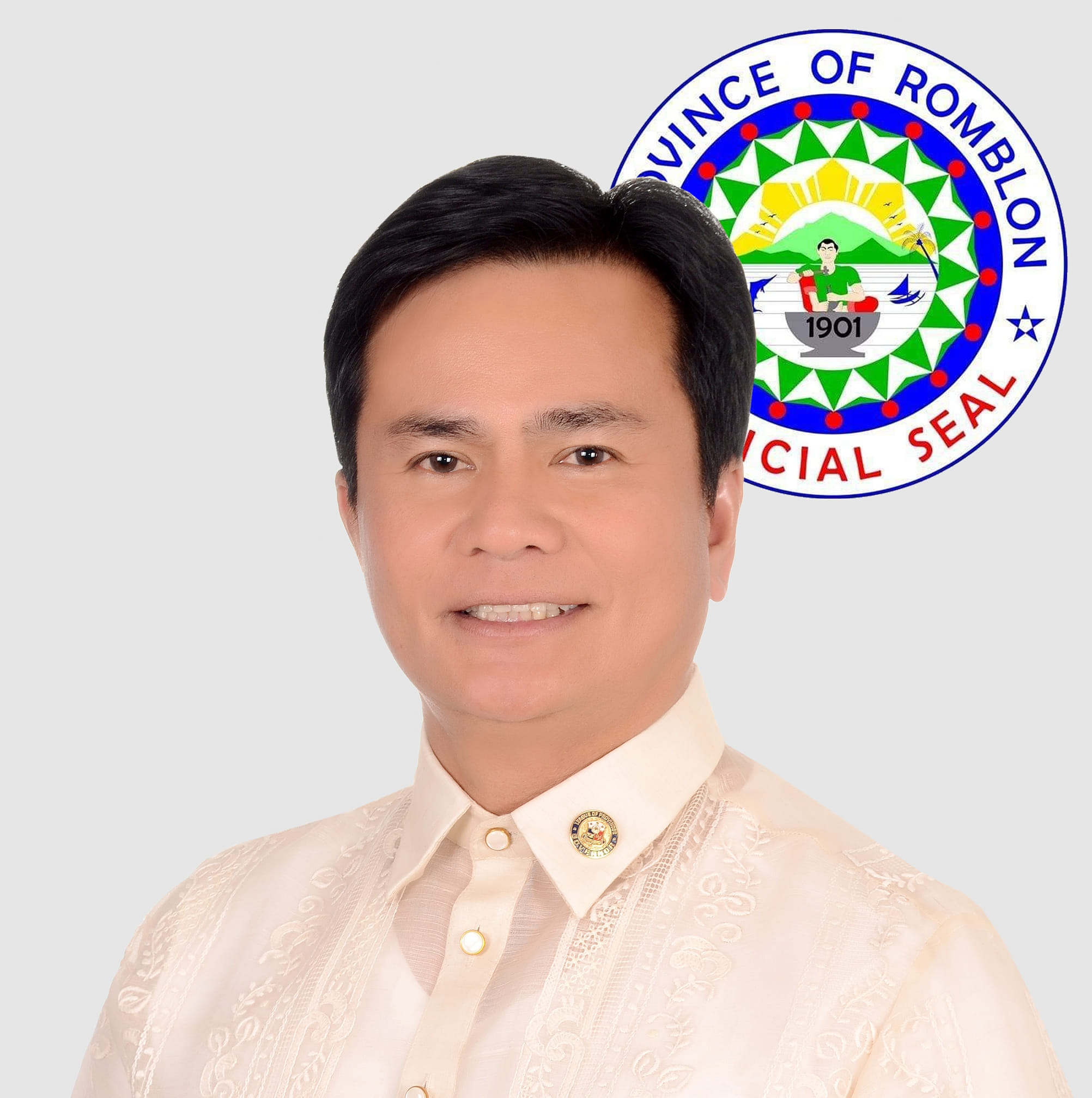
- Official portrait, 2022

Governor of Romblon
- In office June 30, 2019 – June 30, 2025
- Vice Governor: Felix Ylagan (2019–2022); Armando Gutierrez (2022–2025)
- Preceded by: Eduardo Firmalo
- Succeeded by: Trina Firmalo-Fabic

Vice Governor of Romblon
- In office June 30, 2013 – June 30, 2019
- Governor: Eduardo Firmalo

Personal details
- Born: Jose Ruado Riano; July 28, 1967 (age 59) Romblon, Romblon, Philippines
- Party: PFP (2024–present)
- Other political affiliations: PDP–Laban (2018–2024); Liberal (2012–2018)
- Spouse: Annabelle C. Riano
- Children: 3
- Education: Philippine College of Criminology
- Occupation: Businessman, Politician
- Nickname: Otik

Jose Ruado Riano (born July 28, 1967) is a Filipino politician from the Province of Romblon in the Philippines. He has served as the Governor of Romblon from 2019 to 2025. He previously served as the province's vice governor from 2013 to 2019.

== Political career ==
Jose Riano served as Vice Governor of Romblon for two terms from 2013 until 2019, under Governor Eduardo Firmalo. He is the only unopposed Vice Governor in the 2016 election and the first Vice Governor to be elected as Governor. He was also appointed by President Rodrigo Duterte as the chairman of Regional Development Council-MIMAROPA in October 2019. Riano was re-elected in the 2022 and won over his rival, former Governor Eduardo Firmalo.

Political Office
Preceded by Eduardo Firmalo	Governor of Romblon; 30 June 2019 - 30 June 2025	Succeeded by Trina Firmalo-Fabic
