= Gil Acosta Jr. =

Filipino lawyer and politician (born 1985)

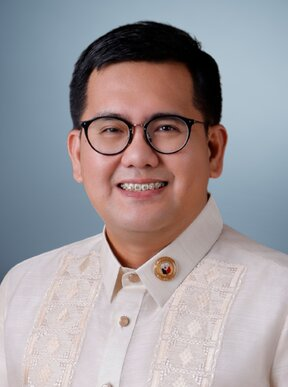
- Official portrait, 2025

Member of the House of Representatives from Palawan's 3rd District
- Incumbent
- Assumed office June 30, 2025
- Preceded by: Edward Hagedorn
- In office June 30, 2019 – June 20, 2022
- Preceded by: Gil P. Acosta Sr.
- Succeeded by: Edward Hagedorn

Personal details
- Born: Gil Abesamis Acosta Jr. May 10, 1985 (age 41) Puerto Princesa, Palawan, Philippines
- Party: NPC (2026–present); PPPL (local party; 2018–present)
- Other political affiliations: Lakas (2024–2026)
- Spouse: Michelle Marie Ricaza
- Education: Palawan State University (BS); Arellano University (LL.B.)
- Profession: Lawyer

Gil "Kabarangay" Abesamis Acosta Jr. (born May 10, 1985) is a Filipino lawyer and politician who has served as a member of the House of Representatives of the Philippines representing the 3rd District of Palawan since 2025, previously serving from 2019 to 2022.

== Early life and education ==
Gil Acosta Jr. was born on May 10, 1985, in Puerto Princesa. His father is former congressman Gil Acosta. He studied his elementary and secondary education at the Palawan State University Pilot School. He had his tertiary education at the Palawan State University and had a degree in Psychology. He took up law at the Arellano University. In 2013, Acosta passed the bar examination.

== Political career ==
Acosta was elected representative of Palawan's 3rd district in 2019, succeeding his father Gil P. Acosta. He is one of the 70 lawmakers who voted to reject the franchise of ABS-CBN.

In the 2022 elections, he ran under Partidong Pagbabago ng Palawan. He lost with 71,986 votes, 47.26 percent of the votes.

In the 2025 Philippine House of Representatives elections, Acosta ran under Lakas-CMD. Two other candidates ran against him. He won with 79,019 votes, beating Abraham Mitra by a few thousand votes.

== Electoral history ==
Electoral history of Gil Acosta Jr.
Year	Office	Party		Votes received				Result
Year	Office	Local	National	Total	%	P.	Swing	Result
2019	Representative (Palawan–3rd)	PPPL	—N/a	72,850	—N/a	1st	—N/a	Won
2022	Representative (Palawan–3rd)	PPPL	—N/a	71,986	47.26%	2nd	—N/a	Lost
2025	Representative (Palawan–3rd)	PPPL	Lakas	79,019	45.86%	1st	—N/a	Won
