= Governor of Romblon =

Local chief executive

- Gobernador ng Lalawigan ng Romblon (in Tagalog)
- Incumbent; Trina Firmalo-Fabic since 30 June 2025
- Style: Governor, Honorable Governor
- Residence: Romblon Capitol, Romblon, Romblon
- Term length: 3 years
- Inaugural holder: Don Ramon Vieytes
- Formation: 1853

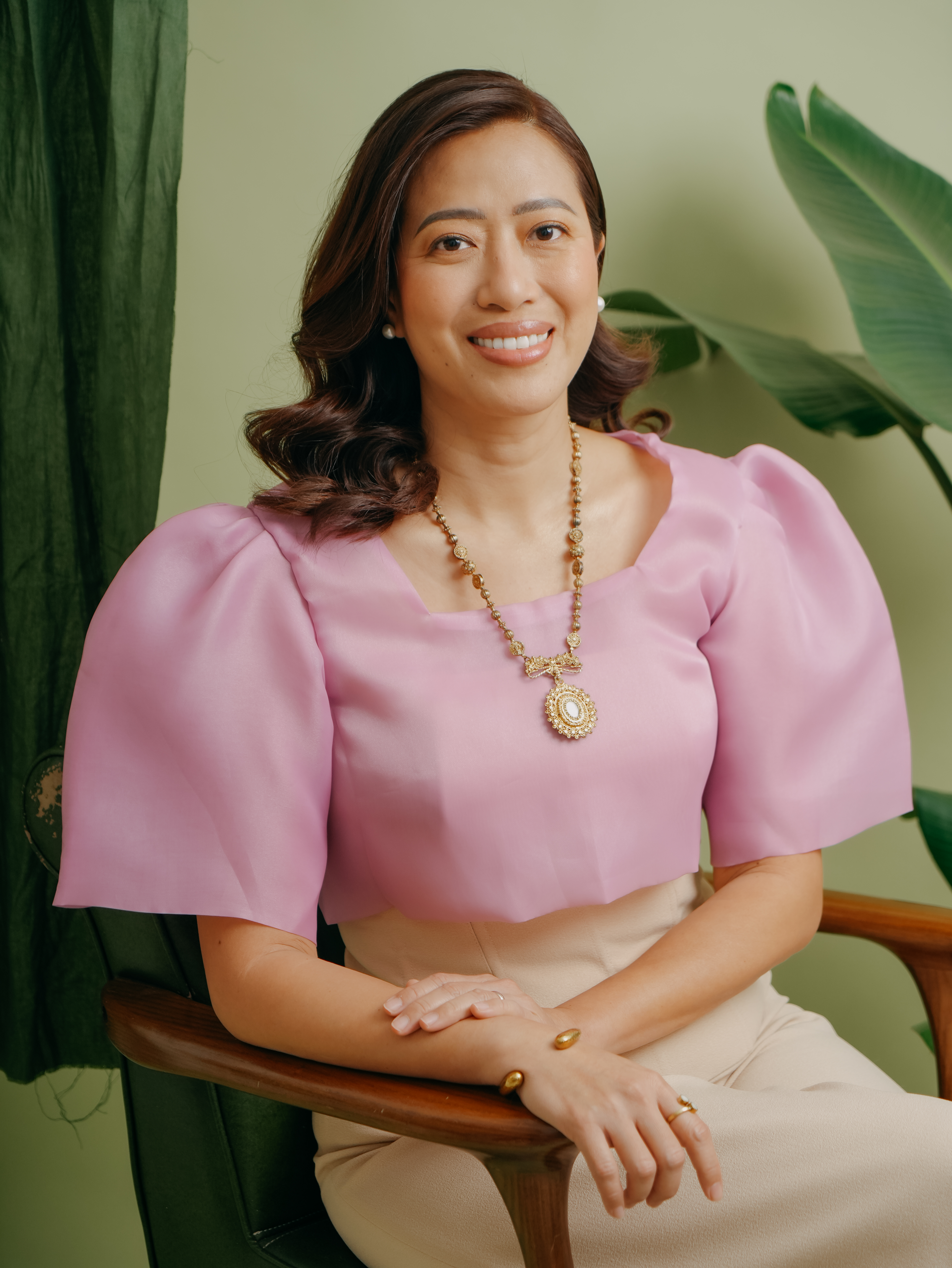
Trina Firmalo-Fabic is the governor of Romblon province (2025-present).

The Governor of Romblon is the local chief executive of the Philippine province of Romblon.

== List of governors of Romblon ==
Commandantes Infanteria de Politico Militar (1853-1868)Commandantes de Politico Militares (1868-1876)Governador de Politico Militares (1876-1898)
Order	Name	Year in Office	Notes	Vice Governor
1	Don Ramon Vieytes	1853 – 1854	Spanish governor	
2	Don Joaquin de Prat y Parella	1854 – 1856	Spanish governor	
3	Don Joaquin Vidal y Mallado	1856 – 1861	Spanish governor	
4	Don Juan Perez y Ravago	1861 – 1863	Spanish governor	
5	Don Eduardo Asuero y Soto	1863 - 1866	Spanish governor	
6	Don Joaquin Corillo	1866 – 1871	Spanish governor	
7	Don Jose Veza	1871 - 1876	Spanish governor	
8	Don Francisco Arespacochagan	1876 - 1880	Spanish governor	
9	Don Jose Fernandez de Terran	1880 - 1883	Spanish governor	
10	Don Carlos Valero y Valero	1883 - 1885	Spanish governor	
11	Don Luis Larella y Figueroa	1886 - 1888	Spanish governor	
12	Don Luis San Miguel (Acting)	July 1888	Spanish governor	
13	Don Casimero Perez Davila	1888 - 1890	Spanish governor	
14	Don Antonio Lejos (aka La Torre)	1890 - 1891	Spanish governor	
15	Don Manuel Hernandez y Herrera	1891 - 1893	Spanish governor	
16	Don Jose Cortes y Dominguez	1893 - 1895	Spanish governor	
17	Don Justo Cumplido y Montero	1896 - 1897	Spanish governor	
18	Don Carlos de Mendoza y Cerra	1897 - 1898	Spanish governor	

Governors of Romblon (1898-present)
Order	Name	Year in Office	Notes	Vice Governor
19	Wenceslao Molo	1898	appointed	
20	Francisco "Paco" Sanz y Perez	1899		
21	E. M. Johnson, 26th Major	16 March 1901	Appointed American governor	
22	Francisco "Paco" Sanz y Perez	13 August 1901 – 1903		
22	Francisco "Paco" Sanz y Perez	1903 - 1905		
23	Bonifacio Marron y Mayor	1905 - 1907		
24	Francisco "Paco" Sanz y Perez	1908 - 1916		
25	Pablo Mayor	1917 - 1918		
26	Adriano Rios	1919 - 1921	resigned	
27	Inocencio Gonzales	1921 - 1925		
28	Juan Fetalvero	1926 - 1929		
29	Manuel Alvero	1930 - 1933		
30	Jose Perez	1934 - 1937		
31	Jose Firmalo y Fetalino	1938 - 1940	Paternal uncle of the 45th governor.	
32	Secretary of the Interior	1940 - 30 September 1942	Pursuant to Section 7 of Commonwealth Act 581, the Governor of the former province of Romblon was the Secretary of Interior.	
33	Governor of Capiz	30 September 1942 - 1 October 1946	Pursuant to Executive Order No. 84, the existing special municipalities of Romblon and the province itself were abolished and annexed to Capiz.	
34	Jovencio Mayor y Quimil	1947 - 11 September 1953	Resigned	
35	Democrito Castro	11 September 1953 - 6 January 1954	Designated by President Elpidio Quirino	
36	Manuel L. Solidum	6 January 1954 - 1955	Designated by President Ramon Magsaysay	Democrito M. Castro
37	Jose DO. Mayor	1955		
38	Manuel L. Solidum	1956 - 1959		
39	Antonio Mayuga	1960 - 1965		
40	Patriotismo Fondevilla y Fainsan	1965 - 1967	Son-in-law of the first and long-time lone representative of Romblon Leonardo Festin y Fabon and uncle-in-law of 41st and 43rd governor.	
41	Jovencio Mayor y Quimil	1968 - 1971		
42	Manuel L. Solidum	1972 - 1986	The only governor in the entire period of Martial law.	
43	Jose M. Madrid	1986 - 30 June 1989		
43	Jose M. Madrid	30 June 1989 - 30 June 1992		
43	Jose M. Madrid	30 June 1992 - 30 June 1995		
43	Jose M. Madrid	30 June 1995 - 30 June 1998		
44	Perpetuo Ylagan y Barredo	30 June 1998 - 30 June 2001	Nephew-in-law of the 37th governor	
45	Eleandro Jesus Madrona y Fabic	30 June 2001 - 30 June 2004	Son of Esteban Madrona; brother of representative Emmanuel Madrona	Jose Fonte
46	Perpetuo Ylagan y Barredo	30 June 2004 - 30 June 2007	Nephew-in-law of the 40th governor	Samuel R. Romero
47	Natalio Beltran y Fernandez	30 June 2007 - 30 June 2010		Alice Fetalvero y Capa
48	Eduardo Firmalo y Chang	30 June 2010 – 30 June 2013	Medical practitioner; nephew of the 31st governor; father of Trina Fabic, current Governor	Manuel Madrid
48	Eduardo Firmalo y Chang	30 June 2013 - 30 June 2016	Medical practitioner; nephew of the 31st governor; father of Trina Fabic, current Governor	Jose Ruado Riano
48	Eduardo Firmalo y Chang	30 June 2016 - 30 June 2019	Medical practitioner; nephew of the 31st governor; father of Trina Fabic, current Governor	Jose Ruado Riano
49	Jose Ruado Riano	30 June 2019 - 30 June 2022	First Romblomanon Governor First Vice Governor to be elected as Governor	Felix Ylagan y Fondevilla
49	Jose Ruado Riano	30 June 2022 - 30 June 2025	First Romblomanon Governor First Vice Governor to be elected as Governor	Arming Gutierrez
50	Trina Firmalo-Fabic	30 June 2025 - incumbent	First woman governor; Former mayor of Odiongan	Arming Gutierrez

== Genealogy ==
Some governors, representatives and board members of Romblon, just like everybody in the province, are related. Jose Firmalo y Fetalino, for example, was the uncle of Eduardo Firmalo y Chang and Perpetuo Ylagan's wife Divina Fondevilla y Grimares was the niece of Patriotismo Fondevilla y Fainsan. Vice-governor Felix Ylagan is the son of Perpetuo Ylagan by Divina Fondevilla and therefore, grandnephew of the late governor Patriotismo Fondevilla.
