= 2001 Philippine gubernatorial elections =

- May 14, 2001

All 79 provincial governorships
	First party	Second party
Party	Lakas	NPC
Last election	42	3
Seats before	31	11
Seats after	28	17
Seat change	▼3	▲6
	Third party	Fourth party
Party	LDP	PMP
Last election	0	0
Seats before	10	4
Seats after	10	6
Seat change	0	▲2
President of the League of Provinces of the Philippines before election
Hilario De Pedro III (South Cotabato; acting)
Lakas
Elected President of the League of Provinces of the Philippines
Rodolfo del Rosario (Davao del Norte)
Lakas

Gubernatorial elections were held in the Philippines on May 14, 2001. All provinces will elect their provincial governors for three-year terms, who will be inaugurated on June 30, 2001, after their proclamation. Governors that are currently serving their third consecutive terms are prohibited from running as governors (they may run for any other posts however).

Metro Manila and highly urbanized and independent component cities such as Angeles City, Cebu City and Davao City are outside the jurisdiction of any province and thus do not run elections for governors of their mother provinces (Pampanga, Cebu and Davao del Sur respectively). These shall elect mayors instead.

== Luzon ==
- Note: All incumbents are marked in Italics.

=== Ilocos Region ===
==== Ilocos Norte ====
Ilocos Norte gubernatorial election
Candidate	Party	Votes	%
Ferdinand Marcos Jr.	Kilusang Bagong Lipunan	201,247	100.00
Total		201,247	100.00
Kilusang Bagong Lipunan hold			

==== Ilocos Sur ====
Ilocos Sur gubernatorial election
Candidate	Party	Votes	%
Deogracias Victor Savellano	Lakas–NUCD–UMDP	116,891	68.62
Benjamin Baterina	PDP–Laban	33,889	19.89
Efren Rafanan	Independent	18,056	10.60
Roque Sison	Independent	1,511	0.89
Total		170,347	100.00
Lakas–NUCD–UMDP hold			

==== La Union ====
La Union gubernatorial election
Candidate	Party	Votes	%
Victor Francisco Ortega	Lakas–NUCD–UMDP	133,244	47.13
Zenaida Dumpit	Laban ng Demokratikong Pilipino	111,424	39.41
Thomas Dumpit Jr.	Laban ng Demokratikong Pilipino	38,056	13.46
Total		282,724	100.00
Lakas–NUCD–UMDP hold			

==== Pangasinan ====
Pangasinan gubernatorial election
Candidate	Party	Votes	%
Victor Aguedo Agbayani	Lakas–NUCD–UMDP	598,897	74.70
Teodoro Cruz	Laban ng Demokratikong Pilipino	202,798	25.30
Total		801,695	100.00
Lakas–NUCD–UMDP hold			

=== Cagayan Valley ===
==== Batanes ====
Batanes gubernatorial election
Candidate	Party	Votes	%
Vicente Gato	Liberal Party	3,628	51.29
Telesforo Castillejos	Lakas–NUCD–UMDP	3,445	48.71
Total		7,073	100.00
Liberal Party hold			

==== Cagayan ====
Cagayan gubernatorial election
Candidate	Party	Votes	%
Edgar Lara	Nationalist People's Coalition	123,463	60.98
Delfin Ting	Lakas–NUCD–UMDP	55,207	27.27
Florencio Vargas	Pwersa ng Masang Pilipino	23,716	11.71
Joven Delos Santos	Independent	75	0.04
Total		202,461	100.00
Nationalist People's Coalition gain from Pwersa ng Masang Pilipino			

==== Isabela ====
Isabela gubernatorial election
Candidate	Party	Votes	%
Faustino Dy Jr.	Nationalist People's Coalition	307,599	100.00
Total		307,599	100.00
Nationalist People's Coalition hold			

==== Nueva Vizcaya ====
Nueva Vizcaya gubernatorial election
Candidate	Party	Votes	%
Rodolfo Agbayani	Nationalist People's Coalition	115,792	97.39
Lauro Palafox	Liberal Party	3,104	2.61
Total		118,896	100.00
Nationalist People's Coalition hold			

==== Quirino ====
Quirino gubernatorial election
Candidate	Party	Votes	%
Pedro Bacani	Laban ng Demokratikong Pilipino	38,761	78.55
Dente Valencia	Lakas–NUCD–UMDP	10,585	21.45
Total		49,346	100.00
Laban ng Demokratikong Pilipino gain from Lakas–NUCD–UMDP			

=== Cordillera Administrative Region ===
==== Abra ====
Abra gubernatorial election
Candidate	Party	Votes	%
Vicente Ysidro Valera	Partido Demokratiko Sosyalista ng Pilipinas	56,654	64.91
Ernesto Pacuño	Lakas–NUCD–UMDP	29,920	34.28
Roy Alzate	Partido Isang Bansa, Isang Diwa	704	0.81
Total		87,278	100.00
Partido Demokratiko Sosyalista ng Pilipinas hold			

==== Apayao ====
Apayao gubernatorial election
Candidate	Party	Votes	%
Elias Bulut Sr.	Nationalist People's Coalition	25,690	78.73
Ambaro Sagle	Lakas–NUCD–UMDP	6,621	20.29
Robert Angco	Independent	318	0.97
Total		32,629	100.00
Nationalist People's Coalition gain from Lakas–NUCD–UMDP			

==== Benguet ====
Benguet gubernatorial election
Candidate	Party	Votes	%
Raul Molintas	Nationalist People's Coalition	56,676	52.66
Robert Tinda-an	Lakas–NUCD–UMDP	50,614	47.03
Bedis Guznian	Partido para sa Demokratikong Reporma–Lapiang Manggagawa	330	0.31
Total		107,620	100.00
Nationalist People's Coalition hold			

==== Ifugao ====
Ifugao gubernatorial election
Candidate	Party	Votes	%
Teodoro Baguilat Jr.	Independent	21,035	34.71
Gualberto Lumauig	Lakas–NUCD–UMDP	11,748	19.39
Francisco Niwane	Independent	10,071	16.62
Robert Mangyao	Independent	9,002	14.86
Lynda Chaguile	Independent	8,739	14.42
Total		60,595	100.00
Independent gain from Laban ng Demokratikong Pilipino			

==== Kalinga ====
Kalinga gubernatorial election
Candidate	Party	Votes	%
Macario Duguiang	Nationalist People's Coalition	19,388	29.76
Dominador Belac	Lakas–NUCD–UMDP	15,394	23.63
Jocel Baac	Nationalist People's Coalition	13,014	19.97
Rommel Diasen	Laban ng Demokratikong Pilipino	12,806	19.66
Samuel Bayangan	Independent	4,550	6.98
Total		65,152	100.00
Nationalist People's Coalition gain from Lakas–NUCD–UMDP			

==== Mountain Province ====
Mountain Province gubernatorial election
Candidate	Party	Votes	%
Sario Malinias	Nationalist People's Coalition	16,581	30.68
Leonard Mayaen	Lakas–NUCD–UMDP	15,113	27.97
Mateo Chiyawan	Liberal Party	15,017	27.79
Harry Dominguez	Independent	7,329	13.56
Total		54,040	100.00
Nationalist People's Coalition gain from Lakas–NUCD–UMDP			

=== Central Luzon ===
==== Bataan ====
Bataan gubernatorial election
Candidate	Party	Votes	%
Leonardo Roman	Nationalist People's Coalition	175,935	100.00
Total		175,935	100.00
Nationalist People's Coalition hold			

==== Bulacan ====
Bulacan gubernatorial election
Candidate	Party	Votes	%
Josefina Dela Cruz	Lakas–NUCD–UMDP	648,836	94.21
Luz Viado	Pwersa ng Masang Pilipino	34,977	5.08
Francisco Cruz	Independent	2,732	0.40
Jayson Ocampo	Independent	1,253	0.18
Miguel Esguerra	Partido Isang Bansa, Isang Diwa	940	0.14
Total		688,738	100.00
Lakas–NUCD–UMDP hold			

==== Nueva Ecija ====
Nueva Ecija gubernatorial election
Candidate	Party	Votes	%
Tomas Joson III	Nationalist People's Coalition	424,105	66.43
Pacifico Fajardo	Lakas–NUCD–UMDP	214,314	33.57
Total		638,419	100.00
Nationalist People's Coalition hold			

==== Pampanga ====
Pampanga gubernatorial election
Candidate	Party	Votes	%
Manuel Lapid	Lakas–NUCD–UMDP	501,238	92.22
Ananias Canlas Jr.	Buklod Capampangan	36,332	6.68
Jose Montemayor Jr.	Independent	5,579	1.03
Marcelino Manalansan	Pwersa ng Masang Pilipino	368	0.07
Total		543,517	100.00
Lakas–NUCD–UMDP hold			

==== Tarlac ====
Tarlac gubernatorial election
Candidate	Party	Votes	%
Jose Yap Sr.	Nationalist People's Coalition	142,048	38.67
Gelacio Manalang	Laban ng Demokratikong Pilipino	127,733	34.78
Herminio Aquino	Lakas–NUCD–UMDP	97,512	26.55
Total		367,293	100.00
Nationalist People's Coalition hold			

==== Zambales ====
Zambales gubernatorial election
Candidate	Party	Votes	%
Vicente Magsaysay	Lakas–NUCD–UMDP	64,816	39.24
Antonio Diaz	Nationalist People's Coalition	59,589	36.08
Cheryl Deloso	Partido para sa Demokratikong Reporma–Lapiang Manggagawa	40,772	24.68
Total		165,177	100.00
Lakas–NUCD–UMDP hold			

=== Southern Tagalog ===
==== Aurora ====
Aurora gubernatorial election
Candidate	Party	Votes	%
Ramoncita Ong	Lakas–NUCD–UMDP	28,085	46.27
Isaias Noveras Jr.	Laban ng Demokratikong Pilipino	26,900	44.31
Luis Querijero	Independent	5,614	9.25
Leandro Ralutin	Independent	97	0.16
Thaddeus Jovellanos	Independent	7	0.01
Total		60,703	100.00
Lakas–NUCD–UMDP hold			

==== Batangas ====
Batangas gubernatorial election
Candidate	Party	Votes	%
Hermilando Mandanas	Partido para sa Demokratikong Reporma	616,576	86.91
Vicente Platon Jr.	Lakas–NUCD–UMDP	92,855	13.09
Total		709,431	100.00
Partido para sa Demokratikong Reporma hold			

==== Cavite ====
Cavite gubernatorial election
Candidate	Party	Votes	%
Erineo Maliksi	Partido Magdalo	380,138	57.13
Ramon Bong Revilla Jr.	Lakas–NUCD–UMDP	283,770	42.65
Cresenciano Pakingan	Partido Isang Bansa, Isang Diwa	1,446	0.22
Total		665,354	100.00
Partido Magdalo gain from Lakas–NUCD–UMDP			

==== Laguna ====
Laguna gubernatorial election
Candidate	Party	Votes	%
Teresita Lazaro	Pwersa ng Masang Pilipino	401,424	60.47
Alberto Lina	Kabalikat ng Malayang Pilipino	262,403	39.53
Total		663,827	100.00
Pwersa ng Masang Pilipino hold			

==== Marinduque ====
Marinduque gubernatorial election
Candidate	Party	Votes	%
Carmencita Reyes	Independent	45,652	58.01
Jose Antonio Carrion	Independent	29,943	38.05
Manuel Rejano	Independent	3,095	3.93
Total		78,690	100.00
Independent hold			

==== Occidental Mindoro ====
Occidental Mindoro gubernatorial election
Candidate	Party	Votes	%
Jose Villarosa	Lakas–NUCD–UMDP	57,136	50.48
Ricardo Quintos	Nationalist People's Coalition	56,043	49.52
Total		113,179	100.00
Lakas–NUCD–UMDP hold			

==== Oriental Mindoro ====
Oriental Mindoro gubernatorial election
Candidate	Party	Votes	%
Bartolome Marasigan Sr.	Lakas–NUCD–UMDP	113,406	61.18
Chalie Valencia	Liberal Party	71,953	38.82
Total		185,359	100.00
Lakas–NUCD–UMDP gain from Liberal Party			

==== Palawan ====
Palawan gubernatorial election
Candidate	Party	Votes	%
Mario Joel Reyes	Lakas–NUCD–UMDP	111,372	58.47
Edward Hagedorn	Nationalist People's Coalition	53,201	27.93
Alfredo Amor Abueg Jr.	Lakas–NUCD–UMDP	25,493	13.38
Richard Lopez	Independent	368	0.19
Alexander Garcia	Independent	31	0.02
Total		190,465	100.00
Lakas–NUCD–UMDP hold			

==== Quezon ====
Quezon gubernatorial election
Candidate	Party	Votes	%
Wilfrido Enverga	Partido para sa Demokratikong Reporma	278,368	59.26
Eduardo Rodriguez	Lakas–NUCD–UMDP	179,523	38.22
Hjalmar Quintana	Nationalist People's Coalition	11,864	2.53
Total		469,755	100.00
Partido para sa Demokratikong Reporma hold			

==== Rizal ====
Rizal gubernatorial election
Candidate	Party	Votes	%
Rebecca Ynares	Nationalist People's Coalition	299,969	63.36
Benjamin Felix	Lakas–NUCD–UMDP	167,213	35.32
Roberto Guido	Independent	3,194	0.67
Benjamin Espiritu	Independent	3,092	0.65
Total		473,468	100.00
Nationalist People's Coalition hold			

==== Romblon ====
Romblon gubernatorial election
Candidate	Party	Votes	%
Eleandro Jesus Madrona	Liberal Party	58,967	70.25
Lorna Madrid	Partido para sa Demokratikong Reporma–Lapiang Manggagawa	24,971	29.75
Total		83,938	100.00
Liberal Party hold			

=== Bicol Region ===
==== Albay ====
Albay gubernatorial election
Candidate	Party	Votes	%
Al Francis Bichara	Lakas–NUCD–UMDP	235,429	63.44
Romeo Salalima	Kabalikat ng Malayang Pilipino	135,703	36.56
Total		371,132	100.00
Lakas–NUCD–UMDP hold			

==== Camarines Norte ====
Camarines Norte gubernatorial election
Candidate	Party	Votes	%
Jesus Typoco Jr.	Lakas–NUCD–UMDP	63,618	45.60
Jesus Emmanuel Pimentel	Laban ng Demokratikong Pilipino	48,710	34.91
Casimiro Padilla	Nationalist People's Coalition	27,198	19.49
Total		139,526	100.00
Lakas–NUCD–UMDP gain from Laban ng Demokratikong Pilipino			

==== Camarines Sur ====
Camarines Sur gubernatorial election
Candidate	Party	Votes	%
Luis Villafuerte Sr.	Laban ng Demokratikong Pilipino	296,435	73.05
Nora Villamayor	Lakas–NUCD–UMDP	108,316	26.69
Jose Beltrano	Partido Isang Bansa, Isang Diwa	719	0.18
Sultan Sadam Delfin	Independent	344	0.08
Total		405,814	100.00
Laban ng Demokratikong Pilipino hold			

==== Catanduanes ====
Catanduanes gubernatorial election
Candidate	Party	Votes	%
Leandro Verceles Jr.	Lakas–NUCD–UMDP	44,173	57.42
Hector Sanchez	Aksyon Demokratiko	32,414	42.13
Romeo Torres Jr.	Independent	342	0.44
Total		76,929	100.00
Lakas–NUCD–UMDP gain from Aksyon Demokratiko			

==== Masbate ====
Masbate gubernatorial election
Candidate	Party	Votes	%
Antonio Kho	Partido para sa Demokratikong Reporma	113,578	53.99
Orlando Danao	Lakas–NUCD–UMDP	96,539	45.89
Ricardo Riveral	Progressive Movement for the Devolution of Initiatives	249	0.12
Total		210,366	100.00
Partido para sa Demokratikong Reporma hold			

==== Sorsogon ====
Sorsogon gubernatorial election
Candidate	Party	Votes	%
Raul Lee	Laban ng Demokratikong Pilipino	141,811	69.91
Romeo Guab	Lakas–NUCD–UMDP	51,958	25.61
Romeo De Los Reyes	Partido para sa Demokratikong Reporma–Lapiang Manggagawa	6,450	3.18
Rafael Holazo	Independent	2,625	1.29
Total		202,844	100.00
Laban ng Demokratikong Pilipino hold			

== Visayas ==
- Note: All incumbents are marked in Italics.

=== Western Visayas ===
==== Aklan ====
Aklan gubernatorial election
Candidate	Party	Votes	%
Florencio Miraflores	Liberal Party	108,442	69.16
Sergio Rigodon	Lakas–NUCD–UMDP	48,363	30.84
Total		156,805	100.00
Liberal Party hold			

==== Antique ====
Antique gubernatorial election
Candidate	Party	Votes	%
Salvacion Perez	Laban ng Demokratikong Pilipino	66,066	46.31
Damian Marfil Jr.	Partido para sa Demokratikong Reporma	55,582	38.96
Arturo Pacificador	Kilusang Bagong Lipunan	21,014	14.73
Total		142,662	100.00
Laban ng Demokratikong Pilipino gain from Lakas–NUCD–UMDP			

==== Capiz ====
Capiz gubernatorial election
Candidate	Party	Votes	%
Vicente Bermejo	Liberal Party	148,380	63.72
Vicente Andaya Jr.	Nationalist People's Coalition	84,492	36.28
Total		232,872	100.00
Liberal Party hold			

==== Guimaras ====
Guimaras gubernatorial election
Candidate	Party	Votes	%
Joaquin Carlos Rahman Nava	Laban ng Demokratikong Pilipino	31,796	62.82
Gerry Yucon	Lakas–NUCD–UMDP	18,820	37.18
Total		50,616	100.00
Laban ng Demokratikong Pilipino hold			

==== Iloilo ====
Iloilo gubernatorial election
Candidate	Party	Votes	%
Niel Tupas Sr.	Laban ng Demokratikong Pilipino	304,231	70.49
Demetrio Sonza	Lakas–NUCD–UMDP	124,736	28.90
Serapio Camposano	Independent	1,921	0.45
Nolbert Gil	Independent	730	0.17
Total		431,618	100.00
Laban ng Demokratikong Pilipino gain from Lakas–NUCD–UMDP			

==== Negros Occidental ====
Negros Occidental gubernatorial election
Candidate	Party	Votes	%
Joseph Marañon	Independent	387,850	59.47
Romeo Gamboa Jr.	Independent	261,960	40.17
Arturo Villaflor	Independent	2,362	0.36
Total		652,172	100.00
Independent gain from Independent			

=== Central Visayas ===
==== Bohol ====
Bohol gubernatorial election
Candidate	Party	Votes	%
Erico Aumentado	Lakas–NUCD–UMDP	228,370	54.73
Rene Relampagos	PDP–Laban	188,820	45.25
Nanjnaaon Nalolasnkeyngedn	Independent	104	0.02
Total		417,294	100.00
Lakas–NUCD–UMDP gain from PDP–Laban			

==== Cebu ====
Cebu gubernatorial election
Candidate	Party	Votes	%
Pablo Garcia	Progressive Movement for the Devolution of Initiatives	494,975	52.42
Fernando Celeste	Nationalist People's Coalition	449,068	47.56
Valeriano Pogoy Sr.	Independent	67	0.01
Inocentes Ouano	Partido Isang Bansa, Isang Diwa	55	0.01
Total		944,165	100.00
Progressive Movement for the Devolution of Initiatives hold			

==== Negros Oriental ====
Negros Oriental gubernatorial election
Candidate	Party	Votes	%
George Arnaiz	Nationalist People's Coalition	190,854	57.28
Edgar Teves	Lakas–NUCD–UMDP	142,316	42.72
Total		333,170	100.00
Nationalist People's Coalition hold			

==== Siquijor ====
Siquijor gubernatorial election
Candidate	Party	Votes	%
Orlando Fua Sr.	Lakas–NUCD–UMDP	19,822	51.37
Arthur Chan	Pwersa ng Masang Pilipino	18,766	48.63
Total		38,588	100.00
Lakas–NUCD–UMDP hold			

=== Eastern Visayas ===
==== Biliran ====
Biliran gubernatorial election
Candidate	Party	Votes	%
Rogelio Espina	Laban ng Demokratikong Pilipino	25,756	44.99
Danilo Parilla	Partido para sa Demokratikong Reporma–Lapiang Manggagawa	15,803	27.61
Wayne Jaro	Lakas–NUCD–UMDP	13,071	22.83
Jose Gonzales	Nacionalista Party	2,612	4.56
Total		57,242	100.00
Laban ng Demokratikong Pilipino gain from Partido para sa Demokratikong Reporma–Lapiang Manggagawa			

==== Eastern Samar ====
Eastern Samar gubernatorial election
Candidate	Party	Votes	%
Clotilde Hilaria Salazar	Nationalist People's Coalition	46,752	36.89
Jose Ramirez	Lakas–NUCD–UMDP	43,794	34.56
Ruperto Ambil Jr.	Laban ng Demokratikong Pilipino	36,186	28.55
Total		126,732	100.00
Nationalist People's Coalition gain from Laban ng Demokratikong Pilipino			

==== Leyte ====
Leyte gubernatorial election
Candidate	Party	Votes	%
Remedios Petilla	Lakas–NUCD–UMDP	270,238	63.14
Ma. Catalina Go	Laban ng Demokratikong Pilipino	155,397	36.31
Jesus Pido	Kilusang Bagong Lipunan	2,387	0.56
Total		428,022	100.00
Lakas–NUCD–UMDP hold			

==== Northern Samar ====
Northern Samar gubernatorial election
Candidate	Party	Votes	%
Raul Daza	Liberal Party	93,366	55.97
Madeleine Ong	Lakas–NUCD–UMDP	73,444	44.03
Total		166,810	100.00
Liberal Party gain from Lakas–NUCD–UMDP			

==== Samar ====
Samar gubernatorial election
Candidate	Party	Votes	%
Milagrosa Tan	Pwersa ng Masang Pilipino	106,429	49.42
Jose Roño	Lakas–NUCD–UMDP	96,960	45.02
Romeo Tarrayo	Laban ng Demokratikong Pilipino	11,968	5.56
Total		215,357	100.00
Pwersa ng Masang Pilipino gain from Lakas–NUCD–UMDP			

==== Southern Leyte ====
Southern Leyte gubernatorial election
Candidate	Party	Votes	%
Rosette Lerias	Nationalist People's Coalition	68,377	51.07
Roger Mercado	Lakas–NUCD–UMDP	65,522	48.93
Total		133,899	100.00
Nationalist People's Coalition hold			

== Mindanao ==
- Note: All incumbents are marked in Italics.

=== Zamboanga Peninsula ===
==== Basilan ====
Basilan gubernatorial election
Candidate	Party	Votes	%
Wahab Akbar	Pwersa ng Masang Pilipino	60,790	49.05
Ahmad Al-Rashed Sakkalahul	Laban ng Demokratikong Pilipino	39,510	31.88
Candu Muarip	Lakas–NUCD–UMDP	22,606	18.24
Aldanie Lapiña	Kabalikat ng Malayang Pilipino	847	0.68
Tanjinul Mujamon	People's Reform Party	191	0.15
Total		123,944	100.00
Pwersa ng Masang Pilipino hold			

==== Zamboanga del Norte ====
Zamboanga del Norte gubernatorial election
Candidate	Party	Votes	%
Isagani Amatong	Lakas–NUCD–UMDP	178,114	63.68
Concordio Adriatico	Nationalist People's Coalition	101,604	36.32
Total		279,718	100.00
Lakas–NUCD–UMDP hold			

==== Zamboanga del Sur ====
Zamboanga del Sur gubernatorial election
Candidate	Party	Votes	%
Aurora Cerilles	Nationalist People's Coalition	153,847	53.98
Romeo Vera Cruz	Lakas–NUCD–UMDP	131,162	46.02
Total		285,009	100.00
Nationalist People's Coalition gain from Lakas–NUCD–UMDP			

==== Zamboanga Sibugay ====
Zamboanga Sibugay gubernatorial election
Candidate	Party	Votes	%
George Hofer	Kabalikat ng Malayang Pilipino	71,469	53.01
Alfredo Chu	Lakas–NUCD–UMDP	63,345	46.99
Total		134,814	100.00
Kabalikat ng Malayang Pilipino hold			

=== Northern Mindanao ===
==== Bukidnon ====
Bukidnon gubernatorial election
Candidate	Party	Votes	%
Jose Ma. Zubiri Jr.	Lakas–NUCD–UMDP	225,897	71.06
Nemesio Beltran	Pwersa ng Masang Pilipino	91,277	28.71
Emilio Saturion	Independent	718	0.23
Total		317,892	100.00
Lakas–NUCD–UMDP gain from Pwersa ng Masang Pilipino			

==== Camiguin ====
Camiguin gubernatorial election
Candidate	Party	Votes	%
Pedro Romualdo	Lakas–NUCD–UMDP	25,492	67.20
Juan Margarito Neri	People Power Coalition	12,442	32.80
Total		37,934	100.00
Lakas–NUCD–UMDP hold			

==== Misamis Occidental ====
Misamis Occidental gubernatorial election
Candidate	Party	Votes	%
Loreto Leo Ocampos	Lakas–NUCD–UMDP	105,715	59.74
Benjamin Fuentes	Nationalist People's Coalition	71,246	40.26
Total		176,961	100.00
Lakas–NUCD–UMDP gain from People Power Coalition			

==== Misamis Oriental ====
Misamis Oriental gubernatorial election
Candidate	Party	Votes	%
Antonio Calingin	Laban ng Demokratikong Pilipino	142,389	55.08
Danilo Lagbas	Lakas–NUCD–UMDP	114,748	44.39
Cecilia Roa	Partido Isang Bansa, Isang Diwa	948	0.37
Eliaquim Magtrayo	Independent	417	0.16
Total		258,502	100.00
Laban ng Demokratikong Pilipino hold			

=== Davao Region ===
==== Compostela Valley ====
Compostela Valley gubernatorial election
Candidate	Party	Votes	%
Jose Caballero	Partido para sa Demokratikong Reporma–Lapiang Manggagawa	102,158	56.07
Rogelio Sarmiento	Lakas–NUCD–UMDP	80,031	43.93
Total		182,189	100.00
Partido para sa Demokratikong Reporma–Lapiang Manggagawa hold			

==== Davao del Norte ====
Davao del Norte gubernatorial election
Candidate	Party	Votes	%
Rodolfo del Rosario	Lakas–NUCD–UMDP	160,534	67.85
Roberto Sebastian	Partido para sa Demokratikong Reporma–Lapiang Manggagawa	76,067	32.15
Total		236,601	100.00
Lakas–NUCD–UMDP hold			

==== Davao del Sur ====
Davao del Sur gubernatorial election
Candidate	Party	Votes	%
Reynerio Llanos	Nationalist People's Coalition	134,028	59.43
Antonio Sunga	Lakas–NUCD–UMDP	90,940	40.32
Paul Sapsal	Partido Isang Bansa, Isang Diwa	553	0.25
Total		225,521	100.00
Nationalist People's Coalition hold			

==== Davao Oriental ====
Davao Oriental gubernatorial election
Candidate	Party	Votes	%
Ma. Elena Palma Gil	Lakas–NUCD–UMDP	77,945	53.75
Benito Rabat	Pwersa ng Masang Pilipino	44,874	30.95
Capistrano Roflo	Partido para sa Demokratikong Reporma–Lapiang Manggagawa	22,186	15.30
Total		145,005	100.00
Lakas–NUCD–UMDP gain from Partido para sa Demokratikong Reporma–Lapiang Manggagawa			

==== Sarangani ====
Sarangani gubernatorial election
Candidate	Party	Votes	%
Miguel Escobar	Lakas–NUCD–UMDP	49,412	45.23
Juan Domino	Pwersa ng Masang Pilipino	45,815	41.94
Uttoh Salem Cutan	Partido Demokratiko Sosyalista ng Pilipinas	12,550	11.49
Raymond Manlunas	Partido Isang Bansa, Isang Diwa	835	0.76
Francis Martinez	Independent	625	0.57
Total		109,237	100.00
Lakas–NUCD–UMDP hold			

==== South Cotabato ====
South Cotabato gubernatorial election
Candidate	Party	Votes	%
Daisy Fuentes	Nationalist People's Coalition	164,176	77.37
Dad Tuan	Kabalikat ng Malayang Pilipino	27,893	13.14
Ernesto Catedral	Lakas–NUCD–UMDP	20,131	9.49
Total		212,200	100.00
Nationalist People's Coalition gain from Lakas–NUCD–UMDP			

=== Soccsksargen ===
==== Cotabato ====
Cotabato gubernatorial election
Candidate	Party	Votes	%
Emmanuel Piñol	Partido Isang Bansa, Isang Diwa	191,293	69.45
Anthony Dequiña	Nationalist People's Coalition	84,153	30.55
Total		275,446	100.00
Partido Isang Bansa, Isang Diwa hold			

==== Lanao del Norte ====
Lanao del Norte gubernatorial election
Candidate	Party	Votes	%
Imelda Dimaporo	Lakas–NUCD–UMDP	77,529	47.65
Constancio Pepito	Laban ng Demokratikong Pilipino	53,905	33.13
Makabangkit Lanto	Independent	26,352	16.20
Amer Nagamura Moner	Aksyon Demokratiko	4,919	3.02
Total		162,705	100.00
Lakas–NUCD–UMDP hold			

==== Sultan Kudarat ====
Sultan Kudarat gubernatorial election
Candidate	Party	Votes	%
Datu Pax Pakung Mangudadatu	Kabalikat ng Malayang Pilipino	92,274	54.46
Rosila Jamison	Laban ng Demokratikong Pilipino	46,638	27.52
Nesthur Gumana	Lakas–NUCD–UMDP	30,426	17.96
Ephraim Defiño	Laban ng Makabayang Masang Pilipino	107	0.06
Total		169,445	100.00
Kabalikat ng Malayang Pilipino hold			

=== Caraga ===
==== Agusan del Norte ====
Agusan del Norte gubernatorial election
Candidate	Party	Votes	%
Ma. Angelica Rosedel Amante	Lakas–NUCD–UMDP	65,144	60.70
Shellah Ma. Libarios	People Power Coalition	35,638	33.21
Reynaldo Garcia	Independent	6,499	6.06
Gerardo Quiamjot	Independent	43	0.04
Total		107,324	100.00
Lakas–NUCD–UMDP hold			

==== Agusan del Sur ====
Agusan del Sur gubernatorial election
Candidate	Party	Votes	%
Adolph Edward Plaza	Laban ng Demokratikong Pilipino	99,779	64.61
Reynaldo Quijada	Lakas–NUCD–UMDP	54,652	35.39
Total		154,431	100.00
Laban ng Demokratikong Pilipino hold			

==== Surigao del Norte ====
Surigao del Norte gubernatorial election
Candidate	Party	Votes	%
Robert Lyndon Barbers	Lakas–NUCD–UMDP	106,271	51.94
Ernesto Matugas	Laban ng Demokratikong Pilipino	98,145	47.97
Gaudioso Vergara	Independent	141	0.07
Romeo Petallo	Independent	40	0.02
Total		204,597	100.00
Lakas–NUCD–UMDP gain from Laban ng Demokratikong Pilipino			

==== Surigao del Sur ====
Surigao del Sur gubernatorial election
Candidate	Party	Votes	%
Vicente Pimentel Jr.	Lakas–NUCD–UMDP	67,964	38.41
Ramon Tan	Nationalist People's Coalition	43,823	24.76
Tito Canedo III	Liberal Party	39,732	22.45
Gregorio Murillo	Progressive Movement for the Devolution of Initiatives	25,440	14.38
Total		176,959	100.00
Lakas–NUCD–UMDP gain from Progressive Movement for the Devolution of Initiatives			

=== Autonomous Region in Muslim Mindanao ===
==== Lanao del Sur ====
Lanao del Sur gubernatorial election
Candidate	Party	Votes	%
Mamintal Adiong Sr.	Pwersa ng Masang Pilipino	59,485	26.15
Ameroddin Sarangani	Lakas–NUCD–UMDP	52,207	22.95
Saidamen Pangarungan	PDP–Laban	52,112	22.91
Mofti-Mokhtar Abedin	Ompia Party	37,026	16.28
Abubakhar Baulo	Partido para sa Demokratikong Reporma–Lapiang Manggagawa	14,738	6.48
Muhammad Ali Basir Lucman	Kabalikat ng Malayang Pilipino	8,843	3.89
Basher Edris	Independent	2,150	0.95
Mansawi Mimbalawag	Lakas–NUCD–UMDP	526	0.23
Abdul Dimaporo	Kilusang Bagong Lipunan	237	0.10
Usman Sheik Ri-Aman	Independent	82	0.04
Mandangan Decampong	Muslim Reform Party	39	0.02
Jiamil Dianalan	Kabalikat ng Malayang Pilipino	23	0.01
Hadji Yahya Jerry Tomawis	Laban ng Demokratikong Pilipino	12	0.01
Total		227,480	100.00
Pwersa ng Masang Pilipino gain from Lakas–NUCD–UMDP			

==== Maguindanao ====
Maguindanao gubernatorial election
Candidate	Party	Votes	%
Andal Ampatuan Sr.	Pwersa ng Masang Pilipino	175,540	60.69
Zacaria Candao	Lakas–NUCD–UMDP	113,688	39.31
Total		289,228	100.00
Pwersa ng Masang Pilipino gain from Lakas–NUCD–UMDP			

==== Sulu ====
Sulu gubernatorial election
Candidate	Party	Votes	%
Yusop Jikiri	Lakas–NUCD–UMDP	70,066	55.76
Abdusakur Mahail Tan	Pwersa ng Masang Pilipino	55,597	44.24
Total		125,663	100.00
Lakas–NUCD–UMDP gain from Pwersa ng Masang Pilipino			

==== Tawi-Tawi ====
Tawi-Tawi gubernatorial election
Candidate	Party	Votes	%
Rashidin Matba	Pwersa ng Masang Pilipino	43,111	51.20
Sadikul Sahali	Lakas–NUCD–UMDP	38,870	46.16
Anni Ahlul	Independent	2,202	2.62
Abdulkarim Ladjamatli Ustadz	Independent	22	0.03
Total		84,205	100.00
Pwersa ng Masang Pilipino gain from Lakas–NUCD–UMDP			
