= Leody Tarriela =

Filipino businessman and politician (born 1968)

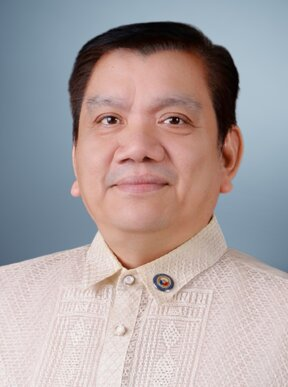
- Official portrait, 2025

Member of the House of Representatives from Occidental Mindoro's at-large district
- Incumbent
- Assumed office June 30, 2022
- Preceded by: Josephine Sato

Personal details
- Born: Leody Flores Tarriela; October 2, 1968 (age 58) Manila, Philippines
- Party: PFP (2023–present)
- Other political affiliations: PDDS (2021–2023)
- Education: Far Eastern University (BS)
- Occupation: Politician, businessman

Leody "Odie" Flores Tarriela (born October 2, 1968) is a Filipino businessman and politician. He is currently serving as representative of the Occidental Mindoro's at-large district of Occidental Mindoro in the House of Representatives of the Philippines since 2022.

== Early life and education ==
Tarriela was born on October 2, 1968, in Manila. He studied Far Eastern University where he finished the degree of Bachelor of Science in Commerce Major in Accounting.

== Political career ==
In 2022, Tarriela was elected as representative for lone district of Occidental Mindoro.

== Electoral history ==
=== 2025 ===
Candidate	Party	Votes	%
Leody Tarriela (incumbent)	Partido Federal ng Pilipinas	155,102	63.36
Josephine Sato	Liberal Party	89,698	36.64
Total		244,800	100.00
Valid votes		244,800	95.61
Invalid/blank votes		11,234	4.39
Total votes		256,034	100.00
Registered voters/turnout		321,699	79.59
Partido Federal ng Pilipinas hold			
Source: Commission on Elections

=== 2022 ===
2022 Philippine House of Representatives elections
Party	Candidate	Votes	%
PDDS	Leody Tarriela	92,770	
Liberal	Philip Ramirez	44,548	
Independent	Noli Leycano	37,517	
PDP–Laban	Peter Alfaro	36,933	
Lakas	Bunny Villarosa-Kalaw	16,114	
Total votes			
PDDS gain from Liberal			
