= Trina Firmalo-Fabic =

Filipino politician

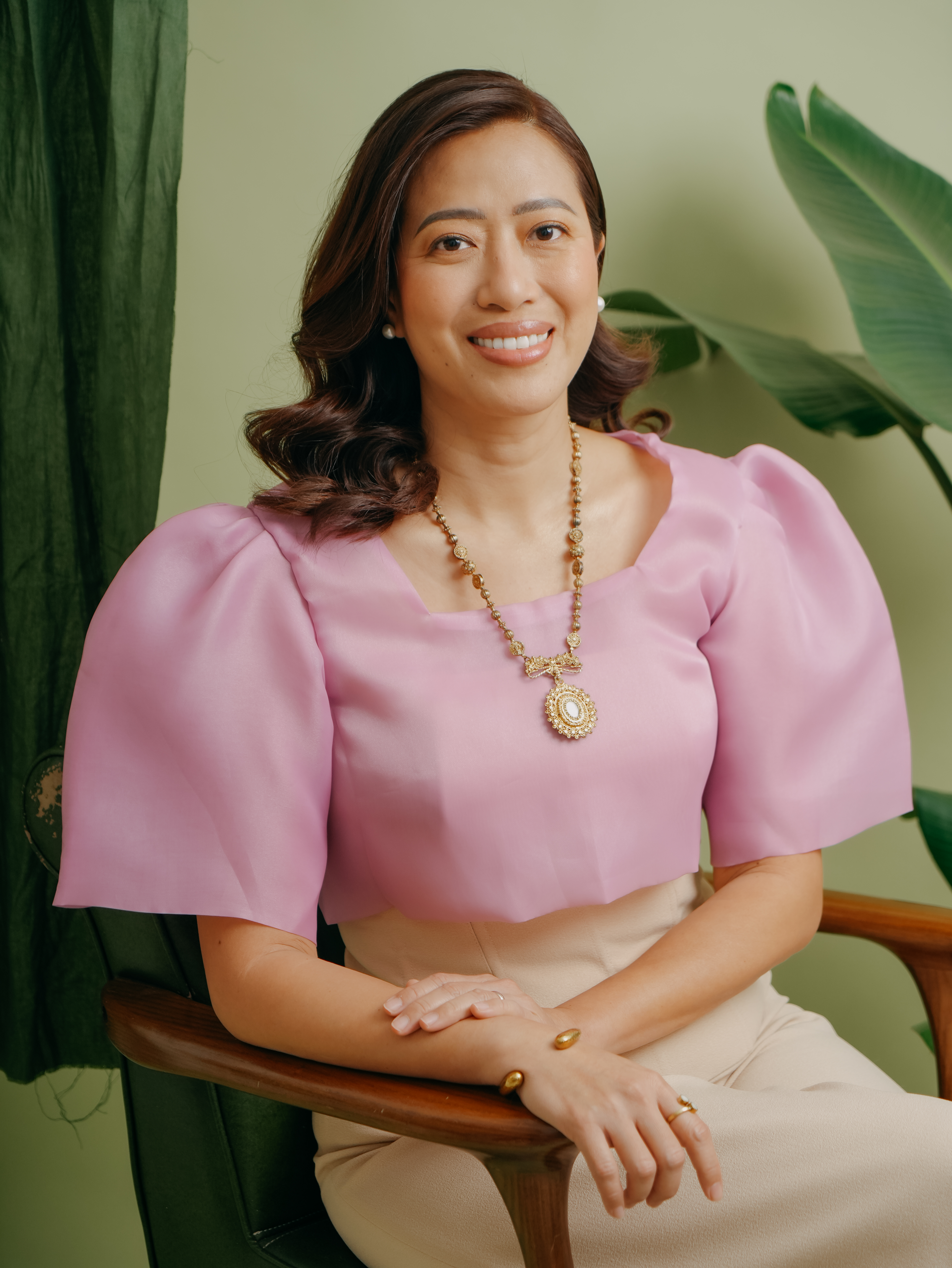
- Firmalo-Fabic in 2024

Governor of Romblon
- Incumbent
- Assumed office 30 June 2025
- Vice Governor: Armando Gutierrez
- Preceded by: Jose R. "Otik" Riano

Mayor of Odiongan
- In office 30 June 2016 – 30 June 2025

Personal details
- Born: Trina Alejandra Que Firmalo; February 18, 1982 (age 44)
- Party: Liberal (2015-present)
- Spouse: Jose Luis Aguila Fabic
- Parent(s): Eduardo "Lolong" Firmalo (father); Leonie Firmalo (mother)
- Occupation: Politician

Trina Alejandra Que Firmalo-Fabic is a Filipino politician who serves as the governor of Romblon. She previously served three consecutive terms as mayor of Odiongan, Romblon from 2016 to 2025. In the 2025 Romblon gubernatorial election, she defeated incumbent governor Jose R. "Otik" Riano and became the first woman elected governor of Romblon.

== Early life and education ==
Firmalo-Fabic is the daughter of former Romblon governor Eduardo "Lolong" Firmalo and Dr. Leonie Firmalo.

She graduated from the University of the Philippines with a Bachelor of Arts in Sociology (magna cum laude) and from Princeton University with a Master of Public Affairs, with a concentration in International Development.

She is a PRC licensed environmental planner and has served in staff roles in provincial and national government, including as chief of staff in the Romblon provincial government and as a political affairs officer in the House of Representatives of the Philippines.

== Electoral history ==
Electoral history of Trina Firmalo-Fabic
Year	Office	Party	Votes received				Result
Year	Office	Party	Total	%	P.	Swing	Result
2016	Mayor of Odiongan	Liberal	9,985	48.27%	1st	—N/a	Won
2019	Mayor of Odiongan	Liberal	15,641	71.18%	1st	+22.91	Won
2022	Mayor of Odiongan	Liberal	17,001	63.67%	1st	-7.51	Won
2025	Governor of Romblon	Liberal	93,425	54.97%	1st	—N/a	Won

Political Office
Preceded by Roger Q. Fodra	Mayor of Odiongan; 30 June 2016 - 30 June 2025	Succeeded by Roger Q. Fodra
Preceded by Jose Riano	Governor of Romblon; 30 June 2025	Incumbent

== See also ==
- List of current Philippine governors
