= Palawan's 3rd congressional district =

Legislative district of the Philippines

- Constituency for the House of Representatives of the Philippines
- Location of Palawan within the Philippines
- Province: Palawan
- Region: Mimaropa
- Population: 345,815 (2020)
- Electorate: 194,033 (2022)
- Major settlements: 2 LGUs: Cities; Puerto Princesa; Municipalities; Aborlan
- Area: 3,188.35 km^{2} (1,231.03 sq mi)

Current constituency
- Created: 2012
- Representative: Gil Acosta Jr.
- Political party: NPC; PPPL
- Congressional bloc: Majority

Palawan's 3rd congressional district is one of the three congressional districts of the Philippines in the province of Palawan. It has been represented in the House of Representatives since 2013. The district is composed of the city of Puerto Princesa and adjacent municipality of Aborlan. It was created after the 2012 reapportionment that redrew the boundaries of the 2nd district and allocated a new district for Palawan's capital and only city. The district is represented in the 20th Congress by Gil Acosta Jr. of the Nationalist People's Coalition (NPC) and Partidong Pagbabago ng Palawan (PPPL).

== Representation history ==
#	Image	Member	Term of office		Congress	Party	Electoral history	Constituent LGUs
#	Image	Member	Start	End	Congress	Party	Electoral history	Constituent LGUs
=== Palawan's 3rd district for the House of Representatives of the Philippines ===
District created July 19, 2012 from Palawan's 2nd district.
1		Douglas S. Hagedorn	June 30, 2013	June 30, 2016	16th	NPC	Elected in 2013.	2013–present Aborlan, Puerto Princesa
2		Gil P. Acosta	June 30, 2016	June 30, 2019	17th	NPC	Elected in 2016.	2013–present Aborlan, Puerto Princesa
3		Gil A. Acosta Jr.	June 30, 2019	June 30, 2022	18th	PPPL	Elected in 2019.	2013–present Aborlan, Puerto Princesa
4		Edward S. Hagedorn	June 30, 2022	October 3, 2023	19th	PDP–Laban	Elected in 2022. Died.	2013–present Aborlan, Puerto Princesa
—	vacant		October 3, 2023	June 30, 2025	19th			2013–present Aborlan, Puerto Princesa
(3)		Gil A. Acosta Jr.	June 30, 2025	Incumbent	20th	Lakas (PPPL)	Elected in 2025.	2013–present Aborlan, Puerto Princesa
(3)		Gil A. Acosta Jr.	June 30, 2025	Incumbent	20th	NPC (PPPL)	Elected in 2025.	2013–present Aborlan, Puerto Princesa

== Election results ==
=== 2025 ===
Candidate	Party	Votes	%
Gil Acosta Jr.	Lakas–CMD	79,019	45.86
Abraham Mitra	Nacionalista Party	72,370	42.00
Clink Hagedorn	Independent	20,916	12.14
Total		172,305	100.00
Valid votes		172,305	96.97
Invalid/blank votes		5,390	3.03
Total votes		177,695	100.00
Registered voters/turnout		210,248	84.52
Lakas–CMD gain from Partido Demokratiko Pilipino			
Source: Commission on Elections

=== 2022 ===
Candidate	Party	Votes	%
Edward Hagedorn	PDP–Laban	80,325	52.74
Gil Acosta Jr. (incumbent)	Partidong Pagbabago ng Palawan	71,986	47.26
Total		152,311	100.00
Total votes		159,956	–
Registered voters/turnout		194,033	82.44
PDP–Laban gain from Partidong Pagbabago ng Palawan			
Source: Commission on Elections

== See also ==
- Legislative districts of Palawan
