= Occidental Mindoro's at-large congressional district =

Legislative district of the Philippines

- Constituency for the House of Representatives of the Philippines
- Location of Occidental Mindoro within the Philippines
- Province: Occidental Mindoro
- Region: Mimaropa
- Population: 525,354 (2020)
- Electorate: 321,699 (2025)
- Area: 5,865.71 km^{2} (2,264.76 sq mi)

Current constituency
- Created: 1950
- Representative: Leody "Odie" Tarriela
- Political party: PFP
- Congressional bloc: Majority

Occidental Mindoro's at-large congressional district is the sole congressional district of the Philippines in the province of Occidental Mindoro. Also known as Occidental Mindoro's lone district, it has been represented in the House of Representatives of the Philippines since 1952. It first elected a representative provincewide at-large for the 2nd Congress of the Third Philippine Republic following the dissolution of the old Mindoro province under Republic Act No. 505 on June 13, 1950. It has remained a single-member district even under the Fourth Philippine Republic parliament known as the Regular Batasang Pambansa from 1984 to 1986.

The district is currently represented in the 20th Congress by Leody "Odie" Tarriela of the Partido Federal ng Pilipinas (PFP).

== Representation history ==
#	Image	Member	Term of office		Congress	Party	Electoral history
#	Image	Member	Start	End	Congress	Party	Electoral history
=== Occidental Mindoro's at-large district for the House of Representatives of the Philippines ===
District created June 13, 1950 from Mindoro's at-large district.
1		Jesús V. Abeleda	January 28, 1952	December 30, 1953	2nd	Nacionalista	Elected in 1951 special elections.
2		Felipe S. Abeleda	December 30, 1953	December 30, 1965	3rd	Liberal	Elected in 1953.
2		Felipe S. Abeleda	December 30, 1953	December 30, 1965	4th	Liberal	Re-elected in 1957.
2		Felipe S. Abeleda	December 30, 1953	December 30, 1965	5th	Liberal	Re-elected in 1961.
3		Pedro C. Medalla	December 30, 1965	September 23, 1972	6th	Nacionalista	Elected in 1965.
3		Pedro C. Medalla	December 30, 1965	September 23, 1972	7th	Nacionalista	Re-elected in 1969. Removed from office after imposition of martial law.
District dissolved into the twenty-seat Region IV-A's at-large district for the Interim Batasang Pambansa.
#	Image	Member	Term of office		Batasang Pambansa	Party	Electoral history
#	Image	Member	Start	End	Batasang Pambansa	Party	Electoral history
=== Occidental Mindoro's at-large district for the Regular Batasang Pambansa ===
District re-created February 1, 1984.
4		Pedro T. Mendiola	July 23, 1984	March 25, 1986	2nd	KBL	Elected in 1984.
#	Image	Member	Term of office		Congress	Party	Electoral history
#	Image	Member	Start	End	Congress	Party	Electoral history
=== Occidental Mindoro's at-large district for the House of Representatives of the Philippines ===
District re-created February 2, 1987.
5		Mario Gene J. Mendiola	June 30, 1987	June 30, 1992	8th	Nacionalista	Elected in 1987.
6		Jose T. Villarosa	June 30, 1992	June 30, 1998	9th	Lakas	Elected in 1992.
6		Jose T. Villarosa	June 30, 1992	June 30, 1998	10th	Lakas	Re-elected in 1995.
7		Ma. Amelita A. Calimbas-Villarosa	June 30, 1998	August 29, 2000	11th	Lakas	Elected in 1998. Election annulled after an electoral protest.
8		Ricardo V. Quintos	August 29, 2000	June 30, 2001	11th	LDP	Declared winner of 1998 elections.
9		Josephine Sato	June 30, 2001	June 30, 2004	12th	Lakas	Elected in 2001.
(7)		Ma. Amelita A. Calimbas-Villarosa	June 30, 2004	June 30, 2013	13th	Lakas	Elected in 2004.
(7)		Ma. Amelita A. Calimbas-Villarosa	June 30, 2004	June 30, 2013	14th	Lakas	Re-elected in 2007.
(7)		Ma. Amelita A. Calimbas-Villarosa	June 30, 2004	June 30, 2013	15th	Lakas	Re-elected in 2010.
(9)		Josephine Sato	June 30, 2013	June 30, 2022	16th	Liberal	Elected in 2013.
(9)		Josephine Sato	June 30, 2013	June 30, 2022	17th	Liberal	Re-elected in 2016.
(9)		Josephine Sato	June 30, 2013	June 30, 2022	18th	Liberal	Re-elected in 2019.
10		Leody F. Tarriela	June 30, 2022	Incumbent	19th	PDDS	Elected in 2022.
10		Leody F. Tarriela	June 30, 2022	Incumbent	20th	PFP	Re-elected in 2025.

== Election results ==
=== 2025 ===
Candidate	Party	Votes	%
Odie Tarriela (incumbent)	Partido Federal ng Pilipinas	155,102	63.36
Josephine Sato	Liberal Party	89,698	36.64
Total		244,800	100.00
Valid votes		244,800	95.61
Invalid/blank votes		11,234	4.39
Total votes		256,034	100.00
Registered voters/turnout		321,699	79.59
Partido Federal ng Pilipinas hold			
Source: Commission on Elections

=== 2022 ===
2022 Philippine House of Representatives elections
Party	Candidate	Votes	%
PDDS	Leody "Odie" Tarriela	92,770	
Liberal	Philip Ramirez	44,548	
Independent	Noli Leycano	37,517	
PDP–Laban	Peter Alfaro	36,933	
Lakas	Bunny Villarosa-Kalaw	16,114	
Total votes			
PDDS gain from Liberal			

=== 2016 ===
2016 Philippine House of Representatives elections
Party	Candidate	Votes	%
Liberal	Josephine Ramirez-Sato	142,551	
UNA	Damsy Malabanan	20,748	
Independent	Thomas Ledesma	6,556	
Invalid or blank votes		29,930	
Total votes		199,785	
Liberal hold			

=== 2013 ===
2013 Philippine House of Representatives elections
Party	Candidate	Votes	%
Liberal	Josephine Sato	84,897	65.18
Lakas	Edgardo Urieta	35,321	27.12
Margin of victory		49,576	38.06%
Invalid or blank votes		10,036	7.70
Total votes		130,254	100.00
Liberal gain from Lakas			

=== 2010 ===
2010 Philippine House of Representatives elections
Party	Candidate	Votes	%
Lakas–Kampi	Ma. Amelita Villarosa	84,626	53.45
NPC	Benjamin Tria	67,540	42.66
Aksyon	Clarita Samala	4,000	2.53
PGRP	Josefino Garillo	1,280	0.81
Independent	Samloen Pimentel, Jr.	876	0.55
Valid ballots		158,322	91.88
Invalid or blank votes		13,991	8.12
Total votes		172,313	100.00
Lakas–Kampi hold			

== See also ==
- Legislative districts of Occidental Mindoro
