= Eleandro Jesus Madrona =

Filipino politician (born 1949)

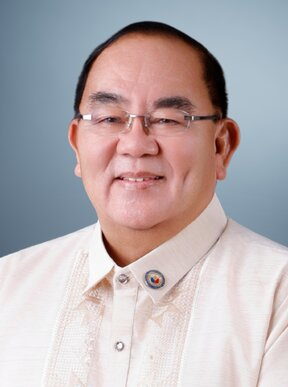
- Official portrait, 2025

Member of the House of Representatives from Romblon's at-large district
- Incumbent
- Assumed office June 30, 2019
- Preceded by: Emmanuel Madrona
- In office June 30, 2007 – June 30, 2016
- Preceded by: Eduardo Firmalo
- Succeeded by: Emmanuel Madrona
- In office June 30, 1992 – June 30, 2001
- Preceded by: Natalio Beltran Jr.
- Succeeded by: Perpetuo Ylagan

Governor of Romblon
- In office June 30, 2001 – June 30, 2004
- Vice Governor: Jose Fonte
- Preceded by: Perpetuo Ylagan
- Succeeded by: Perpetuo Ylagan

Personal details
- Born: Eleandro Jesus Fabic Madrona; December 16, 1949 (age 76) Odiongan, Romblon, Philippines
- Party: Nacionalista (2007–present)
- Other political affiliations: Lakas (1992–2001; 2006–2007); Liberal (2001–2006)
- Education: University of Santo Tomas (BA); University of the Philippines (LLB)
- Occupation: Lawyer, politician

Eleandro Jesus "Budoy" Fabic Madrona (born December 16, 1949) is a Filipino lawyer and politician. He is currently serving as representative of Romblon's at-large in the House of Representatives of the Philippines since 2019, a position he previously held from 2007 to 2016 and from 1992 to 2001. He previously served as Governor of Romblon from 2001 to 2004.

== Early life and education ==
Madrona was born on December 16, 1949, in Odiongan, to Esteban Madrona, a former governor and representative from Romblon and Evangelina Fabic. He studied University of Santo Tomas with the degree of Philosophy. He took up law at the University of the Philippines. In 1979, Madrona passed the bar examination.

== Political career ==
In 1992, Madrona became a representative for lone district of Romblon for three consecutive terms.

In 2001, Madrona was elected as governor of Romblon until 2004.

In 2007, Madrona returned as representative of Romblon for three consecutive terms.

In 2019, Madrona returned again as representative of Romblon after he succeeded his brother.

In 2020, Madrona was one of the 70 representatives who voted to permanently deny the renewal of broadcasting franchise of television network ABS-CBN.

== Personal life ==
His brother, Emmanuel Madrona, is also a representative from Romblon from 2016 to 2019.

== Electoral history ==
Electoral history of Eleandro Jesus Madrona
Year	Office	Party	Votes received				Result
Year	Office	Party	Total	%	P.	Swing	Result
1992	Representative (Romblon at–large)	Lakas	34,620	50.91%	1st	—N/a	Won
1995	Representative (Romblon at–large)	Lakas	42,251	56.21%	1st	—N/a	Won
1998	Representative (Romblon at–large)	Lakas	51,125	58.83%	1st	—N/a	Won
2007	Representative (Romblon at–large)	Lakas	58,730	—N/a	1st	—N/a	Won
2010	Representative (Romblon at–large)	Nacionalista	71,610	57.25%	1st	—N/a	Won
2013	Representative (Romblon at–large)	Nacionalista	66,247	67.28%	1st	—N/a	Won
2019	Representative (Romblon at–large)	Nacionalista	85,961	—N/a	1st	—N/a	Won
2022	Representative (Romblon at–large)	Nacionalista	128,996	81.18%	1st	—N/a	Won
2025	Representative (Romblon at–large)	Nacionalista	129,273	82.37%	1st	—N/a	Won
2001	Governor of Romblon	Liberal	58,967	70.25%	1st	—N/a	Won

Political offices
Preceded by Emmanuel Madrona	Representative from Romblon's at-large district 2019–present 2007–2016; 1992–2001	Incumbent
Preceded by Eduardo Firmalo	Representative from Romblon's at-large district 2019–present 2007–2016; 1992–2001	Succeeded by Emmanuel Madrona
Preceded by Natalio Beltran Jr.	Representative from Romblon's at-large district 2019–present 2007–2016; 1992–2001	Succeeded by Perpetuo Ylagan
Preceded by Perpetuo B. Ylagan	Governor of Romblon; 2001–2004	Succeeded by Perpetuo B. Ylagan
