= Romblon's at-large congressional district =

Legislative district of the Philippines

- Constituency for the House of Representatives of the Philippines
- Location of Romblon within the Philippines
- Province: Romblon
- Region: Mimaropa
- Population: 308,985 (2020)
- Electorate: 206,119 (2022)
- Area: 1,533.45 km^{2} (592.07 sq mi)

Current constituency
- Created: 1919 (single-member district)
- Representative: Eleandro Jesus F. Madrona
- Political party: Nacionalista
- Congressional bloc: Majority

Romblon's at-large congressional district refers to the lone congressional district of the Philippines in the province of Romblon. It has been represented in the House of Representatives of the Philippines since 1919 and earlier in the Malolos Congress (National Assembly) of the First Philippine Republic from 1898 to 1901. Romblon has been represented by a single representative elected provincewide at-large since its reestablishment as a regular province separate from Capiz in 1917. From 1943 to 1944, the district was again dissolved and reconsolidated with Capiz for the National Assembly of the Second Philippine Republic. Between 1978 and 1984, regional delegations were formed in lieu of provinces for the national parliament of the Fourth Philippine Republic, with Romblon forming part of the twenty-seat Region IV-A's at-large district. It was restored as a single-member district in 1984.

The district is currently represented in the 20th Congress by Eleandro Jesus F. Madrona of the Nacionalista Party (NP).

== Representation history ==
#	Term of office		National Assembly	Seat A				Seat B			
#	Start	End	National Assembly	Image	Member	Party	Electoral history	Image	Member	Party	Electoral history
=== Romblon's at-large district for the Malolos Congress ===
District created June 18, 1898.
1	September 15, 1898	March 23, 1901	1st		Lucas Gonzáles Maninang	Independent	Appointed.		Cirilo Canizares	Independent	Appointed.
#	Term of office		Legislature	Single seat				Seats eliminated			
#	Start	End	Legislature	Image	Member	Party	Electoral history	Seats eliminated			
=== Romblon's at-large district for the House of Representatives of the Philippine Islands ===								Seats eliminated			
District re-created December 7, 1917.								Seats eliminated			
2	June 3, 1919	September 16, 1935	5th		Leonardo Festín	Nacionalista	Redistricted from Capiz's 3rd district and re-elected in 1919.	Seats eliminated			
2	June 3, 1919	September 16, 1935	6th		Leonardo Festín	Nacionalista; Unipersonalista	Re-elected in 1922.	Seats eliminated			
2	June 3, 1919	September 16, 1935	7th		Leonardo Festín	Nacionalista; Consolidado	Re-elected in 1925.	Seats eliminated			
2	June 3, 1919	September 16, 1935	8th		Leonardo Festín	Nacionalista; Consolidado	Re-elected in 1928.	Seats eliminated			
2	June 3, 1919	September 16, 1935	9th		Leonardo Festín	Nacionalista; Consolidado	Re-elected in 1931.	Seats eliminated			
2	June 3, 1919	September 16, 1935	10th		Leonardo Festín	Nacionalista; Democrático	Re-elected in 1934.	Seats eliminated			
#	Term of office		National Assembly	Single seat				Seats eliminated			
#	Start	End	National Assembly	Image	Member	Party	Electoral history	Seats eliminated			
=== Romblon's at-large district for the National Assembly (Commonwealth of the Philippines) ===								Seats eliminated			
3	November 15, 1935	December 30, 1938	1st		Gabriel Fabella	Nacionalista; Democrático	Elected in 1935.	Seats eliminated			
(2)	December 30, 1938	December 30, 1941	2nd		Leonardo Festín	Nacionalista	Elected in 1938.	Seats eliminated			
District dissolved into the two-seat Capiz's at-large district for the National Assembly (Second Philippine Republic).								Seats eliminated			
#	Term of office		Common wealth Congress	Single seat				Seats eliminated			
#	Start	End	Common wealth Congress	Image	Member	Party	Electoral history	Seats eliminated			
=== Romblon's at-large district for the House of Representatives of the Commonwealth of the Philippines ===								Seats eliminated			
District re-created May 24, 1945.								Seats eliminated			
(2)	June 11, 1945	May 25, 1946	1st		Leonardo Festín	Nacionalista	Re-elected in 1941.	Seats eliminated			
#	Term of office		Congress	Single seat				Seats eliminated			
#	Start	End	Congress	Image	Member	Party	Electoral history	Seats eliminated			
=== Romblon's at-large district for the House of Representatives of the Philippines ===								Seats eliminated			
4	May 25, 1946	December 30, 1949	1st		Modesto Formilleza	Liberal	Elected in 1946.	Seats eliminated			
5	December 30, 1949	September 1, 1955	2nd		Florencio Moreno	Nacionalista	Elected in 1949.	Seats eliminated			
5	December 30, 1949	September 1, 1955	3rd		Florencio Moreno	Nacionalista	Re-elected in 1953. Resigned on appointment as Secretary of Public Works and Communications.	Seats eliminated			
6	December 30, 1957	December 30, 1969	4th		José D. Moreno	Nacionalista	Elected in 1957.	Seats eliminated			
6	December 30, 1957	December 30, 1969	5th		José D. Moreno	Nacionalista	Re-elected in 1961.	Seats eliminated			
6	December 30, 1957	December 30, 1969	6th		José D. Moreno	Nacionalista	Re-elected in 1965.	Seats eliminated			
7	December 30, 1969	September 23, 1972	7th		Esteban S. Madrona	Liberal	Elected in 1969. Removed from office after imposition of martial law.	Seats eliminated			
District dissolved into the twenty-seat Region IV-A's at-large district for the Interim Batasang Pambansa.								Seats eliminated			
#	Term of office		Batasang Pambansa	Single seat				Seats eliminated			
#	Start	End	Batasang Pambansa	Image	Member	Party	Electoral history	Seats eliminated			
=== Romblon's at-large district for the Regular Batasang Pambansa ===								Seats eliminated			
District re-created February 1, 1984.								Seats eliminated			
8	July 23, 1984	March 25, 1986	2nd		Natalio M. Beltran Jr.	UNIDO	Elected in 1984.	Seats eliminated			
#	Term of office		Congress	Single seat				Seats eliminated			
#	Start	End	Congress	Image	Member	Party	Electoral history	Seats eliminated			
=== Romblon's at-large district for the House of Representatives of the Philippines ===								Seats eliminated			
District re-created February 2, 1987.								Seats eliminated			
9	June 30, 1987	June 30, 1992	8th		Natalio M. Beltran Jr.	Lakas ng Bansa	Re-elected in 1987.	Seats eliminated			
10	June 30, 1992	June 30, 2001	9th		Eleandro Jesus F. Madrona	Lakas	Re-elected in 1992.	Seats eliminated			
10	June 30, 1992	June 30, 2001	10th		Eleandro Jesus F. Madrona	Lakas	Re-elected in 1995.	Seats eliminated			
10	June 30, 1992	June 30, 2001	11th		Eleandro Jesus F. Madrona	Lakas	Re-elected in 1998.	Seats eliminated			
11	June 30, 2001	June 30, 2004	12th		Perpetuo B. Ylagan	Lakas	Elected in 2001.	Seats eliminated			
12	June 30, 2004	June 30, 2007	13th		Eduardo C. Firmalo	KAMPI	Elected in 2004.	Seats eliminated			
(10)	June 30, 2007	June 30, 2016	14th		Eleandro Jesus F. Madrona	Nacionalista	Elected in 2007.	Seats eliminated			
(10)	June 30, 2007	June 30, 2016	15th		Eleandro Jesus F. Madrona	Nacionalista	Re-elected in 2010.	Seats eliminated			
(10)	June 30, 2007	June 30, 2016	16th		Eleandro Jesus F. Madrona	Nacionalista	Re-elected in 2013.	Seats eliminated			
13	June 30, 2016	June 30, 2019	17th		Emmanuel F. Madrona	Nacionalista	Elected in 2016.	Seats eliminated			
(10)	June 30, 2019	Incumbent	18th		Eleandro Jesus F. Madrona	Nacionalista	Elected in 2019.	Seats eliminated			
(10)	June 30, 2019	Incumbent	19th		Eleandro Jesus F. Madrona	Nacionalista	Re-elected in 2022.	Seats eliminated			
(10)	June 30, 2019	Incumbent	20th		Eleandro Jesus F. Madrona	Nacionalista	Re-elected in 2025.	Seats eliminated			

== Election results ==
=== Fifth Republic ===
==== 2025 ====
Candidate	Party	Votes	%
Eleandro Jesus Madrona (incumbent)	Nacionalista Party	129,273	82.37
Vivien Carmona	Independent	25,612	16.32
Agustin Saluague	Independent	2,048	1.31
Total		156,933	100.00
Valid votes		156,933	87.77
Invalid/blank votes		21,867	12.23
Total votes		178,800	100.00
Registered voters/turnout		211,336	84.60
Nacionalista Party hold			
Source: Commission on Elections

==== 2022 ====
Candidate	Party	Votes	%
Eleandro Jesus Madrona (incumbent)	Nacionalista Party	128,996	81.18
Joey Venancio	Aksyon Demokratiko	29,898	18.82
Total		158,894	100.00
Total votes		176,195	–
Registered voters/turnout		206,119	85.48
Nacionalista Party hold			
Source: Commission on Elections

==== 2019 ====
2019 Philippine House of Representatives elections
Party	Candidate	Votes	%
Nacionalista	Eleandro Jesus Madrona	85,961	
Liberal	Eduardo Firmalo	60,602	
Invalid or blank votes			
Total votes			
Nacionalista hold			

==== 2016 ====
2016 Philippine House of Representatives elections
Party	Candidate	Votes	%
Nacionalista	Emmanuel Madrona	57,483	
Independent	Robert Muyo Fabella	57,228	
UNA	Jose Madrid	13,307	
Invalid or blank votes		16,027	
Total votes		144,045	
Nacionalista hold			

==== 2013 ====
2013 Philippine House of Representatives elections
Party	Candidate	Votes	%
Nacionalista	Eleandro Jesus Madrona	66,247	67.28
UNA	Natalio Beltran	20,259	20.57
Margin of victory		45,988	46.70%
Invalid or blank votes		11,963	12.15
Total votes		98,469	100.00
Nacionalista hold			

==== 2010 ====
2010 Philippine House of Representatives elections
Party	Candidate	Votes	%
Nacionalista	Eleandro Jesus Madrona	71,610	57.25
NPC	Alicia Fetalvero	52,326	41.82
Independent	Jose Cesar Cabrera	909	0.73
KBL	Camilo Montesa, Jr.	281	0.22
Valid ballots		125,126	94.62
Invalid or blank votes		7,113	5.38
Total votes		132,239	100.00
Nacionalista hold			

==== 2007 ====
2007 Philippine House of Representatives elections
Party	Candidate	Votes	%
Lakas	Eleandro Jesus Madrona	58,730	
KAMPI	Eduardo Firmalo	51,385	
UNO	Jose Cabrera	1,314	
Invalid or blank votes			
Total votes			
Lakas gain from KAMPI			

=== Third Republic ===
==== 1969 ====
1969 House of Representatives elections: Romblon at-large
Party	Candidate	Votes	%
Liberal	Esteban Madrona		
Nacionalista	Jose Moreno (incumbent)		
Nacionalista	Florencio Moreno (Note: Withdrew a day before the election.)		
Total votes			
Liberal gain from Nacionalista			

==== 1965 ====
1965 House of Representatives elections: Romblon at-large
Party	Candidate	Votes	%	±%
Nacionalista	Jose Moreno (incumbent)	19,989	52.43	−3.32
Liberal	Jovencio Mayor	18,133	47.57	+3.32
Total votes		38,122	100.0	—
Nacionalista hold				

==== 1961 ====
1961 House of Representatives elections: Romblon at-large
Party	Candidate	Votes	%	±%
Nacionalista	Jose Moreno (incumbent)	19,745	55.75	+4.28
Liberal	Jovencio Mayor	15,672	44.25	−3.97
Total votes		35,417	100.0	—
Nacionalista hold				

==== 1957 ====
1957 House of Representatives elections: Romblon at-large
Party	Candidate	Votes	%	±%
Nacionalista	Jose Moreno	13,571	51.47	−0.04
Liberal	Jovencio Mayor	12,713	48.22	−0.27
Progressive	Patriotismo Fondevilla	65	0.25	New
NCP	Francisco Fabon	16	0.06	New
Total votes		26,365	100.0	—
Nacionalista hold				

==== 1953 ====
1953 House of Representatives elections: Romblon at-large
Party	Candidate	Votes	%	±%
Nacionalista	Florencio Moreno (incumbent)	10,642	51.51	−1.08
Liberal	Jovencio Mayor	10,019	48.49	+1.08
Total votes		20,661	100.0	—
Nacionalista hold				

==== 1949 ====
1949 House of Representatives elections: Romblon at-large
Party	Candidate	Votes	%	±%
Nacionalista	Florencio Moreno	8,021	52.59	+16.71
Liberal (Avelino wing)	Modesto Formilleza (incumbent)	7,230	47.41	−16.71
Total votes		15,251	100.0	—
Nacionalista gain from Liberal				

=== Commonwealth period ===
==== 1946 ====
1946 House of Representatives elections: Romblon at-large
Party	Candidate	Votes	%
Nacionalista (Liberal wing) (Note: The Nacionalista Party was split into two wings: those who supported Sergio Osmeña in the presidential election or the "conservative wing", and those who supported Manuel Roxas or the "liberal wing". The liberal wing eventually split off after the election and became the Liberal Party.)	Modesto Formilleza	7,816	64.12
Nacionalista	Leonardo Festin (incumbent)	4,374	35.88
Total votes		12,190	100.0
Liberal gain from Nacionalista			

== See also ==
- Legislative districts of Romblon
