= Irish accordion in the United States =

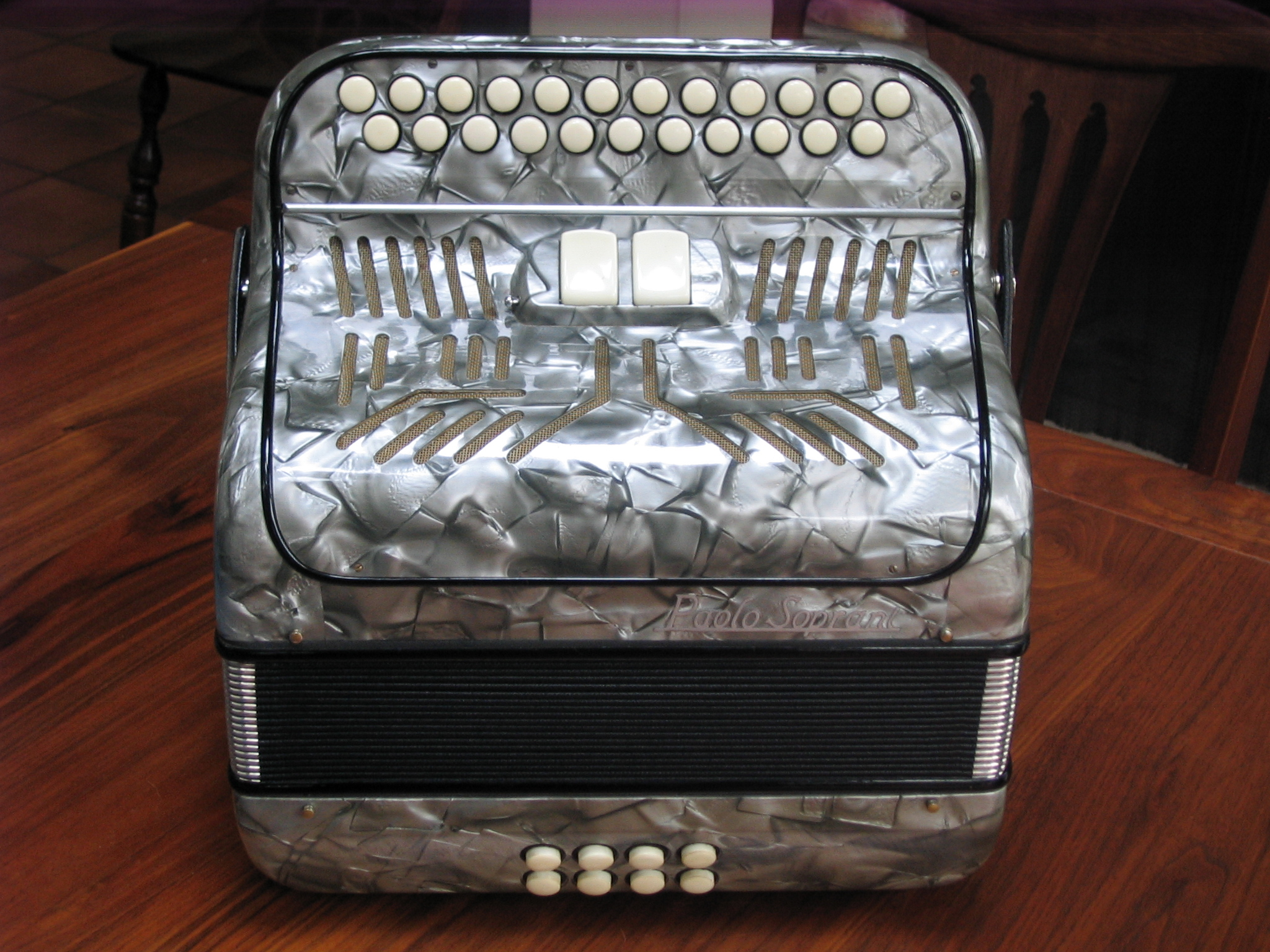
Paolo Soprani button accordion

The Irish button accordion has been popular in the Irish music scene in the United States, evolving in parallel with the instrument's progress in Ireland. The players included Irish emigres, locally born Irish-Americans, and also Americans of no Irish descent who played Irish music. Initially the primary instrument was the 1-row 10-key melodeon, later expanding to two- and three-row instruments.

== Early 1-row melodeon ==
Possibly the earliest person to be recorded anywhere playing Irish music on the accordion was the German-American musician John Kimmel, who recorded tunes on Edison Wax Cylinder in the Brooklyn borough of New York City in 1906. In the 1920s Galway-born accordionist Peter Conlon (c 1885-c 1954) gained prominence in the United States, recording on the 1-row extensively beginning about 1917. In the 1930s Joe Flanagan gained note playing the 1-row in the Flanagan Brothers in New York. With its loudness and durability, the accordion became a staple of the dance-hall bands of the Irish diaspora in America.

== Later chromatic instruments ==
Over time, the instrument began to add keys to enable more chromatic notes; a 13-key instrument that added a partial inner row to the 1-row, then 15, 19, and 20-key instruments. Around 1947, Boston-born Joe Derrane (under the tutelage of Jerry O'Brien) upgraded from a 10-button to a chromatic 2-row instrument and recorded a number of 78rpm albums. At a time when most Irish players of the chromatic 2-row used the inside row as their primary and the outside row for chromatic notes, Derrane played an "outside-in" style, playing in the key of D on a D/C# accordion.

In the mid-1950s Paddy O'Brien and Joe Cooley appeared in the New York Irish music scene. Uniquely, O'Brien and Cooley imitated the violin or flute style of playing, a slow unaccented smooth performance. It was the introduction of legato playing to the accordion. It was completely divorced from the tradition of Irish accordion playing in the States which took into consideration the mechanics of the instrument.

== Modern players ==
After this time there was a slow but steady stream of skilled accordionists from Ireland to the US. Without exception they played a reverse system - the main performance row was the inside one and the half-notes were on the outside row. These included Bobby Gardiner, Joe Nellany, Mike Melanophy, and Martin Mulhaire. This was augmented by the legendary accordionist, songwriter, singer and Irish football star, Dermot O'Brien, who emigrated to the United States in 1983. A new crop of players who were American born, included John Nolan, the first American born player to win the Fleadh Cheoil na hÉireann All-Ireland competition on accordion, in 1982.
