= Marinduque =

Province in Mimaropa, Philippines

- Province
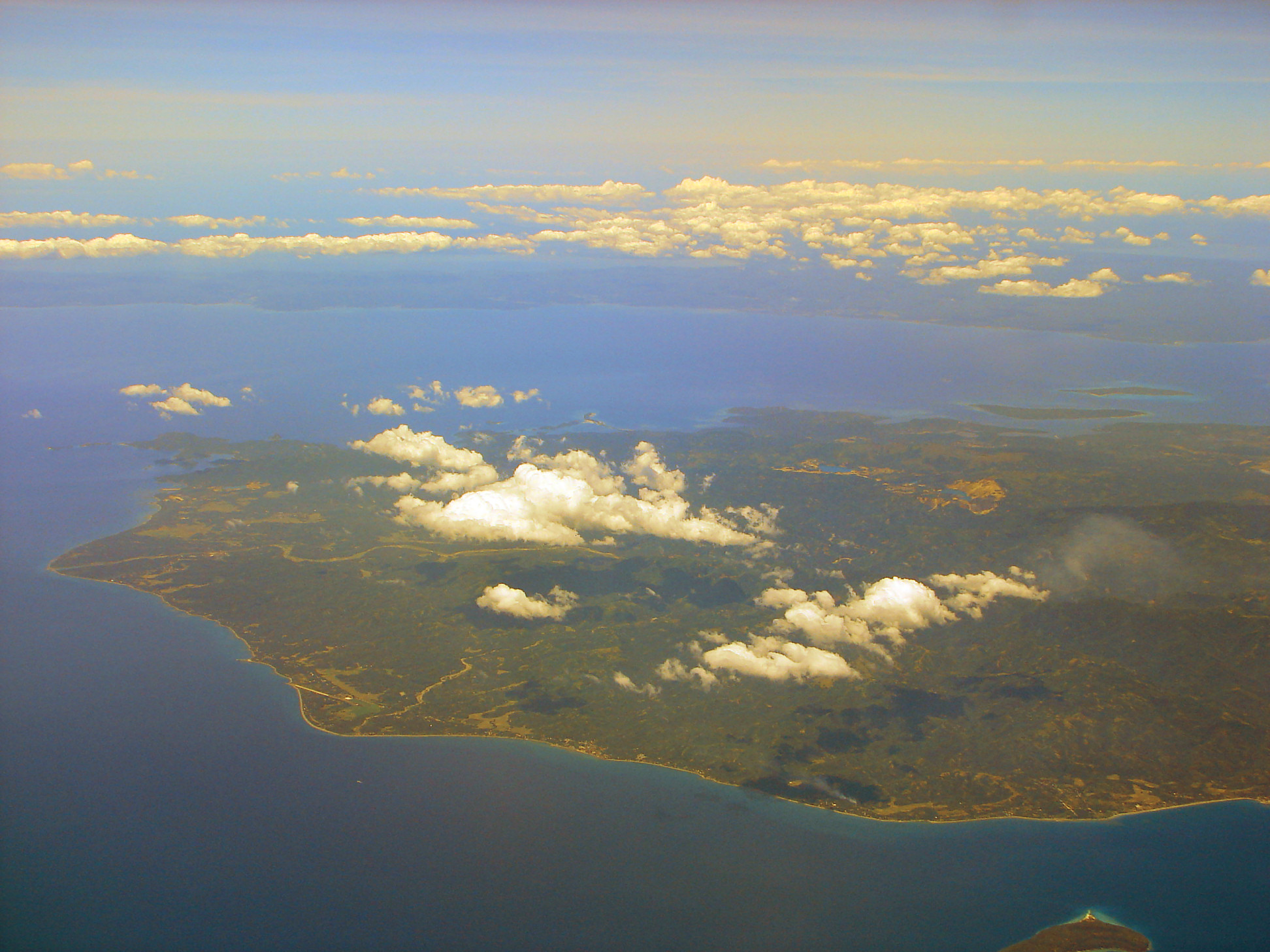
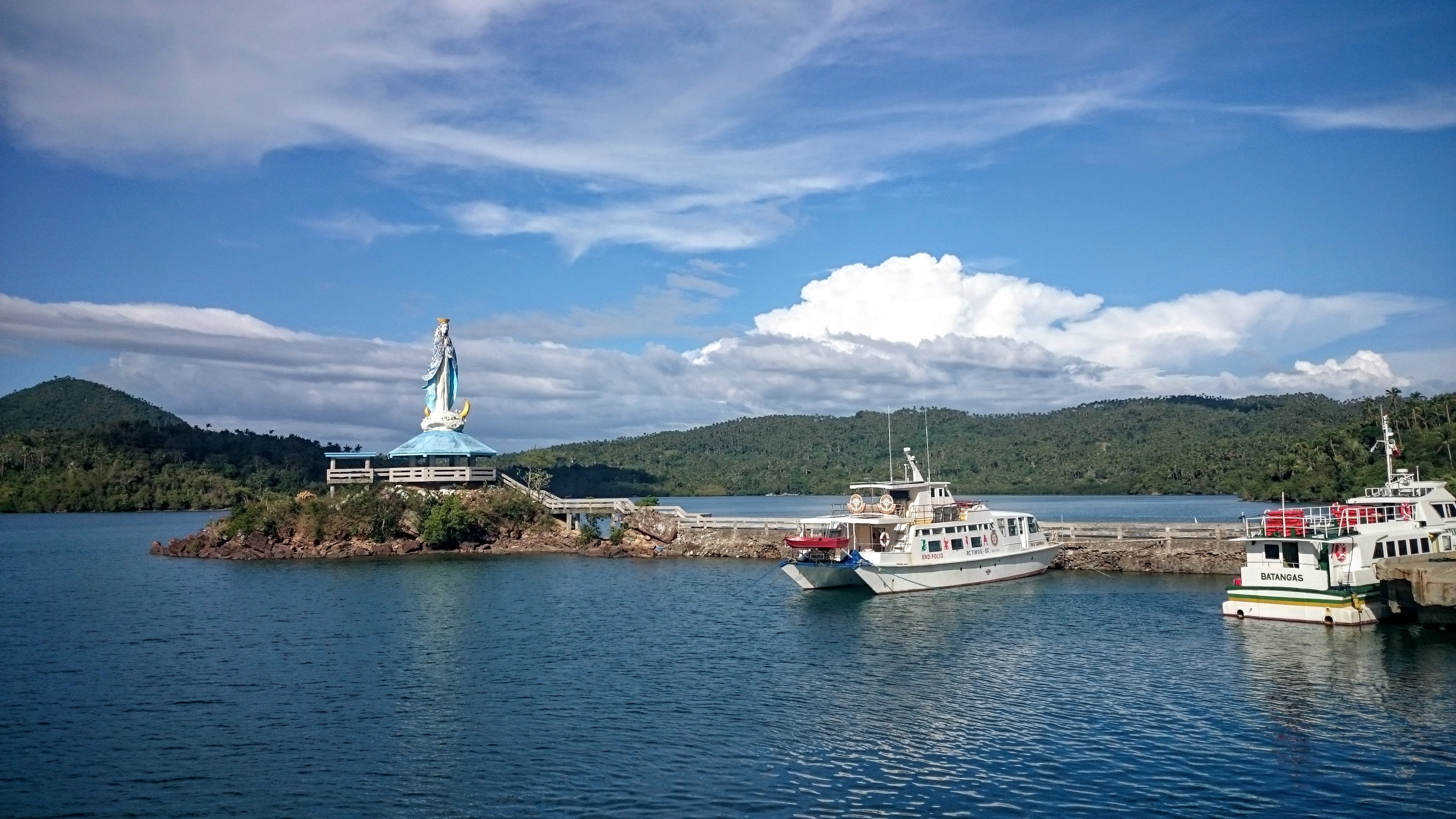
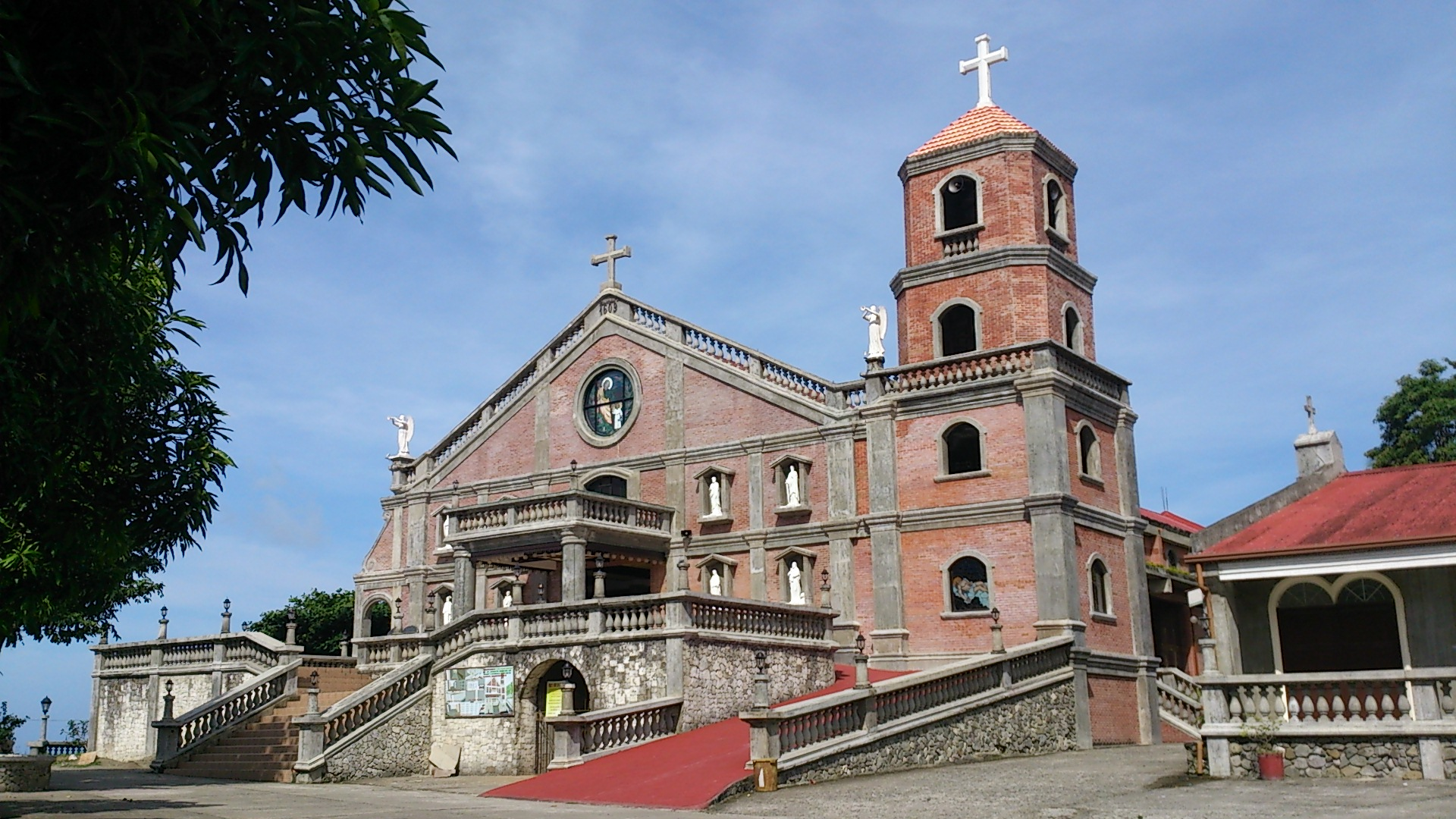
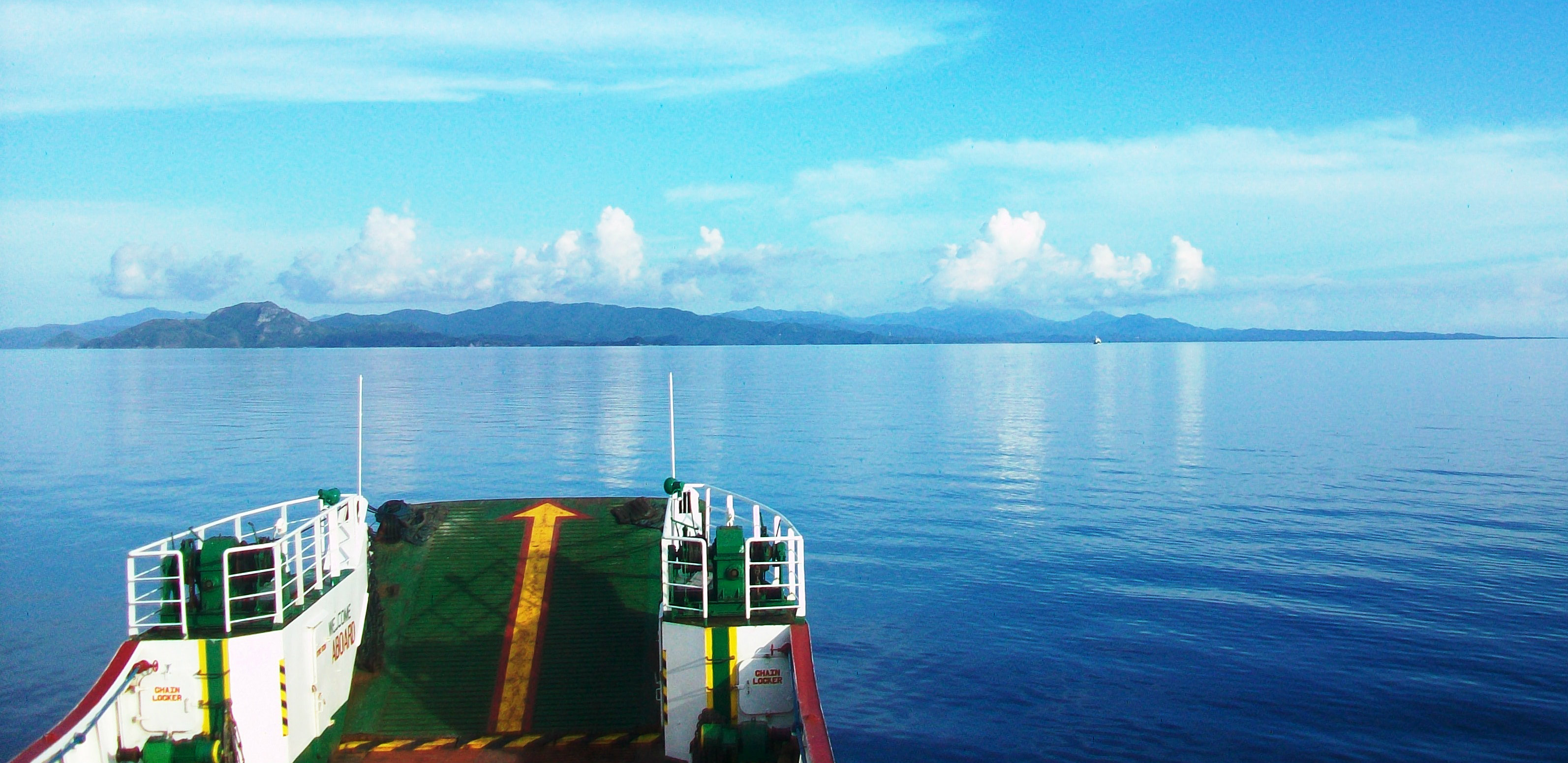
- (Clockwise from top:): Northern section of Marinduque; San Jose Esposo de Maria Church; Marinduque Island viewed from a passenger ship in Tayabas Bay; Port of Balanacan

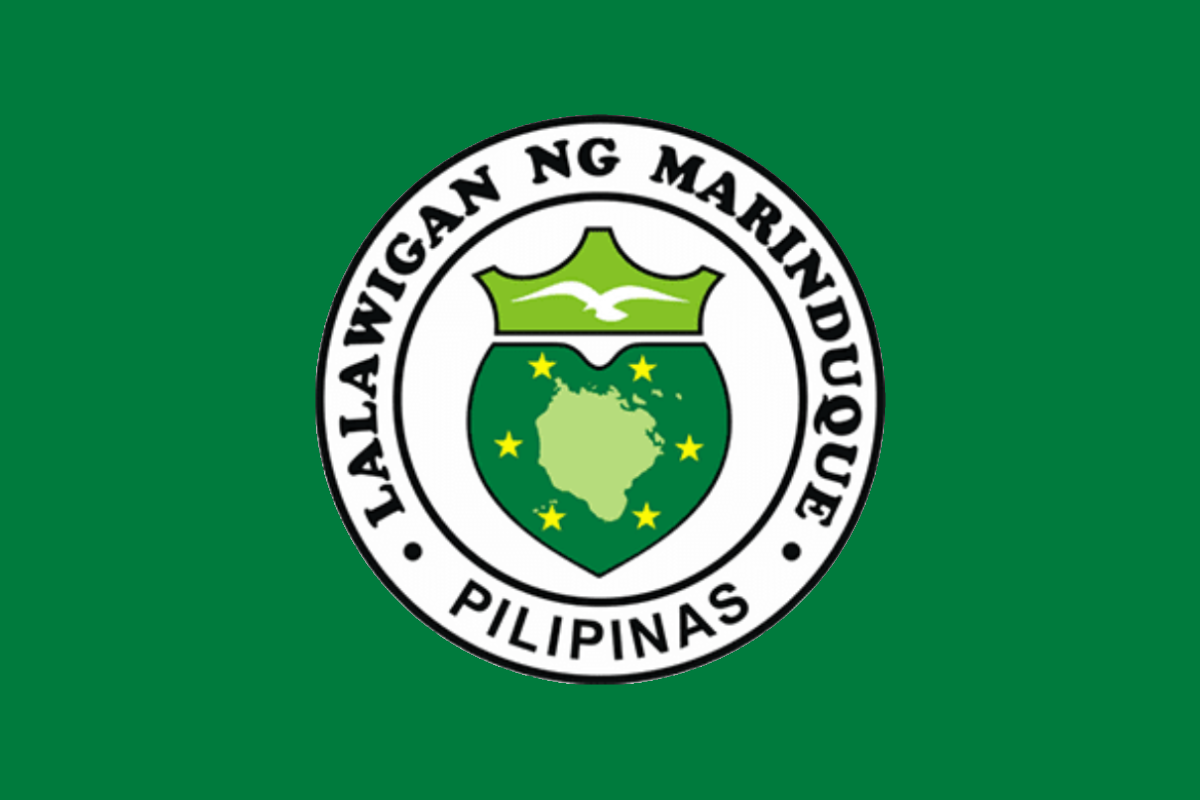
- Flag Seal
- Anthem: Himno ng Marinduque (Marinduque Hymn)
- Location in the Philippines
- Interactive map of Marinduque
- Coordinates: 13°24′N 121°58′E
- Country: Philippines
- Region: Mimaropa
- Founded: May 1, 1901
- Annexation to Tayabas: November 10, 1902
- Reestablished: February 21, 1920
- Capital and largest municipality: Boac

Government
  - Governor: Melecio J. Go (PDP-Laban)
  - Vice Governor: Romulo A. Bacorro Jr. (Independent)
  - Representative: Reynaldo Salvacion
  - Legislature: Marinduque Provincial Board
  - Electorate: 165,436 voters (2025)

Area
  - Total: 952.58 km^{2} (367.79 sq mi)
  - Rank: 76th out of 82
- Highest elevation (Mount Malindig): 1,157 m (3,796 ft)

Population (2024 census)
  - Total: 226,522
  - Rank: 69th out of 82
  - Density: 237.80/km^{2} (615.90/sq mi)
  - Rank: 37th out of 82
  - Households: 60,557
- Demonyms: Marinduquehin; Marinduqueño/a; Marindukanon

Divisions
  - Independent cities: 0
  - Component cities: 0
  - Municipalities: 6: Boac; Buenavista; Gasan; Mogpog; Santa Cruz; Torrijos
  - Barangays: 218
  - Districts: Legislative district of Marinduque

Economy
  - Income class: 2nd provincial income class
  - Poverty incidence: 8.5% (2023)
  - Revenue: ₱ 1,124 million (2024)
  - Assets: ₱ 4,637 million (2024)
  - Expenditure: ₱ 995 million (2024)
  - Liabilities: ₱ 1,322 million (2024)
- Time zone: UTC+8 (PHT)
- PSGC: 174000000
- IDD : area code: +63 (0)42
- ISO 3166 code: PH-MAD
- Spoken languages: Tagalog (Marinduqueño dialect); English
- Website: www.marinduque.gov.ph

Marinduque (/ˌmærənˈduːkeɪ/; Tagalog pronunciation: [maɾinˈduke]), officially the Province of Marinduque (Filipino: Lalawigan/Probinsya ng Marinduque), is an island province in the Philippines located in Southwestern Tagalog Region or Mimaropa, formerly designated as Region IV-B. Its capital is the municipality of Boac, the most populous in the province. Marinduque lies between Tayabas Bay to the north and Sibuyan Sea to the south. It is west of the Bondoc Peninsula of Quezon province in mainland Luzon; east of Mindoro Island; and north of the island province of Romblon. Some parts of the Verde Island Passage, the center of the center of world's marine biodiversity and a protected marine area, are also within Marinduque's provincial waters.

The province of Marinduque was ranked number 1 by the Philippine National Police and Philippine Security Forces as the 2013 Most Peaceful Province of the country due to its low crime rate statistics alternately ranking with the province of Batanes yearly. Furthermore, for almost 200 years, the province has been home to one of the oldest religious festivals in the country, the Moriones celebrated annually every Holy Week.

== Etymology ==
The most accepted theory of the etymology of the province's name is a Hispanized corruption of either malindig or malindug, which means "stand tall" or "elegant", in reference to a potentially active volcano in the southern section of the island, the Mount Malindig.

In 1676, Domingo Navarette wrote in Tratados historicos..., "The island which the people from there call Minolo is named Mindoro by the Spaniards, and that of Malindic we call Marinduque." (trans. by E.H. Blaire and J.A. Robertson)

== History ==
Historical affiliations

Spain 1570–1898
United States of America 1898–1942
Japan 1942–1945
Philippines 1946–present

=== Middle ages ===
The island was called Malindig in Tagalog and Malindog in Visayan languages. It was likely a constituent of the Kingdom of Luzon, due to the immediate Spanish claims to the island after the fall of Manila in May 1570.

It is possible that there were nobility who ruled Malindig since there were principalia or princely figures in Marinduque during Spanish rule.

=== Spanish rule ===
From the Visayan name Malindog, Marinduque became the name of the island in Castilian.

In 1571, Governor-General Miguel López de Legaspi had entrusted (encomienda) Marinduque to Fr. Pedro de Herrera, the first Augustinian priest who introduced Christianity to Marinduqueños.

Marinduque was part of the province of Balayan (now Batangas) in the 16th century, and of Mindoro from the 17th to 19th century.

Antoine-Alfred Marche, a French naturalist, carried out an archaeological investigation in Marinduque from April to July 1881. An abundant yield of urns, vases, gold ornaments, skulls, and other ornaments were found. He brought these to France in 40 crates. Part of it is said to be housed at the Musée de l'Homme ("museum of man") in France. The finds also included an image of wooden polytheistic religious statues (anito) which at the time were already called pastores by Marinduqueños.

One of the artifacts found by Marche also found its way to the National Museum of Natural History of the Smithsonian Institution in Washington, D.C. (Catalogue No. A127996-0, Department of Anthropology, NMNH, Smithsonian Institution). Fragile jarlets that were found were said to have travelled from China to Marinduque. Buried in a cave for centuries and excavated in the late 19th century, these were brought to Paris and one was then brought to the Smithsonian Institution museum.

=== First Philippine Republic ===
Marinduque, governed through the province of Mindoro, was a constituent of the First Philippine Republic from January 1899 to April 1901 under President Emilio Aguinaldo.

During the Philippine–American War, Marinduque was the first province where American invaders established concentration camps. In the Battle of Pulang Lupa, under the direction of Colonel Maximo Abad, 250 Filipino soldiers defeated 54 American infantrymen.

=== American rule ===
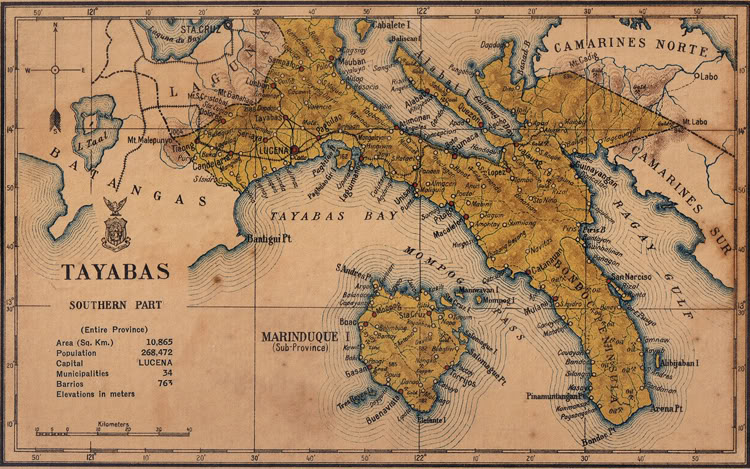
Map of southern Tayabas (now Quezon) in 1918, showing Marinduque as part of the province

Col. Abad after capturing the Americans later surrendered on 15 April 1901, upon orders from President Aguinaldo and due to the capture of Governor Martin Lardizabal and two other officials who were held hostage by the Americans at Fort Santiago.

On 23 June 1902, by virtue of Act No. 423, the US-Philippine Commission annexed the islands of Mindoro (now two separate provinces) and Lubang (now part of Occidental Mindoro) to the province. Four months later, on the 10th of November, Marinduque was annexed to the province of Tayabas (now Quezon) by virtue of Act No. 499.

On 21 February 1920, Act No. 2280 was passed by the Philippine Congress, reestablishing Marinduque as a separate province.

According to Henry Otley Beyer, an American anthropologist, while many other accidental discoveries and finds have been recorded from time to time and European and Filipino scientists had casually explored a few burial caves and sites, no systematic work had been done anywhere else prior to these explorations. After Marche, the next important archaeological work was undertaken by Dr. Carl Guthe in the Visayas Island Group in 1922.

=== Commonwealth of the Philippines ===
In November 1935, Marinduque became a province of the Commonwealth of the Philippines under Pres. Manuel Quezon. The Philippine Commonwealth Army was stationed in the province; the general headquarters was active from 1935 to 1942.

=== Japanese occupation ===
In 1942, during the Second World War, Japanese Imperial forces landed on Marinduque. The province was re-annexed to Tayabas, but re-established as an independent province in 1945.

=== Second Philippine Republic ===
In October 1943, Marinduque became a province of the Second Philippine Republic under President Jose P. Laurel. The sovereign, however, was the Japanese emperor.

In 1945, combined American and Filipino troops liberated the province from Japanese forces, returning the province to the Commonwealth of the Philippines under President Sergio Osmeña. In addition to the return of the Philippine Commonwealth Army, the Philippine Constabulary was also stationed in the province. These were active from 1945 to 1946.

=== Third Philippine Republic to present ===
Archaeological findings that help inform Marinduque's history are exhibited at the Marinduque Museum in Poblacion at Boac and in foreign museums. The artifacts are to be analysed to aid the historiography of the island and the province.

== Geography ==
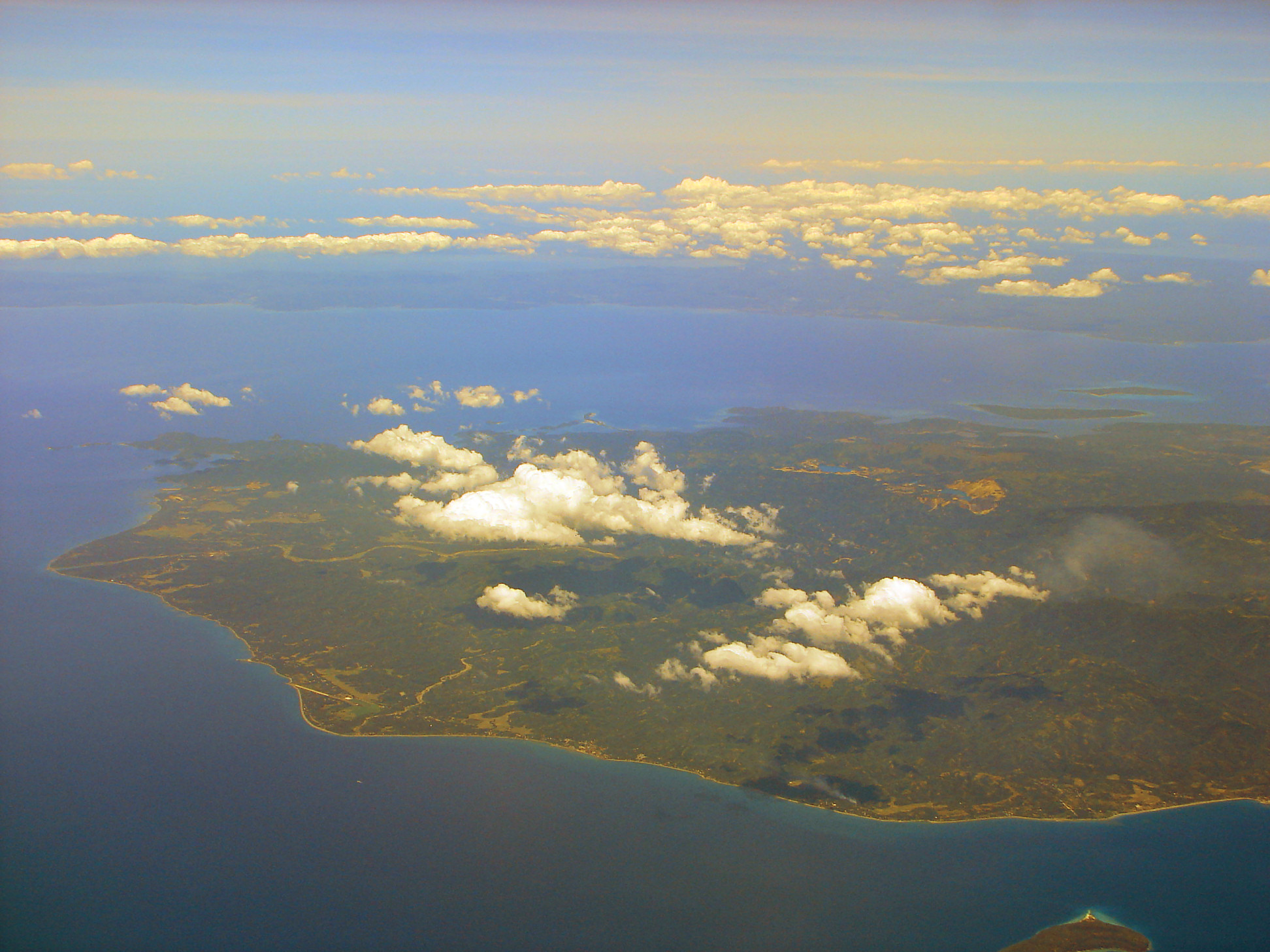
Northern section

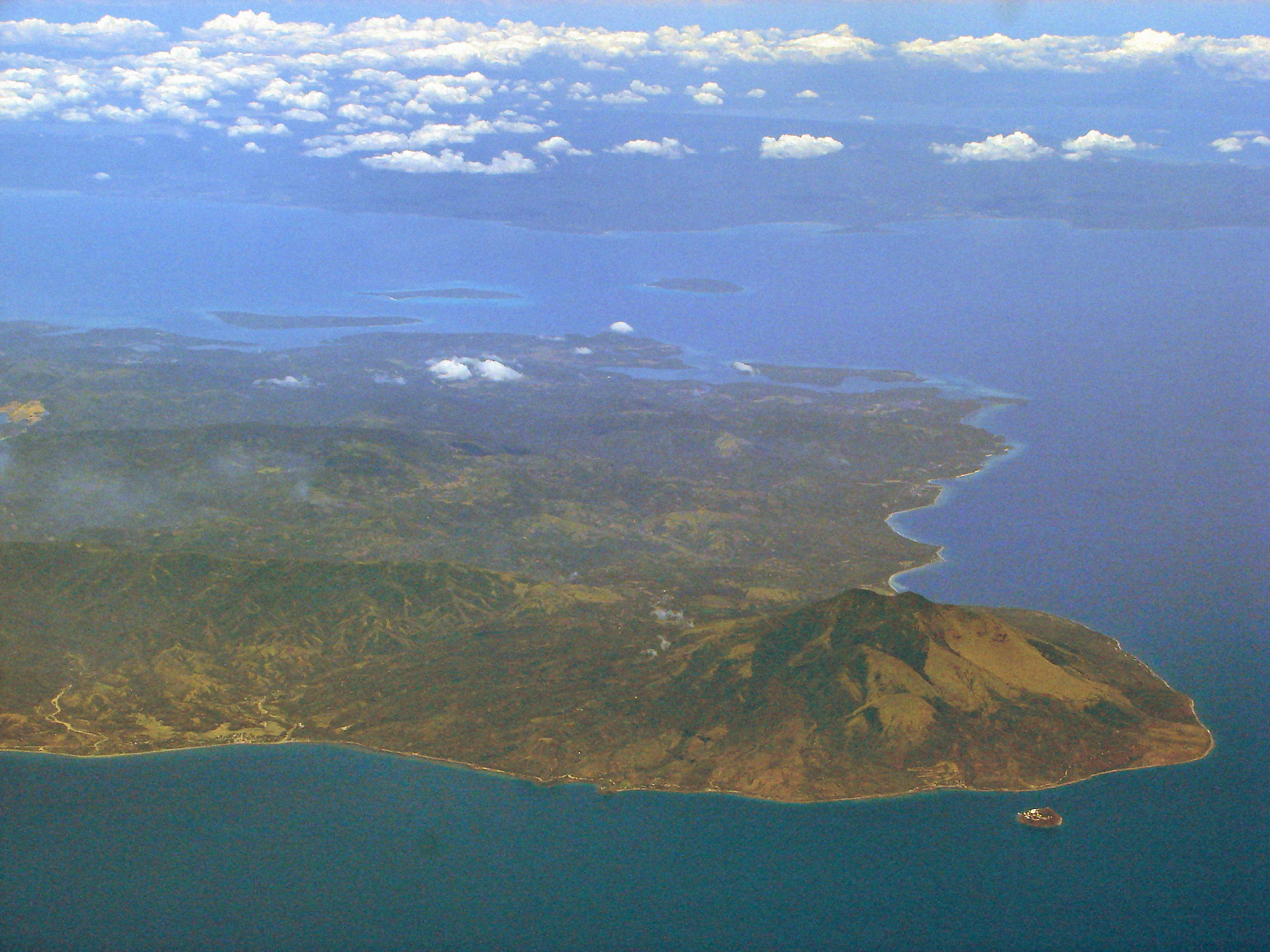
Southern section

Marinduque is considered as the geographical center of the Philippine archipelago by the Luzon Datum of 1911, the mother of all Philippine geodetic surveys. The province is a "heart-shaped" island with a total land area of 952.58 square kilometers (367.79 sq mi), situated between Tayabas Bay in the north and Sibuyan Sea to the south. It is separated from the Bondoc Peninsula in Quezon by the Mongpong Pass. West of Marinduque is Tablas Strait, which separates it from Mindoro Island.

Some of the smaller islands to the northeast are Polo Island, Maniwaya Island, and Mongpong Island. Southwest portion includes the Tres Reyes Islands and Elephant Island.

The highest peak in Marinduque is Mount Malindig (formerly called Mt. Marlanga), a potentially active stratovolcano with an elevation of 1,157 meters (3,796 ft) above sea level, located at the southern tip of the island.

Cave Systems

Various cave systems occupy the province, including:

- Bathala Cave located near Barangay Ipil in Sta. Cruz town;
- Tarug Caves is located at Barangay Tarug, in the town of Mogpog, a three-chambered caves of limestone formation. It rises steeply to 270 feet above the ground and is located 331 ft above sea level. The pinnacle is barely 3 square meters.
- Bagumbungan Cave, a cave system in San Isidro and Punong with complex subterranean river
- Talao Caves, a 12 series of caves overlooking the western part of the island.

=== Climate ===
Marinduque has a Type III climate, having rainfall more or less evenly distributed throughout the year with no clear boundary between dry and wet seasons. The annual mean, maximum, and minimum temperatures were calculated at 27.0 °C (80.6 °F), 32.9 °C (91.2 °F) and 22.3 °C (72.1 °F) respectively. The humidity average is 78% year-round with an average annual rainfall totaling 2,034.6 mm (80.1 inches).

=== Administrative divisions ===
Marinduque comprises 6 municipalities, further subdivided into 218 barangays. A double legislative districts encompasses all towns.

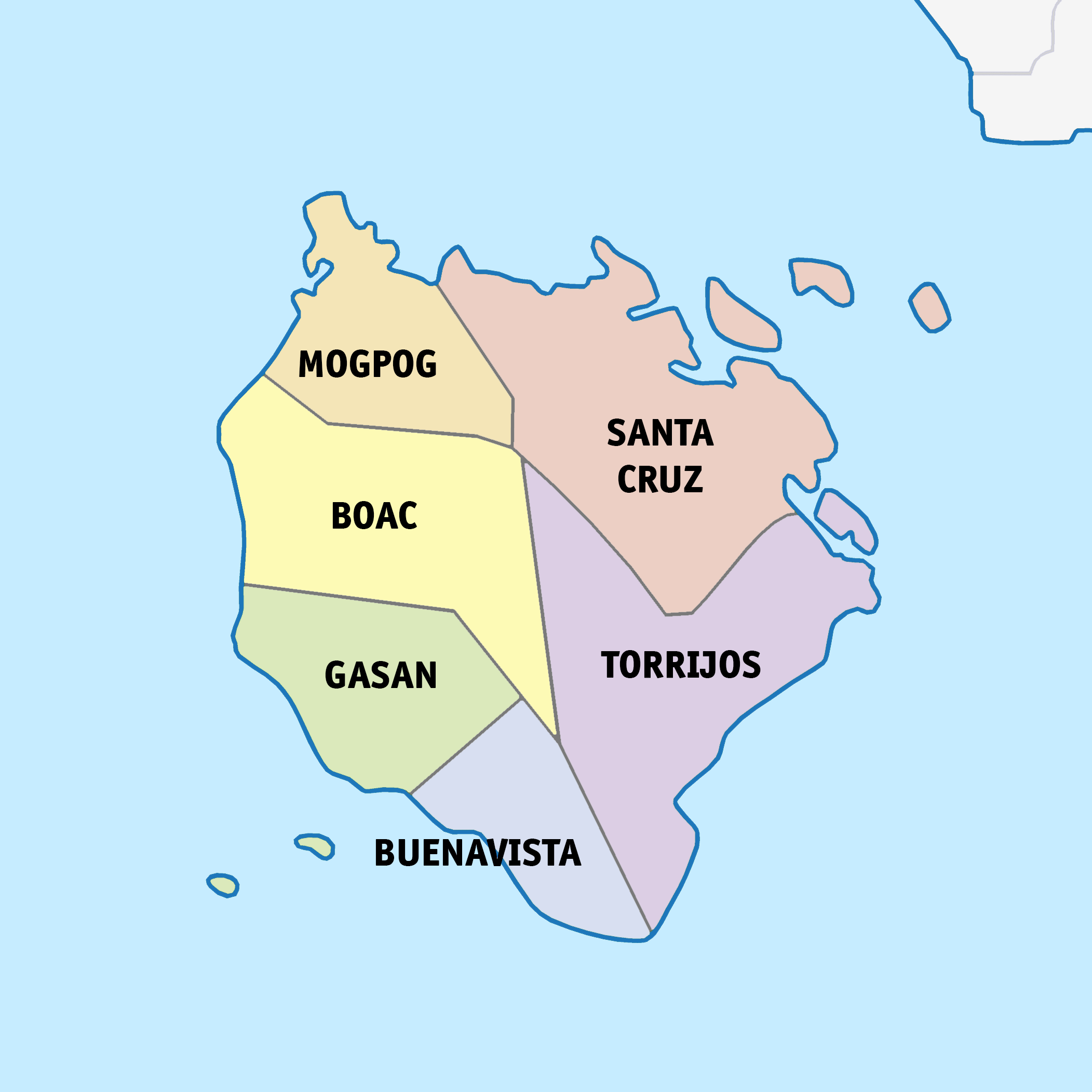
Political map of Marinduque

Municipality (Note: The globe icon marks the town center.)		Population			±% p.a.	Area		Density (2020)		Barangay
		(2020)		(2015)		km^{2}	sq mi	/km^{2}	/sq mi	
Boac	†	23.9%	57,283	54,730	+0.87%	212.70	82.12	270	700	61
Buenavista		10.9%	26,043	23,988	+1.58%	81.25	31.37	320	830	15
Gasan		15.1%	36,197	34,828	+0.74%	100.88	38.95	360	930	25
Mogpog		14.4%	34,516	34,043	+0.26%	108.06	41.72	320	830	37
Santa Cruz		22.9%	54,692	56,408	−0.59%	270.77	104.54	200	520	55
Torrijos		12.7%	30,476	30,524	−0.03%	178.92	69.08	170	440	25
Total			239,207	234,521	+0.38%	952.58	367.79	250	650	218
	† Provincial capital					Municipality				

Boac
The capital of the province. The most populous town in the province Boac remains the center of industry, culture, economy, and education. Most government and private offices are in the municipality of Boac. It also borders all five municipalities. Mogpog to the North, Santa Cruz to the Northeast, Torrijos to the East, Buenavista to the South, and Gasan to the Southwest. Boac is named after the Tagalog word, biak, which means divided, due to the Boac River dividing the town in the geographic north and south.

Gasan
The Cultural Nerve Center of the province. Dubbed as one of the cleanest and greenest municipalities in the Philippines, Gasan's land area covers a forest reserve in the eastern part. It is also the gateway to the island of Mindoro. Handicrafts and the famous Kalutang boasts from the town of Gasan. It was named after gasang-gasang, a local term for corals found in the municipality.

Buenavista
The smallest of the six municipalities. It was once part of the municipality of Gasan known as Sabang. It was named such because of the "good view" of the Tablas Strait and offshore islands.

Torrijos
Named after three purported origins; 1) from Gen. Torrijos, 2) from torrillos, referring to the cows which pastured in its vast plains, and 3) from torre y hijos, referring to the watchtower men guarding the parish. Torrijos is deemed to be the summer capital of the Province and is known for its locally-grown strawberries.

Santa Cruz
The largest of all the six municipalities in terms of land area and the second most populous town after Boac. It is considered a secondary municipality after Boac (since it is the capital). Together with Boac, it is also a first-class municipality with established industries and commercial routines.

Mogpog
The Primary Gateway of the Province through the Balanacan Port. It is the original home of the Moriones Lenten Rites and Kangga Festival. Mogpog was named after the Tagalog word, mag-aapog or kiln makers abundant in the municipality.

== Demographics ==
Population census of Marinduque

Year	Pop.	±% p.a.
1903	51,674	—
1918	56,868	+0.64%
1939	81,768	+1.74%
1948	85,828	+0.54%
1960	114,586	+2.44%
1970	144,109	+2.32%

Year	Pop.	±% p.a.
1975	162,804	+2.48%
1980	173,715	+1.31%
1990	185,524	+0.66%
1995	199,910	+1.41%
2000	217,392	+1.81%
2007	229,636	+0.76%

Year	Pop.	±% p.a.
2010	227,828	−0.29%
2015	234,521	+0.55%
2020	239,207	+0.42%
2024	226,522	−1.30%

Source: Philippine Statistics Authority

The population of Marinduque in the 2024 census was 239,207 people, with a density of 250 inhabitants per square kilometre or 650 inhabitants per square mile, hence, it is the most densely populated province in the Mimaropa Region.

=== Religion ===
Marinduque is resided by various religious groups, with Catholics making up the greatest proportion with 70%. The Iglesia Filipina Independiente has 25% of the population and the rest belongs to the different denominations such as the Church of Jesus Christ of Latter-day Saints, Iglesia ni Cristo, and various Mainline Protestant denominations which include Assemblies of God, Baptists, JIL, Methodists, Presbyterian, Seventh-day Adventist Church (SDA), and the non-denominational Evangelical churches also known as Born-Again Christians. Muslims, Anitists, animists, and atheists are also present in the province.

=== Language ===
The version of Tagalog spoken in Marinduque, known as the Marinduque Tagalog, has been described as "the root from which modern national forms of speech have sprung," where remnants of archaic Tagalog could be found, spoken in a lilting manner by its inhabitants. If this linguistic theory is accurate, Marinduque's Tagalog has contributed significantly to the development of the official Philippine national language.

To this day, Marinduqueños speak an old variation of the Tagalog language that is very close to the way Tagalog was spoken before the Spanish colonization. According to language experts, the Tagalog dialects of Marinduque are the most divergent, especially the Eastern Marinduque dialect, perhaps due to the relative isolation from the Tagalogs of mainland Luzon and also perhaps due to the influence of the Visayan and Bikol migrants. Many educated Marinduqueños speak versions of Tagalog during Spanish colonial era and with English terms, closer to modern Filipino or standard Tagalog, because of mass media and modern versions of Tagalog Bible, and retaining Visayan and Bikol influence.

Linguist Rosa Soberano's 1980 The Dialects of Marinduque Tagalog goes into great depth concerning the dialects spoken there. The following is a verb chart which outlines the conjugation of the Eastern Marinduque dialect of Tagalog:

	Infinitive	Contemplative (future actions)	Progressive (past and present actions)	Completed (past actions)	Imperative
Actor Focus 1	-um- (gumawa) (future actions)	má- (mágawâ)	ná- (nágawâ)	-um- (gumawa)	0 (gawa)
Actor Focus 2	mag- (magbigay)	(ma)ga- ([ma]gabigay)	naga- (nagabigay)	nag- (nagbigay)	pag- (pagbigay)
Object Focus 1	-in (kainin)	a- (akainin)	ina- (inakain)	-in- (kinain)	-a (kaina)
Object Focus 2	i- (isulat)	a- (asulat)	ina- (inasulat)	i- -in- (isinulat)	-an (sulatan)
Object Focus 3	-an (tawagan) (future actions)	a-...-an (atawagan)	ina- ... -an (inatawagan)	-in- ... -an (tinawagan)	-i (tawagi)

Linguist Christopher Sundita observed that some of the affixes in Marinduque Tagalog, particularly "a-" and "ina-," are affixes used in Asi (Bantoanon), a Visaya language spoken in Romblon, just south of Marinduque. Marinduque Tagalog, like the Tagalog spoken over two centuries ago, had an additional verb category, the imperative, which was used for commands and requests (e.g., Matulog ka na - Go to sleep). Even then, the imperative and the infinitive were used side by side in expressing commands; but in standard Tagalog, apparently the infinitive became used exclusively. And in the Eastern Marinduque dialect, imperative affixes are very much alive.

== Economy ==
Poverty incidence of Marinduque (%)

Source: Philippine Statistics Authority

Marinduque is an agricultural province, primarily growing rice and coconuts. Handicrafts from Marinduque are also exported to dıfferent parts of the world, and fishing is another important part of the economy. Mining was once an important player in the economy until a mining accident (the Marcopper Mining Disaster) occurred, bringing the industry to a standstill on the island and causing enormous damage to the inhabitants. The provincial government has just recently sued Marcopper's parent company, Placer Dome, for $100 million in damages. Placer Dome was purchased in 2006 by Barrick Gold, who has now been joined in the lawsuit.

A significant role in Marinduque's economy is also played by tourism, especially during the Lenten season. While this is not one of the larger parts of the island's economy, it has shown great growth. Recently, some residents are now engaged in butterfly farming. Butterflies are raised for export to countries in both Europe and the Americas. Locally, live butterflies are released in celebration on different occasions, such as birthdays, weddings, and some corporate events.

== Culture ==
=== Festivals ===
The Moriones Festival , also known as Moriones Lenten Rites, is an annual festival, locally known as "Moryonan", celebrated in Marinduque from March to April. In Santa Cruz, Gasan, Boac, and Mogpog, a parade of people dressed as "Moryons" can be seen on the main road connecting the towns of the island. Boac and Santa Cruz, the biggest towns in the province, show a reenactment in the evening of the actual event when Longinus, a blind soldier, punctures Jesus with his spear and blood droplets from the wound restore Longinus's sight.

=== Music ===
Marinduque is home to the kalutang, a musical instrument made of two pieces of wood that produce different note ranges depending on its size. A band of 10 to 12 can create music with this instrument. In 2011, the kalutang instrument was cited by the National Commission for Culture and the Arts as one of the intangible cultural heritage of the Philippines under the traditional craftsmanship category that the government may nominate in the UNESCO Intangible Cultural Heritage Lists.

== Government ==
Marinduque had its own Governor running a sub-government under Tayabas (now Quezon) in 1902 and as a provincial government after gaining its independence from Tayabas in 1920. The Governor is assisted by the Vice Governor, who presides over the Marinduque Provincial Board. Since 2025, the Governor is Mel Go.

== Transport ==
Marinduque was formerly served by direct Cebu Pacific flights to-and-from Manila and Marinduque Airport which is located in Masiga, roughly between Gasan and Boac, but this has been discontinued. Presently there are no commercial airlines flying to Marinduque. The province is also served by a seaport in Balanacan transporting cargo and passengers to and from Lucena in Quezon province. There is also a daily boat trip from General Luna in Quezon province to Santa Cruz and vice versa which stops at Maniwaya Island to drop off cargo and passengers.

== Media ==
There are four radio stations in the province, three of which are operated by the Radyo Natin Network and the other, FM Nutriskwela Community Radio Station Radyo Kamalindig 94.1 DZNS, by the National Nutrition Council. Radyo Natin Network operates the call sign DZVH at 105.7 MHz on FM radio from Boac, as well as the call sign DWMD 104.5 MHz on FM radio from Santa Cruz and 100.1 FM from Torrijos. As for print media, there is no existing newspapers circulating in the province, aside from broadsheet and tabloid newspapers from Manila. Marinduque News Network, meanwhile, provides provincial and national news and information via the web and social media. In 2018, Marinduque News Network ventured with Lucky Seven Cable Services Corporation, a cable provider in Marinduque to showcase their programs through local cable television. The online news website which was founded by Romeo Mataac, Jr. in 2016 is located in Boac, Marinduque.

There are also existing cable providers and local cable stations operating in several municipalities in the province, namely Lucky Seven Cable Services Corporation (Boac), Marinduque Cable Television, Inc. (Boac), and G.R. CATV Services (Santa Cruz & Torrijos). Aside from these cable stations, there are also distributors of direct-to-home (DTH) satellite TV such as Cignal Digital TV, Dream Satellite TV, G Sat, and Sky Direct who provide television services for its subscribers.

== Education ==
=== Tertiary ===
- Buyabod School of Arts and Trades (BSAT) — Buyabod, Santa Cruz
- Educational Systems Technological Institute (ESTI) — Murallon, Boac
- Lighthouse Maritime Schools, Inc. (LMSI) — Boac
- Malindig Institute (MI) — Lapu-Lapu, Santa Cruz
- Marinduque Midwest College (MMC) — Dili, Gasan
- Marinduque State University (MARSU) — College of Agriculture in Poctoy, Torrijos
- Marinduque State University (MARSU) — College of Fisheries in Banuyo, Gasan
- Marinduque State University (MARSU) — Main College Campus in Tanza, Boac
- Marinduque State University (MARSU) — Marinduque Community University in Matalaba, Santa Cruz
- Marinduque State University (MARSU) — Santa Cruz Annex, Santa Cruz
- Marinduque Victorian University (MVU) — Buenavista
- Saint Mary's College of Boac (SMCB) — Isok, Boac
- Santa Cruz Institute (SCI) — Banahaw, Santa Cruz
- Torrijos Poblacion School of Arts and Trades (TPSAT) — Poctoy, Torrijos

== Notable people ==
- Cardinal Ricardo Jamin Vidal – archbishop emeritus of Cebu was born February 6, 1931, in Mogpog.
- Msgr. Hipolito Araña – Retired priest of the Diocese of Balanga, Bataan.
- Zaijian Jaranilla – Filipino actor and model having primary allegiance with ABS-CBN Corporation under Star Magic and secondary allegiance conditionally with other media companies (GMA Network and TV5 Network) who is best known for his role as the orphan Santino in the 2009–2013 ABS-CBN religious-themed teleserye, May Bukas Pa. A native of Gloria, Oriental Mindoro, he spends his vacation at Brgy. Amoingon, Boac.
- Zymic Jaranilla – Zaijian Jaranilla's sibling who originally worked with ABS-CBN briefly and currently a GMA Network contract artist. Like Zaijian, he spends vacation at Boac.
