= Schwyzerörgeli =

Musical instrument

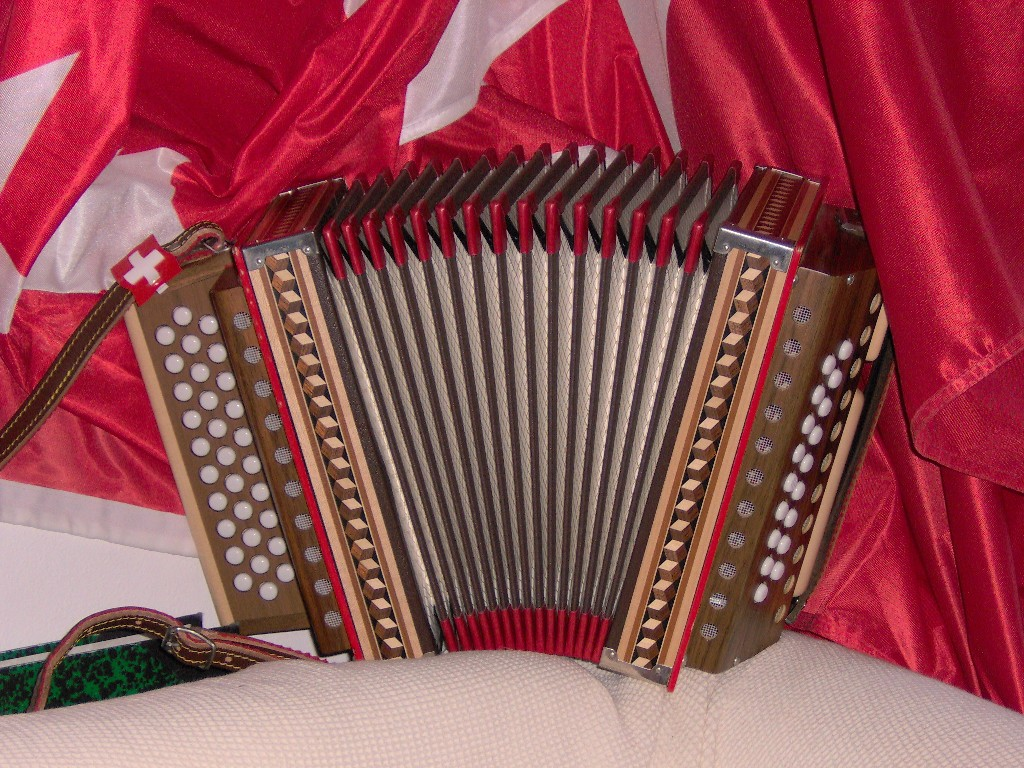

The Schwyzerörgeli is a small diatonic button accordion used in Swiss folk music. It produces a mellow sound and is a popular instrument in folk dance and Ländler ensembles with clarinet and double bass.

The first Schwyzerörgeli was made by Robert Iten of Pfäffikon in the canton of Schwyz in the 1880s. Another early maker was Alois Eichhorn. Its precursor was the Langnauerli, a quieter instrument based on the hand organ which was produced in Langnau im Emmental in the canton of Bern.

A typical Schwyzerörgeli today has three voices, 18 bass buttons and 31 treble buttons, and a rectangular casing.

Örgeli is the diminutive form of the word Orgel (organ). Outside of Switzerland the instrument is not well known and is hard to find.

== History ==
The accordion was brought to Switzerland in the 1830s, soon after its invention in Vienna. The earliest accordions were the typically one- or two-row diatonic button accordions, which carried on in Switzerland as the Langnauerli, named for Langnau in canton Bern. The Langnauerli usually has one treble row of buttons and two bass/chord buttons on the left hand end, much like the accordion used in Cajun music (minus the stops), but is sometimes seen with 2 or 3 rows on a stepped keyboard. The Schwyzerörgeli was a further development from the 1880s, with changes in the treble fingering and a flat keyboard (not stepped), and unisonoric basses.

The early makers including Eichhorn (Schwyz) and Nussbaumer (Bachenbülach) experimented with different arrangements and numbers of buttons. The typical Schwyzerörgeli today has 18 bass buttons arranged in two rows (one for bass notes and one for major chords), and 31 treble buttons on the RH arranged in 3 rows with a fingering similar to the 'club' system. The basses progress in 4ths like the Stradella system seen on chromatic and piano accordions, but in the opposite direction. Some Schwyzerörgelis have fewer buttons in the upper/inside row on the RH much like the club models, or more buttons - sometimes an extra row on the outside - and fewer or more basses. Since Swiss music rarely uses minor chords, even Örgelis with 4 bass rows usually have no minor chords but majors and 7ths instead. The only other variety still being made in substantial numbers today is the Schwyzerörgeli with chromatic fingering, usually with a C system (C-Griff) treble side and Stradella bass fingering, including the Minor Chords to allow for the possibility of playing Tango Music if a Bandoneon Player is unavailable. The Schwyzerörgeli sound (MHH which is like LMM but an Octave higher), falls in between an Accordion & a Bandoneon making it an alternative to the Bandoneon.

== Tuning ==
As most diatonic accordions are centered on certain keys, the Schwyzerörgeli is usually tuned in 'flat' keys to fit with the clarinet, with the outer row giving a B♭ scale, the next row E♭, and the next giving a mixture of notes allowing music to be played in A♭, D♭ and G♭ when fingered across the rows. Of course this means each key has a different fingering. This instrument is labelled a 'B-Örgeli' or 'B/Es' (B♭/E♭). Less common keys are A/D, C/F and B/E.

The Schwyzerörgeli has a unique tuning (tone, voicing), called Schwyzerton. On the treble side, each button has 3 sets of reeds, with one main set and two other sets an octave higher than the first, each tuned slightly apart to give a somewhat tremolo sound. The reeds are arranged around one big reed block with a tone chamber inside, rather than a separate reed block for each row like most accordions. Some Örgelis only have 2 sets of reeds tuned an octave apart, Bandonion-style. The Örgeli with 2 sets of treble reeds of the same octave, tuned slightly apart (tremolo or 'wet'), is called a Wienerörgeli (Viennese Örgeli) because of the 'Viennese' tuning (Wienerton) which is widespread among button accordions around the world such as those made by Hohner and the Steirische Harmonika. The internal construction (RH reed blocks) of this Örgeli also is not like the others but more like other accordions, but the fingering and the appearance is of the typical Schwyzerörgeli. In Canton Bern, there is a variety of Schwyzerörgeli called the Bernerörgeli, pioneered by Ernst Salvisberg, distinguished primarily by a beveled bass end and usually dry tuning (no tremolo), called Bernerton.

== See also ==
- Music of Switzerland
