= Denis Novato =

Slovenian musician (born 1976)

Denis Novato (born 4 May 1976) is a Slovene musician from Italy, and world champion player of the diatonic accordion. He has been a musician since the late 1980s.

Novato was born in Dolina near Trieste, Italy. From the age of ten he studied for Susanne Zerial. At the international accordion festival in Urbino in 1988 his solo performance won the first prize, and he has later won more than 20 international competitions. Since 1991 he has also teaching, both in Austria and Slovenia. His first recording on cassette was released in 1995 and on CD in 1997. In 1999 he was awarded the title of world champion of the diatonic accordion. He has composed more than 50 original songs. He has toured Russia in 1995, Australia in 1997 and again in 1999, and later also the United States and Canada. In November 2005 he visited the Florida Accordion Association Annual Smash and in March 2006 he visited the Texas Accordion Association Festival.

== Discography ==
- Denis Novato, A la Salute dei Nostri Padri, CD, 1997, FreeDB
- Denis Novato, Od Trsta do Triglava, CD, 1998, FreeDB
- Denis Novato, O du mein Osterreich - O moja Avstrija - O tu mia Austria, CD, 1999, FreeDB
- Denis Novato & seine Freunde, Oberkrainer Spezialitäten, CD, Bogner Records (BOG010173), March 22, 2002, FreeDB
- Denis Novato Trio, Gruss aus Triest, CD, Bogner Records (BOG011193), January 2, 2004, FreeDB
- Denis Novato Trio, Mit Dir Unterwegs, CD, Bogner Records (BOG011783), February 1, 2005
