= Peter Wyper =

Peter Wyper (1861 in Lanarkshire, Scotland – 1920) was a player of the diatonic button accordion (or melodeon), and is believed to be the first person to ever be recorded playing the accordion, which he did on wax cylinder in 1903. Peter and his brother Daniel Wyper (b. 1872) recorded together as the Wyper Brothers, performing Scottish and Irish music.

== Discography ==
- Highland Schottische (July 1909, 78 rpm)
- Selection of Hornpipes (Columbia Records, 78 rpm)
- Selection of Jigs (Columbia Records, 78 rpm)
- The Deil Among The Tailors/High Level Hornpipe(Regal Records, G6952, 78 rpm)
- Stirling Castle/Flowers of Edinburgh (Regal Records, G6959, 78 rpm)
- Eightsome Reel/Mary of Argyle (Solo) and Jenkin's Hornpipe (Regal Records, G6985, 78 rpm)
- Selection of Irish Airs/Selection of Irish Dances (Regal Records, G6975, 78 rpm)

== Bibliography ==
- Wyper's Melodeon Tutor for 19-Keys
