= John Kimmel (accordionist) =

German-American musician (1866–1942)

John J. Kimmel (13 December 1866 – 18 September 1942) was a German-American musician known for playing Irish, Scottish, and American music on the 1-row diatonic accordion (or melodeon). Though not Irish-American, but rather German-American (born in Brooklyn to German immigrants Margaretha Schmidt and John Kimmel), Kimmel's playing had an enduring effect on the playing of the Irish accordion.

Kimmel's career stretched roughly from 1904 to 1920, largely in New York City. He kept saloons, including one called The Accordion, and hired various early vaudeville performers including a young Mae West. His earliest recordings, done on Edison Wax Cylinder, were around 1906. Kimmel's works often appeared under the name Kimmble, and he was known to bill himself as the Irish Dutchman (cf. Deutsch). He made electrical recordings in 1928 and early 1929 for Victor and on Edison Diamond Discs.

== Discography ==
- Irish Boy March (Victor Records 1907)
- Medley of Irish Jigs (Emerson Records 1919)
- Medley of Irish Reels (Emerson Records 1919)
- John Kimmel - Virtuoso of the Irish Accordion (Smithsonian Institution Folkways Records, 1980)
- Accordion Solo - Medley of Reels No2 (Indestructible phonograph Cylinder record 1908)

=== Tributes ===
- John J. Kimmel, un héritage fabuleux (2010)

== See also ==
- Irish accordion in the United States
