= Mount Malindig =

Volcano in Marinduque, Philippines

- Malindik; Marlanga
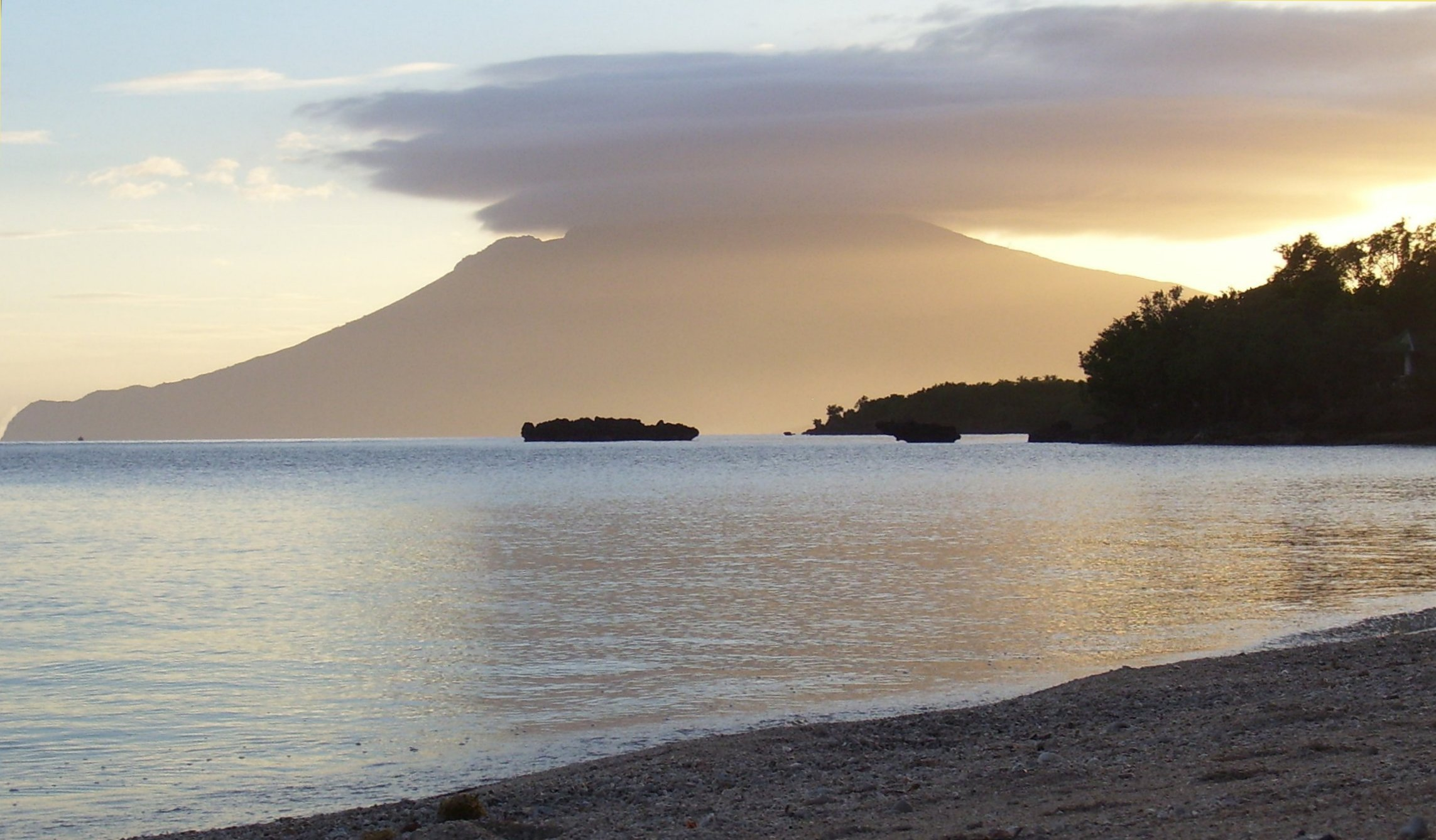
- Sunset over Mount Malindig

Highest point
- Elevation: 1,168 m (3,832 ft)
- Prominence: 1,168 m (3,832 ft)
- Listing: Potentially active volcano Ribu
- Coordinates: 13°14′30″N 122°00′45″E

Geography
- Location within Luzon Location within Philippines
- Country: Philippines
- Region: Mimaropa
- Province: Marinduque
- City/municipality: Buenavista; Torrijos

Geology
- Rock age: Unknown
- Mountain type: Stratovolcano
- Last eruption: Unknown

Climbing
- Easiest route: Hike

Mount Malindig (also known as Mount Malindik and Mount Marlanga) is a large potentially active stratovolcano on the island of Marinduque in the Philippines. It is the highest peak in the island having an elevation of 1,157 metres (3,796 ft) above sea level.

The name Marinduque itself may have been derived from Marindik or Malindik. This could be cognate of Visayan word "malindog".

The tale told by the people of Buenavista, the town that sits at the foot of Malindig, is that during the Spanish times, a Spanish soldier got lost. He came upon a girl sitting down sorting rice. He asked her what was the name of this place. She replied in Tagalog matindig (translation: "Let me stand up") so she could get a better view of the area. The Spaniard mistook the girl and thought the mountain was called Matindig, and unable to enunciate Tagalog, he called it Malindig.

Malindig is considered a potentially active volcano, in part because of the solfataric springs of Malbog. Its unique location, at the heart of Southern Tagalog, creates a panorama that encompasses Mindoro, Verde Island, and Southern Luzon all the way to Bicol and Burias Island. There is a military radio outpost at 900MASL.

The mountain is the largest on the island of Marinduque and the most popular climb and hike on the island for mountaineers and alike, known for its unique environmental biodiversity. It is the home of different species of wild orchids and other endemic wildlife. Due to its height above 1,000 metres (3,300 ft) above sea level, by law it has been identified as a protected area. The dormant volcano has three peaks, the Trek and climb to the peak is rated as easy to moderate. After passing the Radio Station base on the mountain, it has been known to be a mossy and closed canopy forest trek with regular foggy surroundings. It is also used by the Buenavista townfolks as a cattle grazing area.

During the American Period of rule over the Philippine Islands, Mount Malindig was named "Mount Marlanga" by the Americans. The name was later changed back to its original name of "Mount Malindig".

Mt. Malindig is around the vicinity of jurisdiction of barangays of Buenavista (Sihi, Bagacay, Bicas-Bicas, Yook, and Tungib-Lipata) and Torrijos (Cawayanan, Malibago and Dampulan).

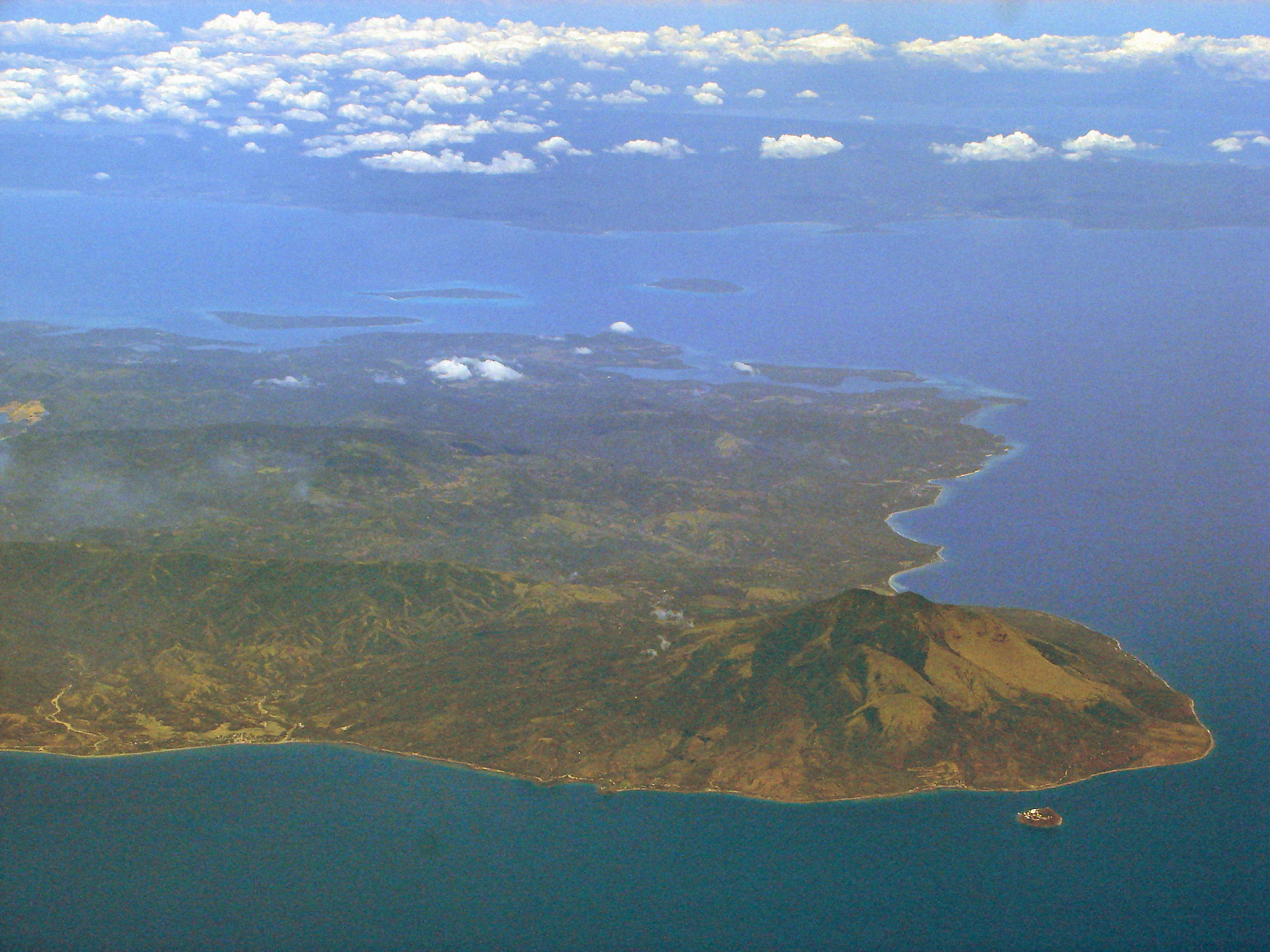
Aerial view of southern part of Marinduque with Mt. Malindig visible bottom right. In the foreground is Elephant Island, known as the Bellarocca Island.

== See also ==
- List of active volcanoes in the Philippines
- List of potentially active volcanoes in the Philippines
- List of inactive volcanoes in the Philippines
- Philippine Institute of Volcanology and Seismology
- Pacific ring of fire
