= Heligonka =

Eastern European diatonic button accordion

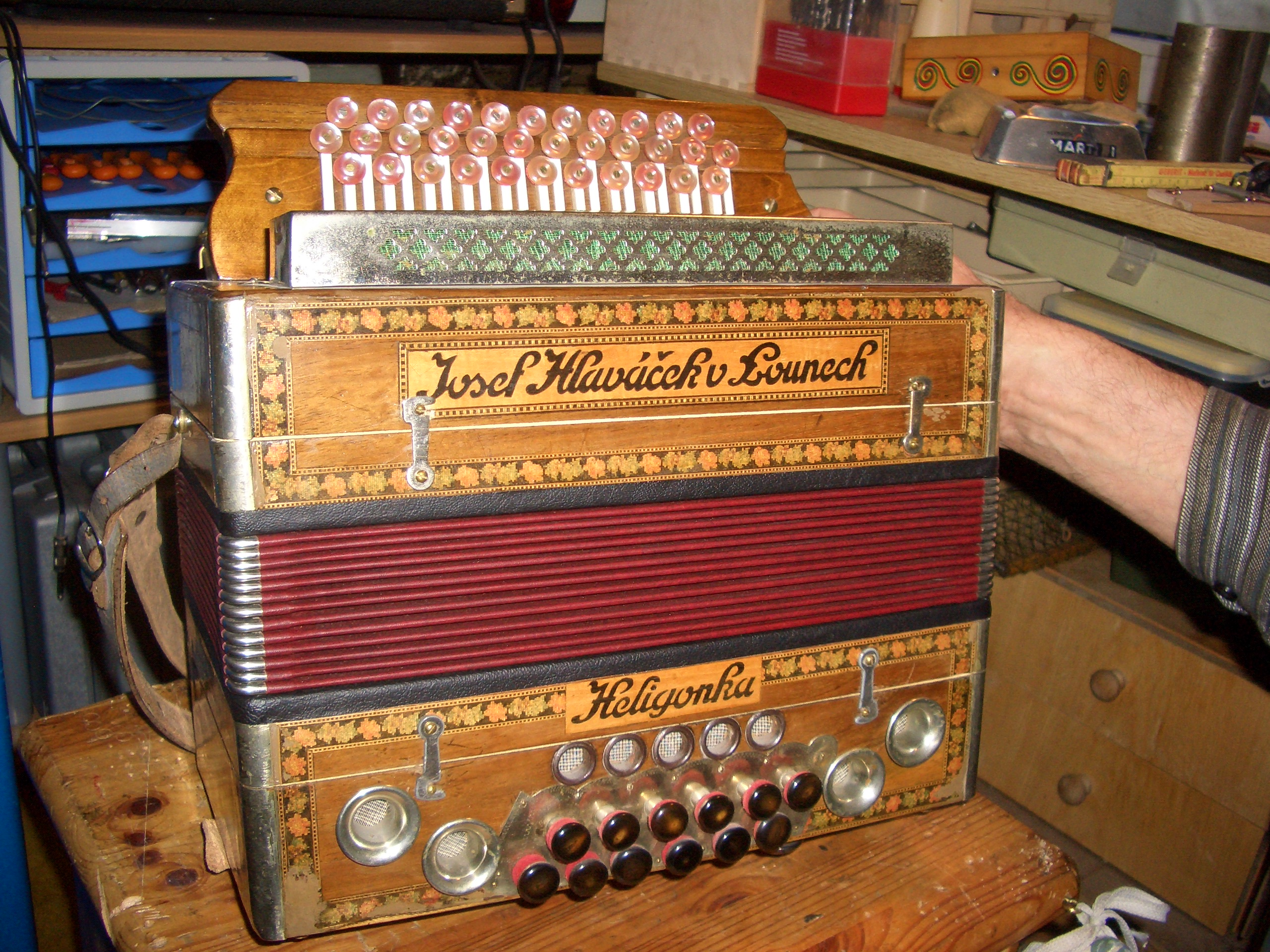
An example of heligonka

The heligonka or helikónka (in Slovak: heligónka) is a Czech, Slovak and a Polish Goral diatonic button accordion, similar to the Alpine Steirische Harmonika. Like the latter, the heligonka differs from other types of diatonic button accordions by having a supplemented and amplified bass part.

== See also ==
- Bandoneon
