= Diatonic button accordion =

Musical instrument of the free-reed aerophone family

Melodeon
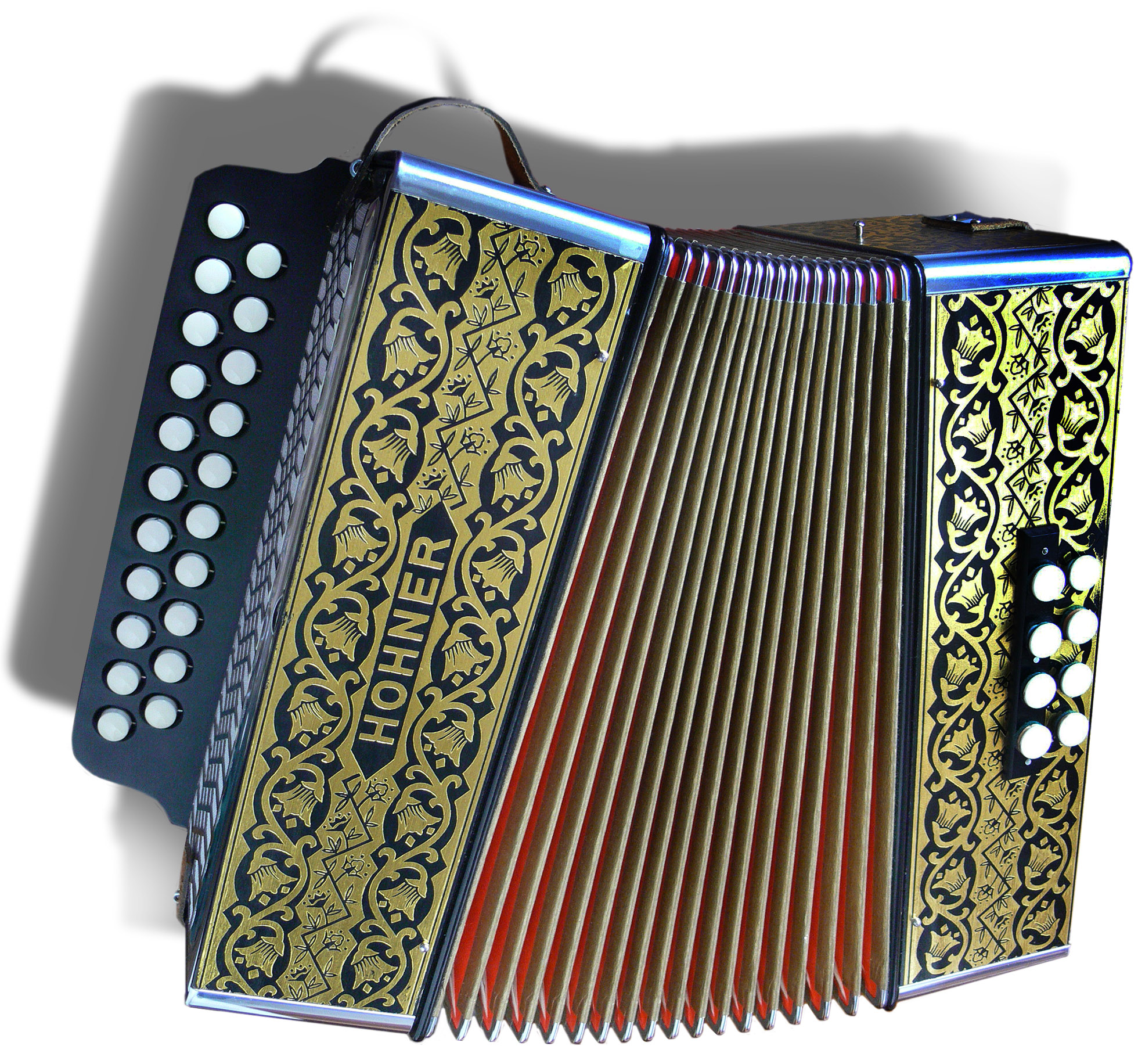
- Classification: Free-reed aerophone
- Hornbostel–Sachs classification: 412.132 (sets of free reeds)

Musicians
- List of accordionists

More articles or information
- Accordion, Chromatic button accordion, Bayan, Diatonic button accordion, Piano accordion, Stradella bass system, Free-bass system, Accordion reed ranks & switches

A melodeon or diatonic button accordion is a member of the free-reed aerophone family of musical instruments. It is a type of button accordion on which the melody-side keyboard contains one or more rows of buttons, with each row producing the notes of a single diatonic scale. The buttons on the bass-side keyboard are most commonly arranged in pairs, with one button of a pair sounding the fundamental of a chord and the other the corresponding major triad (or, sometimes, minor triad).

Diatonic button accordions are popular in many countries, and used mainly for playing popular music and traditional folk music, and modern offshoots of these genres.

== History ==
Like many modern instruments, the accordion was born of a fusion of inventions at the beginning of the 19th century. However the accordion's distant free reed ancestors were developed as early as 3000 BC in China and Laos, where instruments such as the sheng and the khene are still in use today. European travelers to Asia brought back descriptions of such instruments, and illustrations of them began appearing in the 1600 - 1700s. Combining the principle of the free reed with new technologies for machining and mass production that were emerging during the late 18th/early 19th centuries led to a ferment of invention that produced a great number of new instruments still in use today, such as the harmonium, the concertina, and the harmonica. Other instruments were less lucky and have left only rare examples found in museums--examples include the harmoniflute, the flutina, and the aeoline.

Because he filed the patent for it on May 6, 1829, Cyrill Demian, an Austrian of Armenian descent, is generally credited with having invented the accordion. The free reed instrument owes its name to the fact that each touch can produce a chord, that is, multiple tones in a harmonious combination. The instrument was designed to accompany singing with a simple harmony, but its basic principle, that of an instrument with bellows that were operated by the musician, which could produce chords at a touch, lent it to more varied uses.

The accordion was quickly copied and modified by other inventors and instrument makers: where Demian's invention played only chords for accompaniment, others transformed the right hand keyboard into one where each touch produced only a single note. Towards the middle of the 19th century, left-handed buttons for producing chords were also added. Louis Douce patented the unisonoric or double-action accordion in 1840, and Franz Walther made the first chromatic button accordion in 1850. It was not until the end of the 19th century that Paolo Soprani began mass-producing bisonoric accordions; these are the ancestors of today's piano (keyboard) accordions, which are chromatic rather than diatonic. The turn of the 20th century saw the appearance of the accordion with three rows of buttons, both chromatic and diatonic. Around this time, the industrial power of German manufacturers such as Hohner began to impose some standardization on the layout of the accordion keyboard, to wit: two rows of diatonic buttons separated by an ascending quarter.

== Nomenclature ==
Various terms for the diatonic button accordion are used in different parts of the English-speaking world.

- In Britain and Australia, the term melodeon (Scottish Gaelic: meileòidean or am bogsa) is commonly used, regardless of whether the instrument has one, two, or three rows of melody buttons.
- In Ireland, melodeon (Irish: mileoidean or an bosca) is reserved for instruments with a single row of melody buttons (a "one-row" instrument), while instruments with two or three rows are called button accordions (often simply accordions).
- In North America, both one-row and multi-row instruments are usually simply called accordions. (Historically, the term melodeon was applied to various 19th-century free-reed organs.) More specifically, in African American folk tradition, the one-row instrument, still common in zydeco and Cajun music, was called a windjammer.

To simplify matters and avoid ambiguity, in the remainder of this article the term diatonic button accordion, or DBA, will be used.

Folk song "The Adventure of the Sailor". Henrik Hinrikus is playing the Teppo type (Estonian) diatonic button accordion.

=== International terms ===
- The Basque terms are trikiti, trikitixa, soinu txikia or akordeoi diatonikoa.
- The Brazilian Portuguese terms are oito baixos (lit. eight basses), sanfona de oito baixos, pé de bode (lit. goat foot), acordeão diatônico or gaita-ponto.
- The Catalan term is acordió diatònic.
- The Dutch terms are trekharmonika and trekzak.
- The Estonian term is lõõtspill.
- The Finnish term is kaksirivinen haitari
- In France, the term accordéon diatonique (familiarly, diato) is used; mélodéon is sometimes used for one-row instruments.
- The usual German terms are Ziehharmonika, Handharmonika or Knopfakkordeon.
- The Swiss variant, with a double-action bass keyboard, is known in the local German as a Schwyzerörgeli.
- The Alpine Austrian variant, with amplified bass notes reminiscent of the helicon tuba, is known in German as a Steirische Harmonika.
- In Italy, a diatonic button accordion is a fisarmonica diatonica or organetto.
- In Limburgish it is known as trèkzak or kwetsjbuul / kwetsjbujel.
- The Lithuanian term is Armonika.
- In Mexico, as in Colombia, it is called acordeón diatónico or acordeón de botones.
- The Norwegian term is Torader (lit. two-row) or the general term Durspill (lit. major instrument), covering all number of rows.
- In Portugal (especially in the north) it is called concertina, not to be confused with the English word "concertina".
- The Russian term is garmon.
- The Czech term is heligonka.
- The Slovak term is heligónka.
- The Slovenian term is diatonična harmonika and more frequently frajtonar'ca
- The Swedish term is Durspel.
- In Argentina it is called a verdulera.

=== Glossary ===
The following definitions will assist understanding of this article.

- DBA: abbreviation for diatonic button accordion
- single-action: refers to an instrument on which each key or button produces two notes, as does bisonoric (a term recently coined on the model of the French bi-sonore and German wechseltönig)
- double-action: refers to an instrument on which each key or button produces a single note, as does unisonoric (recently coined as the counterpart of bisonoric)
- reversal: on a single-action instrument, a button or key which produces a note available elsewhere on the keyboard, but obtained by using the opposite bellows direction
- accidental: any note of the chromatic scale outside the diatonic scale of a DBA's "home" key

== Action ==
Most diatonic button accordions have a "single-action" (or bisonoric) keyboard, meaning that each button produces two notes: one when the bellows are pressed or pushed (closed) and another when the bellows are drawn or pulled (opened). In this respect, these instruments operate like a harmonica.

(In contrast, most other types of accordion, for example piano accordions and chromatic button accordions, are "double-action" – or unisonoric – because each key produces a single note regardless of bellows direction.)

Other single-action or bisonoric members of the free-reed family include the German concertina, the Anglo-German (or "Anglo") concertina, the bandoneon, the Chemnitzer concertina (see concertina) and the mouth organ (harmonica).

There are varieties of diatonic button accordion that are double-action, such as the garmon.

== Distribution of notes on the keyboard and range ==
Because each button produces two notes, the diatonic scale can be covered in four buttons on a melody row.

For example, on a melody row pitched in C, the notes of the lower full octave of the instrument's range are assigned to four buttons as follows:

First octave
Button	Push	Pull
1	C	D
2	E	F
3	G	A
4	C′	B

Note: the first button in the example above, numbered 1, is likely to be the 3rd or 4th button in a row on an instrument. Also note the pattern of push/pull to ascend the scale is broken on the return to the root note. This ensures that the root note in both octaves (in this example C and C') are in the same "push" direction. This also has the effect of keeping melody notes in an ideal direction for chords on the left hand.

When the bellows are pressed, every button produces a note from the major triad of the home key; in this case, the pattern CEG repeats itself throughout the keyboard. The remaining notes of the diatonic scale are produced when the bellows are drawn or pulled.

Since there are seven notes in the diatonic scale, and since each button produces two notes, the note pairings on the buttons change in each octave. In the second full octave of the instrument's range, E is paired with D (instead of with F in the first octave), and so on.

Second octave
Button	Push	Pull
5	E′	D′
6	G′	F′
7	C″	A′
8	E″	B′

Because the range of each row is typically restricted to two complete octaves (with a few notes above and below), the inconsistent note pairing from one octave to the next remains manageable.

For detailed diagrams of typical note layouts on various types of diatonic button accordion (DBA), see melodeon.net.

Hohner Club Button Diatonic (2 1/5 Row):

- The Hohner Club system is a unique style of diatonic button accordion. Unlike a standard melodeon, the Club system features a helper row and a special button called the Gleichton. The Gleichton: This is a specific button (usually the C note) that plays the same note on both the push and the pull of the bellows. This is a massive advantage, as it allows players to avoid awkward bellows changes and play much smoother melodies. Cross-Rowing: Because of the helper row, players can jump between rows to keep the bellows moving in one direction for longer phrases. see About_the_Club_System

== Available keys ==
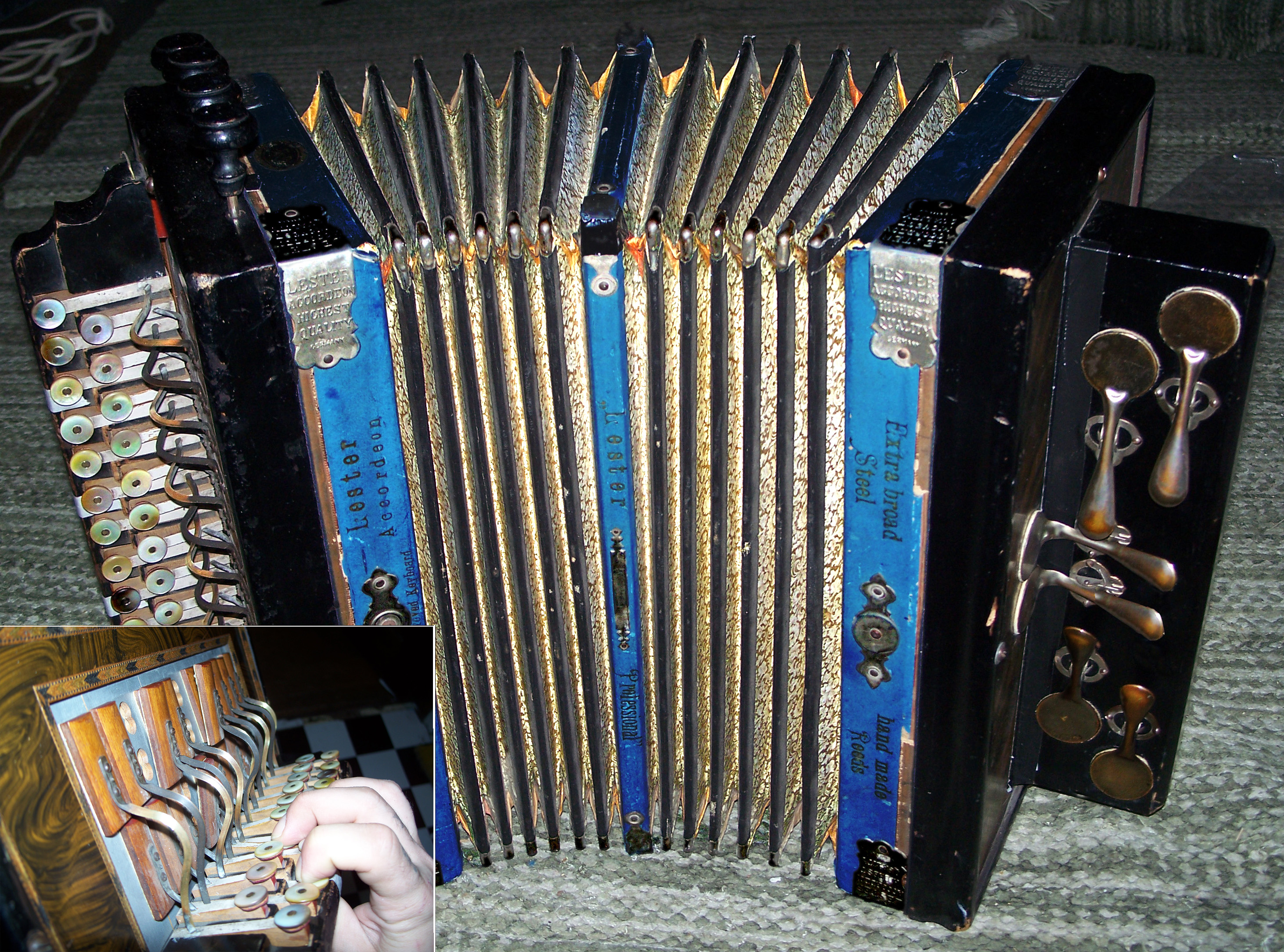
Diatonic button accordion (German make, early 20th century).

On a one-row DBA, music in a single major key and its relative minor can be played. For example, an instrument in D can play music in D major and B minor. However, the variety of music that can be played on a one-row instrument is wider than these facts might suggest: besides D major and B minor, our one-row instrument in D can play tunes in A Mixolydian and E Dorian, and tunes that use gapped scales, such as pentatonic tunes with a root of D, G or A.

== Multi-row systems ==
A one-row DBA has the advantages of being light and compact, but is by its nature limited to the notes of a single diatonic scale. Since the mid-to-late 19th century, instruments have been produced with more than one row in order to give players a greater choice of scales and tonalities.

Multi-row systems can be divided into two broad classes: "fourth-apart" systems and "semitone-apart" systems.

=== Fourth-apart systems ===
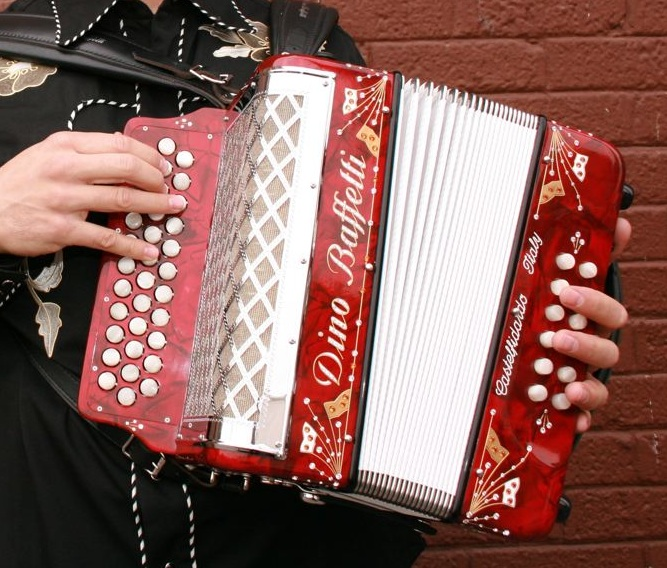
Three-row button accordion with 12 bass buttons

Fourth-apart systems are the most widespread form of multi-row DBA. Moving from the outside of the keyboard towards the inside, each row is pitched one-fourth higher than its neighbour. Conventionally, the outer keyboard row is specified first: for an example, on a G/C instrument the outer row is in the key of G, the inner row in C.

Commonly used in continental Europe are two-row systems in G/C and C/F and three-row systems in G/C/F, but many other permutations exist. In England, in the latter part of the 20th century, the D/G configuration became firmly established as the standard for interpreting traditional music of England, and particularly for the accompaniment of social and Morris dancing.

Three-row systems are also popular in Mexico and the United States (in Conjunto, Tejano, Zydeco and Cajun musics) and Colombia (in Vallenato and Folklor musics). Tunings include B♭/E♭/A♭, A/D/G, G/C/F, F/B♭/E♭ and E/A/D. The three-row fourth-apart configuration is known as the "international system."

Multi-row systems obviously extend the range of tonalities available. But since many notes in the additional rows are "reversals" (duplicate notes produced by the opposite bellows action), multi-row systems allow greater flexibility of phrasing, since the player can often choose whether or not to change bellows direction, or to harmonize with a particular chord, by choosing a note from one row or another. Styles of play have developed in which row-crossing allows the bass side to be used to maximum effect, and the number of changes of bellows direction greatly reduced.

==== Accidentals and reversals ====
Another feature designed to increase the flexibility of fourth-apart systems is the inclusion of notes that lie beyond the diatonic scales of each row, or "accidentals". These notes are most often operated by the buttons at the top of the keyboard (that is, closest to the player's chin), below the lowest notes of the scale.

Accidentals are sometimes placed on two extra buttons, or a shorter third row of four or more buttons, close to the bellows. The Club system developed by Hohner is a well-established example of this approach. Using the accidentals, and with the added modification of a Gleichton (unisonoric second-octave tonic in the centre of the middle row), this system allows players to obtain a fully chromatic scale – albeit in one direction only (draw).

Another use of such additional short rows, or half-rows, is to provide reversals (see above) to give the player greater flexibility.

=== Semitone-apart systems ===
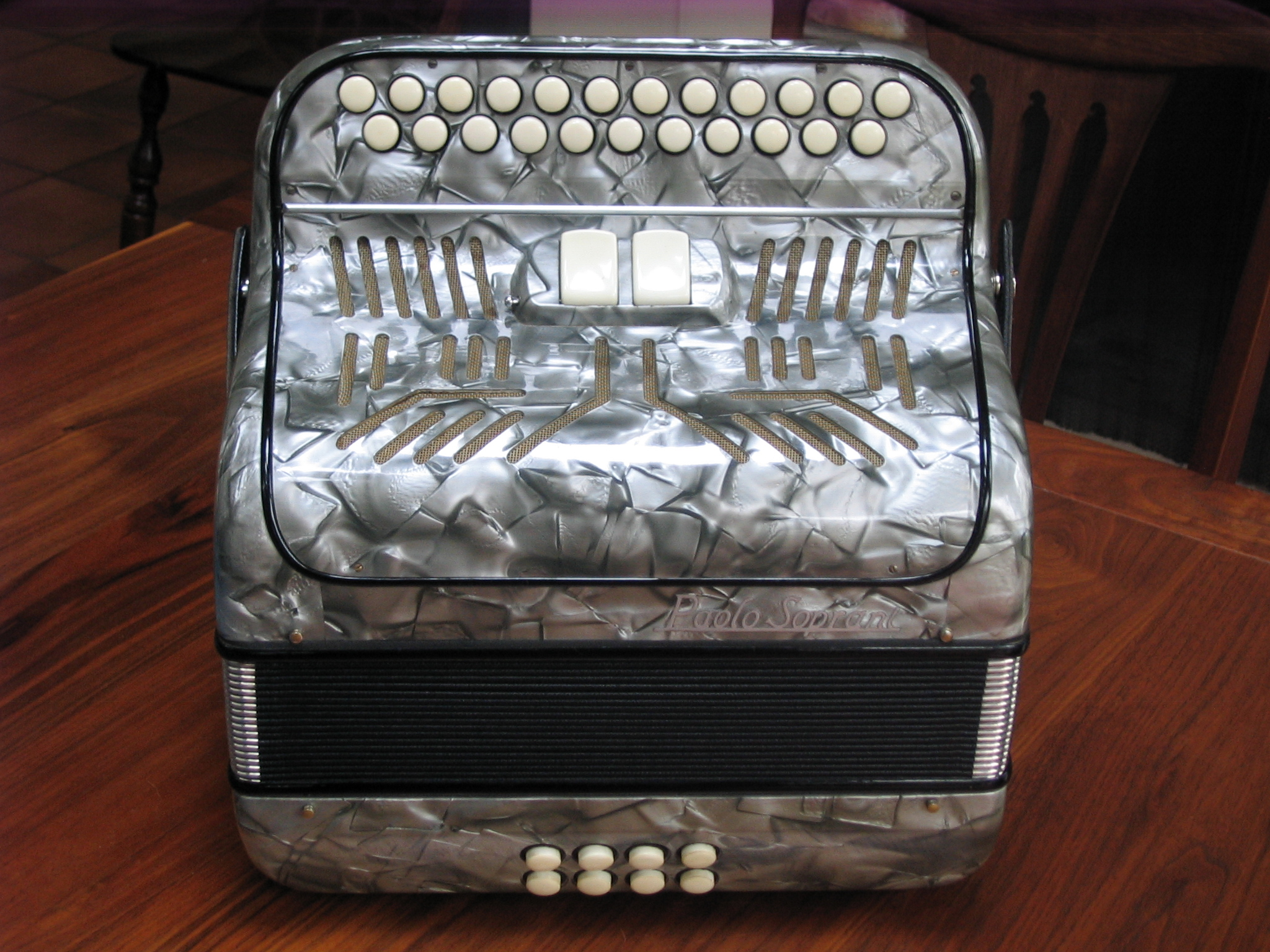
1950s two-row instrument in C♯/D by the Paolo Soprani company, of the type favoured by Irish musicians; grey celluloid finish.

In semitone-apart systems, moving in from the outside the keyboard, each row is pitched a semitone higher than its neighbour. This configuration makes all the notes of the chromatic scale available. As a result, such instruments could strictly be termed chromatic (rather than diatonic) instruments. In practice, however, the restrictions imposed by the single action and layout of the keyboard lead most players to keep to a fairly restricted range of keys (albeit a wider range than is practical on most fourth-apart systems).

The earliest semitone-apart system was C/C♯, and many variants have been used over the years, notably D/D♯ and G/G♯. However, since the mid-20th century two main systems have been in widespread use: the B/C system, used mainly for Irish and Scottish music, along with its larger cousin, the B/C/C♯ system (which is now little used outside Scotland); and the C♯/D system, somewhat less common, used mainly in Irish music. (Irish-American musicians of the mid-20th century used this system with the position of the rows reversed, i.e. D/C♯.)

== Bass systems ==
Traditionally, one-row instruments have two or four buttons on the bass side, two-row instruments have eight, and three-row instruments twelve. As mentioned above, bass buttons are conventionally arranged in bass-note/chord pairs.

Some modern players, particularly in France, are driving a trend towards instruments with more complex bass systems, with as many as 16 or even 18 buttons. Sometimes these more elaborate systems will diverge from the single-action principle, and may feature bass notes only instead of bass-chord pairs of buttons.

The B/C/C♯ system (also known as the British Chromatic System) used in Scotland provides a notable example of the use of a double-action bass side with a single-action melody side: these instruments frequently feature a full Stradella bass system as used on piano accordions and chromatic button accordions.

== Geographical variations on the DBA theme ==
Several distinct variations of the DBA have developed in different regions of the world. These include the Russian garmon, the Steirische Harmonika (Note: Bild:Schwarz-kaerntnerlkand.jpg Picture of Steirische Harmonika) or Slovenian-style accordion that is popular in Alpine regions of Europe, the Swiss Schwyzerörgeli and the Basque trikitixa; the last two combine single- and double-action (bisonoric and unisonoric) features. A common type of Italian organetto has a single melody row augmented with a very short half-row of between two and four buttons (often smaller in diameter than those on the main row) providing reversals only.

== Advantages and disadvantages of the diatonic system ==
DBAs have two main advantages when compared with chromatic accordions such as piano accordions and chromatic button accordions: 1) smaller size and lighter weight, and 2) the rhythmic effects inherent in the single ("push-pull") action.

The size and weight difference results from the nature of accordion reeds, which produce sound when air is moved through them in one direction only. In other words, for any key or button, two reeds are necessary: one to sound on the press, and one to sound on the draw. Because a double-action instrument sounds the same note on both press and draw, it needs two reeds for any given note in its range, where a single-action instrument—which sounds a different note on press and draw—requires only one. Any double-action instrument thus requires roughly twice as many reeds as an equivalent single-action instrument, making it larger and considerably heavier. (Another way to understand this difference is to consider the fact that a double-action instrument generally requires twice as many keys or buttons to produce a range of notes as a single-action instrument: for example, a piano accordion requires 8 keys (16 reeds) to sound a diatonic scale from C to C', where a DBA pitched in C requires 4 buttons (8 reeds) to produce the same notes.) This size and weight advantage is somewhat eroded in more complex, multi-row variants of the DBA, alluded to below.

The rhythmic effects inherent in the push-pull action are very well suited to the lively rhythms of dance music, and traditional dance music in particular. (On multi-row fourth-apart instruments, players can to some extent counter the natural push-pull effect with a row-crossing playing style that "smooths out" the musical phrasing; on semitone-apart systems, depending on the key of the piece being played, players may be obliged to adopt a smoother style.) Additionally, the close-togetherness of the notes on a DBA allow some tunes (particularly the quick folkdances and tunes written for the instrument) to be played with more ease and speed than on the more spread-out keyboards of chromatic- and piano-accordions. For example, playing an Irish reel might be easier on a B/C system diatonic than on a piano-accordion, and a Swiss Schottisch or Ländler might be easier to play on a Schwyzerörgeli than on a piano or even a chromatic due to the chordal/arpeggio phrases that fall naturally on the buttons that are arranged thus.

The main disadvantage of the diatonic system is that playing in a wide range of keys is impractical. Attempts to overcome this limitation, for example by adding extra rows and more complicated bass systems, invariably add extra bulk and weight, thereby compromising an advantage in striving to overcome a disadvantage. Extreme examples are 18-bass three-row instruments of the type favoured by some French musicians, and B/C/C♯ accordions with 120-button Stradella basses: the size and weight of both these types can be greater than medium-sized piano or chromatic accordions.

== Notable players ==
- Basque Country: Kepa Junkera
- Belgium: Wilfrid Moonen, Rik Boone, Louis Spagna, Toon Van Mierlo, Pascale Rubens
- Brazil: Renato Borghetti, Gilberto Monteiro
- Colombia: Israel Romero (Vallenato), Aniceto Molina (Cumbia), Alfredo Gutiérrez (Vallenato), Alejo Durán (Vallenato), Emiliano Zuleta (Vallenato), Colacho Mendoza (Vallenato), Lisandro Meza (Porro and Cumbia), Antonio Rivas (Vallenato).
- Dominican Republic: Krency Garcia (Merengue Tipico) Tatico Henriquez (Merengue Tipico)
- England: Jack Hogsden, Hazel Askew, Andy Cutting, Tim Edey, John Kirkpatrick, Brian Peters, Saul Rose, John Spiers, Rod Stradling, John Tams, Tim van Eyken, Will Hampson, Cohen Braithwaite-Kilcoyne, Martin Ellison, Paul Young, Will Pound, Frankie Insley, Archie Churchill-Moss, Max Thomas of Skinny Lister
- Ireland: Joe Burke, Bobby Gardiner, Joe Cooley, Tony MacMahon, James Keane, Joe Derrane, Jackie Daly, Máirtín O'Connor, Sharon Shannon, Johnny O'Leary, Johnny Connolly
- Italy: Denis Novato, Riccardo Tesi, Ambrogio Sparagna, Massimiliano Morabito, Donatello Pisanello.
- Mexico: Ramón Ayala (Norteño),
- Netherlands: Frans Tromp
- Newfoundland: Harry Hibbs, Minnie White, Frank Maher
- Norway: Rannveig Djønne, Tom Willy Rustad
- Scotland: Peter Wyper, Jimmy Shand, Will Starr, Fergie MacDonald
- Slovenia: Lojze Slak
- USA: John Kimmel, Joe Derrane, Huddie Ledbetter, Marc Savoy (Louisiana Cajun), J Boozoo Chavis (Louisiana zydeco), Flaco Jimenez (conjunto) Mojo of Mojo & The Bayou Gypsies (zydeco, Cajun), Willi Carlisle, David Hidalgo, Jeffery Broussard, Geno Delafose, John Delafose, Joe Falcón, Keith Frank, Santiago Jiménez Jr., Cedric Watson

== Repertoire ==
=== Classical ===
- Dances from a New England Album, 1856 for orchestra by William Bergsma includes parts for melodeon (movements I–III) and harmonium (movement IV).

== See also ==
- Accordion
- Bandoneon
- Cajun accordion
- Chromatic button accordion
- Concertina
- Piano accordion
- Ralé-poussé
