= Lilting =

Form of traditional singing common in areas of Ireland, Scotland and the Isle of Man

Lilting is a form of traditional singing common in the Goidelic speaking areas of Ireland, Scotland and the Isle of Man, though singing styles like it occur in many other countries. It goes under many names, and is sometimes referred to as diddling (generally in England and Scotland), mouth music, jigging, chin music or cheek music, puirt à beul or canntaireachd in Scottish Gaelic, or portaireacht bhéil (port a'bhéil, 'mouth-singing') in Irish. The syllables sung do not require any one-to-one corresponding note, and in this way it resembles scat singing, and is distinguished from the singing of sol-fa or sargam.

== Features ==
Lilting often accompanies dancing. Features such as rhythm and tone dominate in lilting and in the case of Irish lilting in particular, is intended to evoke the characteristic 'lilt' of traditional Irish music and specific instruments such as the Celtic harp. The lyrics thus are often meaningless or nonsensical.

== History ==
The origins of lilting are unclear. It might have resulted in part from the unavailability of instruments, whether because they were seen as too expensive or were banned. However, similar use of non-lexical syllables also feature in various traditional musical styles worldwide, including tralling or trallning in Sweden and Norway. The history of lilting may be obscured in part because lilting is a largely oral tradition and has not been referred to by consistent names over time.

According to modern folk musician Rowan Piggott, there is an unverified legend about lilting that claims it originates from the Cromwellian conquest of Ireland from 1649–1653 where bans on musical instruments required old songs to be passed down orally via singing or lilting.

At the turn of the 20th century lilting found increased popularity in local dance events known as "house dances" and "crossroads dances". Beginning the mid-1900s, lilting was increasingly performed as a recital or stand alone performance instead of accompaniment for dancing. Recital lilting is currently one of the multiple events performed at the annual traditional Irish musical festival, Fleadh Cheoil, held by the non-profit organization Comhaltas Ceoltóirí Éireann (CCE).

== Notable lilters ==
- Jimmy Ward
- Paddy Tunney
- Bobby Gardiner
- Len Graham
- Christine Primrose
- Karen Matheson and Mary Ann Kennedy demonstrate lilting on a 2005 BBC television series, The Highland Sessions, filmed in Killiecrankie, Perthshire
- Dolores O'Riordan, singer of Irish rock band The Cranberries
- Siobhan Owen, Welsh-born Australian celtic and classical singer, harpist
- Kevin Conneff, of The Chieftains

== See also ==
- List of All-Ireland lilting champions
- List of traditional Irish singers
- Sean-nós singing, unaccompanied Irish traditional singing
- Puirt à beul, Scottish lilting
- Waulking song, unaccompanied Scottish traditional singing while fulling cloth
- Yodeling
