= Bobby Gardiner =

Irish accordionist and lilter (born 1939)

- Born: Patrick Francis Gardiner; 16 June 1939 (age 87); Aughdara, County Clare, Ireland
- Genres: Traditional Irish music Folk; World music
- Occupation: Accordion Player
- Years active: ~1954–present

Bobby Gardiner (born 1939) is an Irish accordionist and lilter. He was recruited by Micheal O'Suilleabhain to the Music Department in University College Cork in the 1980s and was awarded an honorary master's degree by the university in 2023.

== Biography ==
Bobby Gardiner was born in Aughdarra, Lisdoonvarna, the Burren area of County Clare. His mother, Dilly, played a German two- row concertina and from her he learned his first tune – the fling What the devil ails you? His brother introduced him to a new Hohner two-row button accordion and after that, Bobby bought a grey Paolo Soprani accordion.

At the age of 15, he was asked to join the Kilfenora Céilí Band. In 1957 he joined Malachy Sweeney's Céilí Band from Armagh and traveled throughout Ireland as a professional musician.

In 1960, Bobby followed his brother Mike and sister Mary to New Haven, Connecticut. During the day he worked as a mechanic on the New York Railway while playing for dances with the likes of Paddy Killoran, Joe Cooley, Ed Reavy and Joe Derrane as well as doing some session work for Colonial Records. His solo recording career began when Justus O'Byrne De Witt heard him on the Jack Wade Ceili Band record and contacted him to record his first LP, "Memories of Clare" which was one of the first solo LPs by an Irish button accordion player. He also recorded with Paddy Killoran. The LP sold so well that he was asked back to do more recordings.

In 1963 Bobby was drafted into the US Army and was stationed at Fort Dix in New Jersey. On his weekends off, he would visit the Catskill Mountains in New York where he played with renowned musicians such as Joe Cooley, Sean McGlynn and Andy McGann.

He got married in Dublin on St. Patrick's Day, 17 March 1969, to Ann Kearney, a Tipperary singer. The newlyweds returned to America where their first daughter, Kelley was born. A year later they returnes to Ireland and they settled in Burncourt, a small village in south Tipperary near the town of Cahir, where they had two more daughters, Fiodhna and Lynda. All his children are accomplished musicians, carrying on the Irish music tradition, playing melodeon, whistles and concertina. In January 2009, Fiodhna in her band Inis Oirr, entertained the Irish president Mary McAleese in the Emirates Palace Hotel, Abu Dhabi, UAE.

Over the years Gardiner proceeded to make further recordings, most notably: "The Master's Choice" and "The Clare Shout". Gardiner has also traveled extensively with Comhaltas Ceoltóirí Éireann and is a member of the Brú Ború Troupe in Cashel, County Tipperary. They have also toured in China as well as Japan, Spain, Canada and the US.

He is an active accordion teacher in Tipperary, Waterford and Limerick. He was recruited by the pianist Micheal O'Suilleabhain to the Music Department in University College Cork where he has been teaching traditional music since the 1980s. Some of his past students include Ciarán Ó Gealbháin and Benny McCarthy both of whom were part of Danú.

== Playing style ==
Stylistically, Gardiner plays what is termed a wet tuned accordion. Other Irish proponents of wet tuning include: Joe Burke, Tony McMahon, Martin Connolly and Séamus Begley and as such Gardiner was one of the first Irish accordionist to master the art of the B/C accordion tuning. Bobby Gardiner's style of playing is particularly suited to Irish dancing because of his impeccable rhythm, creativity and his use of the single-button triplet, which has become his hallmark.

In "The Clare Shout" Bobby focuses on the one-row melodeon and the traditional art form of lilting, or mouth music. In the past, lilting was used to accompany dancers when instruments were unavailable.

== Discography ==
Albums

Albums by Bobby Gardiner
Year	Artist	Title	Label	Notes
1958	Bobby Gardiner	Bobby Gardiner – Accordion	Clare Records	New York.
1962	Bobby Gardiner	Memories of Clare	Gael label	Reissued 1995 on Copley Irish Records. Musical analysis of contents at irishtune.info.
1970	Bobby Gardiner, Felix Dolan	Traditional Irish Music	Clare Records	
1979	Bobby Gardiner	Bobby Gardiner at Home	Releases Records	
1982	Bobby Gardiner	The Best of Bobby Gardiner	CCE	
1989	Bobby Gardiner	The Master's Choice	Ossian	Musical analysis of contents at irishtune.info.
1995	Bobby Gardiner, Mel Mercier, Ann Gardiner, Lynda Gardiner	The Clare Shout	Own label	Lilting and melodeon. A number of different boxes are used on the recording including: a Salterelle, a Castagnari, A Hohner, and a very rare Ludwig and Hohner Vienna Accordion. Musical analysis of contents at irishtune.info.
2010	Bobby Gardiner	The High Level	Own label	Musical analysis of contents at irishtune.info.

Featured on

Bobby Gardiner has featured on
Year	Artist	Title	Label	Notes
1962	Paddy Killoran, Bobby Gardiner			
	Bobby Gardiner	Rogha Órdha 50		Comhaltas's Golden Jubilee compilation album.
	Bobby Gardiner	The Floating BowHand DVD.		Musical documentary on Jim McKillop
	Bobby Gardiner	ClearAED		
	Bobby Gardiner	Come West Along the Road 2		RTÉ production
	Bobby Gardiner	The Best of Irish Accordion		2-CD Set
	Bobby Gardiner	The Best of Irish Céilí		2-CD Set
