= Steirische Harmonika =

Musical instrument popular in alpine folk music

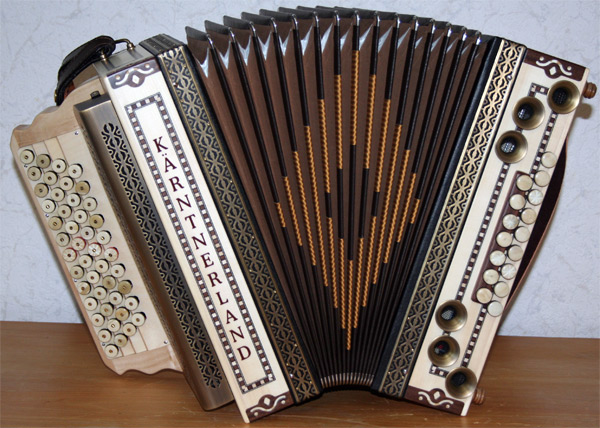
A Steirische Harmonika

The Steirische Harmonika (Austrian German pronunciation: [ˈʃtaɪrɪʃɛ harˈmoːnika]) is a type of bisonoric diatonic button accordion important to the alpine folk music of Croatia (Hrvatsko zagorje), Slovenia, the Czech Republic, Austria, the German state of Bavaria, and the Italian South Tyrol. The Steirische Harmonika is distinguished from other diatonic button accordions by its typically richer bass notes, and by the presence of one key per scale row that has the same tone on both compression and expansion of the bellows, called a Gleichton. The bass notes earn the distinction Helikonbässe because they use bigger reeds with duralumin reed frames and a special chamber construction that amplifies its bass tones to give it a loud sound reminiscent of a Helicon tuba.

The name "Steirische Harmonika" literally translates from German as Styrian accordion; the use of the adjective steirische stems from the Viennese dialect. Steirische refers to the state of Steiermark (Styria), or Štajerska in Slovenian. This type of harmonica originated in Styria in the city of Slovenj Gradec (Windischgraz in german), after the invention of the helikon bass reed by Franz Lubas in 1878.

== Description ==
The Steirische Harmonika has melody side on the right, and a bass side on the left. On the melody side, there are three to five rows of buttons where each row has its own key. Accordions with five rows are used mostly in Austria. On the compression of the bellows, the buttons of one row play the tones from the key's tonic, and on the expansion of the bellows, the buttons of one row play tones from the key's dominant seventh. The button which plays the same tone on both the expansion and compression of the bellows is called the Gleichton, ("same-tone" in German). Often melodies require playing buttons from different rows because they cannot be decomposed into tones from the tonic and dominant seventh of a given key. Originally, there were two systems for the diatonic Steirische, the Slovenian System, which had no Gleichton and a flat keyboard, and the German or Austrian System with Gleichton and a stepped keyboard. The Slovenian System is no longer much used; even the Slovenian players today play the German or Austrian System.

There is also a chromatic version of the Steirische, with the same treble system as the regular chromatic accordion. This is referred to as a "Semi-chromatic" (polkromatična harmonika), a "Half-chromatic", or a "12-bass chromatic". The treble side therefore sounds the same note in either bellows direction. The bass system does however sound different notes depending on bellows direction, but arranged so that all 12 notes of the scale can be played. This type of chromatic Steirische was popularized in America by Matt Hoyer, Johnny Pecon, and Lou Trebar.

For each row on the right hand melody side, there are two associated buttons on the outer row of the bass side: one for the root, and one for the harmony. On compression, they play the tonic, and on expansion, the dominant. The function of the inner row, however, varies by manufacturer.

Technical Steirische Accordion playing is very advanced especially in Bavaria, Austria and Slovenia.

== Weltmeister awards on Steirische Harmonika ==
- 1987 Zoran Lupinc
- 1996 Toni Bartl
- 1997 Jakob Bergmann
- 1999 Robert Goter
- 2007 Markus Oberleitner
- 2009 Nejc Pačnik
- 2015 Nejc Pačnik

== Other awards ==
2016: Austrian Recognition Award for Folk culture and cultural initiatives for Ernst Spirk, musician, composer, arranger, folk music teacher, founder of a number of folk music ensembles,

== Other well-known artists ==
- Slovenia: Lojze Slak, Franc Mihelič, Tine Lesjak, Ottavio Brajko, Max Kumer, Niko Zajc
- Austria: Erwin Aschenwald, Erwin Aschenwald Jr., Erich Moser, Claudia Hinker
- Italy: Herbert Pixner
- USA: Matt Hoyer, Joe Mlakar, Louis Špehek, Joe Kušar, Bobby Zgonc, Al Meixner, Alex Meixner, Joe Smiell.
- Chromatic Steirische artists in the USA: Matt Hoyer, Johnny Pecon, Lou Trebar, Benzy Rathbone, Rob Deblander, Darryl Valencic, Fred Kuhar

== Notation ==
Notes on the Steirische Harmonika are laid out to make it easy to play music with the tonality characteristic of alpine folk music, but make it difficult to play according to modern musical notation.

To help aid playing the Steirische Harmonika, the Verlag Helbling publishers patented in 1916 a tablature, which no longer is in current use. It has come to be replaced by a notation called Griffschrift, which was invented by a music teacher from Bärnbach in Styria named Max Rosenzopf. The notation appears similar to modern notation but maps tones to positions on the staff differently. In 1975 Rosenzopf founded the Verlag Preissler publishing company and printed the first book using the Griffschrift to teach reading notes. Now all notes for the Steirische Harmonika are printed using this notation.

There is also a related instrument in Czechia, Slovakia and southern Poland folklore called the heligonka harmonika.

== See also ==
- Heligonka
