= Luzon Datum of 1911 =

Geodetic center monument of the Philippines

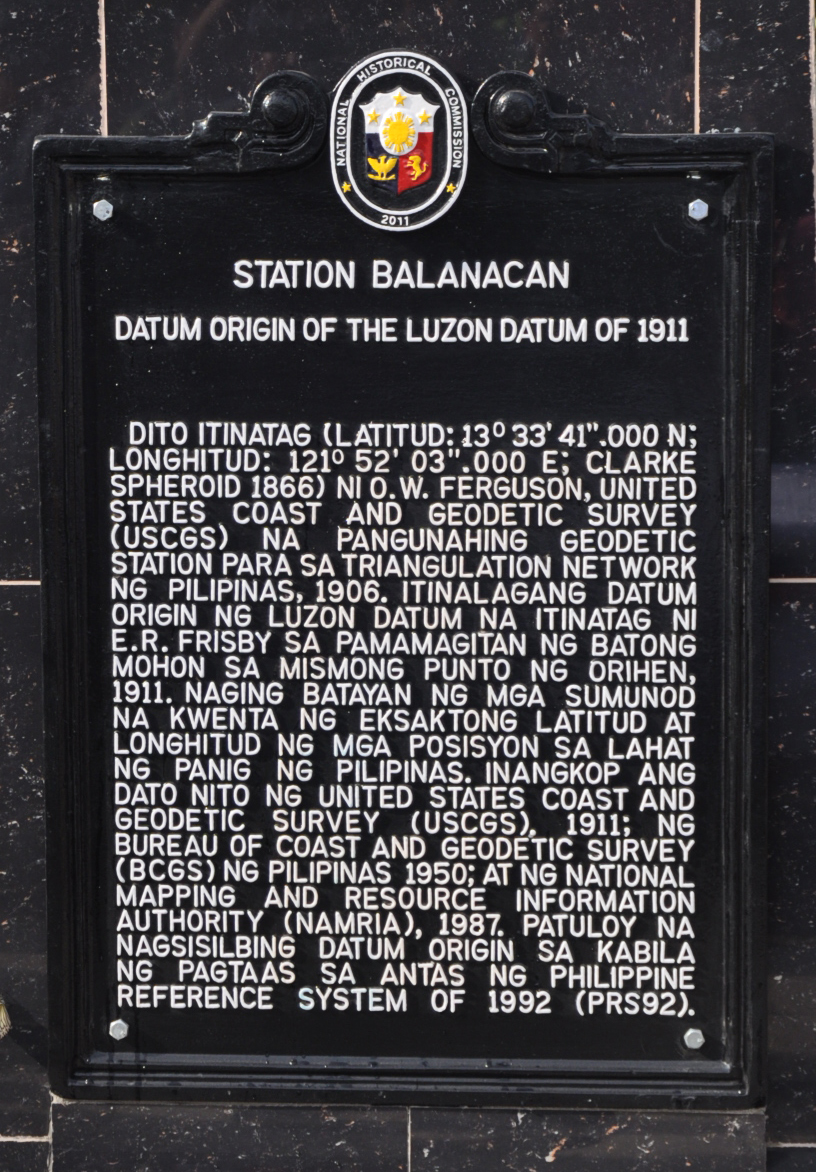
Station Balanacan national historical marker

The Luzon Datum of 1911 was the base for the first modern survey of the Philippine Islands. The execution of the triangulation of the Philippine Islands extended over almost as long a time as the history of the American administration in the Philippines. The plan of the government to survey the islands began in March 1900 when a United States Coast and Geodetic Survey (USCGS) officer was sent to Manila with instructions to prepare a report on the existing cartographic conditions in the Philippines and to obtain all information necessary for the execution of geodetic, hydrographic, and topographic surveys in the country.

After the establishment of the sub-office known as the Manila Field Station, which was housed in the old Intendencia Building in the Walled City of Intramuros, the USCGS commenced fieldwork in the Philippine Islands in January 1901. At that time, an insurrection was in progress and the Islands were under military law. The field surveys were conducted under a joint agreement between the USCGS and the Insular Government. From 1901 to 1911, the USCGS established several triangulation networks across the country which had different origins. In 1911, these different networks on different datums and with different origins were consolidated into one nationwide network and the Luzon Datum was established with triangulation station Balanacan as its datum origin. The Luzon Datum became the primary geodetic reference of all surveys in the Philippines.
