= Joe Derrane =

American musician (1930–2016)

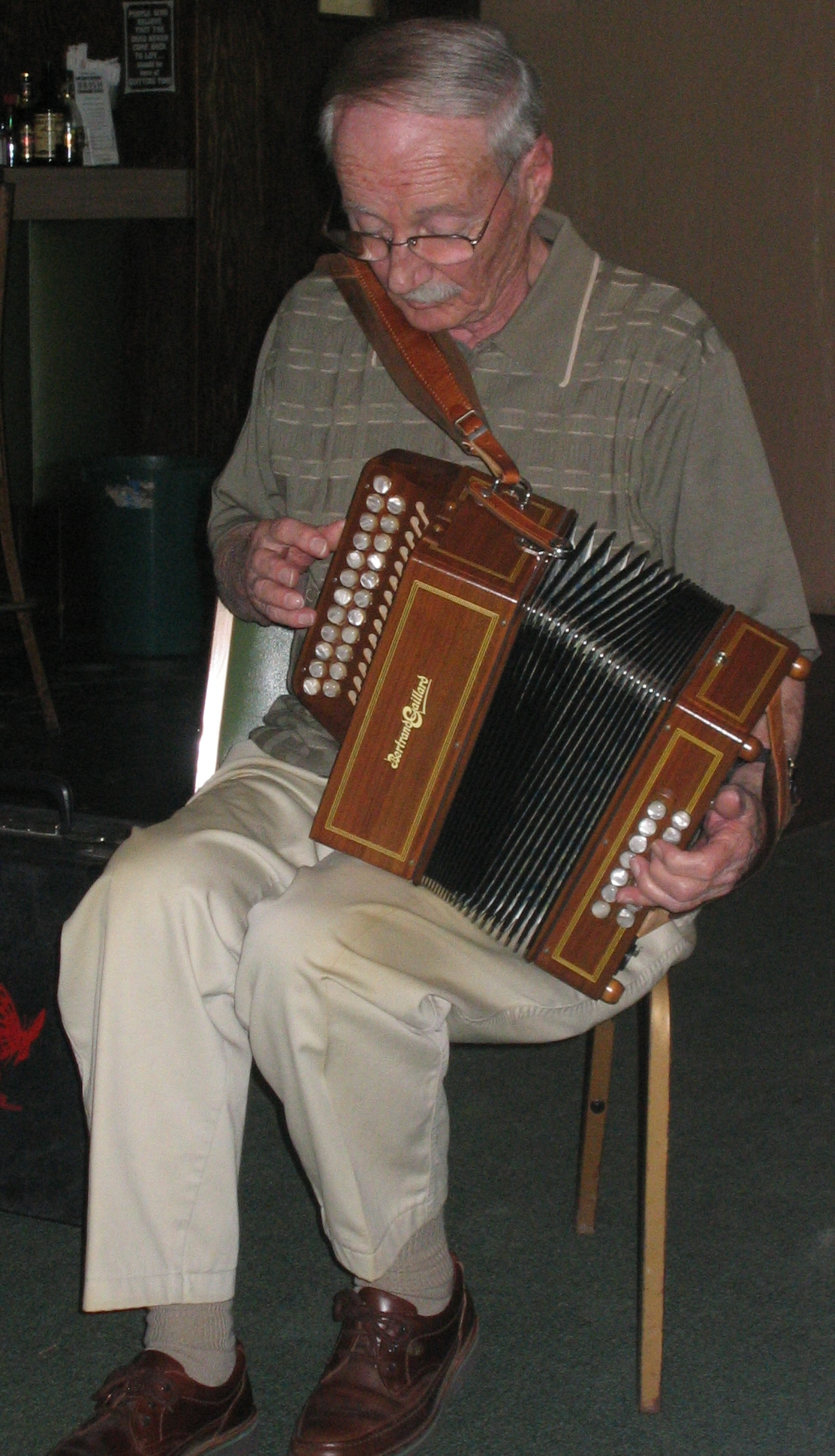
- Derrane in 2005

Background information
- Born: March 16, 1930; Boston, Massachusetts, U.S.
- Died: July 22, 2016 (age 86) Brockton, Massachusetts, U.S.
- Genres: Irish
- Occupation: Musician
- Instrument: Button accordion
- Years active: 1947–2011

Joe Derrane (March 16, 1930 – July 22, 2016) was an Irish-American button accordion player, known for re-popularizing the D/C# system diatonic button accordion.

== Life ==
Derrane was born in Boston, Massachusetts, to Irish immigrant parents. His father played the accordion and his mother the fiddle. At the age of 10, Derrane began playing a one-row diatonic button accordion or melodeon, taking lessons with Jerry O'Brien, an immigrant from Kinsale, County Cork, Ireland. By the age of 14 Derrane was performing at the thriving "kitchen rackets" (house parties) on the Boston Irish scene. He soon upgraded to a 2-row D/C# accordion (the standard "American Irish" tuning of the time), and by the age of 17 was a leading musician in the Irish dancehalls on Dudley Street, Roxbury. This popularity in turn brought him radio exposure. In 1947–48 he recorded eight 78 rpm singles (16 sides) of Irish dance tunes. These recordings were widely admired for Derrane's vigorous, accurate and highly ornamented playing.

By the late 1950s the Irish dancehalls in Roxbury were in terminal decline. Derrane was married with children and needed to continue supplementing his income through music. He switched to piano accordion and formed a band to play for weddings and similar engagements, moving away from traditional Irish music and instead playing popular music as well as Italian and Jewish traditional tunes. By the mid-1970s musical tastes had changed once more and Derrane again switched instruments, moving to electronic keyboards. He retired from music in 1990.

In 1993, however, Rego Records reissued the sixteen 78 rpm cuts on CD (Irish Accordion). The recordings again generated considerable interest, but many assumed that the man who had made them in the late 1940s had died. On learning from Boston resident fiddler Seamus Connolly that Joe Derrane was still alive, Earle Hitchner, called "arguably the pre-eminent Celtic critic in this country" by The Boston Globe, contacted him in the early fall of 1993, and Derrane privately began playing the button accordion again. Shortly thereafter, at the strong urging of Hitchner, Washington, D.C., Irish Folk Festival artistic director Mike Denney invited Derrane to perform in the May 1994 festival at Wolf Trap in Vienna, Virginia. Derrane practiced intensively in preparation for what he thought would be the last appearance of his life, what he described as his "last hurrah." But his virtuosic performances (accompanied by Felix Dolan on piano) at Wolf Trap were greeted with overwhelming enthusiasm and acclaim, and soon Derrane embarked on a second career as a button accordionist.

Since 1994 Joe Derrane has recorded two solo albums and four collaborations with prestigious players. He has appeared on radio and television many times, including The Pure Drop on Irish TV (RTÉ). He was the subject of a documentary by Frank Ferrel, As Played By Joe Derrane, and of another broadcast by Irish-language station TG4 as part of its Sé mo laoch series. He has toured Canada, Switzerland and the Netherlands, and appeared with The Chieftains at Boston Symphony Hall. In 1998 Derrane was inducted into the Hall of Fame of Comhaltas Ceoltóirí Éireann (North American Province) for his contribution to Irish traditional music. In 2004 the National Endowment for the Arts awarded him a National Heritage Fellowship, which is the United States' highest honor in the folk and traditional arts. In 2006 he appeared at the National Folk Festival (USA).

Joe Derrane died on July 22, 2016, in Brockton, Massachusetts, at the age of 86.

== Discography ==
Solo albums

- Irish Accordion (1993, reissued 1995) (singles from the 1940s)
- Give Us Another (1995)
  - Track listing at irishtune.info
- The Tie That Binds (1998)
  - Track listing at irishtune.info
- Grove Lane (2010)
  - Track listing at irishtune.info

Joe Derrane and Carl Hession.

- Return To Inis Mor (1996)
  - Track listing at irishtune.info

Joe Derrane, Frankie Gavin and Brian McGrath.

- Ireland's Harvest (2002)

Joe Derrane and Jerry O'Brien.

- Irish Accordion Masters (1996)
  - Track listing at irishtune.info

Joe Derrane, Séamus Connolly and John McGann.

- The Boston Edge (2004)

Joe Derrane and John McGann

- The Man behind The Box (2005)

Anthology – Tulla Ceili Band, Joe Derrane, Tom Doherty et al.

- Baby Let Me Squeeze Your Box (2007)

Anthology – Deanta, Capercaillie, Altan, Joe Derrane, Kornog, Eileen Ivers, Silly Wizard et al.

- Green Linnet Records: 25 Years of Celtic Music (2006)
