= 2025 Philippine local elections in Mimaropa =

- May 12, 2025
- Gubernatorial elections
- 5 provincial governors and 1 city mayor
| Party | Seats | +/– |
|---|---|---|
| PFP | 2 | New |
| GSM | 1 | New |
| Liberal | 1 | +1 |
| PDP–Laban | 1 | −3 |
| PPPL | 1 | 0 |
This lists parties that won seats. See the complete results below.
- Vice gubernatorial elections
- 5 provincial vice governors and 1 city vice mayor
| Party | Seats | +/– |
|---|---|---|
| PFP | 2 | New |
| Liberal | 1 | +1 |
| MBS | 1 | +1 |
| PPPL | 1 | 0 |
| Independent | 1 | +1 |
This lists parties that won seats. See the complete results below.
- Provincial Board elections
- 50 provincial board members and 10 city councilors
| Party | Seats | +/– |
|---|---|---|
| PFP | 29 | +28 |
| PPPL | 9 | +6 |
| GSM | 5 | New |
| Nacionalista | 4 | −2 |
| Lakas | 3 | +1 |
| Liberal | 3 | −1 |
| MBS | 2 | −3 |
| PDP–Laban | 1 | −23 |
| PRP | 1 | 0 |
| Independent | 3 | +1 |
This lists parties that won seats. See the complete results below.

The 2025 Philippine local elections in Mimaropa were held on May 12, 2025.

== Summary ==
=== Governors ===
| Province/city | Incumbent | Incumbent's party | Winner | Winner's party | Winning margin |
|---|---|---|---|---|---|
| Marinduque | Presbitero Velasco Jr. | PFP | Mel Go | PDP–Laban | 0.30% |
| Occidental Mindoro | Eduardo Gadiano | PFP | Eduardo Gadiano | PFP | Unopposed |
| Oriental Mindoro | Humerlito Dolor | GSM | Humerlito Dolor | GSM | 24.61% |
| Palawan | Victorino Dennis Socrates | Aksyon | Amy Alvarez | PPPL | 15.28% |
| Puerto Princesa (HUC) | Lucilo Bayron | PFP | Lucilo Bayron | PFP | 1.11% |
| Romblon | Jose Riano | PFP | Trina Firmalo-Fabic | Liberal | 9.88% |

=== Vice governors ===
| Province/city | Incumbent | Incumbent's party | Winner | Winner's party | Winning margin |
|---|---|---|---|---|---|
| Marinduque | Lyn Angeles | PFP | Romulo Bacorro | Independent | 18.72% |
| Occidental Mindoro | Diana Apigo-Tayag | PFP | Diana Apigo-Tayag | PFP | 43.00% |
| Oriental Mindoro | Ejay Falcon | GSM | Jojo Perez | MBS | 15.46% |
| Palawan | Onsoy Ola | PPPL | Onsoy Ola | PPPL | 20.41% |
| Puerto Princesa (HUC) | Nancy Socrates | Lakas | Jimbo Maristela | Liberal | 11.44% |
| Romblon | Arming Gutierrez | PFP | Arming Gutierrez | PFP | 15.12% |

=== Provincial boards ===
| Province/city | Seats | Party control | | Composition |
| Province/city | Seats | Previous | Result | Composition |
|---|---|---|---|---|
| Marinduque | 10 elected 3 ex-officio | PDP–Laban | No majority | PFP (6); Lakas (1); Independent (3) |
| Occidental Mindoro | 10 elected 4 ex-officio | No majority | PFP | PFP (8); Liberal (1); Nacionalista (1) |
| Oriental Mindoro | 10 elected 3 ex-officio | No majority | No majority | GSM (5); MBS (2); PFP (2); Lakas (1) |
| Palawan | 10 elected 4 ex-officio | No majority | PPPL | PPPL (9); PRP (1) |
| Puerto Princesa (HUC) | 10 elected 3 ex-officio | PDP–Laban | PFP | PFP (8); Lakas (1); PDP–Laban (1) |
| Romblon | 10 elected 3 ex-officio | No majority | No majority | PFP (5); Nacionalista (3); Liberal (2) |

== Marinduque ==
=== Governor ===
Incumbent Governor Presbitero Velasco Jr. of the Partido Federal ng Pilipinas ran for the House of Representatives in Marinduque's lone legislative district. He was previously affiliated with PDP–Laban.

Velasco endorsed his son, representative Lord Allan Velasco of the Nationalist People's Coalition, who was defeated by former provincial board member Mel Go of the PDP–Laban.

| Candidate | Party | Votes | % |
|---|---|---|---|
| Mel Go | PDP–Laban | 66,115 | 50.15 |
| Lord Allan Velasco | Nationalist People's Coalition | 65,726 | 49.85 |
| Total | | 131,841 | 100.00 |
| Valid votes | | 131,841 | 92.84 |
| Invalid/blank votes | | 10,175 | 7.16 |
| Total votes | | 142,016 | 100.00 |
| Registered voters/turnout | | 165,436 | 85.84 |
| PDP–Laban gain from PFP | | | |
Source: Commission on Elections

=== Vice Governor ===
Incumbent Vice Governor Lyn Angeles of the Partido Federal ng Pilipinas ran for a second term. She was previously affiliated with PDP–Laban.

Angeles was defeated by former Marinduque vice governor Romulo Bacorro, an independent.

| Candidate | Party | Votes | % |
|---|---|---|---|
| Romulo Bacorro | Independent | 75,930 | 59.36 |
| Lyn Angeles (incumbent) | Partido Federal ng Pilipinas | 51,982 | 40.64 |
| Total | | 127,912 | 100.00 |
| Valid votes | | 127,912 | 90.07 |
| Invalid/blank votes | | 14,104 | 9.93 |
| Total votes | | 142,016 | 100.00 |
| Registered voters/turnout | | 165,436 | 85.84 |
| Independent gain from PFP | | | |
Source: Commission on Elections

=== Provincial Board ===
Since Marinduque's reclassification as a 2nd class province in 2025, the Marinduque Provincial Board is composed of 13 board members, 10 of whom are elected.

The Partido Federal ng Pilipinas won six seats, becoming the largest party in the provincial board.

| Party | Votes | % | Seats | +/– |
|---|---|---|---|---|
| Partido Federal ng Pilipinas | 234,079 | 59.92 | 6 | New |
| Lakas–CMD | 30,840 | 7.89 | 1 | New |
| Independent | 125,728 | 32.18 | 3 | +2 |
| Total | 390,647 | 100.00 | 10 | +2 |
| Total votes | 142,016 | – | | |
| Registered voters/turnout | 165,436 | 85.84 | | |
Source: Commission on Elections

==== 1st district ====
Marinduque's 1st provincial district consists of the municipalities of Boac, Gasan and Mogpog. Five board members are elected from this provincial district.

Seven candidates were included in the ballot.

| Candidate | Party | Votes | % |
|---|---|---|---|
| Macky Caballes (incumbent) | Partido Federal ng Pilipinas | 41,396 | 19.02 |
| Tres Mangcucang (incumbent) | Partido Federal ng Pilipinas | 35,138 | 16.15 |
| Gilbert Daquioag | Independent | 33,730 | 15.50 |
| Jojo Leva (incumbent) | Partido Federal ng Pilipinas | 29,520 | 13.56 |
| John Pelaez | Independent | 28,518 | 13.10 |
| Luisito Majaba | Independent | 27,302 | 12.54 |
| Robert Opis | Partido Federal ng Pilipinas | 22,031 | 10.12 |
| Total | | 217,635 | 100.00 |
| Total votes | | 75,263 | – |
| Registered voters/turnout | | 86,344 | 87.17 |
Source: Commission on Elections

==== 2nd district ====
Marinduque's 2nd provincial district consists of the municipalities of Buenavista, Santa Cruz and Torrijos. Five board members are elected from this provincial district.

Seven candidates were included in the ballot.

| Candidate | Party | Votes | % |
|---|---|---|---|
| Joam Morales | Lakas–CMD | 30,840 | 17.83 |
| Danny Red (incumbent) | Partido Federal ng Pilipinas | 28,550 | 16.50 |
| Mercy Rejano (incumbent) | Partido Federal ng Pilipinas | 27,938 | 16.15 |
| Primo Cruzado Pamintuan | Independent | 25,276 | 14.61 |
| Ishmael Lim (incumbent) | Partido Federal ng Pilipinas | 24,956 | 14.42 |
| Mel Encabo (incumbent) | Partido Federal ng Pilipinas | 24,550 | 14.19 |
| Mike Cabagon | Independent | 10,902 | 6.30 |
| Total | | 173,012 | 100.00 |
| Total votes | | 66,753 | – |
| Registered voters/turnout | | 79,092 | 84.40 |
Source: Commission on Elections

== Occidental Mindoro ==
=== Governor ===
Incumbent Governor Eduardo Gadiano of the Partido Federal ng Pilipinas won re-election for a third term unopposed. He was previously affiliated with Pederalismo ng Dugong Dakilang Samahan.

| Candidate | Party | Votes | % |
|---|---|---|---|
| Eduardo Gadiano (incumbent) | Partido Federal ng Pilipinas | 200,673 | 100.00 |
| Total | | 200,673 | 100.00 |
| Valid votes | | 200,673 | 78.38 |
| Invalid/blank votes | | 55,361 | 21.62 |
| Total votes | | 256,034 | 100.00 |
| Registered voters/turnout | | 321,699 | 79.59 |
| PFP hold | | | |
Source: Commission on Elections

=== Vice Governor ===
Incumbent Vice Governor Diana Apigo-Tayag of the Partido Federal ng Pilipinas ran for a second term. She was previously affiliated with Pederalismo ng Dugong Dakilang Samahan.

Apigo-Tayag won re-election against provincial board member AJ Rebong (Aksyon Demokratiko).

| Candidate | Party | Votes | % |
|---|---|---|---|
| Diana Apigo-Tayag (incumbent) | Partido Federal ng Pilipinas | 161,841 | 71.50 |
| AJ Rebong | Aksyon Demokratiko | 64,496 | 28.50 |
| Total | | 226,337 | 100.00 |
| Valid votes | | 226,337 | 88.40 |
| Invalid/blank votes | | 29,697 | 11.60 |
| Total votes | | 256,034 | 100.00 |
| Registered voters/turnout | | 321,699 | 79.59 |
| PFP hold | | | |
Source: Commission on Elections

=== Provincial Board ===
The Occidental Mindoro Provincial Board is composed of 14 board members, 10 of whom are elected.

The Partido Federal ng Pilipinas won eight seats, gaining a majority in the provincial board.

| Party | Votes | % | Seats | +/– |
|---|---|---|---|---|
| Partido Federal ng Pilipinas | 506,522 | 57.74 | 8 | New |
| Liberal Party | 214,225 | 24.42 | 1 | –2 |
| Aksyon Demokratiko | 59,971 | 6.84 | 0 | New |
| Nacionalista Party | 45,583 | 5.20 | 1 | 0 |
| PDP–Laban | 30,762 | 3.51 | 0 | 0 |
| Independent | 20,237 | 2.31 | 0 | 0 |
| Total | 877,300 | 100.00 | 10 | 0 |
| Total votes | 256,034 | – | | |
| Registered voters/turnout | 321,699 | 79.59 | | |
Source: Commission on Elections

==== 1st district ====
Occidental Mindoro's 1st provincial district consists of the municipalities of Abra de Ilog, Looc, Lubang, Mamburao, Paluan, Sablayan and Santa Cruz. Five board members are elected from this provincial district.

12 candidates were included in the ballot.

| Candidate | Party | Votes | % |
|---|---|---|---|
| Peter Alfaro | Partido Federal ng Pilipinas | 61,511 | 13.52 |
| Ryan Sioson (incumbent) | Partido Federal ng Pilipinas | 59,889 | 13.17 |
| Eddie Masangkay (incumbent) | Partido Federal ng Pilipinas | 58,555 | 12.87 |
| Jun Tejoso (incumbent) | Partido Federal ng Pilipinas | 55,482 | 12.20 |
| Jill Espejo | Liberal Party | 42,880 | 9.43 |
| Miko Medalla | Liberal Party | 38,199 | 8.40 |
| Nestor Tria | Partido Federal ng Pilipinas | 35,031 | 7.70 |
| Jun Abeleda | Liberal Party | 33,842 | 7.44 |
| Joel Panaligan | Liberal Party | 29,072 | 6.39 |
| Boy Alvarez | PDP–Laban | 21,837 | 4.80 |
| Florefe Chua | Independent | 9,579 | 2.11 |
| Toti Ramos | PDP–Laban | 8,925 | 1.96 |
| Total | | 454,802 | 100.00 |
| Total votes | | 133,221 | – |
| Registered voters/turnout | | 168,006 | 79.30 |
Source: Commission on Elections

==== 2nd district ====
Occidental Mindoro's 2nd provincial district consists of the municipalities of Calintaan, Magsaysay, Rizal and San Jose. Five board members are elected from this provincial district.

12 candidates were included in the ballot.

| Candidate | Party | Votes | % |
|---|---|---|---|
| Coco Mendiola (incumbent) | Partido Federal ng Pilipinas | 55,269 | 13.08 |
| Roderick Agas | Partido Federal ng Pilipinas | 53,902 | 12.76 |
| Sonia Pablo | Nacionalista Party | 45,583 | 10.79 |
| Arnel Argame | Partido Federal ng Pilipinas | 44,454 | 10.52 |
| Alex del Valle (incumbent) | Partido Federal ng Pilipinas | 43,588 | 10.32 |
| Nathaniel Cruz (incumbent) | Partido Federal ng Pilipinas | 38,841 | 9.19 |
| Michelle Festin-Rivera | Liberal Party | 38,493 | 9.11 |
| Erning Jaravata | Liberal Party | 31,739 | 7.51 |
| Kendi Villaroza (incumbent) | Aksyon Demokratiko | 30,500 | 7.22 |
| Uly Javier (incumbent) | Aksyon Demokratiko | 29,471 | 6.98 |
| Ana Andrade | Independent | 7,789 | 1.84 |
| Juanito Lumawig | Independent | 2,869 | 0.68 |
| Total | | 422,498 | 100.00 |
| Total votes | | 122,813 | – |
| Registered voters/turnout | | 153,693 | 79.91 |
Source: Commission on Elections

== Oriental Mindoro ==
=== Governor ===
Incumbent Governor Humerlito Dolor of Galing at Serbisyo para sa Mindoreño ran for a third term. He was previously affiliated with PDP–Laban.

Dolor won re-election against two other candidates.

| Candidate | Party | Votes | % |
|---|---|---|---|
| Humerlito Dolor (incumbent) | Galing at Serbisyo para sa Mindoreño | 235,935 | 54.34 |
| Joanna Valencia | Independent | 129,070 | 29.73 |
| Orven Rabino | Independent | 69,168 | 15.93 |
| Total | | 434,173 | 100.00 |
| Valid votes | | 434,173 | 93.18 |
| Invalid/blank votes | | 31,761 | 6.82 |
| Total votes | | 465,934 | 100.00 |
| Registered voters/turnout | | 569,601 | 81.80 |
| GSM hold | | | |
Source: Commission on Elections

=== Vice Governor ===
Incumbent Vice Governor Ejay Falcon of Galing at Serbisyo para sa Mindoreño (GSM) ran for the House of Representatives in Oriental Mindoro's 2nd legislative district. He was previously affiliated with PDP–Laban.

GSM nominated Governor Humerlito Dolor's brother, Oriental Mindoro administrator Hubbert Dolor, who was defeated by former Oriental Mindoro vice governor Jojo Perez of Mindoro Bago Sarili. Mong dela Fuente (Independent) also ran for vice governor.

| Candidate | Party | Votes | % |
|---|---|---|---|
| Jojo Perez | Mindoro Bago Sarili | 192,571 | 46.08 |
| Hubbert Dolor | Galing at Serbisyo para sa Mindoreño | 127,953 | 30.62 |
| Mong dela Fuente | Independent | 97,337 | 23.29 |
| Total | | 417,861 | 100.00 |
| Valid votes | | 417,861 | 89.68 |
| Invalid/blank votes | | 48,073 | 10.32 |
| Total votes | | 465,934 | 100.00 |
| Registered voters/turnout | | 569,601 | 81.80 |
| MBS gain from GSM | | | |
Source: Commission on Elections

=== Provincial Board ===
The Oriental Mindoro Provincial Board is composed of 13 board members, 10 of whom are elected.

Galing at Serbisyo para sa Mindoreño won five seats, becoming the largest party in the provincial board.

| Party | Votes | % | Seats | +/– |
|---|---|---|---|---|
| Galing at Serbisyo para sa Mindoreño | 810,642 | 52.47 | 5 | New |
| Mindoro Bago Sarili | 384,307 | 24.88 | 2 | –3 |
| Partido Federal ng Pilipinas | 181,597 | 11.75 | 2 | +1 |
| Lakas–CMD | 149,504 | 9.68 | 1 | New |
| Independent | 18,892 | 1.22 | 0 | 0 |
| Total | 1,544,942 | 100.00 | 10 | 0 |
| Total votes | 465,934 | – | | |
| Registered voters/turnout | 569,601 | 81.80 | | |
Source: Commission on Elections

==== 1st district ====
Oriental Mindoro's 1st provincial district consists of the same area as Oriental Mindoro's 1st legislative district. Five board members are elected from this provincial district.

10 candidates were included in the ballot.

| Candidate | Party | Votes | % |
|---|---|---|---|
| Bong Brucal (incumbent) | Mindoro Bago Sarili | 133,267 | 16.05 |
| RL Leachon | Mindoro Bago Sarili | 109,910 | 13.24 |
| Alely Casubuan (incumbent) | Galing at Serbisyo para sa Mindoreño | 97,386 | 11.73 |
| Fay Ilano (incumbent) | Galing at Serbisyo para sa Mindoreño | 94,868 | 11.42 |
| Ryan Arago | Galing at Serbisyo para sa Mindoreño | 91,095 | 10.97 |
| Jun Panaligan | Galing at Serbisyo para sa Mindoreño | 79,516 | 9.58 |
| Jocy Neria (incumbent) | Mindoro Bago Sarili | 77,536 | 9.34 |
| Miko Atienza | Galing at Serbisyo para sa Mindoreño | 72,621 | 8.75 |
| Charles Pansoy | Mindoro Bago Sarili | 63,594 | 7.66 |
| Emman Agutaya | Independent | 10,614 | 1.28 |
| Total | | 830,407 | 100.00 |
| Total votes | | 250,688 | – |
| Registered voters/turnout | | 308,447 | 81.27 |
Source: Commission on Elections

==== 2nd district ====
Oriental Mindoro's 2nd provincial district consists of the same area as Oriental Mindoro's 2nd legislative district. Five board members are elected from this provincial district.

10 candidates were included in the ballot.

| Candidate | Party | Votes | % |
|---|---|---|---|
| Pau Umali (incumbent) | Partido Federal ng Pilipinas | 111,180 | 15.56 |
| Roland Ruga (incumbent) | Galing at Serbisyo para sa Mindoreño | 101,260 | 14.17 |
| Jom Dimapilis (incumbent) | Galing at Serbisyo para sa Mindoreño | 96,491 | 13.50 |
| Anthony Yap | Lakas–CMD | 84,804 | 11.87 |
| Manny Buenaventura | Partido Federal ng Pilipinas | 70,417 | 9.85 |
| Jigs Talens | Galing at Serbisyo para sa Mindoreño | 65,352 | 9.15 |
| Vico Ong | Lakas–CMD | 64,700 | 9.05 |
| Niño Liwanag | Galing at Serbisyo para sa Mindoreño | 64,354 | 9.01 |
| Butch Buenaventura | Galing at Serbisyo para sa Mindoreño | 47,699 | 6.68 |
| Romy Sadiwa | Independent | 8,278 | 1.16 |
| Total | | 714,535 | 100.00 |
| Total votes | | 215,246 | – |
| Registered voters/turnout | | 261,154 | 82.42 |
Source: Commission on Elections

== Palawan ==
=== Governor ===
Incumbent Governor Victorino Dennis Socrates of Aksyon Demokratiko ran for a second term. He was previously affiliated with the Partidong Pagbabago ng Palawan.

Socrates was defeated by San Vicente mayor Amy Alvarez of the Partidong Pagbabago ng Palawan. Richard Lopez (Reform PH Party) also ran for governor.

| Candidate | Party | Votes | % |
|---|---|---|---|
| Amy Alvarez | Partidong Pagbabago ng Palawan | 264,363 | 56.88 |
| Victorino Dennis Socrates (incumbent) | Aksyon Demokratiko | 193,336 | 41.60 |
| Richard Lopez | Reform PH Party | 7,034 | 1.51 |
| Total | | 464,733 | 100.00 |
| Valid votes | | 464,733 | 91.42 |
| Invalid/blank votes | | 43,611 | 8.58 |
| Total votes | | 508,344 | 100.00 |
| Registered voters/turnout | | 605,940 | 83.89 |
| PPPL gain from Aksyon | | | |
Source: Commission on Elections

=== Vice Governor ===
Incumbent Vice Governor Onsoy Ola of the Partidong Pagbabago ng Palawan ran for a second term.

Ola won re-election against former representative Frederick Abueg (Liberal Party) and former Palawan vice governor Art Ventura (Independent).

| Candidate | Party | Votes | % |
|---|---|---|---|
| Onsoy Ola (incumbent) | Partidong Pagbabago ng Palawan | 234,749 | 56.18 |
| Frederick Abueg | Liberal Party | 149,453 | 35.77 |
| Art Ventura | Independent | 33,663 | 8.06 |
| Total | | 417,865 | 100.00 |
| Valid votes | | 417,865 | 82.20 |
| Invalid/blank votes | | 90,479 | 17.80 |
| Total votes | | 508,344 | 100.00 |
| Registered voters/turnout | | 605,940 | 83.89 |
| PPPL hold | | | |
Source: Commission on Elections

=== Provincial Board ===
The Palawan Provincial Board is composed of 14 board members, 10 of whom are elected.

The Partidong Pagbabago ng Palawan won nine seats, gaining a majority in the provincial board.

| Party | Votes | % | Seats | +/– |
|---|---|---|---|---|
| Partidong Pagbabago ng Palawan | 866,436 | 58.43 | 9 | +6 |
| Aksyon Demokratiko | 236,229 | 15.93 | 0 | –2 |
| People's Reform Party | 174,051 | 11.74 | 1 | 0 |
| Liberal Party | 82,175 | 5.54 | 0 | New |
| Nacionalista Party | 10,117 | 0.68 | 0 | New |
| Independent | 113,930 | 7.68 | 0 | 0 |
| Total | 1,482,938 | 100.00 | 10 | 0 |
| Total votes | 508,344 | – | | |
| Registered voters/turnout | 605,940 | 83.89 | | |
Source: Commission on Elections

==== 1st district ====
Palawan's 1st provincial district consists of the same area as Palawan's 1st legislative district. Five board members are elected from this provincial district.

12 candidates were included in the ballot.

| Candidate | Party | Votes | % |
|---|---|---|---|
| Anton Alvarez (incumbent) | Partidong Pagbabago ng Palawan | 105,912 | 12.41 |
| Winston Arzaga (incumbent) | Partidong Pagbabago ng Palawan | 95,446 | 11.19 |
| Maria Angela Sabando (incumbent) | People's Reform Party | 94,097 | 11.03 |
| Toto Pineda (incumbent) | Partidong Pagbabago ng Palawan | 91,531 | 10.73 |
| Cherry Pie Acosta | Partidong Pagbabago ng Palawan | 84,875 | 9.95 |
| David Ponce de Leon | Liberal Party | 82,175 | 9.63 |
| Nieves Rosento (incumbent) | People's Reform Party | 79,954 | 9.37 |
| Crite Miguel | Aksyon Demokratiko | 58,628 | 6.87 |
| Ramon Zabala | Partidong Pagbabago ng Palawan | 53,048 | 6.22 |
| Elvin Edonga | Independent | 29,991 | 3.51 |
| Arnel Abrina | Independent | 57,861 | 6.78 |
| Antonio Magbanua Jr. | Independent | 19,790 | 2.32 |
| Total | | 853,308 | 100.00 |
| Total votes | | 257,337 | – |
| Registered voters/turnout | | 302,220 | 85.15 |
Source: Commission on Elections

==== 2nd district ====
Palawan's 2nd provincial district consists of the same area as Palawan's 2nd legislative district. Four board members are elected from this provincial district.

Nine candidates were included in the ballot.

| Candidate | Party | Votes | % |
|---|---|---|---|
| Al Ibba (incumbent) | Partidong Pagbabago ng Palawan | 126,440 | 20.77 |
| Ryan Maminta (incumbent) | Partidong Pagbabago ng Palawan | 113,525 | 18.65 |
| Marivic Roxas (incumbent) | Partidong Pagbabago ng Palawan | 98,328 | 16.15 |
| Aris Arzaga (incumbent) | Partidong Pagbabago ng Palawan | 86,494 | 14.21 |
| Sharon Abiog-Onda | Aksyon Demokratiko | 74,052 | 12.17 |
| Nelson Gabayan | Aksyon Demokratiko | 39,228 | 6.44 |
| Nesario Awat | Aksyon Demokratiko | 33,351 | 5.48 |
| Belen Abordo | Aksyon Demokratiko | 30,970 | 5.09 |
| Oscar Espinas | Independent | 6,288 | 1.03 |
| Total | | 608,676 | 100.00 |
| Total votes | | 226,833 | – |
| Registered voters/turnout | | 275,287 | 82.40 |
Source: Commission on Elections

==== 3rd district ====
Palawan's 3rd provincial district consists of the municipality of Aborlan. One board member is elected from this provincial district.

Two candidates were included in the ballot.

| Candidate | Party | Votes | % |
|---|---|---|---|
| Rafael Ortega Jr. (incumbent) | Partidong Pagbabago ng Palawan | 10,837 | 51.72 |
| Efren Empot | Nacionalista Party | 10,117 | 48.28 |
| Total | | 20,954 | 100.00 |
| Total votes | | 24,174 | – |
| Registered voters/turnout | | 28,433 | 85.02 |
Source: Commission on Elections

== Puerto Princesa ==
=== Mayor ===
Incumbent Mayor Lucilo Bayron Partido Federal ng Pilipinas ran for a third term. He was previously affiliated with PDP–Laban.

Bayron won re-election against Puerto Princesa vice mayor Nancy Socrates (Lakas–CMD), former city councilor Gerry Abordo (Katipunan ng Kamalayang Kayumanggi) and two other candidates.

| Candidate | Party | Votes | % |
|---|---|---|---|
| Lucilo Bayron (incumbent) | Partido Federal ng Pilipinas | 73,445 | 49.72 |
| Nancy Socrates | Lakas–CMD | 71,799 | 48.61 |
| Gerry Abordo | Katipunan ng Kamalayang Kayumanggi | 1,770 | 1.20 |
| Edmund Katon | Independent | 494 | 0.33 |
| Eliceo Oloroso | Reform PH Party | 195 | 0.13 |
| Total | | 147,703 | 100.00 |
| Valid votes | | 147,703 | 96.21 |
| Invalid/blank votes | | 5,818 | 3.79 |
| Total votes | | 153,521 | 100.00 |
| Registered voters/turnout | | 181,815 | 84.44 |
| PFP hold | | | |
Source: Commission on Elections

=== Vice Mayor ===
Incumbent Vice Mayor Nancy Socrates of Lakas–CMD ran for mayor of Puerto Princesa. She was previously affiliated with Aksyon Demokratiko.

Socrates endorsed former city councilor Jimbo Maristela (Liberal Party), who won the election against Mayor Lucilo Bayron's daughter, Puerto Princesa councilor Raine Bayron (Partido Federal ng Pilipinas), and Larry dela Puerta (Reform PH Party).

| Candidate | Party | Votes | % |
|---|---|---|---|
| Jimbo Maristela | Liberal Party | 79,539 | 55.08 |
| Raine Bayron | Partido Federal ng Pilipinas | 63,016 | 43.64 |
| Larry dela Puerta | Reform PH Party | 1,841 | 1.27 |
| Total | | 144,396 | 100.00 |
| Valid votes | | 144,396 | 94.06 |
| Invalid/blank votes | | 9,125 | 5.94 |
| Total votes | | 153,521 | 100.00 |
| Registered voters/turnout | | 181,815 | 84.44 |
| Liberal gain from Lakas | | | |
Source: Commission on Elections

=== City Council ===
The Puerto Princesa City Council is composed of 13 councilors, 10 of whom are elected.

30 candidates were included in the ballot.

The Partido Federal ng Pilipinas won eight seats, gaining a majority in the city council.

| Party | Votes | % | Seats | +/– |
|---|---|---|---|---|
| Partido Federal ng Pilipinas | 550,635 | 51.87 | 8 | New |
| Lakas–CMD | 210,967 | 19.87 | 1 | New |
| Liberal Party | 110,041 | 10.37 | 0 | 0 |
| PDP–Laban | 49,676 | 4.68 | 1 | –8 |
| Independent | 140,206 | 13.21 | 0 | –1 |
| Total | 1,061,525 | 100.00 | 10 | 0 |
| Total votes | 153,521 | – | | |
| Registered voters/turnout | 181,815 | 84.44 | | |
Source: Commission on Elections

| Candidate | Party | Votes | % |
|---|---|---|---|
| Patrick Hagedorn (incumbent) | Partido Federal ng Pilipinas | 87,524 | 8.25 |
| Luis Marcaida III (incumbent) | Partido Federal ng Pilipinas | 72,791 | 6.86 |
| Matt Mendoza | Partido Federal ng Pilipinas | 70,745 | 6.66 |
| Jonjie Rodriguez (incumbent) | Partido Federal ng Pilipinas | 64,632 | 6.09 |
| Herbert Dilig (incumbent) | Partido Federal ng Pilipinas | 55,288 | 5.21 |
| Gerry Abad | Partido Federal ng Pilipinas | 55,257 | 5.21 |
| Bitoy Oliveros (incumbent) | Partido Federal ng Pilipinas | 52,989 | 4.99 |
| Elgin Robert Damasco (incumbent) | PDP–Laban | 49,676 | 4.68 |
| Erwin Edualino | Partido Federal ng Pilipinas | 46,873 | 4.42 |
| Jie Lao | Lakas–CMD | 46,325 | 4.36 |
| Roy Ventura | Partido Federal ng Pilipinas | 44,536 | 4.20 |
| Joaquin Philippe Ortega | Independent | 41,226 | 3.88 |
| Dio de Guzman | Liberal Party | 40,917 | 3.85 |
| Pam Ponce de Leon | Liberal Party | 38,220 | 3.60 |
| Vangie Carbonell-Aquino | Lakas–CMD | 34,881 | 3.29 |
| Leo Pinto | Lakas–CMD | 33,610 | 3.17 |
| Cocoy Gabuco | Lakas–CMD | 32,865 | 3.10 |
| Cesar Javarez | Liberal Party | 30,904 | 2.91 |
| Jim Cañete | Independent | 27,815 | 2.62 |
| Francis Lara | Lakas–CMD | 22,198 | 2.09 |
| Bornok Rodriguez | Lakas–CMD | 21,943 | 2.07 |
| Bong Magay | Lakas–CMD | 19,145 | 1.80 |
| Florante Antazo | Independent | 17,081 | 1.61 |
| Louie Larosa | Independent | 16,960 | 1.60 |
| Bong Villanueva | Independent | 15,625 | 1.47 |
| Alfredo Mondragon Jr. | Independent | 8,951 | 0.84 |
| Buddy Tinay | Independent | 5,246 | 0.49 |
| Sabino Camacho Jr. | Independent | 3,432 | 0.32 |
| Palos Minerva | Independent | 2,037 | 0.19 |
| Murphy Tadjurie | Independent | 1,833 | 0.17 |
| Total | | 1,061,525 | 100.00 |
| Total votes | | 153,521 | – |
| Registered voters/turnout | | 181,815 | 84.44 |
Source: Commission on Elections

== Romblon ==
=== Governor ===
Incumbent Governor Jose Riano of the Partido Federal ng Pilipinas ran for a third term. He was previously affiliated with PDP–Laban.

Riano was defeated by Odiongan mayor Trina Firmalo-Fabic of the Liberal Party. Former Magdiwang mayor Jolly Monton (Partido Maharlika) also ran for governor.

| Candidate | Party | Votes | % |
|---|---|---|---|
| Trina Firmalo-Fabic | Liberal Party | 93,425 | 54.67 |
| Jose Riano (incumbent) | Partido Federal ng Pilipinas | 76,541 | 44.79 |
| Jolly Monton | Partido Maharlika | 930 | 0.54 |
| Total | | 170,896 | 100.00 |
| Valid votes | | 170,896 | 95.58 |
| Invalid/blank votes | | 7,904 | 4.42 |
| Total votes | | 178,800 | 100.00 |
| Registered voters/turnout | | 211,336 | 84.60 |
| Liberal gain from PFP | | | |
Source: Commission on Elections

=== Vice Governor ===
Incumbent Vice Governor Arming Gutierrez of the Partido Federal ng Pilipinas ran for a second term. He was previously affiliated with PDP–Laban.

Gutierrez won re-election against Rodne Galicha (Liberal Party).

| Candidate | Party | Votes | % |
|---|---|---|---|
| Arming Gutierrez (incumbent) | Partido Federal ng Pilipinas | 81,785 | 57.56 |
| Rodne Galicha | Liberal Party | 60,302 | 42.44 |
| Total | | 142,087 | 100.00 |
| Valid votes | | 142,087 | 79.47 |
| Invalid/blank votes | | 36,713 | 20.53 |
| Total votes | | 178,800 | 100.00 |
| Registered voters/turnout | | 211,336 | 84.60 |
| PFP hold | | | |
Source: Commission on Elections

=== Provincial Board ===
Since Romblon's reclassification as a 2nd class province, the Romblon Provincial Board consists of 13 board members, 10 of whom are elected.

The Partido Federal ng Pilipinas won five seats, becoming the largest party in the provincial board.

| Party | Votes | % | Seats | +/– |
|---|---|---|---|---|
| Liberal Party | 198,242 | 36.05 | 2 | +2 |
| Partido Federal ng Pilipinas | 196,610 | 35.75 | 5 | New |
| Nacionalista Party | 115,640 | 21.03 | 3 | –2 |
| Nationalist People's Coalition | 20,193 | 3.67 | 0 | New |
| Independent | 19,274 | 3.50 | 0 | New |
| Total | 549,959 | 100.00 | 10 | +2 |
| Total votes | 178,800 | – | | |
| Registered voters/turnout | 211,336 | 84.60 | | |
Source: Commission on Elections

==== 1st district ====
Romblon's 1st provincial district consists of the municipalities of Banton, Concepcion, Corcuera, San Fernando, Magdiwang, Cajidiocan, Romblon and San Agustin. Five board members are elected from this provincial district.

Nine candidates were included in the ballot.

| Candidate | Party | Votes | % |
|---|---|---|---|
| Aaronn Riano | Partido Federal ng Pilipinas | 43,776 | 16.92 |
| Nene Solis (incumbent) | Nacionalista Party | 39,044 | 15.09 |
| Guds Mortel (incumbent) | Partido Federal ng Pilipinas | 35,385 | 13.68 |
| Cary Falculan | Liberal Party | 30,577 | 11.82 |
| Abner Perez | Partido Federal ng Pilipinas | 26,022 | 10.06 |
| Aura Tan | Liberal Party | 25,735 | 9.95 |
| Japhet Rios | Liberal Party | 25,708 | 9.94 |
| Roque Manalon | Nationalist People's Coalition | 20,193 | 7.80 |
| Mayong Roldan | Liberal Party | 12,292 | 4.75 |
| Total | | 258,732 | 100.00 |
| Total votes | | 83,189 | – |
| Registered voters/turnout | | 98,840 | 84.17 |
Source: Commission on Elections

==== 2nd district ====
Romblon's 2nd provincial district consists of the municipalities of Alcantara, Ferrol, Looc, Odiongan, San Andres, San Jose, Calatrava, Santa Fe, and Santa Maria. Five board members are elected from this provincial district.

Nine candidates were included in the ballot.

| Candidate | Party | Votes | % |
|---|---|---|---|
| Irene Morgado | Partido Federal ng Pilipinas | 51,150 | 17.56 |
| Bing Solis (incumbent) | Partido Federal ng Pilipinas | 40,277 | 13.83 |
| Boy Maravilla (incumbent) | Nacionalista Party | 38,633 | 13.27 |
| Jojo Beltran (incumbent) | Nacionalista Party | 37,963 | 13.04 |
| Ricmel Falqueza | Liberal Party | 33,554 | 11.52 |
| Joey Venancio | Liberal Party | 29,697 | 10.20 |
| W. Melwin Punzalan | Liberal Party | 20,799 | 7.14 |
| Alexander Formento | Liberal Party | 19,880 | 6.83 |
| Alvin Galindez | Independent | 19,274 | 6.62 |
| Total | | 291,227 | 100.00 |
| Total votes | | 95,611 | – |
| Registered voters/turnout | | 112,496 | 84.99 |
Source: Commission on Elections
