= 2022 Philippine local elections in Mimaropa =

- May 9, 2022
- Gubernatorial elections
- 5 provincial governors and 1 city mayor
Party	Seats	+/–
PDP–Laban	4	−1
PDDS	1	0
PPPL	1	New
This lists parties that won seats. See the complete results below.
- Vice gubernatorial elections
- 5 provincial vice governors and 1 city vice mayor
Party	Seats	+/–
PDP–Laban	3	−1
Aksyon	1	+1
PDDS	1	+1
PPPL	1	0
This lists parties that won seats. See the complete results below.
- Provincial Board elections
- 46 provincial board members and 10 city councilors
Party	Seats	+/–
PDP–Laban	24	+8
Nacionalista	6	−1
MBS	5	New
PDDS	5	+3
Liberal	4	−9
PPPL	3	−6
Aksyon	2	New
Lakas	2	+2
NUP	1	+1
PRP	1	New
PFP	1	−2
Independent	2	+1
This lists parties that won seats. See the complete results below.

The 2022 Philippine local elections in Mimaropa were held on May 9, 2022.

== Summary ==
=== Governors ===
Province/city	Incumbent	Incumbent's party	Winner	Winner's party	Winning margin
Marinduque	Presbitero Velasco Jr.	PDP–Laban	Presbitero Velasco Jr.	PDP–Laban	17.56%
Occidental Mindoro	Eduardo Gadiano	PDDS	Eduardo Gadiano	PDDS	23.93%
Oriental Mindoro	Humerlito Dolor	PDP–Laban	Humerlito Dolor	PDP–Laban	16.74%
Palawan	Jose Alvarez	PDP–Laban	Victorino Dennis Socrates	PPPL	10.11%
Puerto Princesa (HUC)	Lucilo Bayron	PDP–Laban	Lucilo Bayron	PDP–Laban	18.87%
Romblon	Jose Riano	PDP–Laban	Jose Riano	PDP–Laban	18.50%

=== Vice governors ===
Province/city	Incumbent	Incumbent's party	Winner	Winner's party	Winning margin
Marinduque	Jun Bacorro	Aksyon	Lyn Angeles	PDP–Laban	5.89%
Occidental Mindoro	Peter Alfaro	PDP–Laban	Diana Apigo-Tayag	PDDS	26.52%
Oriental Mindoro	Jojo Perez	MBS	Ejay Falcon	PDP–Laban	9.98%
Palawan	Victorino Dennis Socrates	PPPL	Onsoy Ola	PPPL	36.31%
Puerto Princesa (HUC)	Nancy Socrates	Aksyon	Nancy Socrates	Aksyon	60.88%
Romblon	Dongdong Ylagan	Aksyon	Arming Gutierrez	PDP–Laban	1.90%

=== Provincial boards ===
Province/city	Seats	Party control		Composition
Province/city	Seats	Previous	Result	Composition
Marinduque	8 elected 3 ex-officio	PDP–Laban	PDP–Laban	PDP–Laban (7); Independent (1)
Occidental Mindoro	10 elected 4 ex-officio	No majority	No majority	PDDS (5); Liberal (3); Lakas (1); Nacionalista (1)
Oriental Mindoro	10 elected 3 ex-officio	No majority	No majority	MBS (5); PDP–Laban (3); Liberal (1); PFP (1)
Palawan	10 elected 4 ex-officio	No majority	No majority	PPPL (3); PDP–Laban (2); Aksyon (2); PRP (1); NUP (1); Lakas (1)
Puerto Princesa (HUC)	10 elected 3 ex-officio	No majority	PDP–Laban	PDP–Laban (9); Independent (1)
Romblon	8 elected 3 ex-officio	Nacionalista	No majority	Nacionalista (5); PDP–Laban (3)

== Marinduque ==
=== Governor ===
Incumbent Governor Presbitero Velasco Jr. of PDP–Laban ran for a second term.

Velasco won re-election against Marinduque vice governor Jun Bacorro (Aksyon Demokratiko) and Marinduque Liga ng mga Barangay president James Lim (Alliance for Barangay Concerns).

Candidate	Party	Votes	%
Presbitero Velasco Jr. (incumbent)	PDP–Laban	63,115	48.08
Jun Bacorro	Aksyon Demokratiko	40,063	30.52
James Lim	Alliance for Barangay Concerns	28,086	21.40
Total		131,264	100.00
Total votes		140,674	–
Registered voters/turnout		161,538	87.08
PDP–Laban hold			
Source: Commission on Elections

=== Vice Governor ===
Incumbent Vice Governor Jun Bacorro of Aksyon Demokratiko ran for governor of Marinduque.

Aksyon Demokratiko nominated provincial board member John Pelaez, who was defeated by provincial board member Lyn Angeles of PDP–Laban. Former provincial board member Reynaldo Salvacion (Alliance for Barangay Concerns) and Teodolfo Rejano (Independent) also ran for vice governor.

Candidate	Party	Votes	%
Lyn Angeles	PDP–Laban	42,112	34.51
Reynaldo Salvacion	Alliance for Barangay Concerns	34,930	28.62
Teodolfo Rejano	Independent	27,872	22.84
John Pelaez	Aksyon Demokratiko	17,116	14.03
Total		122,030	100.00
Total votes		140,674	–
Registered voters/turnout		161,538	87.08
PDP–Laban gain from Aksyon			
Source: Commission on Elections

=== Provincial Board ===
The Marinduque Provincial Board is composed of 11 board members, eight of whom are elected.

PDP–Laban won seven seats, maintaining its majority in the provincial board.

Party	Votes	%	Seats	+/–
PDP–Laban	182,642	50.73	7	+1
Aksyon Demokratiko	43,863	12.18	0	New
People's Reform Party	7,821	2.17	0	New
Alliance for Barangay Concerns	6,643	1.85	0	New
Nationalist People's Coalition	1,540	0.43	0	New
Independent	117,494	32.64	1	0
Total	360,003	100.00	8	0
Total votes	140,674	–		
Registered voters/turnout	161,538	87.08		

==== 1st district ====
Marinduque's 1st provincial district consists of the municipalities of Boac, Gasan and Mogpog. Four board members are elected from this provincial district.

11 candidates were included in the ballot.

Candidate	Party	Votes	%
Macky Caballes	PDP–Laban	31,617	15.35
Jojo Leva	PDP–Laban	26,839	13.03
Tres Mangcucang	PDP–Laban	24,923	12.10
Dindin Opis-Mercado	PDP–Laban	22,286	10.82
Omeng Seño	Independent	19,649	9.54
Gilbert Daquioag (incumbent)	Aksyon Demokratiko	19,436	9.44
Jiggy Aliño	Independent	16,701	8.11
Noel Nieva	Independent	15,399	7.48
Adolfo Lazo	Aksyon Demokratiko	14,388	6.99
Pedrito Nepomuceno	Independent	8,101	3.93
Ruben Tan	Alliance for Barangay Concerns	6,643	3.23
Total		205,982	100.00
Total votes		74,733	–
Registered voters/turnout		84,320	88.63
Source: Commission on Elections

==== 2nd district ====
Marinduque's 2nd provincial district consists of the municipalities of Buenavista, Santa Cruz and Torrijos. Five board members are elected from this provincial district.

Nine candidates were included in the ballot.

Candidate	Party	Votes	%
Mel Encabo (incumbent)	PDP–Laban	25,942	16.84
Mercy Rejano (incumbent)	PDP–Laban	25,896	16.81
Danny Red	Independent	25,521	16.57
Mael Lim (incumbent)	PDP–Laban	25,139	16.32
Buchi Rosales	Independent	24,344	15.81
Francisco Villar	Aksyon Demokratiko	10,039	6.52
Bong Raza	People's Reform Party	7,821	5.08
Preny Estrada	Independent	7,779	5.05
Arnel Garcia	Nationalist People's Coalition	1,540	1.00
Total		154,021	100.00
Total votes		65,941	–
Registered voters/turnout		77,218	85.40
Source: Commission on Elections

== Occidental Mindoro ==
=== Governor ===
Incumbent Governor of Occidental Mindoro Eduardo Gadiano of Pederalismo ng Dugong Dakilang Samahan ran for a second term.

Gadiano won re-election against representative Josephine Sato (Liberal Party) and Adrian Gatdula (Independent).

Candidate	Party	Votes	%
Eduardo Gadiano (incumbent)	Pederalismo ng Dugong Dakilang Samahan	150,804	61.60
Josephine Sato	Liberal Party	92,208	37.67
Adrian Gatdula	Independent	1,781	0.73
Total		244,793	100.00
Total votes		263,453	–
Registered voters/turnout		313,427	84.06
PDDS hold			
Source: Commission on Elections

=== Vice Governor ===
Term-limited incumbent Peter Alfaro of PDP–Laban ran for the House of Representatives in Occidental Mindoro's lone legislative district.

Provincial board member Diana Apigo-Tayag (Pederalismo ng Dugong Dakilang Samahan) won the election against Abra de Ilog mayor Eric Constantino (Liberal Party).

Candidate	Party	Votes	%
Diana Apigo-Tayag	Pederalismo ng Dugong Dakilang Samahan	142,152	63.26
Eric Constantino	Liberal Party	82,576	36.74
Total		224,728	100.00
Total votes		263,453	–
Registered voters/turnout		313,427	84.06
PDDS gain from PDP–Laban			
Source: Commission on Elections

=== Provincial Board ===
The Occidental Mindoro Provincial Board is composed of 14 board members, 10 of whom are elected.

The Pederalismo ng Dugong Dakilang Samahan won five seats, becoming the largest party in the provincial board.

Party	Votes	%	Seats	+/–
Liberal Party	338,048	37.49	3	–4
Pederalismo ng Dugong Dakilang Samahan	308,305	34.20	5	+4
Lakas–CMD	64,165	7.12	1	New
Nacionalista Party	37,587	4.17	1	0
Partido para sa Demokratikong Reporma	36,710	4.07	0	New
PDP–Laban	32,018	3.55	0	0
Nationalist People's Coalition	21,818	2.42	0	New
Partido Pederal ng Maharlika	11,666	1.29	0	New
Independent	51,291	5.69	0	0
Total	901,608	100.00	10	0
Total votes	263,453	–		
Registered voters/turnout	313,427	84.06		

==== 1st district ====
Occidental Mindoro's 1st provincial district consists of the municipalities of Abra de Ilog, Looc, Lubang, Mamburao, Paluan, Sablayan and Santa Cruz. Five board members are elected from this provincial district.

13 candidates were included in the ballot.

Candidate	Party	Votes	%
AJ Rebong (incumbent)	Liberal Party	59,318	12.69
Jun Tejoso	Liberal Party	51,347	10.98
Ryan Sioson	Pederalismo ng Dugong Dakilang Samahan	48,890	10.46
E-K Almero	Liberal Party	47,642	10.19
Mangyan Masangkay	Pederalismo ng Dugong Dakilang Samahan	45,056	9.64
Obet Dawates	Pederalismo ng Dugong Dakilang Samahan	44,909	9.60
Jun Abeleda (incumbent)	Liberal Party	39,395	8.42
Arjay Zoleta	Liberal Party	37,347	7.99
Gilberto Tria Jr.	Independent	27,443	5.87
Florefe Chua	Pederalismo ng Dugong Dakilang Samahan	19,967	4.27
Ferdinand Tria	Lakas–CMD	18,539	3.96
Ronie Alegria	Partido para sa Demokratikong Reporma	17,431	3.73
Lloyd Peter Tajonera	PDP–Laban	10,319	2.21
Total		467,603	100.00
Total votes		135,534	–
Registered voters/turnout		160,406	84.49
Source: Commission on Elections

==== 2nd district ====
Occidental Mindoro's 2nd provincial district consists of the municipalities of Calintaan, Magsaysay, Rizal and San Jose. Five board members are elected from this provincial district.

21 candidates were included in the ballot.

Candidate	Party	Votes	%
Coco Mendiola	Pederalismo ng Dugong Dakilang Samahan	56,425	13.00
Kendi Villaroza	Lakas–CMD	45,626	10.51
Uly Javier	Nacionalista Party	37,587	8.66
Alex del Valle	Pederalismo ng Dugong Dakilang Samahan	36,225	8.35
Nathaniel Cruz	Pederalismo ng Dugong Dakilang Samahan	35,685	8.22
Michael Rogas	Liberal Party	34,076	7.85
Bing Bong Garcia	Liberal Party	27,351	6.30
Roy Balleza	Liberal Party	23,485	5.41
Ramon Quilit	Pederalismo ng Dugong Dakilang Samahan	21,148	4.87
Dominador Jaravata Jr.	Independent	19,582	4.51
Jake Balagot	Partido para sa Demokratikong Reporma	19,279	4.44
Boy Dimaano	Liberal Party	18,087	4.17
Baldo Melgar	Nationalist People's Coalition	17,677	4.07
Macky dela Cruz	Partido Pederal ng Maharlika	11,666	2.69
Rolando Basilio	PDP–Laban	7,141	1.65
Mario Argel	PDP–Laban	5,947	1.37
Joe Vidal	PDP–Laban	5,157	1.19
Mark Joseph Morales	Nationalist People's Coalition	4,141	0.95
Santi Reyes	PDP–Laban	3,454	0.80
Doming de Guzman	Independent	2,570	0.59
Lio Sandoval	Independent	1,696	0.39
Total		434,005	100.00
Total votes		127,919	–
Registered voters/turnout		153,021	83.60
Source: Commission on Elections

== Oriental Mindoro ==
=== Governor ===
Incumbent Governor Humerlito Dolor of PDP–Laban ran for a second term.

Dolor won re-election against representative Paulino Salvador Leachon (Mindoro Bago Sarili) and Jerry Casao (Independent).

Candidate	Party	Votes	%
Humerlito Dolor (incumbent)	PDP–Laban	255,696	58.25
Paulino Salvador Leachon	Mindoro Bago Sarili	182,201	41.51
Jerry Casao	Independent	1,088	0.25
Total		438,985	100.00
Total votes		464,438	–
Registered voters/turnout		564,128	82.33
PDP–Laban hold			
Source: Commission on Elections

=== Vice Governor ===
Incumbent Vice Governor Jojo Perez of Mindoro Bago Sarili ran for a second term. He was previously affiliated with PDP–Laban.

Perez was defeated by actor Ejay Falcon of PDP–Laban.

Candidate	Party	Votes	%
Ejay Falcon	PDP–Laban	226,875	54.99
Jojo Perez (incumbent)	Mindoro Bago Sarili	185,663	45.01
Total		412,538	100.00
Total votes		464,438	–
Registered voters/turnout		564,128	82.33
PDP–Laban gain from MBS			
Source: Commission on Elections

=== Provincial Board ===
The Oriental Mindoro Provincial Board is composed of 13 board members, 10 of whom are elected.

Mindoro Bago Sarili won five seats, becoming the largest party in the provincial board.

Party	Votes	%	Seats	+/–
PDP–Laban	699,129	43.36	3	–1
Mindoro Bago Sarili	593,593	36.81	5	New
Liberal Party	228,302	14.16	1	–3
Partido Federal ng Pilipinas	78,146	4.85	1	–1
Independent	13,259	0.82	0	0
Total	1,612,429	100.00	10	0
Total votes	464,438	–		
Registered voters/turnout	564,128	82.33		

==== 1st district ====
Oriental Mindoro's 1st provincial district consists of the same area as Oriental Mindoro's 1st legislative district. Five board members are elected from this provincial district.

12 candidates were included in the ballot.

Candidate	Party	Votes	%
Bong Brucal (incumbent)	Mindoro Bago Sarili	126,405	14.61
Alely Casubuan (incumbent)	Mindoro Bago Sarili	111,078	12.84
Fay Ilano	PDP–Laban	105,767	12.23
Edel Ilano (incumbent)	Mindoro Bago Sarili	96,307	11.13
Jocy Neria	Mindoro Bago Sarili	92,560	10.70
Ralph Rojas	PDP–Laban	80,822	9.34
Miko Atienza	PDP–Laban	79,446	9.18
Mikan Leachon (incumbent)	Mindoro Bago Sarili	79,300	9.17
Ruel Quinzon	PDP–Laban	42,339	4.89
Meth Jimenez	PDP–Laban	37,743	4.36
Richard Familaran	Independent	6,756	0.78
Emman Agutaya	Independent	6,503	0.75
Total		865,026	100.00
Total votes		256,084	–
Registered voters/turnout		312,393	81.97
Source: Commission on Elections

==== 2nd district ====
Oriental Mindoro's 2nd provincial district consists of the same area as Oriental Mindoro's 2nd legislative district. Five board members are elected from this provincial district.

10 candidates were included in the ballot.

Candidate	Party	Votes	%
Roland Ruga	PDP–Laban	95,401	12.76
Lito Camo (incumbent)	Liberal Party	91,593	12.25
Juday Servando (incumbent)	Mindoro Bago Sarili	87,943	11.77
Jom Dimapilis	PDP–Laban	85,664	11.46
Pau Umali	Partido Federal ng Pilipinas	78,146	10.46
Manny Buenaventura (incumbent)	Liberal Party	70,716	9.46
Bolet Dimapilis	Liberal Party	65,993	8.83
Butch Soller	PDP–Laban	60,303	8.07
Rodel Vaygan	PDP–Laban	57,662	7.71
Ysai Papasin	PDP–Laban	53,982	7.22
Total		747,403	100.00
Total votes		208,354	–
Registered voters/turnout		251,735	82.77
Source: Commission on Elections

== Palawan ==
=== Governor ===
Term-limited incumbent Governor Jose Alvarez of PDP–Laban ran for the House of Representatives in Palawan's 2nd legislative district.

Palawan vice governor Victorino Dennis Socrates (Partidong Pagbabago ng Palawan) won the election against former Palawan governor Mario Joel Reyes (Independent), former representative Frederick Abueg (Independent), former Palawan vice governor Art Ventura (Independent) and two other candidates.

Candidate	Party	Votes	%
Victorino Dennis Socrates	Partidong Pagbabago ng Palawan	190,391	45.31
Mario Joel Reyes	Independent	147,919	35.20
Frederick Abueg	Independent	64,732	15.41
Art Ventura	Independent	9,795	2.33
Agapito Salido Jr.	Partido Pilipino sa Pagbabago	4,915	1.17
Richard Lopez	Independent	2,445	0.58
Total		420,197	100.00
Total votes		489,388	–
Registered voters/turnout		581,797	84.12
PPPL gain from PDP–Laban			
Source: Commission on Elections

=== Vice Governor ===
Term-limited incumbent Vice Governor Victorino Dennis Socrates of the Partidong Pagbabago ng Palawan (PPPL) ran for governor of Palawan.

The PPPL nominated provincial board member Onsoy Ola, who won the election against former provincial board member Boy Bonoan (Reform Party), provincial board member Bon Ponce de Leon (Independent) and two other candidates.

Candidate	Party	Votes	%
Onsoy Ola	Partidong Pagbabago ng Palawan	230,003	57.38
Boy Bonoan	Reform Party	84,474	21.07
Bon Ponce de Leon	Independent	68,940	17.20
Jaime Josol	Independent	9,046	2.26
Mariano Parangue	Partido Pilipino sa Pagbabago	8,397	2.09
Total		400,860	100.00
Total votes		489,388	–
Registered voters/turnout		581,797	84.12
PPPL hold			
Source: Commission on Elections

=== Provincial Board ===
The Palawan Provincial Board is composed of 14 board members, 10 of whom are elected.

The Partidong Pagbabago ng Palawan remained as the largest party in the provincial board with three seats.

Party	Votes	%	Seats	+/–
Partidong Pagbabago ng Palawan	207,082	15.73	3	–4
PDP–Laban	198,116	15.05	2	0
Partido Pilipino sa Pagbabago	133,875	10.17	0	New
People's Reform Party	127,408	9.68	1	New
Partido Federal ng Pilipinas	103,827	7.89	0	New
National Unity Party	99,874	7.59	1	0
Lakas–CMD	87,883	6.68	1	New
Aksyon Demokratiko	82,100	6.24	2	New
Pederalismo ng Dugong Dakilang Samahan	31,926	2.42	0	0
Reform Party	11,549	0.88	0	New
Independent	232,937	17.69	0	0
Total	1,316,577	100.00	10	0
Total votes	489,388	–		
Registered voters/turnout	581,797	84.12		

==== 1st district ====
Palawan's 1st provincial district consists of the same area as Palawan's 1st legislative district. Five board members are elected from this provincial district.

24 candidates were included in the ballot.

Candidate	Party	Votes	%
Anton Alvarez (incumbent)	National Unity Party	99,874	12.93
Toto Pineda	PDP–Laban	76,559	9.91
Winston Arzaga	PDP–Laban	75,323	9.75
Maria Angela Sabando (incumbent)	Partidong Pagbabago ng Palawan	75,203	9.73
Nieves Rosento	People's Reform Party	60,744	7.86
Julius Ceasar Fortes	PDP–Laban	46,234	5.98
Yuri Palanca	Partido Federal ng Pilipinas	42,941	5.56
Naty Gabriel	People's Reform Party	34,623	4.48
Tangay Caralipio	People's Reform Party	32,041	4.15
Monching Zabala	Pederalismo ng Dugong Dakilang Samahan	31,926	4.13
Jun Mones	Independent	30,521	3.95
Ed Trinidad	Independent	29,294	3.79
Sotero Alarcon	Independent	23,490	3.04
Daniel Latube	Partido Pilipino sa Pagbabago	20,261	2.62
Victor Pablico	Partido Pilipino sa Pagbabago	18,276	2.37
Enrico Cabiguen	Partido Pilipino sa Pagbabago	11,642	1.51
Robert James Lagan	Reform Party	11,549	1.49
Nanette Trampe	Independent	10,023	1.30
Michelle Fox	Independent	9,607	1.24
Romel Condesa	Independent	8,877	1.15
Jon Tumampil	Independent	7,617	0.99
David Dweine Dalag	Partido Pilipino sa Pagbabago	6,320	0.82
Val Derek Miguel	Partido Pilipino sa Pagbabago	5,234	0.68
Ed Katon	Independent	4,425	0.57
Total		772,604	100.00
Total votes		250,217	–
Registered voters/turnout		292,031	85.68
Source: Commission on Elections

==== 2nd district ====
Palawan's 2nd provincial district consists of the same area as Palawan's 2nd legislative district. Four board members are elected from this provincial district.

17 candidates were included in the ballot.

Candidate	Party	Votes	%
Ryan Maminta (incumbent)	Lakas–CMD	87,883	16.72
Al Ibba	Partidong Pagbabago ng Palawan	76,654	14.58
Marivic Roxas	Aksyon Demokratiko	69,012	13.13
Aris Arzaga	Partidong Pagbabago ng Palawan	55,225	10.51
Nelson Gabayan	Independent	40,149	7.64
Jun Servando	Partido Pilipino sa Pagbabago	34,522	6.57
Ton Abengoza	Partido Pilipino sa Pagbabago	23,919	4.55
Mau Adonis	Partido Federal ng Pilipinas	21,266	4.05
Carlito Leoncio	Partido Federal ng Pilipinas	21,135	4.02
Kitten Gomez-Remollo	Partido Federal ng Pilipinas	18,485	3.52
Alanben Rodriguez	Independent	16,727	3.18
Myra Bacosa-Narrazid	Independent	14,887	2.83
Chito dela Chica	Independent	11,168	2.12
Hajan Said	Partido Pilipino sa Pagbabago	10,829	2.06
Elmer Gregorio	Independent	10,187	1.94
Arnel Relox	Independent	7,610	1.45
Andrew Pe	Independent	5,943	1.13
Total		525,601	100.00
Total votes		215,762	–
Registered voters/turnout		260,323	82.88
Source: Commission on Elections

==== 3rd district ====
Palawan's 3rd provincial district consists of the municipality of Aborlan. One board member is elected from this provincial district.

Three candidates were included in the ballot.

Candidate	Party	Votes	%
Jun Ortega	Aksyon Demokratiko	13,088	71.24
Jaime Manalo	Partido Pilipino sa Pagbabago	2,872	15.63
Kors Badilla	Independent	2,412	13.13
Total		18,372	100.00
Total votes		23,409	–
Registered voters/turnout		29,443	79.51
Source: Commission on Elections

== Puerto Princesa ==
=== Mayor ===
Incumbent Mayor Lucilo Bayron of PDP–Laban ran for a second term.

Bayron won re-election against city councilor Jimbo Maristela (Liberal Party) and seven other candidates.

Candidate	Party	Votes	%
Lucilo Bayron (incumbent)	PDP–Laban	73,047	56.55
Jimbo Maristela	Liberal Party	48,669	37.68
Florante Antazo	Independent	3,393	2.63
Romeo Nuñez	Independent	1,895	1.47
Dante Diaz	Independent	861	0.67
Noli Aydalia	Independent	468	0.36
Edgardo Martinez	Independent	356	0.28
Daniel Pedoy	Independent	298	0.23
Eliceo Oloroso	Independent	176	0.14
Total		129,163	100.00
Total votes		136,547	–
Registered voters/turnout		164,590	82.96
PDP–Laban hold			
Source: Commission on Elections

=== Vice Mayor ===
Incumbent Vice Mayor Nancy Socrates of Aksyon Demokratiko ran for a second term. She was previously affiliated with PDP–Laban.

Socrates won re-election against former city councilor Gerry Abordo (Reform Party).

Candidate	Party	Votes	%
Nancy Socrates (incumbent)	Aksyon Demokratiko	90,979	80.44
Gerry Abordo	Reform Party	22,119	19.56
Total		113,098	100.00
Total votes		136,547	–
Registered voters/turnout		164,590	82.96
Aksyon hold			
Source: Commission on Elections

=== City Council ===
The Puerto Princesa City Council is composed of 13 councilors, 10 of whom are elected.

40 candidates were included in the ballot.

PDP–Laban won nine seats, gaining a majority in the city council.

Party	Votes	%	Seats	+/–
PDP–Laban	498,835	51.36	9	+5
Liberal Party	136,141	14.02	0	New
Pederalismo ng Dugong Dakilang Samahan	29,222	3.01	0	–1
Partido Pilipino sa Pagbabago	11,725	1.21	0	New
Independent	295,246	30.40	1	+1
Total	971,169	100.00	10	0
Total votes	136,547	–		
Registered voters/turnout	164,590	82.96		

Candidate	Party	Votes	%
Patrick Hagedorn (incumbent)	PDP–Laban	79,638	8.20
Raine Bayron	PDP–Laban	66,484	6.85
Luis Marcaida III	Independent	53,943	5.55
Feliboy Oliveros	PDP–Laban	53,626	5.52
Elgin Robert Damasco (incumbent)	PDP–Laban	51,370	5.29
Jimmy Carbonell (incumbent)	PDP–Laban	51,326	5.28
Jonjie Rodriguez	PDP–Laban	47,968	4.94
Herbert Dilig (incumbent)	PDP–Laban	45,990	4.74
Nesario Awat (incumbent)	PDP–Laban	44,478	4.58
Henry Gadiano (incumbent)	PDP–Laban	37,780	3.89
Gerry Abad	Independent	31,352	3.23
Cocoy Gabuco	Independent	31,211	3.21
Niko Tan	Independent	30,912	3.18
Mong Sayang	Independent	30,746	3.17
Jimmy Cañete	Liberal Party	29,526	3.04
Oliver Miguel Reynoso	Pederalismo ng Dugong Dakilang Samahan	29,222	3.01
Rodel Yara	Independent	25,143	2.59
Jocelyn Serna	Independent	24,599	2.53
Tony Romasanta	Independent	22,232	2.29
Jean Lou Aguilar	Liberal Party	20,835	2.15
Cesar Javarez	Liberal Party	20,458	2.11
Rogelio Castro	PDP–Laban	20,175	2.08
Arnold Biton	Liberal Party	15,784	1.63
Jie Lao	Independent	15,192	1.56
Barry Sumpio	Liberal Party	14,403	1.48
Lyka Añasco	Liberal Party	12,888	1.33
Louchie Palanca	Liberal Party	11,415	1.18
Ching Cuyos-Escalona	Liberal Party	10,832	1.12
Francisco Castro	Independent	6,934	0.71
Felipe Tong	Independent	6,581	0.68
Delson Gaspar	Partido Pilipino sa Pagbabago	5,629	0.58
Hasta Dadi Fuertes	Independent	4,946	0.51
Gabriel Bonete	Partido Pilipino sa Pagbabago	4,509	0.46
Nenelia Aguirre	Independent	3,980	0.41
Renante Paigma	Independent	2,226	0.23
Ronald Romulo	Independent	2,220	0.23
Kap Balingit	Partido Pilipino sa Pagbabago	1,587	0.16
Alouddin Gerardo	Independent	1,067	0.11
Randolf Fantone	Independent	984	0.10
Emmanuel Oczon	Independent	978	0.10
Total		971,169	100.00
Total votes		136,547	–
Registered voters/turnout		164,590	82.96
Source: Commission on Elections

== Romblon ==
=== Governor ===
Incumbent Governor Jose Riano of PDP–Laban ran for a second term.

Riano won re-election against former Romblon governor Eduardo Firmalo (Liberal Party).

Candidate	Party	Votes	%
Jose Riano (incumbent)	PDP–Laban	94,513	59.25
Eduardo Firmalo	Liberal Party	65,016	40.75
Total		159,529	100.00
Total votes		176,195	–
Registered voters/turnout		206,119	85.48
PDP–Laban hold			
Source: Commission on Elections

=== Vice Governor ===
Incumbent Vice Governor Dongdong Ylagan of Aksyon Demokratiko ran for a second term.

Ylagan was defeated by former provincial board member Arming Gutierrez of PDP–Laban.

Candidate	Party	Votes	%
Arming Gutierrez (incumbent)	PDP–Laban	76,102	50.95
Dongdong Ylagan	Aksyon Demokratiko	73,266	49.05
Total		149,368	100.00
Total votes		176,195	–
Registered voters/turnout		206,119	85.48
PDP–Laban gain from Aksyon			
Source: Commission on Elections

=== Provincial Board ===
The Romblon Provincial Board consists of 11 board members, eight of whom are elected.

The Nacionalista Party remained as the largest party in the provincial board with five seats, but lost its majority.

Party	Votes	%	Seats	+/–
Nacionalista Party	200,846	44.98	5	–1
PDP–Laban	104,733	23.45	3	+3
Liberal Party	88,290	19.77	0	–2
Aksyon Demokratiko	52,671	11.80	0	New
Total	446,540	100.00	8	0
Total votes	176,195	–		
Registered voters/turnout	206,119	85.48		

==== 1st district ====
Romblon's 1st provincial district consists of the municipalities of Banton, Concepcion, Corcuera, San Fernando, Magdiwang, Cajidiocan, Romblon and San Agustin. Four board members are elected from this provincial district.

Eight candidates were included in the ballot.

Candidate	Party	Votes	%
Jun Bernardo (incumbent)	PDP–Laban	40,235	19.53
Nene Solis	Nacionalista Party	39,081	18.97
Rachel Bañares (incumbent)	Nacionalista Party	37,005	17.96
Guds Mortel (incumbent)	PDP–Laban	31,127	15.11
Dindo Rios	Aksyon Demokratiko	24,997	12.13
Linda Mingoa	Liberal Party	12,689	6.16
Ken Festin	Liberal Party	11,159	5.42
William Mazo	Liberal Party	9,759	4.74
Total		206,052	100.00
Total votes		82,400	–
Registered voters/turnout		96,975	84.97
Source: Commission on Elections

==== 2nd district ====
Romblon's 2nd provincial district consists of the municipalities of Alcantara, Ferrol, Looc, Odiongan, San Andres, San Jose, Calatrava, Santa Fe, and Santa Maria. Four board members are elected from this provincial district.

Eight candidates were included in the ballot.

Candidate	Party	Votes	%
Jojo Beltran	Nacionalista Party	45,042	18.73
Boy Maravilla	Nacionalista Party	40,039	16.65
Fred Dorado (incumbent)	Nacionalista Party	39,679	16.50
Bing Solis (incumbent)	PDP–Laban	33,371	13.88
Jose Madrid (incumbent)	Aksyon Demokratiko	27,674	11.51
Tony Macalisang	Liberal Party	20,482	8.52
Wilson Fortaleza	Liberal Party	19,527	8.12
Romy Faeldan	Liberal Party	14,674	6.10
Total		240,488	100.00
Total votes		93,795	–
Registered voters/turnout		109,144	85.94
Source: Commission on Elections
