= 2022 Oriental Mindoro local elections =

Local elections in the Philippines

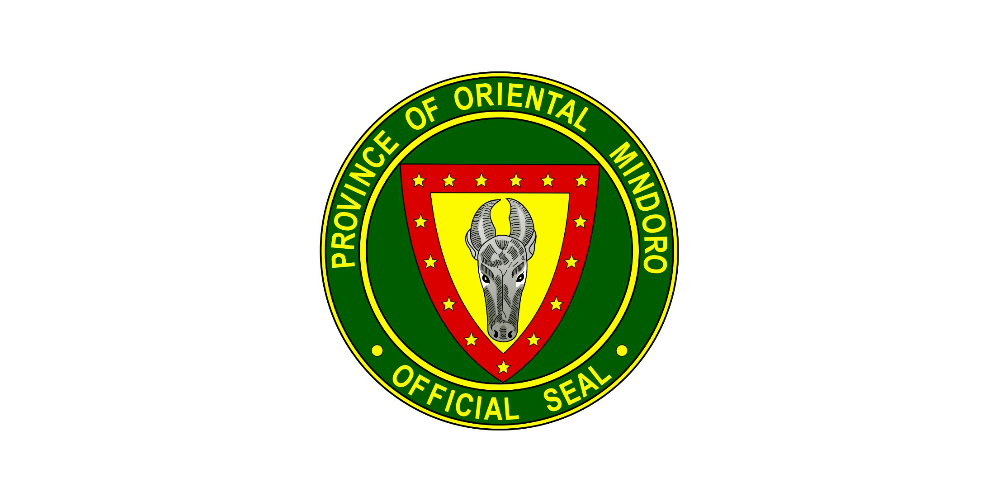
- May 9, 2022
- Registered: 564,128
- Turnout: 464,438
- 2022 Oriental Mindoro gubernatorial election
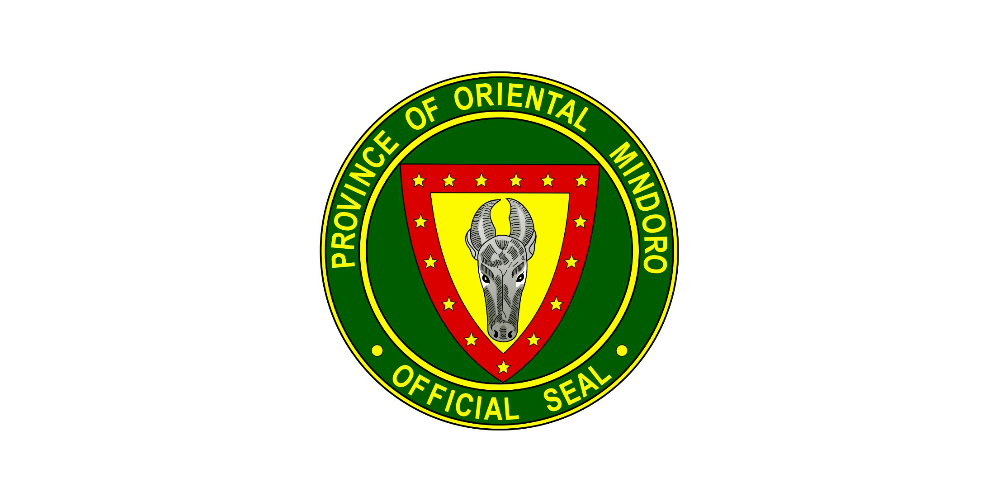
- May 9, 2022
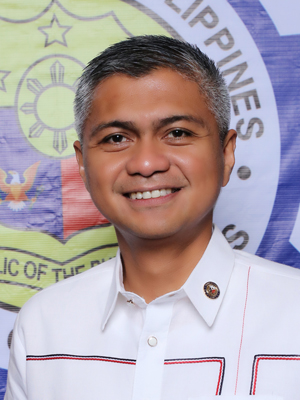

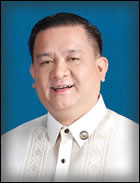
Candidate	Humerlito Dolor	Doy Leachon
Party	PDP–Laban	MBS
Running mate	Ejay Falcon	Jojo Perez
Popular vote	255,696	182,201
Percentage	58.24%	41.50%
Governor before election
Humerlito Dolor
PDP–Laban
Elected Governor
Humerlito Dolor
PDP–Laban
- 2022 Oriental Mindoro vice gubernatorial election
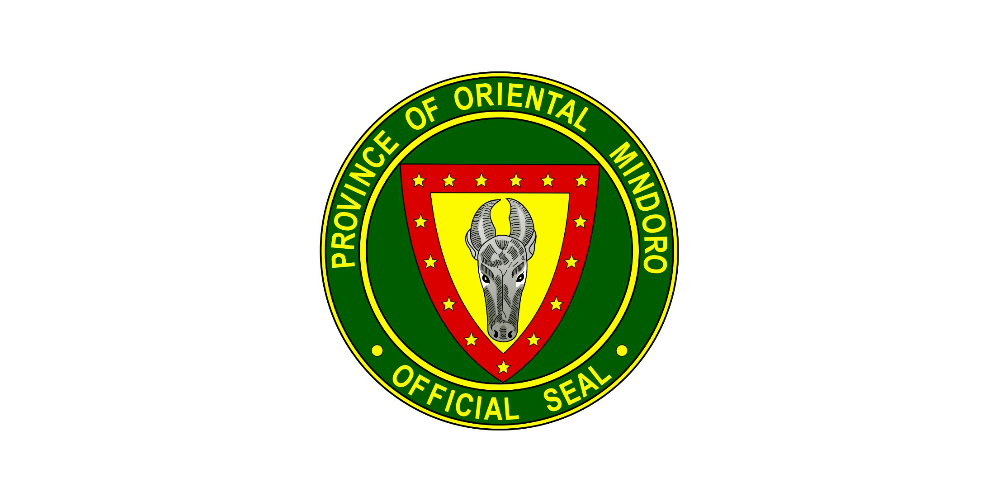
- May 9, 2022
	PDP	MBS
Candidate	Ejay Falcon	Jojo Perez
Party	PDP–Laban	MBS
Popular vote	226,875	185,663
Percentage	54.99%	45.00%
Vice-Governor before election
Antonio Perez Jr.
PDP–Laban
Elected Vice-Governor
Ejay Falcon
PDP–Laban

Local elections were held in Oriental Mindoro on May 9, 2022 as part of the 2022 Philippine general election. Voters will select candidates for all local positions: a town mayor, vice mayor, and town councilors, as well as members of the Sangguniang Panlalawigan, a vice-governor, a governor, and representatives for the province's two congressional districts in the Philippine House of Representatives.

== Results ==
=== Governor ===
Oriental Mindoro Gubernatorial Election
Party	Candidate	Votes	%
PDP–Laban	Humerlito Dolor	255,696	58.24
MBS	Doy Leachon	182,201	41.50
Independent	Jerry Casao	1,088	0.24
Total votes		438,985	100
PDP–Laban hold			

==== By city/municipality ====
City/Municipality	Humerlito Dolor		Paulino Salvador Leachon		Jerry Casao	
City/Municipality	Votes	%	Votes	%	Votes	%
Baco	10,865	54.86	8,879	44.83	62	0.31
Bansud	11,057	54.11	9,330	45.66	48	0.23
Bongabong	22,663	64.01	12,628	35.67	115	0.32
Bulalacao	12,347	61.95	7,540	37.83	42	0.21
Calapan	34,551	44.55	42,739	55.11	257	0.33
Gloria	15,269	59.76	10,233	40.05	48	0.19
Mansalay	14,706	61.09	9,316	38.70	52	0.22
Naujan	32,761	64.46	17,974	35.36	92	0.18
Pinamalayan	26,752	66.19	13,563	33.56	100	0.25
Pola	10,409	57.44	7,677	42.37	34	0.19
Puerto Galera	8,235	38.89	12,889	60.86	53	0.25
Roxas	22,830	74.84	7,615	24.96	59	0.19
San Teodoro	5,196	56.17	4,037	43.64	18	0.19
Socorro	12,460	62.24	7,512	37.52	48	0.24
Victoria	15,595	60.16	10,269	39.61	60	0.23
TOTAL	255,696	58.24	182,201	41.50	1,088	0.24

=== Vice governor ===
Oriental Mindoro Vice Gubernatorial Election
Party	Candidate	Votes	%
PDP–Laban	Ejay Falcon	226,875	54.99
MBS	Antonio Perez Jr.	185,663	45.00
Total votes		412,538	100
PDP–Laban gain from MBS			

==== Per City/Municipality ====
City/Municipality	Ejay Falcon		Antonio Perez Jr.	
City/Municipality	Votes	%	Votes	%
Baco	9,867	53.74	8,492	46.26
Bansud	8,721	46.09	10,202	53.91
Bongabong	18,505	56.19	14,428	43.81
Bulalacao	9,594	54.23	8,098	45.77
Calapan	39,074	52.31	35,619	47.69
Gloria	12,916	52.92	11,489	47.08
Mansalay	10,503	48.49	11,155	51.51
Naujan	28,711	59.84	19,267	40.16
Pinamalayan	23,590	61.13	14,999	38.87
Pola	10,630	62.59	6,353	37.41
Puerto Galera	7,594	38.99	11,881	61.01
Roxas	18,198	62.49	10,922	37.51
San Teodoro	4,616	55.67	3,676	44.33
Socorro	10,824	57.36	8,045	42.64
Victoria	13,532	55.08	11,037	44.92
TOTAL	226,875	54.99	185,663	45.00

=== Congressional Districts ===
==== 1st District ====
Philippine House of Representatives Election at Oriental Mindoro's 1st District
Party	Candidate	Votes	%
MBS	Arnan Panaligan	142,095	61.34
PDP–Laban	Mark Marcos	87,666	37.84
Independent	Alvaro Eduardo	1,879	0.81
Total votes		231,640	100
MBS gain from PDP–Laban			

==== 2nd District ====
Philippine House of Representatives Election at Oriental Mindoro's 2nd District
Party	Candidate	Votes	%
Liberal	Alfonso Umali Jr.	82,761	44.45
PDP–Laban	Joanna Valencia	62,194	33.41
Aksyon	Anthony Yap	39,761	21.35
Independent	Mario Florencondia	1,437	0.77
Total votes		186,153	100
Liberal hold			

=== Provincial Board ===
Party or alliance		Votes	%	Seats
Mindoro Bago Sarili	Mindoro Bago Sarili	593,593	36.81	5
Mindoro Bago Sarili	Liberal	228,302	14.16	1
Mindoro Bago Sarili	PFP	78,146	4.85	1
Mindoro Bago Sarili	Total	900,041	55.82	7
Partido Demokratiko Pilipino-Lakas ng Bayan		699,129	43.36	3
Independent		13,259	0.82	–
Ex officio seats				3
Total		1,612,429	100.00	13

==== 1st District ====
Oriental Mindoro Provincial Board Election at Oriental Mindoro's 1st District
Party	Candidate	Votes	%
MBS	Bong Brucal	126,405	14.61
MBS	Alely Casubuan	111,078	12.84
PDP–Laban	Fay Ilano	105,767	12.22
MBS	Edel Ilano	96,307	11.13
MBS	Jocy Neria	92,560	10.70
PDP–Laban	Ralph Rojas	80,822	9.34
PDP–Laban	Miko Atienza	79,446	9.18
MBS	Mikan Leachon	79,300	9.16
PDP–Laban	Ruel Quinzon	42,339	4.89
PDP–Laban	Meth Jimenez	37,743	4.36
Independent	Richard Familaran	6,756	0.78
Independent	Emman Agutaya	6,503	0.75
Total votes		865,026	100

==== 2nd District ====
Oriental Mindoro Provincial Board Election at Oriental Mindoro's 2nd District
Party	Candidate	Votes	%
PDP–Laban	Roland Ruga	95,401	12.76
Liberal	Lito Camo	91,593	12.25
MBS	Juday Servando	87,943	11.76
PDP–Laban	Jom Dimapilis	85,664	11.46
PFP	Pau Umali	78,146	10.45
Liberal	Manny Buenaventura	70,716	9.46
Liberal	Ate Bolet Dimapilis	65,993	8.82
PDP–Laban	Butch Soller	60,303	8.06
PDP–Laban	Rodel Vaygan	57,662	7.71
PDP–Laban	Ysai Papansin	53,982	7.22
Total votes		747,403	100

=== City and Municipal Election ===
==== 1st District ====
===== Baco =====
Baco Mayoral Election
Party	Candidate	Votes	%
Aksyon	Allan Roldan	7,516	36.37
MBS	Joseph Rey Marco	6,812	32.96
PDP–Laban	Eric Castillo	6,340	30.68
Total votes		20,668	100.00

Baco Vice Mayoral Election
Party	Candidate	Votes	%
MBS	Reynaldo Marco	9,984	49.93
PDP–Laban	Naylene Bautista	6,759	33.80
Aksyon	Ariel Villas	3,252	16.26
Total votes		19,995	100.00

===== Calapan =====
Calapan Mayoral Election
Party	Candidate	Votes	%
Aksyon	Malou Morillo	36,452	46.54
MBS	Gil Ramirez	29,824	38.08
PDP–Laban	Gilbert Repizo	12,040	15.37
Total votes		78,316	100.00

Calapan Vice Mayoral Election
Party	Candidate	Votes	%
Aksyon	Bim Ignacio	36,722	48.20
MBS	Rap Infantado	25,207	33.09
PDP–Laban	Mylene De Jesus	14,255	18.71
Total votes		76,184	100.00

===== Naujan =====
Naujan Mayoral Election
Party	Candidate	Votes	%
Aksyon	Henry Joel Teves	20,370	39.58
MBS	Admin Bobie Navarro	17,835	34.66
PDP–Laban	Marion Marcos	13,257	25.76
Total votes		51,462	100.00

Naujan Vice Mayoral Election
Party	Candidate	Votes	%
Reporma	Great Delos Reyes	16,543	33.74
PDP–Laban	Shey Morales	12,425	25.34
MBS	Ryan Arago	12,316	25.12
Aksyon	Jun Bugarin	7,754	15.81
Total votes		49,038	100.00

===== Pola =====
Pola Mayoral Election
Party	Candidate	Votes	%
NUP	Jennifer "Ina Alegre" Cruz	10,390	54.50
Aksyon	Alex Aranas	4,847	25.42
Liberal	Kuya Dodjie Panganiban	3,828	20.08
Total votes		19,065	100.00

Pola Vice Mayoral Election
Party	Candidate	Votes	%
PDP–Laban	Marvin Rivera	8,865	48.89
Independent	Anchie Villanueva	5,470	30.17
Liberal	Maria Ana Liza Montalbo	3,796	20.94
Total votes		18,131	100.00

===== Puerto Galera =====
Puerto Galera Mayoral Election
Party	Candidate	Votes	%
MBS	Rocky Ilagan	17,203	79.87
PDP–Laban	Joanna Mae Arago	4,335	20.13
Total votes		21,538	100.00

Puerto Galera Vice Mayoral Election
Party	Candidate	Votes	%
MBS	Marlon Lopez	12,728	60.11
PDP–Laban	Aris Atienza	7,583	35.81
Aksyon	Victorino Atienza	816	3.85
Independent	Puto Caubalejo	47	0.22
Total votes		21,174	100.00

===== San Teodoro =====
San Teodoro Mayoral Election
Party	Candidate	Votes	%
MBS	Boyet Py	5,929	63.09
PDP–Laban	Manuel Bae	3,468	36.91
Total votes		9,397	100.00

San Teodoro Vice Mayoral Election
Party	Candidate	Votes	%
PDP–Laban	Newton John Moreno	5,002	55.16
MBS	Hector Arenillo	3,659	40.35
Independent	Renz Barcebal	407	4.49
Total votes		9,068	100.00

===== Socorro =====
Socorro Mayoral Election
Party	Candidate	Votes	%
Aksyon	Nemmen Perez	8,457	41.42
PDP–Laban	Bubut Brondial	7,767	38.04
MBS	Rolly Arreola	4,194	20.54
Total votes		20,418	100.00

Socorro Vice Mayoral Election
Party	Candidate	Votes	%
PDP–Laban	Roy De Claro	9,824	51.92
MBS	Allan Kenneth Tolentino	9,096	48.08
Total votes		18,920	100.00

===== Victoria =====
Victoria Mayoral Election
Party	Candidate	Votes	%
PDP–Laban	Lito Malabanan	20,701	81.36
Independent	Andy Magnaye	4,743	18.64
Total votes		25,444	100.00

Victoria Vice Mayoral Election
Party	Candidate	Votes	%
MBS	Marlo Nuarin	11,645	45.87
PDP–Laban	Dhey Gasic	8,512	33.53
Aksyon	Chester Dumas	5,232	20.61
Total votes		25,389	100.00

==== 2nd District ====
===== Bansud =====
Bansud Mayoral Election
Party	Candidate	Votes	%
MBS	Ronaldo Morada	15,249	71.97
PDP–Laban	Hope Saulong	5,938	28.03
Total votes		21,187	100.00

Bansud Vice Mayoral Election
Party	Candidate	Votes	%
MBS	Rico Tolentino	11,987	59.57
PDP–Laban	Ness Bautista	8,135	40.43
Total votes		20,122	100.00

===== Bongabong =====
Bongabong Mayoral Election
Party	Candidate	Votes	%
MBS	Elgin Malaluan	26,241	78.12
Independent	Gerry Liwanag	7,349	21.88
Total votes		33,590	100.00

Bongabong Vice Mayoral Election
Party	Candidate	Votes	%
MBS	Richard Candelario	27,658	100.00
Total votes		27,658	100.00

===== Bulalacao =====
Bulalacao Mayoral Election
Party	Candidate	Votes	%
PDP–Laban	Ernilo Villas	13,496	66.47
Aksyon	Jerald Salas	6,808	33.53
Total votes		20,304	100.00

Bulalacao Vice Mayoral Election
Party	Candidate	Votes	%
PDP–Laban	Ramon Magbanua	14,465	100.00
Total votes		14,465	100.00

===== Gloria =====
Gloria Mayoral Election
Party	Candidate	Votes	%
PFP	Bitoy Rodegerio	17,584	69.60
PDP–Laban	Jimmy De Castro	7,401	29.29
Aksyon	Rexner Rubio	279	1.10
Total votes		25,264	100.00

Gloria Vice Mayoral Election
Party	Candidate	Votes	%
PFP	Rambo Alvarez	13,931	54.15
PDP–Laban	Vic Ruskin Ong	11,798	45.85
Total votes		25,729	100.00

===== Mansalay =====
Mansalay Mayoral Election
Party	Candidate	Votes	%
MBS	Ferdinand Maliwanag	15,085	59.28
Independent	Ariel Go	10,361	40.72
Total votes		25,446	100.00

Mansalay Vice Mayoral Election
Party	Candidate	Votes	%
PDP–Laban	Shernan Gamol	12,549	51.47
Liberal	Lynette Postma	11,832	48.53
Total votes		24,381	100.00

===== Pinamalayan =====
Pinamalayan Mayoral Election
Party	Candidate	Votes	%
Liberal	Aris Baldos	34,232	100.00
Total votes		34,232	100.00

Pinamalayan Vice Mayoral Election
Party	Candidate	Votes	%
Liberal	Rodel Magsino	30,874	79.34
PDP–Laban	Bobby Morente	8,038	20.66
Total votes		38,912	100.00

===== Roxas =====
Roxas Vice Mayoral Election
Party	Candidate	Votes	%
PDP–Laban	Leo Cusi Sr.	18,599	60.14
Liberal	Dodoy Magno	12,326	39.86
Total votes		30,925	100.00

Roxas Vice Mayoral Election
Party	Candidate	Votes	%
PDP–Laban	Jerwin Dimapilis	17,065	56.08
Liberal	Den-Den Dela Cruz	13,367	43.92
Total votes		30,432	100.00
