= Frederick Abueg =

Filipino lawyer and politician (born 1974)

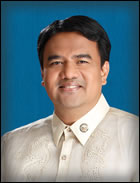
- Official portrait, 2013

Deputy Speaker of the House of Representatives of the Philippines
- In office September 13, 2016 – June 30, 2019
- Speaker: Pantaleon Alvarez; Gloria Macapagal Arroyo

Member of the Philippine House of Representatives for Palawan's 2nd district
- In office June 30, 2013 – June 30, 2019
- Preceded by: Victorino Dennis Socrates
- Succeeded by: Beng Abueg

Member of the Palawan Provincial Board from 2nd district
- In office June 30, 2010 – June 30, 2013

Personal details
- Born: Frederick Fabello Abueg; April 16, 1974 (age 52) Manila, Philippines
- Party: Liberal (2010–2016; 2024–present)
- Other political affiliations: Independent (2019–2024); PDP–Laban (2016–2019); PPP (2009–2013)
- Relatives: Alfredo Abueg Jr. (father); Beng Abueg (sister)
- Nickname: Erick

Frederick Fabello Abueg (born April 16, 1974) is a Filipino lawyer and politician who served as a member of the Philippine House of Representatives for Palawan's 2nd congressional district from 2013 to 2019. Currently a member of the Liberal Party, he previously served as House deputy speaker from 2016 to 2019, and as a member of the Palawan Provincial Board from 2010 to 2013.

After his congressional tenure, Abueg ran for governor of Palawan in 2022 and vice governor in 2025, but lost both bids.

He is the son of former representative Alfredo Abueg Jr.

== Electoral history ==
Electoral history of Frederick Abueg
Year	Office	Party		Votes received				Result
Year	Office	Local	National	Total	%	P.	Swing	Result
2010	Provincial Board Member (Palawan–2nd)	PPP	Liberal	47,809	9.64%	1st	—N/a	Won
2013	Representative (Palawan–2nd)	PPP	Liberal	57,485	50.03%	1st	—N/a	Won
2016	Representative (Palawan–2nd)	—N/a	Liberal	94,860	100.00%	1st	+49.97	Unopposed
2022	Governor of Palawan	—N/a	Independent	64,732	15.41%	3rd	—N/a	Lost
2025	Vice Governor of Palawan	—N/a	Liberal	149,453	35.77%	2nd	—N/a	Lost

House of Representatives of the Philippines
Preceded by Victorino Dennis Socrates	Member of the Philippine House of Representatives for Palawan's 2nd district 2013–2019	Succeeded by Beng Abueg
