= Oriental Mindoro Provincial Board =

Legislative body of the province of Oriental Mindoro, Philippines

Oriental Mindoro Provincial Board Sangguniang Panlalawigan ng Oriental Mindoro

Type
- Type: Unicameral
- Term limits: 3 terms (9 years)

Leadership
- Presiding Officer: Antonio S. Perez Jr., MBS since June 30, 2025

Structure
- Seats: 13 board members 1 ex officio presiding officer
- Political groups: GSM (5) MBS (2) PFP (2) Lakas (1) Nonpartisan (2)
- Length of term: 3 years
- Authority: Local Government Code of the Philippines

Elections
- Voting system: Multiple non-transferable vote (regular members); Indirect election (ex officio members)
- Last election: May 12, 2025
- Next election: May 15, 2028

Meeting place
- Oriental Mindoro Provincial Capitol, Calapan

The Oriental Mindoro Provincial Board is the Sangguniang Panlalawigan (provincial legislature) of the Philippine province of Oriental Mindoro.

The members are elected via plurality-at-large voting: the province is divided into two districts, each having five seats. A voter votes up to five names, with the top five candidates per district being elected. The vice governor is the ex officio presiding officer, and only votes to break ties. The vice governor is elected via the plurality voting system province-wide.

The districts used in appropriation of members is coextensive with the legislative districts of Oriental Mindoro.

Aside from the regular members, the board also includes the provincial federation presidents of the Liga ng mga Barangay (ABC, from its old name "Association of Barangay Captains"), the Sangguniang Kabataan (SK, youth councils) and the Philippine Councilors League (PCL).

== Apportionment ==
Elections	Seats per district		Ex officio seats	Total seats
Elections	1st	2nd	Ex officio seats	Total seats
2010–present	5	5	3	13

== List of members ==
=== Current members ===
These are the members after the 2025 local elections and 2023 barangay and SK elections:

- Vice Governor: Antonio S. Perez Jr. (MBS)

Seat	Board member	Party	Start of term	End of term
1st district	Carlos S. Brucal	MBS	June 30, 2019	June 30, 2028
1st district	Ronalee E. Leachon	MBS	June 30, 2025	June 30, 2028
1st district	Alexandra C. Casubuan	GSM	June 30, 2019	June 30, 2028
1st district	Farrah Fay C. Ilano-Navarro	GSM	June 30, 2022	June 30, 2028
1st district	Ryan Z. Arago	GSM	June 30, 2025	June 30, 2028
2nd district	Jean Paulo R. Umali	PFP	June 30, 2022	June 30, 2028
2nd district	Rolando H. Ruga	GSM	June 30, 2022	June 30, 2028
2nd district	Jomarc Philip E. Dimapilis	GSM	June 30, 2022	June 30, 2028
2nd district	Anthony L. Yap	Lakas	June 30, 2025	June 30, 2028
2nd district	Emmanuel S. Buenaventura	PFP	June 30, 2025	June 30, 2028
ABC	Dennis Brondial	Nonpartisan	July 30, 2018	January 1, 2023
PCL	Marion Francis Marcos	PDP–Laban	July 1, 2019	June 30, 2022
SK	Joeniña Aguilon	Nonpartisan	June 8, 2018	January 1, 2023

=== Vice governor ===
Election year	Name	Party	Ref.
2016	Humerlito Dolor	Liberal	
2019	Antonio S. Perez, Jr.	PDP–Laban	
2022	Ejay Falcon	PDP–Laban	
2025	Antonio S. Perez, Jr.	MBS	

=== 1st district ===
- Population (2024):

Election year	Member (party)	Member (party)	Member (party)	Member (party)	Member (party)	Ref.
2016	Antonio S. Perez, Jr. (NPC)	Edel Ilano (NPC)	Ryan Z. Arago (Liberal)	Rafael L. Infantado (Liberal)	Juan Paolo G. Luna (Liberal)	
2019	Carlos Voltaire S. Brucal (PDP–Laban)	Edel Ilano (PDP–Laban)	Alexandra C. Casubuan (PDP–Laban)	Rafael L. Infantado (Liberal)	Mikan Leachon (PDP–Laban)	
2022	Carlos Voltaire S. Brucal (MBS)	Edel Ilano (MBS)	Alexandra C. Casubuan (MBS)	Farrah Fay C. Ilano-Navarro (PDP–Laban)	Jocelyn U. Neria (MBS)	
2025	Carlos Voltaire S. Brucal (MBS)	Ronalee E. Leachon (MBS)	Alexandra C. Casubuan (GSM)	Farrah Fay C. Ilano-Navarro (GSM)	Ryan Z. Arago (GSM)	

=== 2nd district ===
- Population (2024):

Election year	Member (party)	Member (party)	Member (party)	Member (party)	Member (party)	Ref.
2016	Ramil O. Dimapilis (Liberal)	Flor D. Atienza (Liberal)	Jean Paolo R. Umali (Liberal)	Mae Arlene M. Talens (Liberal)	Martin S. Buenaventura (Liberal)	
2019	Ramil O. Dimapilis (Liberal)	Judy Ann D. Servando (PFP)	Lito Camo (Liberal)	Mae Arlene M. Talens (Liberal)	Emmanuel S. Buenaventura (PFP)	
2022	Roland H. Ruga (PDP–Laban)	Judy Ann D. Servando (MBS)	Lito Camo (Liberal)	Jomarc Philip E. Dimapilis (PDP–Laban)	Jean Paolo R. Umali (PFP)	
2025	Roland H. Ruga (GSM)	Anthony L. Yap (Lakas)	Jomarc Philip E. Dimapilis (GSM)	Emmanuel S. Buenaventura (PFP)	Jean Paolo R. Umali (PFP)	
