= Governor of Oriental Mindoro =

Local chief executive

- Gobernador ng Lalawigan ng Silangang Mindoro
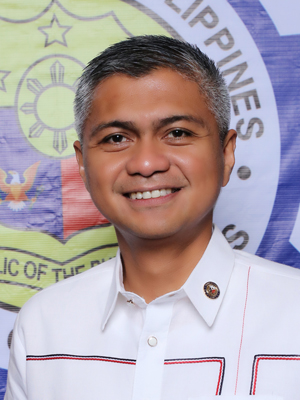
- Incumbent; Humerlito Atienza Dolor since June 30, 2019
- Style: The Honorable
- Seat: Oriental Mindoro Provincial Capitol, Calapan
- Term length: 3 years, renewable maximum not eligible for re-election immediately after three consecutive terms
- Inaugural holder: Conrado M. Morente (de facto, Governor of Mindoro from 1947-1951); Francisco S. Infantado (de jure, first elected Provincial Governor)
- Formation: December 30, 1951
- Deputy: Vice Governor

The governor of Oriental Mindoro is the local chief executive and head of the Provincial Government of Oriental Mindoro in the Philippines. Along with the governors of Marinduque, Occidental Mindoro, Palawan, and Romblon, the province's chief executive is a member of the Regional Development Council of the Mimaropa Region.

== History ==
On November 15, 1950, through Republic Act No. 505 signed by President Elpidio Quirino and as stated on his Proclamation No. 186, s. 1950, Mindoro was divided into two separate provinces of Occidental Mindoro and Oriental Mindoro. Subsequently, the first provincial election was held on November 13, 1951.

== List of governors of Oriental Mindoro ==
Governors of Oriental Mindoro

1. THIRD PHILIPPINE REPUBLIC (1947–1980)
No.	Image	Name	Term	Origin	Note(s)
1		Conrado M. Morente	December 30, 1947 - December 30, 1951	Pinamalayan	Elected Governor of undivided Mindoro in 1947.
2		Francisco S. Infantado	December 30, 1951 - December 30, 1959	Calapan	First elected governor. Elected twice.
3		Luciano A. Joson y Yason	December 30, 1959 - December 30, 1961	Socorro	Elected
4		Rodolfo Arce Ignacio	December 30, 1961 - December 30, 1963	Calapan	Succeeded Joson, who elected assemblyman.
4		Rodolfo Arce Ignacio	December 30, 1963 - December 30, 1967	Calapan	Elected
5		Alfonso L. Umali Sr.	December 30, 1967 - June 30, 1980	Bongabong	Elected twice.

2. FOURTH PHILIPPINE REPUBLIC (1980–1986)
No.	Image	Name	Term	Origin	Note(s)
6		Hicoblino M. Catly	June 30, 1980 - March 15, 1986	Calapan	Elected.

3. FIFTH PHILIPPINE REPUBLIC (1986–present)
No.	Image	Name	Term	Origin	Note(s)
7		Benjamin Ignacio Espiritu	March 16, 1986 - June 30, 1988	Calapan	Appointed by President Corazon C. Aquino.
7		Benjamin Ignacio Espiritu	June 30, 1988 - June 30, 1992	Calapan	Elected
8		Rodolfo Garong Valencia	June 30, 1992 - June 30, 2001	Naujan	Elected in 3 consecutive terms.
9		Bartolome Laya Marasigan	June 30, 2001 – June 30, 2004	Calapan	Elected.
9		Bartolome Laya Marasigan	June 30, 2004 – December 1, 2004	Calapan	Elected. Died while in office.
10		Arnan Capulong Panaligan	December 1, 2004 - June 30, 2007	Calapan	Former vice-governor, succeeded Marasigan.
10		Arnan Capulong Panaligan	June 30, 2007 - June 30, 2010	Calapan	Elected.
11		Alfonso Villar Umali Jr.	June 30, 2010 - June 30, 2019	Bongabong	Elected in 3 consecutive terms.
12		Humerlito Atienza Dolor	June 30, 2019 – present	Naujan	Elected in 3 consecutive terms
