= Socorro, Oriental Mindoro =

Municipality in Oriental Mindoro, Philippines

Socorro
- Municipality
- Municipality of Socorro
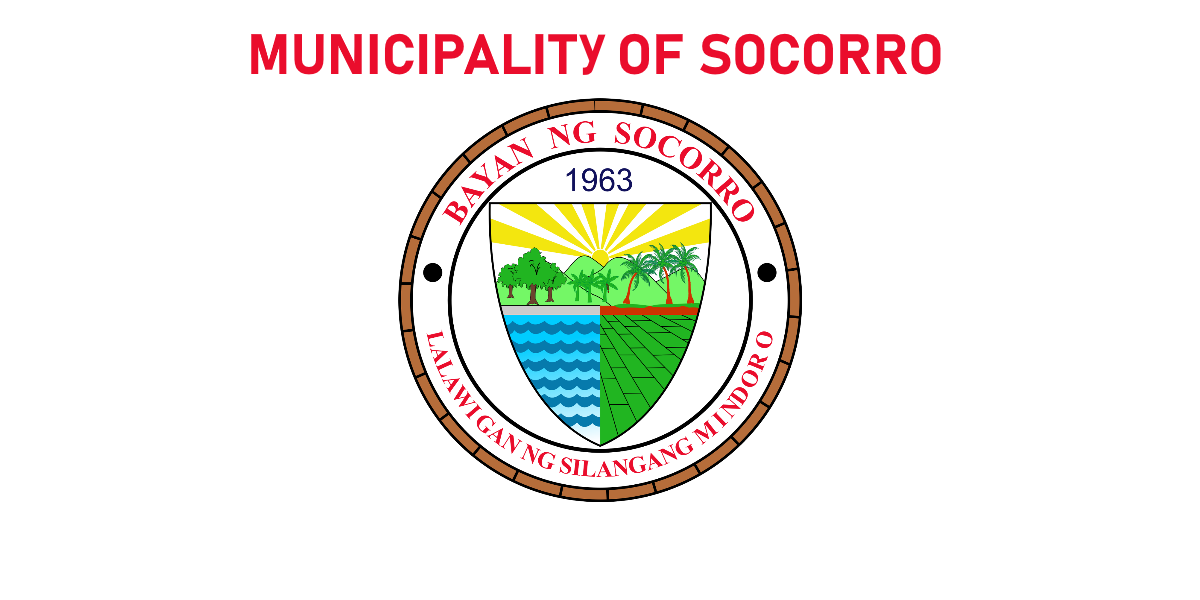
- Flag Seal

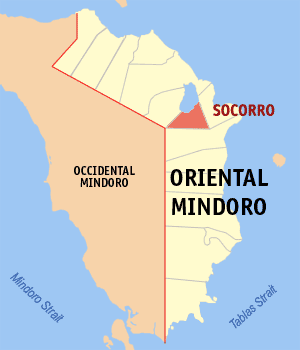
- Map of Oriental Mindoro with Socorro highlighted
- Interactive map of Socorro
- Location within the Philippines
- Coordinates: 13°03′30″N 121°24′42″E
- Country: Philippines
- Region: Mimaropa
- Province: Oriental Mindoro
- District: 1st district
- Barangays: 26 (see Barangays)

Government
  - Type: Sangguniang Bayan
  - Mayor: Nemmen O. Perez
  - Vice Mayor: Allan Kenneth P. Tolentino
  - Representative: Arnan C. Panaligan
  - Electorate: 25,189 voters (2025)

Area
  - Total: 151.38 km^{2} (58.45 sq mi)
- Elevation: 27 m (89 ft)
- Highest elevation: 205 m (673 ft)
- Lowest elevation: 8 m (26 ft)

Population (2024 census)
  - Total: 41,612
  - Density: 274.88/km^{2} (711.95/sq mi)
  - Households: 9,869

Economy
  - Income class: 2nd municipal income class
  - Poverty incidence: 18.47% (2023)
  - Revenue: ₱ 22.21 million (2024)
  - Assets: ₱ 1,053 million (2024)
  - Expenditure: ₱ 259.1 million (2024)
  - Liabilities: ₱ 126.7 million (2024)

Service provider
  - Electricity: Oriental Mindoro Electric Cooperative (ORMECO)
- Time zone: UTC+8 (PST)
- ZIP code: 5207
- PSGC: 1705214000
- IDD : area code: +63 (0)43
- Native languages: Buhid; Tadyawan; Tawbuid; Tagalog
- Website: www.socorromindoro.gov.ph

Socorro, officially the Municipality of Socorro (Tagalog: Bayan ng Socorro), is a municipality in the province of Oriental Mindoro, Philippines. According to the 2024 census, it has a population of 41,612 people.

== History ==
Socorro was established as a separate municipality on June 22, 1963, with the approval of Republic Act. No. 3609. It was formerly part of Pola.

In the last decade of the 20th century and the first decade of the 21st century, many roads were paved, the market rebuilt, and employment rose.

== Geography ==
Socorro is located at the junction of the Pola Road and is 61 kilometres (38 mi) from Calapan.

=== Barangays ===
Socorro is politically subdivided into 26 barangays. Each barangay consists of puroks and some have sitios.

- Batong Dalig
- Bayuin
- Bugtong Na Tuog
- Calocmoy
- Calubayan
- Catiningan
- Epiz (Bagsok)
- Happy Valley
- La Fortuna (Putol)
- Leuteboro I
- Leuteboro II
- Mabuhay I
- Mabuhay II
- Malugay
- Maria Concepcion
- Matungao
- Monteverde
- Pasi I
- Pasi II
- Santo Domingo (Lapog)
- Subaan
- Villareal (Daan)
- Zone I (Pob.)
- Zone II (Pob.)
- Zone III (Pob.)
- Zone IV (Pob.)

=== Climate ===
Climate data for Socorro, Oriental Mindoro
Month	Jan	Feb	Mar	Apr	May	Jun	Jul	Aug	Sep	Oct	Nov	Dec	Year
Mean daily maximum °C (°F)	26 (79)	28 (82)	29 (84)	31 (88)	31 (88)	30 (86)	29 (84)	29 (84)	29 (84)	29 (84)	28 (82)	27 (81)	29 (84)
Mean daily minimum °C (°F)	22 (72)	22 (72)	22 (72)	23 (73)	25 (77)	25 (77)	25 (77)	25 (77)	25 (77)	24 (75)	23 (73)	23 (73)	24 (75)
Average precipitation mm (inches)	115 (4.5)	66 (2.6)	55 (2.2)	39 (1.5)	164 (6.5)	282 (11.1)	326 (12.8)	317 (12.5)	318 (12.5)	192 (7.6)	119 (4.7)	173 (6.8)	2,166 (85.3)
Average rainy days	13.6	9.4	10.4	10.5	21.1	26.0	29.0	27.6	27.5	23.1	16.7	16.1	231
Source: Meteoblue

== Demographics ==
Population census of Socorro
Year	Pop.	±% p.a.
1970	15,456	—
1975	20,868	+6.21%
1980	24,332	+3.12%
1990	29,806	+2.05%
1995	34,182	+2.60%
2000	37,176	+1.82%
2007	38,052	+0.32%
2010	38,348	+0.28%
2015	39,099	+0.37%
2020	41,585	+1.31%
2024	41,612	+0.02%
Source: Philippine Statistics Authority

== Economy ==
Poverty incidence of Socorro (%)

Source: Philippine Statistics Authority

Agriculture still provides the main industry with rice, fruits, and coconut products dominating. Citrus products like calamansi, dalandan and pomelo are also abundant here together with rambutan and lanzones. Fresh fish from Lake Naujan at the northern end of the municipality and Balut are also important products. There is a large Mangyan population in the more remote parts of the municipality, and programs of assistance for these people have been implemented.

== Government ==
- Mayor: Nemmen O. Perez
- Vice Mayor: Allan Kenneth P. Tolentino

== Education ==
The Socorro Schools District Office governs all educational institutions within the municipality. It oversees the management and operations of all private and public, from primary to secondary schools.

=== Primary and elementary schools ===
- Bagsok Elementary School
- Batong Dalig Elementary School
- Bayuin Elementary School
- Calubayan Elementary School
- Calucmoy Elementary School
- Catiningan Elementary School
- Ciriaco V. Carle Memorial Elementary School
- Daan Elementary School
- Faith Covenant Academy
- Felomino C. Mendoza Elementary School
- Fortuna Elementary School
- Granvida Elementary School
- Happy Valley Elementary School
- Lapog Elementary School
- Leuteboro Adventist Elementary School
- Leuteboro Elementary School
- Mabuhay I Elementary School
- Mabuhay II Elementary School
- Malugay Elementary School
- Mana Christian Learning Center
- Maranatha Christian Academy
- Maria Concepcion Elementary School
- Matungao Elementary School
- Mina de Oro Catholic School
- Monteverde Elementary School
- Socorro Central School
- Socorro Christian Academy
- Subaan Elementary School
- Tigao Elementary School

=== Secondary schools ===
- Bayuin National High School
- Dr. Gregorio Valdez Institute
- Fortuna National High School
- Leuteboro National High School
- Mina de Oro Catholic High School

=== Higher educational institutions ===
- Grace Mission College
- IATEC Computer College
