= Occidental Mindoro Provincial Board =

Legislative body of the province of Occidental Mindoro, Philippines

Occidental Mindoro Provincial Board Sangguniang Panlalawigan ng Occidental Mindoro

Type
- Type: Unicameral
- Term limits: 3 terms (9 years)

Leadership
- Presiding Officer: Anecita Diana A. Tayag, PFP since June 30, 2022

Structure
- Seats: 14 board members 1 ex officio presiding officer
- Political groups: PFP (8) Liberal (1) Nacionalista (1) Nonpartisan (3) vacant (1)
- Length of term: 3 years
- Authority: Local Government Code of the Philippines

Elections
- Voting system: Multiple non-transferable vote (regular members); Indirect election (ex officio members); Acclamation (sectoral member)
- Last election: May 12, 2025
- Next election: May 15, 2028

Meeting place
- Occidental Mindoro Provincial Capitol, Mamburao

The Occidental Mindoro Provincial Board is the Sangguniang Panlalawigan (provincial legislature) of the Philippine province of Occidental Mindoro.

The members are elected via plurality-at-large voting: the province is divided into two districts, each having five seats. A voter votes up to five names, with the top five candidates per district being elected. The vice governor is the ex officio presiding officer, and only votes to break ties. The vice governor is elected via the plurality voting system province-wide.

The districts used in appropriation of members is not coextensive with the legislative district of Occidental Mindoro; unlike congressional representation which is at-large, Occidental Mindoro is divided into two districts for representation in the Sangguniang Panlalawigan.

Aside from the regular members, the board also includes the provincial federation presidents of the Liga ng mga Barangay (ABC, from its old name "Association of Barangay Captains"), the Sangguniang Kabataan (SK, youth councils) and the Philippine Councilors League (PCL). Occidental Mindoro's provincial board also has a reserved seat for its indigenous people (IPMR).

== Apportionment ==
Elections	Seats per district		Ex officio seats	Reserved seats	Total seats
Elections	1st	2nd	Ex officio seats	Reserved seats	Total seats
2010–present	5	5	3	1	14

== List of members ==
=== Current members ===
SThese are the members after the 2019 local elections and 2018 barangay and SK elections:

- Vice Governor: Anecita Diana A. Tayag (PFP)

Seat	Board member	Party	Start of term	End of term
1st district	Peter D. Alfaro	PFP	June 30, 2025	June 30, 2028
1st district	Ryan G. Sioson	PFP	June 30, 2022	June 30, 2028
1st district	Elorde A. Masangkay	PFP	June 30, 2025	June 30, 2028
1st district	Cirilo Q. Tejoso Jr.	PFP	June 30, 2022	June 30, 2028
1st district	Julius Glenn T. Espejo	Liberal	June 30, 2025	June 30, 2028
2nd district	Jose Franco C. Mendiola	PFP	June 30, 2022	June 30, 2028
2nd district	Roderick Q. Agas	PFP	June 30, 2025	June 30, 2028
2nd district	Sonia C. Pablo	Nacionalista	June 30, 2025	June 30, 2028
2nd district	Arneldo E. Agame	PFP	June 30, 2025	June 30, 2028
2nd district	Alex R. Del Valle	PFP	June 30, 2022	June 30, 2028
ABC	Abelardo Pangilinan	Nonpartisan	July 30, 2018	January 1, 2023
PCL	vacant		June 30, 2025	June 30, 2028
SK	Tricia Kaye Fabic	Nonpartisan	June 8, 2018	January 1, 2023
IPMR	Juanito Lumawig	Nonpartisan		

=== Vice governor ===
Election year	Name	Party	Ref.
2016	Peter DJ. Alfaro	Liberal	
2019	Peter DJ. Alfaro	PDP–Laban	
2022	Anecita Diana A. Tayag	PDDS	
2025	Anecita Diana A. Tayag	PFP	

=== 1st district ===
- Population (2024):

Election year	Member (party)	Member (party)	Member (party)	Member (party)	Member (party)	Ref.
2016	Edwin N. Mintu (Liberal)	Antonio Jose Rebong, III (Liberal)	Damaso G. Abeleda (Liberal)	Nestor Tria (Liberal)	Rocky D. Legaspi (Liberal)	
2019	Edwin N. Mintu (Liberal)	Antonio Jose Rebong, III (Liberal)	Mark Philip V. Ramirez (Liberal)	Nestor Tria (Liberal)	Emmanuel Abeleda, Jr. (Liberal)	
2022	Cirilo Q. Tejoso, Jr. (Liberal)	Antonio Jose Rebong, III (Liberal)	Glicerio S. Almero, III (Liberal)	Eddie Masangkay (PDDS)	Ryan G. Sioson (PDDS)	
2025	Cirilo Q. Tejoso, Jr. (PFP)	Peter D. Alfaro (PFP)	Elorde A. Masangkay (PFP)	Julius Glenn T. Espejo (Liberal)	Ryan G. Sioson (PFP)	

=== 2nd district ===
- Population (2024):

Election year	Member (party)	Member (party)	Member (party)	Member (party)	Member (party)	Ref.
2016	Jose A. Norella, Jr. (Liberal)	Ernesto Jaravata (Liberal)	Sonia Pablo (Lakas)	Ulysses P. Javier (Nacionalista)	Lope C. Asilo (Independent)	
2019	Anecita Diana A. Tayag (PDDS)	Ernesto Jaravata (Liberal)	Sonia Pablo (Nacionalista)	Michelle Festin (Liberal)	Eleonor Barrera (UNA)	
2022	Jose Franco C. Mendiola (PDDS)	Alex R. del Valle (PDDS)	Nathaniel D. Cruz (PDDS)	Ma. Antonietta G. Villarosa (Lakas)	Ulysses P. Javier (Nacionalista)	
2025	Jose Franco C. Mendiola (PFP)	Alex R. del Valle (PFP)	Roderick Q. Agas (PFP)	Arneldo E. Agame (PFP)	Sonia C. Pablo (Nacionalista)	
