= Ejay Falcon =

Filipino actor, model, endorser and politician (born 1989)

- Falcon in 2022

Vice Governor of Oriental Mindoro
- In office June 30, 2022 – June 30, 2025
- Governor: Humerlito Dolor
- Preceded by: Antonio Perez Jr.
- Succeeded by: Antonio Perez Jr.

Personal details
- Born: Edward Jake Lasap Falcon; 21 November 1989 (age 36) Pola, Oriental Mindoro, Philippines
- Party: PDP–Laban; GSM (local party)
- Height: 6 ft 0 in (183 cm)
- Spouse: Jana Roxas (m. 2023)
- Education: University of Makati (BA)
- Occupation: Actor; model; endorser; politician
- Military career
- Allegiance: Philippines
- Branch: Philippine Air Force
- Service years: 2019–Present
- Rank: Sergeant

Ejay Lasap Falcon (born 21 November 1989) is a Filipino actor, model, endorser and politician who last served as the vice governor of Oriental Mindoro from 2022 to 2025. As an actor, he came to prominence in 2008 after winning the reality show Pinoy Big Brother: Teen Edition Plus.

In 2009, the soap opera Katorse (a remake of a 1980 film), gained him prominence. In 2012, he starred in a Daytime drama Mundo Man ay Magunaw (a comics serial and the '90s film adaptation as Romnick Sarmenta). In 2016, he starred in The Greatest Love which gained Outstanding Praise for all the cast members involved. In 2017, the series The Blood Sisters gained him a new following as it reunited him with his Katorse castmates. From 2019 to 2020, he led the series SanDugo on Daytime which gave him leading man status. After almost 18 years with ABS-CBN, Falcon officially transferred to GMA Network in 2024.

== Early life and education ==
According to the Pinoy Big Brother: Teen Edition Plus website, Falcon's mother left his family in Mindoro when he was little and they never heard anything from her for a long time so at the age of 15, he went to Manila to look for her, only to find out that she had another family. During his three-year stay in Manila, he went to University of Manila and took a course in Hotel and Restaurant Management but was forced to quit school because of financial problems. It was also during that time that he met his manager, showbiz hairstylist Benjie Alipio, who took him in as a talent and entered him in Circle of 10 talent search. He did not win any title in the said talent search but it served as his ticket to get guest stints in various TV shows. Falcon was a former member of the Iglesia ni Cristo.

In August 2024, Falcon graduated from University of Makati with a Bachelor's degree in political science major in Local Governance.

== Acting career ==
=== Pinoy Big Brother: Teen Edition Plus ===
When the second season of Pinoy Big Brother started, Falcon auditioned and got in as one of the official housemates of Pinoy Big Brother: Teen Edition Plus. Clad in a Tarzan costume, he was introduced as "Promdi Hottie of Mindoro" who had trouble with technological gadgets and elevators when he first visited Manila.

He was the first housemate to get inside the Pinoy Big Brother house.

On day 75, he was proclaimed the Big Winner—the battle between him and Pinoy Big Brother: Teen Edition Plus's second teen placer Robi Domingo was the closest in Pinoy Big Brother history but he emerged the winner in the end with 36.31% of votes against the latter's 34.39%. His 620,934 votes earned him a title of "Big Winner", a P1.5 million business package from the Crystal Clear water purifying company, a laptop, a kitchen showcase, a 46-inch LCD television set, a condo unit, and a cash prize of P1 million.

Upon leaving the Pinoy Big Brother: Teen Edition Plus house, Falcon was immediately plagued by intrigues. Rumors went out that votes during the Big Night were manipulated in his favor and that he did not deserve to win his title. He was also plagued with questions hinting that he used to be a callboy and that he is not a real promdi (province boy). He denied these issues and said that he leaves the decision to God to judge his detractors. Furthermore, Laurenti Dyogi, the director of Pinoy Big Brother: Teen Edition Plus, defended him from these allegations saying that he won not just because he was poor but because he changed a lot and shared himself in Pinoy Big Brother: Teen Edition Plus.

=== After Pinoy Big Brother ===
Falcon's first acting stint after Pinoy Big Brother: Teen Edition Plus, around late 2008, was when he guested in an episode of That's My Doc with fellow housemate, Valerie Weigmann. He has already guested in various TV shows of ABS-CBN and is part of the third season of TV5's Lipgloss. He also played a short role in Habang May Buhay, a primetime TV series of ABS-CBN which started airing 2010. He also made a guest appearance in ABS-CBN's top-rating primetime drama series, May Bukas Pa, last April 2009, and became a recurring cast of the said show. Finally in 2009, he played a major role as Gabby Arcanghel opposite Erich Gonzales in ABS-CBN's drama series entitled Katorse. This was followed by another show entitled Tanging Yaman where he was one of the main cast alongside his previous co-stars in "Katorse", Enchong Dee and Erich Gonzales. In 2010, he also played a major role as Xyriel Manabat's brother in the show entitled Momay. In the said show, he was paired with Queenie Padilla. In addition, he also appeared in a number of ABS-CBN's MMK and Wansapanataym episodes.

Currently, Falcon is the model/endorser of Bench, Converse, Lacoste, Afficcionado Perfumes and Fashion Exchange.

His last project was Guns and Roses in which he was paired on-screen with Empress Schuck. The show ended in September 2011 but there were rumours that Falcon was planning to court Empress and continue the romance off-screen, but the two say they are happy just being friends.

== Political career ==
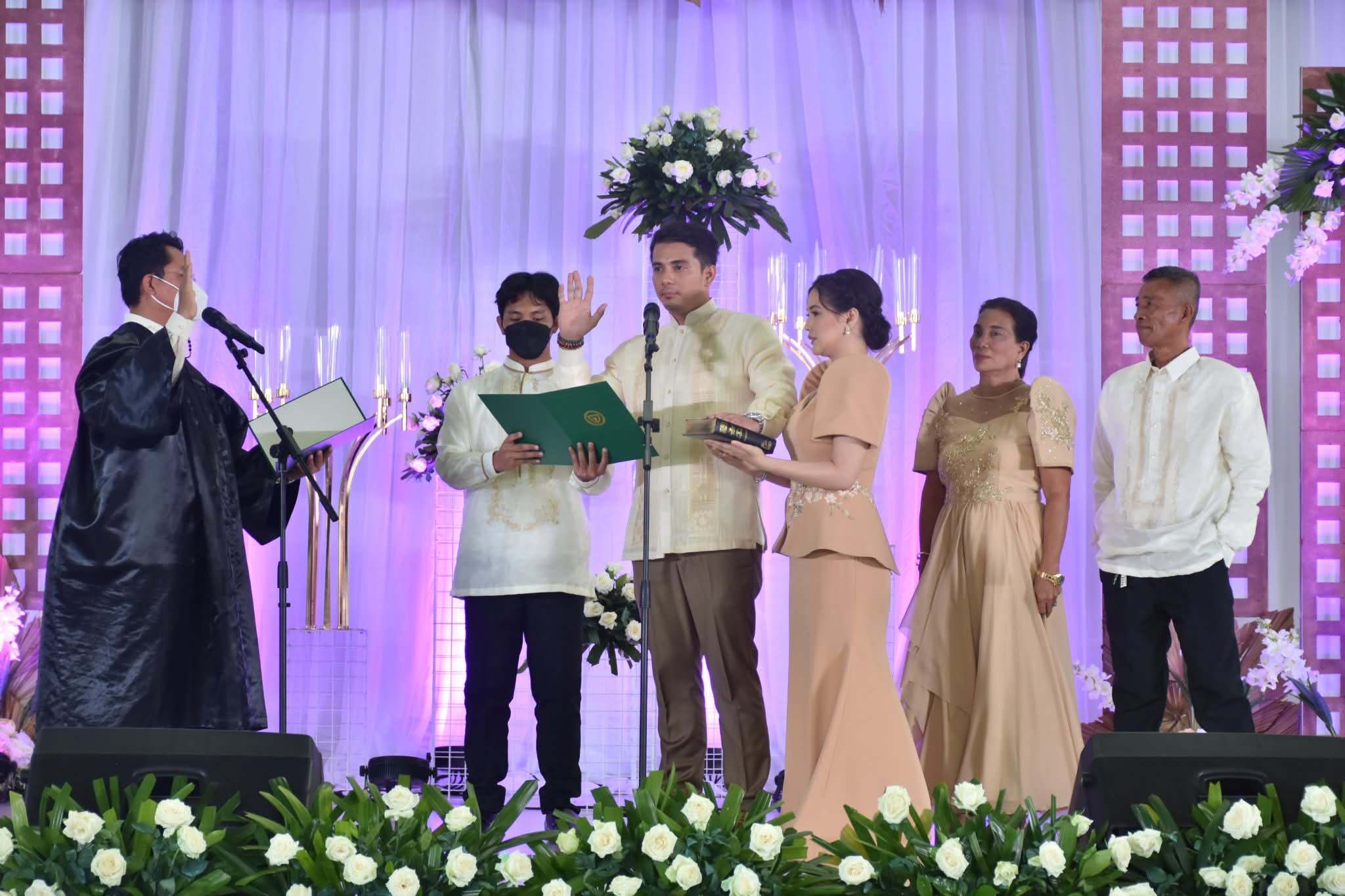
Ejay Falcon taking His Oath Of Office as Vice Governor Infront of Judge Erwin Y. Dimayacyac

In 2022, Falcon was elected as vice governor of Oriental Mindoro, with incumbent governor Humerlito Dolor as his running mate. In 2025, he ran for congressional representative of Oriental Mindoro's 2nd district but lost to the incumbent Alfonso Umali Jr.

== Personal life ==
In 2016, Jana Roxas began a relationship with Falcon. They got married on March 25, 2023 after seven years of dating.

In 2024, Falcon earned his degree in Political Science major in Local Government Administration at the University of Makati.

== Electoral history ==
Electoral history of Ejay Falcon
Year	Office	Party	Votes received				Result
Year	Office	Party	Total	%	P.	Swing	Result
2022	Vice Governor of Oriental Mindoro	PDP–Laban	226,875	54.99%	1st	—N/a	Won
2025	Representative (Oriental Mindoro–2nd)	GSM	91,073	44.25%	2nd	—N/a	Lost

== Filmography ==
=== Film ===
Year	Title	Role	Ref.
2010	Father Jejemon	Luis	
2011	Tum: My Pledge Of Love	Ibrahim Mata	
2012	Amorosa: The Revenge	William	
2013	Call Center Girl	Dennis	
2013	Saka Saka	Alex Abueg	
2013	10,000 Hours	Gabriel's son	
2013	Girl, Boy, Bakla, Tomboy	Harry	
2014	Third Eye	Jimmy	
2015	Homeless		
2015	Felix Manalo	Serapio Dionisio	
2016	Resbak	Lucas	
2017	Extra Service	Moises	
2017	Can't Help Falling in Love	Trino	
2017	Gandarrapiddo: The Revenger Squad	Mino	

=== Television ===
Year	Title	Role	Notes	Ref.
2008	Pinoy Big Brother: Teen Edition Plus	Himself	Winner	
2008–present	ASAP XP	Himself / Occasional Performer		
2008	That's My Doc	Bronson (10 years after)		
2008	Midnight DJ	Percy	Episode: "Parola"	
2009	Lipgloss	Santi / Santino		
2009	May Bukas Pa	Boy George		
2009–2010	Katorse	Gabriel "Gabby" Arcanghel		
2010	Tanging Yaman	Epifanio "Epi" Inciong		
2010	Habang May Buhay	Nenok		
2010	Elena M. Patron's Momay	Justin "JJ" Buenavidez		
2010	Maalaala Mo Kaya	Dindo	Episode: "Rosas"	
2010	Wansapanataym	Mel Abaruray	Episode: "Abaruray, Abarinding"	
2011	Your Song Presents: Kim	Arnold		
2011	Agimat: Ang Mga Alamat ni Ramon Revilla Presents Pepeng Kuryente	Pepe		
2011	Maalaala Mo Kaya	Collin	Episode: "Wheelchair"	
2011	Maalaala Mo Kaya	Efren	Episode: "Medalyon"	
2011	Guns and Roses	Jonathan "Onat" Marasigan		
2011	Wansapanataym	Carl	Episode: "Ang Bagong Car Ni Carl"	
2011	Wansapanataym	Homer Santos	Episode: "OMG, Oh My Ghost"	
2011	Maalaala Mo Kaya	Paolo	Episode: "Baunan"	
2012	Mundo Man ay Magunaw	Dominiko "Niko" Poblador		
2012	Wansapanataym	Bugoy	Episode: "Wansapana-Ride"	
2013	Carlo J. Caparas' Dugong Buhay	Gabriel de Lara / Victor Bernabe		
2013	Wansapanataym	Joselito "Joey" Pascual	Episode: "The Christmas Visitor"	
2013	Jim Fernandez's Galema, Anak Ni Zuma	Sgt. Alexander Pagaran		
2014	Wansapanataym	Andrew	Episode: "My Guardian Angel"	
2014	Maalaala Mo Kaya	Mark	Episode: "Jeep"	
2014	Ipaglaban Mo!	Jigger	Episode: "Kasal Ka Sa Akin"	
2014	Maalaala Mo Kaya	Jomar	Episode: "Pedicab"	
2015	Maalaala Mo Kaya	Police Sr. Ins. Rennie "Ren-Ren" Tayrus	Episode: "Watawat"	
2015	Ipaglaban Mo!	Boyet	Episode: "Tanging Saksi"	
2015–2016	Pasión de Amor	Oscar Samonte/Reyes		
2015	Wansapanataym	Antonio "Tonyo" Jimenez	Episode: "I Heart Kuryente Kid"	
2016	Maalaala Mo Kaya	NJ	Episode: "Gitara"	
2016	Maalaala Mo Kaya	Jomz	Episode: "Halo-halo"	
2016	The Greatest Love	Peter Alcantara (young)		
2017	Wildflower (season 1)	Julio Ardiente (young)		
2017	Maalaala Mo Kaya	Tim	Episode: "Red Watch"	
2017	Ipaglaban Mo!	Gio	Episode: "Mental"	
2017	Maalaala Mo Kaya	Ray	Episode: "Army"	
2017	FPJ's Ang Probinsyano	SPO2 Geraldo "Gerry" Dela Paz		
2017	The Promise of Forever	Philip Borja		
2018	The Blood Sisters	Antonio "Tonyo" Alipio		
2018	Where Stars Land	Ian Santos	Episodes 7–8	
2018	Ipaglaban Mo!	Rod	Episode: "Agrabyado"	
2019–2020	Sandugo	Julius Caesar "JC" Reyes		
2020–2021	Paano ang Pasko?	Carl		
2020–2021	Paano ang Pangako?	Carl		
2021	Maalaala Mo Kaya	Ralph Andres	Episode: "Tattoo"	
2023	FPJ's Batang Quiapo	Rigor Dimaguiba (young)		
2023–2024	Nag-aapoy na Damdamin	Elias Delgado		
2024	Walang Matigas na Pulis sa Matinik na Misis	Ace Catacutan		
2025–2026	Roja	Marlon Areza		
2026	Blood vs Duty	Usman Sabdani		

== See also ==
- Pinoy Big Brother: Teen Edition Plus

Awards and achievements
Preceded by Ruben Gonzaga	Pinoy Big Brother; Big Winner; 2008	Succeeded by Melai Cantiveros
Preceded by Kim Chiu	Pinoy Big Brother; Teen Big Winner; 2008	Succeeded by (Australia) James Reid
Political offices
Preceded by Antonio Perez Jr.	Vice Governor of Oriental Mindoro; 2022–2025	Succeeded by Antonio Perez Jr.
