= Arnan Panaligan =

Filipino lawyer and politician

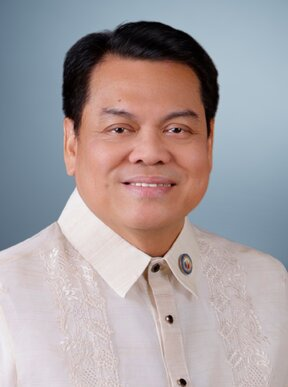
- Official portrait, 2025

Member of the Philippine House of Representatives from Oriental Mindoro's 1st District
- Incumbent
- Assumed office June 30, 2022
- Preceded by: Paulino Salvador Leachon

Governor of Oriental Mindoro
- In office December 1, 2004 – June 30, 2010
- Vice Governor: Maria Estela Felipa Aceron
- Preceded by: Bartolome Marasigan
- Succeeded by: Alfonso Umali Jr.

Vice Governor of Oriental Mindoro
- In office June 30, 2004 – December 1, 2004
- Governor: Bartolome Marasigan
- Preceded by: Thaddeus Venturanza
- Succeeded by: Maria Estela Felipa Aceron

Mayor of Calapan
- In office June 30, 2013 – June 30, 2022
- Vice Mayor: Bong Brucal (2013–2016); Gil Ramirez (2016–2022)
- Preceded by: Paulino Salvador Leachon
- Succeeded by: Malou Morillo
- In office June 30, 1995 – June 30, 2004
- Vice Mayor: Carlos Brucal (1992–2001); Roberto Paras (2001–2007)
- Preceded by: Rosalia Umali
- Succeeded by: Carlos Brucal

Personal details
- Born: January 21, 1962 (age 64) Calapan, Oriental Mindoro, Philippines
- Citizenship: Filipino
- Party: Lakas (1995–2012; 2022–present); MBS (local party; 2021–present)
- Other political affiliations: PDP-Laban (2018–2022); UNA (2012–2018)
- Education: Divine Word College of Calapan; Ateneo de Manila University
- Occupation: Politician

Arnan Capulong Panaligan (born January 21, 1962) is a Filipino lawyer and politician. He has served as the representative for Oriental Mindoro's 1st congressional district since 2022 as part of the local Mindoro Bago Sarili party. He had previously served as the mayor of Calapan from 2013 to 2022, having previously been mayor from 1995 to 2004. He was also the Governor of Oriental Mindoro from 2004 to 2010.

== Early career ==
Arnan Panaligan was born on January 21, 1962, in Calapan, Oriental Mindoro, to Leandro and Araceli Panaligan. He completed his elementary and high school education at Holy Infant Academy, then pursued his undergraduate studies at the Divine Word College of Calapan. He later earned his law degree from Ateneo de Manila University.

After passing the bar examination in 1987, Panaligan began his legal career as a legal researcher at the Supreme Court of the Philippines. He also served as a technical assistant at the House of Representatives Electoral Tribunal (HRET).

== Political career ==
=== Local Politics ===
Panaligan's political career began when he was elected Mayor of Calapan in 1995.

Under his tenure, Calapan underwent major transformations. Panaligan oversaw various infrastructure enhancements, including the development of concrete roads and schools in rural areas. He also issued health insurance programmes to low-income houses. He also successfully attracted external investors to the city.

In 2004, Panaligan ran for vice governor of Oriental Mindoro as the running mate of the then-incumbent governor Bartolome Marasigan. The ticket would win the election, with Panaligan being sworn in on June 30, 2004.

Following the death of Marasigan on December 1, 2004, Panaligan succeeded Marasigan as governor. Panaligan would be re-elected in 2007 but was defeated by Alfonso Umali Jr. in 2010 with him getting 149,537 Votes in the tight election.

In 2013, Panaligan ran for the Calapan mayoralty under the banner of the United Nationalist Alliance (UNA). He defeated the Liberal candidate Antonio "Jojo" S. Perez Jr., marking his return to the mayoralty. He ran and won unopposed under PDP–Laban in 2019.

=== Congressional career ===
In 2022, Panaligan ran for representative in Oriental Mindoro's 1st congressional district to replace outgoing representative Paulino Salvador Leachon, who was term-limited and was running for governor. Running under the Mindoro Bago Sarili banner, Panaligan would defeat PDP–Laban's Mark Marcos and independent Eduardo Alvaro.
