= Humerlito Dolor =

Filipino politician (born 1976)

The Honorable Humerlito Dolor
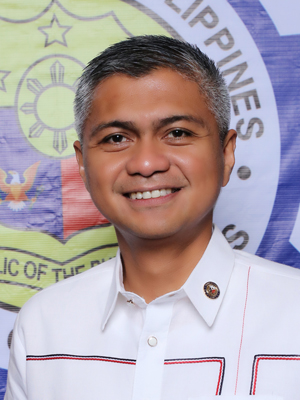
- Dolor in 2019

Governor of Oriental Mindoro
- Incumbent
- Assumed office June 30, 2019
- Vice Governor: Antonio Perez Jr. (2019–2022, 2025–present); Ejay Falcon (2022–2025)
- Preceded by: Alfonso V. Umali, Jr.

Vice Governor of Oriental Mindoro
- In office June 30, 2010 – June 30, 2019
- Governor: Alfonso V. Umali, Jr.
- Preceded by: Maria Estela Felipa Aceron
- Succeeded by: Antonio Perez Jr.

Member of the Oriental Mindoro Provincial Board from the 1st District
- In office June 30, 2007 – June 30, 2010
- In office June 30, 2001 – June 30, 2004

Personal details
- Born: Humerlito Atienza Dolor; November 27, 1976 (age 49) Naujan, Oriental Mindoro, Philippines
- Party: PDP (2018–present); GSM (local party)
- Other political affiliations: Liberal (2001–2007, 2009–2018); LDP (2007–2009)
- Education: Divine Word College of Calapan
- Military career
- Allegiance: Philippines
- Branch: Philippine Army Reserve Command
- Rank: Major

Humerlito "Bonz" Atienza Dolor (born November 27, 1976) is a Filipino politician from Naujan, Oriental Mindoro, and currently the Governor of Oriental Mindoro. He previously served as Vice Governor of the province from 2010 until 2019.

== Career ==
=== Early career ===
Dolor served as vice governor of the province for three terms from 2010 until 2019, under Governor Alfonso Umali. He started his political career in his youth as chairperson of Sangguniang Kabataan of Barangay Adrialuna in Naujan in 1992, And Later elected SK Provincial Federation President in 1996, thus becoming an Ex officio Member of the Sangguniang Panlalawigan of Oriental Mindoro. In 2001, he was elected as board member for the 1st District of Oriental Mindoro, and served until 2004. He ran for vice governor in 2004, only to lose to Arnan Panaligan. He was elected to the provincial board in 2007, placing second overall.

=== Governor ===
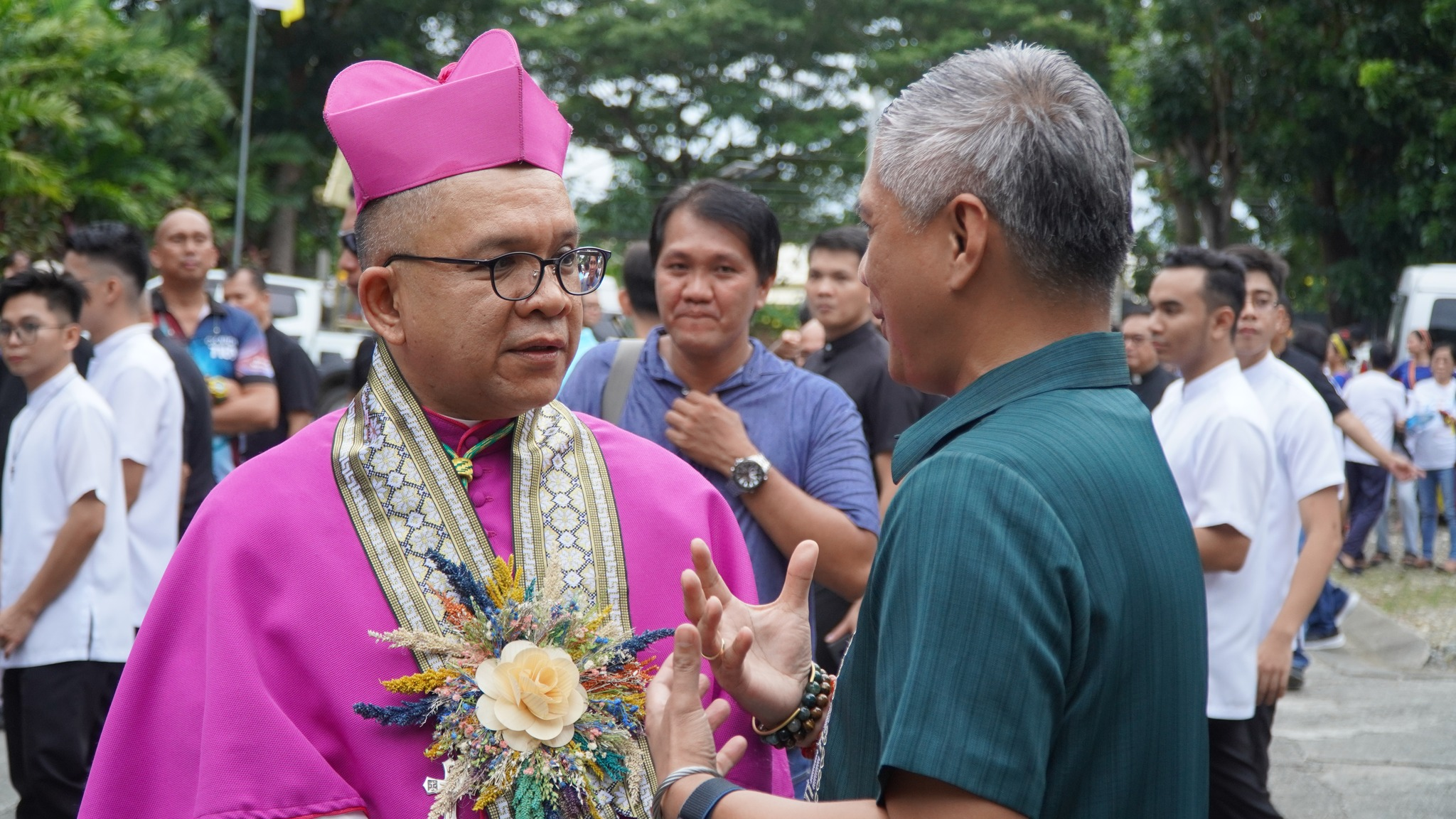
Dolor With Moises Cuevas

Dolor successfully ran for Governor of Oriental Mindoro in the 2019 gubernatorial elections. Running under the PDP–Laban party, He garnered 213,312 votes besting rivals last-termer Second District Representative Reynaldo Umali and Rodolfo Valencia who got 117,617 and 30,923 respectively.

He was re-elected in 2022, defeating former Representative Paulino Salvador Leachon. In 2025, he was re-elected for a third term defeating Joanna Valencia De Jesus, daughter of former Governor Rodolfo Valencia.

==== Flood control issue ====
Dolor has been involved in large-scale river dredging projects in Oriental Mindoro—principally at the mouth of the Balete River in Gloria — which he supported as part of a flood-mitigation and river-restoration program. The projects drew growing opposition in 2025 from the provincial board, church and civic groups, select city governments, and fisherfolk organizations, who questioned their environmental impact and transparency.

On September 1, 2025, Dolor filed a cyberlibel complaint against satirical page Follow The Trend Movement for its post on the issue.

On September 8, 2025, Dolor testified before the Senate Blue Ribbon Committee on the alleged large-scale corruption he found from the numerous flood control projects in Oriental Mindoro. He cited comparisons between the allotted budgets for flood control in Oriental Mindoro by the National Expenditure Program (NEP) and by the General Appropriations Act, where the insertions to the NEP-provided budget of ₱12.77 million during the period of 2022 to 2025 reached a total of ₱17.82 million.

== Personal life ==
He is married to Hiyas Govinda Ramos who ran as the Third Nominee for FPJ Panday Bayanihan but failed to win a Seat. His Older brother Hubbert Dolor served as Mayor Of Puerto Galera from 2007 to 2016. He is a Major in the Philippine Army Reserve Command with the designation of Deputy Brigade Commander.

Political offices
Preceded by Alfonso Umali Jr.	Governor of Oriental Mindoro; 2019–present	Incumbent
