= Oriental Mindoro's 1st congressional district =

Legislative district of the Philippines

- Constituency for the House of Representatives of the Philippines
- Location of Oriental Mindoro within the Philippines
- Province: Oriental Mindoro
- Region: Mimaropa
- Population: 452,908 (2015)
- Electorate: 282,342 (2019)
- Major settlements: 8 LGUs: Cities; Calapan; Municipalities; Baco; Naujan; Pola; Puerto Galera; San Teodoro; Socorro; Victoria
- Area: 2,015.19 km^{2} (778.07 sq mi)

Current constituency
- Created: 1987
- Representative: Arnan C. Panaligan
- Political party: Lakas-CMD
- Congressional bloc: Majority

Oriental Mindoro's 1st congressional district is one of the two congressional districts of the Philippines in the province of Oriental Mindoro. It has been represented in the House of Representatives since 1987. The district encompasses the province's northern half composed of its capital city Calapan and the municipalities of Baco, Naujan, Pola, Puerto Galera, San Teodoro, Socorro and Victoria. It is currently represented in the 20th Congress by Arnan C. Panaligan of the Lakas–CMD.

== Representation history ==
#	Image	Member	Term of office		Congress	Party	Electoral history	Constituent LGUs
#	Image	Member	Start	End	Congress	Party	Electoral history	Constituent LGUs
=== Oriental Mindoro's 1st district for the House of Representatives of the Philippines ===
District created February 2, 1987 from Oriental Mindoro's at-large district.
1		Rodolfo G. Valencia	June 30, 1987	June 30, 1992	8th	Liberal	Elected in 1987.	1987–present Baco, Calapan, Naujan, Pola, Puerto Galera, San Teodoro, Socorro, Victoria
2		Renato V. Leviste	June 30, 1992	June 30, 2001	9th	Nacionalista	Elected in 1992.	1987–present Baco, Calapan, Naujan, Pola, Puerto Galera, San Teodoro, Socorro, Victoria
2		Renato V. Leviste	June 30, 1992	June 30, 2001	10th	Lakas	Re-elected in 1995.	1987–present Baco, Calapan, Naujan, Pola, Puerto Galera, San Teodoro, Socorro, Victoria
2		Renato V. Leviste	June 30, 1992	June 30, 2001	11th	Lakas	Re-elected in 1998.	1987–present Baco, Calapan, Naujan, Pola, Puerto Galera, San Teodoro, Socorro, Victoria
3		Charity P. Leviste	June 30, 2001	June 30, 2004	12th	Lakas	Elected in 2001.	1987–present Baco, Calapan, Naujan, Pola, Puerto Galera, San Teodoro, Socorro, Victoria
(1)		Rodolfo G. Valencia	June 30, 2004	June 30, 2013	13th	Liberal	Elected in 2004.	1987–present Baco, Calapan, Naujan, Pola, Puerto Galera, San Teodoro, Socorro, Victoria
(1)		Rodolfo G. Valencia	June 30, 2004	June 30, 2013	14th	Lakas	Re-elected in 2007.	1987–present Baco, Calapan, Naujan, Pola, Puerto Galera, San Teodoro, Socorro, Victoria
(1)		Rodolfo G. Valencia	June 30, 2004	June 30, 2013	15th	Liberal	Re-elected in 2010.	1987–present Baco, Calapan, Naujan, Pola, Puerto Galera, San Teodoro, Socorro, Victoria
4		Paulino Salvador Leachon	June 30, 2013	June 30, 2022	16th	Liberal	Elected in 2013.	1987–present Baco, Calapan, Naujan, Pola, Puerto Galera, San Teodoro, Socorro, Victoria
4		Paulino Salvador Leachon	June 30, 2013	June 30, 2022	17th	PDP–Laban	Re-elected in 2016.	1987–present Baco, Calapan, Naujan, Pola, Puerto Galera, San Teodoro, Socorro, Victoria
4		Paulino Salvador Leachon	June 30, 2013	June 30, 2022	18th	PDP–Laban	Re-elected in 2019.	1987–present Baco, Calapan, Naujan, Pola, Puerto Galera, San Teodoro, Socorro, Victoria
5		Arnan C. Panaligan	June 30, 2022	Incumbent	19th	Lakas	Elected in 2022.	1987–present Baco, Calapan, Naujan, Pola, Puerto Galera, San Teodoro, Socorro, Victoria
5		Arnan C. Panaligan	June 30, 2022	Incumbent	20th	Lakas	Re-elected in 2025.	1987–present Baco, Calapan, Naujan, Pola, Puerto Galera, San Teodoro, Socorro, Victoria

== See also ==
- Legislative districts of Oriental Mindoro
