= Paulino Salvador Leachon =

Filipino politician

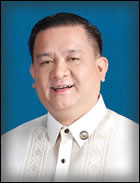
- Official portrait, 2013

Senior Deputy Speaker of the House of Representatives
- In office October 14, 2020 – June 1, 2022
- House Speaker: Lord Allan Velasco

Member of the Philippine House of Representatives from Oriental Mindoro's 1st congressional district
- In office June 30, 2013 – June 30, 2022
- Preceded by: Rodolfo Valencia
- Succeeded by: Arnan Panaligan

Mayor of Calapan
- Incumbent
- Assumed office June 30, 2025
- Vice Mayor: Bim Ignacio
- Preceded by: Malou Morillo
- In office June 30, 2007 – June 30, 2013
- Vice Mayor: Raf Intantafo (2007–2010); Antonio Perez Jr. (2010–2013)
- Preceded by: Carlos Brucal
- Succeeded by: Arnan Panaligan

Personal details
- Born: May 13, 1973 (age 53) Calapan, Oriental Mindoro, Philippines
- Citizenship: Filipino
- Party: Lakas (2007–2009; 2024–present); MBS (local party; 2021–present)
- Other political affiliations: PDP–Laban (2016–2024); Liberal (2009–2016)
- Spouse: Rona Leachon
- Relatives: Tony Leachon (brother)
- Education: San Beda College of Law
- Occupation: Politician

Paulino Salvador Cueto Leachon, better known as Doy Leachon, is a Filipino politician and lawyer. A member of PDP–Laban, served as the representative for Oriental Mindoro's 1st congressional district from 2013 to 2022. Upon reaching his term-limit as representative, he ran in the 2022 Oriental Mindoro gubernatorial race, losing to incumbent governor Humerlito Dolor.

== Early life and education ==
Leachon was born in Calapan, Oriental Mindoro on May 13, 1974. He attended San Beda College of Law, where he graduated with Bachelor of Laws. Following the graduation, he worked as a taxi driver, as well as a fast food crew member. He was also a private lawyer.

== Political career ==
=== Local politics ===
Leachon began his political career through his election as the Mayor of Calapan in 2007, when he was 33 years old. In 2010 he was Elected a Second Term

In 2009, Leachon was charged for graft for the private usage of city-owned dump trucks. He was acquitted from this case in April 2019.

=== Congressional career ===
He was first elected to the House of Representatives in the 2013 election, where he ran in Oriental Mindoro's 1st congressional district, defeating Nico Valencia, who was the son of the then incumbent representative Rodolfo Valencia. He was re-elected in 2016, defeating Joel Teves of the United Nationalist Alliance. He was re-elected in 2019, defeating Malou Morillo.

On March 2, 2020, Leachon was voted out of the House of Representatives Electoral Tribunal (HRET), where he was chairman. Luis Raymund Villafuerte, the representative for Camarines Sur's 2nd congressional District, cited conflict of interest as a reason for his ouster, as Leachon did not disclose his pending case before the tribunal. Although Leachon denounced Villafuerte's claim, he was replaced by Ron Salo.

On October 14, 2020, Leachon was named Deputy Speaker of the House of Representatives, along with Michael Romero.

=== 2022 Oriental Mindoro gubernatorial campaign ===
In 2022, upon reaching the three-term limit, Leachon opted to run for Governor of Oriental Mindoro. He would lose the race to incumbent governor Humerlito Dolor, with a margin of 73,495 votes.

=== 2025 Calapan City Mayoralty Campaign ===
In 2025 He Opted to Run for a third term Against incumbent Malou Morillo. He Won Against incumbent Mayor Malou Morillo, securing a third term as Mayor of Calapan.

== Political positions ==
Leachon is a supporter of the death penalty.

== Political party ==
=== Mindoro Bago Sarili ===
Mindoro Bago Sarili
- Chairman: Doy Leachon
- Founded: c. 2020s (Registered September 20, 2021)
- Headquarters: Oriental Mindoro
- Colors: Orange; White
- Slogan: Maaasahan Bawat Salita. Hindi ito bola. (transl. Trust Every Word. It's Not a Deception.)

Mindoro Bago Sarili (MBS Party) is a provincial political party based in the province of Oriental Mindoro. It is headed by Doy Leachon, former member of the Philippine House of Representatives from Oriental Mindoro's 1st District.

==== History ====
The party formed in Oriental Mindoro by Congressman. Doy Leachon in 2020s before the 2022 election will began, In September 20, 2021 the party was already registered by COMELEC.

==== Leader ====
- Doy Leachon (Since September 20, 2021)

== Personal life ==
Leachon is married to Rona Leachon, who unsuccessfully ran for the Calapan mayoralty in 2016. His elder brother, Antonio "Tony" Leachon, is a doctor and 50th President of the Philippine College of Physicians.
