= 2022 Occidental Mindoro local elections =

Local elections in the Philippines

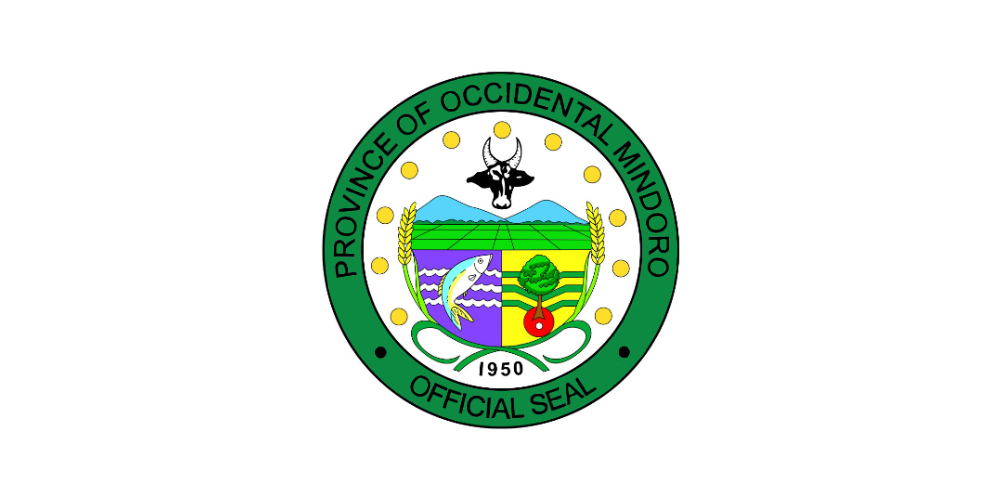
- Registered: 313,427
- Turnout: 263,187
- 2022 Occidental Mindoro gubernatorial election
- May 9, 2022
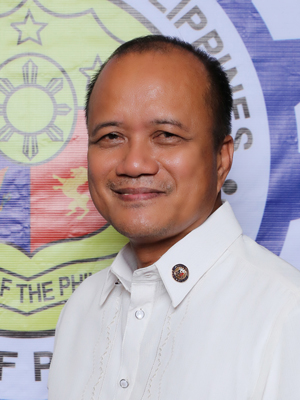

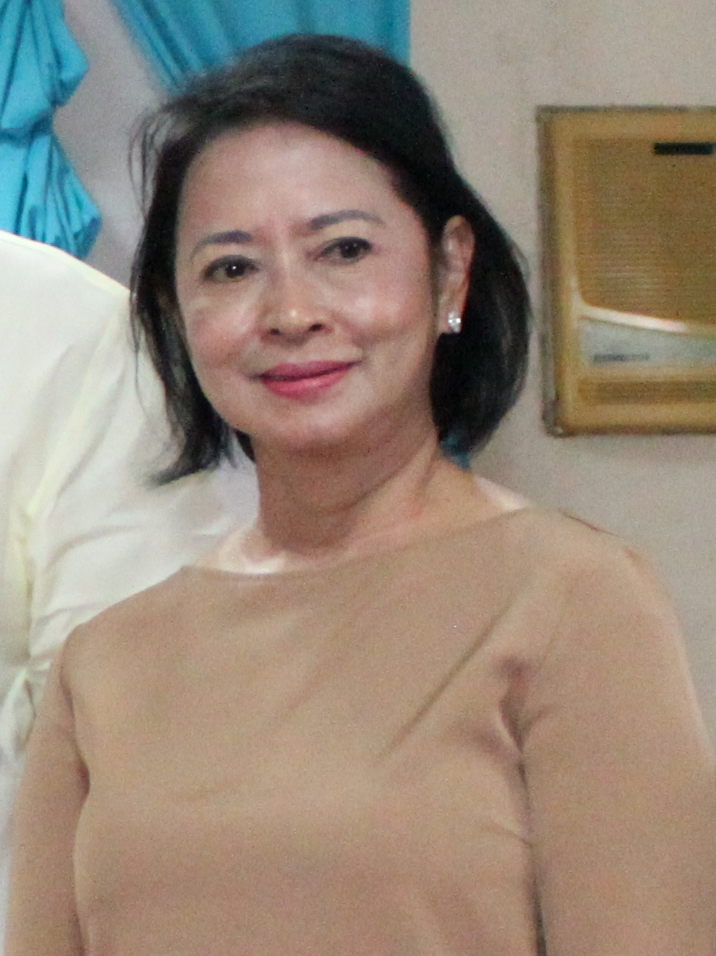
			Ind
Candidate	Eduardo Gadiano	Josephine Sato	Adrian Gatdula
Party	PDDS	Liberal	Independent
Running mate	Diana Apigo-Tayag	Eric Constantino
Popular vote	150,804	92,208	1,781
Percentage	61.60	37.66	0.72
Governor before election
Eduardo Gadiano
PDDS
Elected Governor
Eduardo Gadiano
PDDS

Local elections were held in Occidental Mindoro on May 9, 2022, as part of the 2022 Philippine general election. Voters will select candidates for all local positions: a town mayor, vice mayor, and town councilors, as well as members of the Sangguniang Panlalawigan, a vice-governor, a governor, and a representative for the province's lone congressional district in the Philippine House of Representatives.

== Results ==
Incumbent governor Eduardo Gadiano of Pederalismo ng Dugong Dakilang Samahan (PDDS) defeated outgoing representative Josephine Sato of the Liberal Party (LP), winning a new second consecutive term. Meanwhile, Diana Apigo-Tayag (PDDS) defeated Eric Constantino (LP) in the vice-gubernatorial race. In the lone congressional district, Odie Tarriela (PDDS) defeated Philip Ramirez (LP).

=== Governor ===
Occidental Mindoro Gubernatorial Election
Party	Candidate	Votes	%
PDDS	Eduardo Gadiano	150,804	61.60
Liberal	Josephine Sato	92,208	37.66
Independent	Adrian Gatdula	1,781	0.72
Total votes		244,793	100
PDDS hold			

==== Per Municipality ====
Municipality	Eduardo Gadiano		Josephine Sato		Adrian Gatdula	
Municipality	Votes	%	Votes	%	Votes	%
Abra de Ilog	9,721	63.42	5,513	35.97	94	0.61
Calintaan	8,808	65.61	4,529	33.74	87	0.65
Looc	2,924	49.56	2,931	49.68	45	0.76
Lubang	5,385	50.98	5,110	48.38	67	0.63
Magsaysay	10,663	57.67	7,732	41.81	96	0.52
Mamburao	13,610	57.65	9,809	41.55	191	0.81
Paluan	7,038	66.07	3,553	33.36	61	0.57
Rizal	11,217	58.05	7,950	41.14	157	0.81
Sablayan	28,408	69.41	12,313	30.09	206	0.50
San Jose	39,900	59.50	26,535	39.57	628	0.94
Santa Cruz	12,953	67.24	6,163	31.99	149	0.77
TOTAL	150,804	61.60	92,208	37.66	1,781	0.72

=== Vice Governor ===
Occidental Mindoro Vice Gubernatorial Election
Party	Candidate	Votes	%
PDDS	Diana Apigo-Tayag	142,152	63.25
Liberal	Eric Constantino	82,576	36.74
Total votes		224,728	100
PDDS gain from PDP–Laban			

==== Per Municipality ====
Municipality	Diana Apigo-Tayag		Eric Constantino	
Municipality	Votes	%	Votes	%
Abra de Ilog	6,842	46.42	7,896	53.58
Calintaan	8,589	68.51	3,948	31.49
Looc	2,392	47.67	2,626	52.33
Lubang	4,629	50.21	4,591	49.79
Magsaysay	10,826	63.83	6,134	36.17
Mamburao	10,795	50.37	10,638	49.63
Paluan	5,855	59.39	4,004	40.61
Rizal	11,854	65.53	6,235	34.47
Sablayan	25,320	67.28	12,314	32.72
San Jose	43,740	70.58	18,229	29.42
Santa Cruz	11,152	65.42	5,894	34.58
TOTAL	142,152	63.25	82,576	36.74

=== Congressional District ===
Philippine House of Representatives Election at Occidental Mindoro's Lone District
Party	Candidate	Votes	%
PDDS	Odie Tarriela	92,864	38.64
Liberal	Philip Ramirez	44,607	18.56
Reporma	Noli Leycano	37,590	15.64
PDP–Laban	Peter Alfaro	36,948	15.37
Lakas	Bunny Villarosa-Kalaw	16,115	6.70
NPC	Jojo Melgar	12,191	5.07
Total votes		240,315	100
PDDS gain from Liberal			

=== Provincial Board ===
Party	Votes	%	Seats
Liberal	338,048	37.49	3
PDDS	308,305	34.20	5
Lakas	64,165	7.12	1
Nacionalista	37,587	4.17	1
Reporma	36,710	4.07	–
PDP-Laban	32,018	3.55	–
NPC	21,818	2.42	–
Partido Pederal ng Maharlika	11,666	1.29	–
Independent	51,291	5.69	–
Ex officio seats			4
Total	901,608	100.00	14

==== 1st District ====
Occidental Mindoro Provincial Board Election at Occidental Mindoro's 1st District
Party	Candidate	Votes	%
Liberal	AJ Rebong	59,318	12.68
Liberal	Jun Tejoso	51,347	10.98
PDDS	Ryan Sioson	48,890	10.45
Liberal	E-K Almero	47,642	10.18
PDDS	Mangyan Masangkay	45,056	9.63
PDDS	Obet Dawates	44,909	9.60
Liberal	Jun Abeleda	39,395	8.42
Liberal	Arjay Zoleta	37,347	7.98
Independent	JR Tria	27,443	5.86
PDDS	Florefe Chua	19,967	4.27
Lakas	Kang Bina Tria	18,539	3.96
Reporma	Ronie Alegria	17,431	3.72
PDP–Laban	Lloyd Peter Tajonera	10,319	2.20
Total votes		467,603	100

==== 2nd District ====
Occidental Mindoro Provincial Board Election at Occidental Mindoro's 2nd District
Party	Candidate	Votes	%
PDDS	Coco Mendiola	56,425	13.00
Lakas	Kendi Villaroza	45,626	10.51
Nacionalista	Uly Javier	37,587	8.66
PDDS	Alex Del Valle	36,225	8.34
PDDS	Nathaniel Cruz	35,685	8.22
Liberal	Michael Rogas	34,076	7.85
Liberal	Bing Bong Garcia	27,351	6.30
Liberal	Roy Balleza	23,485	5.41
PDDS	Ramon Quilit	21,148	4.87
Independent	Dominador Jaravata Jr.	19,582	4.51
Reporma	Jake Balagot	19,279	4.44
Liberal	Boy Dimaano	18,087	4.16
NPC	Baldo Melgar	17,677	4.07
PPM	Macky Dela Cruz	11,666	2.68
PDP–Laban	Rolando Basilio	7,141	1.64
PDP–Laban	Mario Argel	5,947	1.37
PDP–Laban	Joe Vidal	5,157	1.18
NPC	Mark Joseph Morales	4,141	0.95
PDP–Laban	Santi Reyes	3,454	0.79
Independent	Doming de Guzman	2,570	0.59
Independent	Lio Sandoval	1,696	0.39
Total votes		434,005	100

=== Municipal elections ===
==== Abra de Ilog ====
Abra de Ilog Mayoral Election
Party	Candidate	Votes	%
Liberal	Meg Constantino	7,785	49.55
PDP–Laban	Monet Alcantara	6,162	39.22
PDDS	Askoy Quiñones	1,469	9.35
Independent	Ronie Pacheco	294	1.87
Total votes		15,710	100.00

Abra de Ilog Vice Mayoral Election
Party	Candidate	Votes	%
Liberal	Boyet Quito	8,069	57.15
PDDS	Rusel De Jesus	6,050	42.85
Total votes		14,119	100.00

==== Calintaan ====
Calintaan Mayoral Election
Party	Candidate	Votes	%
PDDS	Dante Esteban	6,939	50.03
Liberal	Eric Labrador	6,930	49.97
Total votes		13,869	100.00

Calintaan Vice Mayoral Election
Party	Candidate	Votes	%
Liberal	George Oreiro	4,899	36.02
PDDS	Lamberto Guiral	4,554	33.49
PDP–Laban	Erick Garcia	4,146	30.49
Total votes		13,599	100.00

==== Looc ====
Looc Mayoral Election
Party	Candidate	Votes	%
Liberal	Marlon Dela Torre	4,190	66.20
PDDS	Nestor Tria	2,139	33.80
Total votes		6,329	100.00

Looc Vice Mayoral Election
Party	Candidate	Votes	%
Liberal	Pepe Novelo	3,608	58.35
PDDS	Leo Tristan	2,575	41.65
Total votes		6,183	100.00

==== Lubang ====
Lubang Mayoral Election
Party	Candidate	Votes	%
Liberal	Mike Orayani	5,905	53.06
Reporma	JMS Sanchez	5,224	46.94
Total votes		11,129	100.00

Lubang Vice Mayoral Election
Party	Candidate	Votes	%
Reporma	Boyet Guimba	5,914	54.43
Liberal	Wilfredo Belza	4,952	45.57
Total votes		10,866	100.00

==== Magsaysay ====
Magsaysay Mayoral Election
Party	Candidate	Votes	%
Liberal	Jun-Jun Tria	11,732	60.55
PDDS	Bing Barrera	7,645	39.45
Total votes		19,377	100.00

Magsaysay Vice Mayoral Election
Party	Candidate	Votes	%
Nacionalista	Benjie Benoza	9,375	50.19
PDDS	Ayok Santos	9,305	49.81
Total votes		18,680	100.00

==== Mamburao ====
Mamburao Mayoral Election
Party	Candidate	Votes	%
Liberal	Lyn Tria	13,988	58.82
PDDS	Kap Ricky Pantoja	9,680	40.70
Independent	Erick Garcia	115	0.48
Total votes		23,783	100.00

Mamburao Vice Mayoral Election
Party	Candidate	Votes	%
Independent	Pa Jun Montales	15,508	70.57
Liberal	Big-J Panaligan	6,466	29.43
Total votes		21,974	100.00

==== Paluan ====
Paluan Mayoral Election
Party	Candidate	Votes	%
PDDS	Michael Adobo Diaz	6,155	55.32
Aksyon	Abe Pangilinan	4,971	44.68
Total votes		11,126	100.00

Paluan Vice Mayoral Election
Party	Candidate	Votes	%
PDDS	Jasmin Fernandez	6,316	58.12
Aksyon	Cherry San Agustin	4,552	41.88
Total votes		10,868	100.00

==== Rizal ====
Rizal Mayoral Election
Party	Candidate	Votes	%
Nacionalista	Sonny Pablo	13,765	68.02
PDDS	Liberty Valdez	6,472	31.98
Total votes		20,237	100.00

Rizal Vice Mayoral Election
Party	Candidate	Votes	%
PDDS	Marcelino Dela Cruz	9,946	51.10
Nacionalista	Airene Cabanela	9,518	48.90
Total votes		19,464	100.00

==== Sablayan ====
Sablayan Mayoral Election
Party	Candidate	Votes	%
NUP	Bong Marquez	24,314	58.49
Liberal	Andres Dangeros	17,255	41.51
Total votes		41,569	100.00

Sablayan Vice Mayoral Election
Party	Candidate	Votes	%
NUP	Edwin Mintu	25,679	63.83
Liberal	Bong Urieta	14,549	36.17
Total votes		40,228	100.00

==== San Jose ====
San Jose Mayoral Election
Party	Candidate	Votes	%
PDDS	Rey Ladaga	33,533	48.94
Liberal	Michelle Festin-Rivera	18,024	26.31
Independent	Bobot Chua	9,728	14.20
Aksyon	Roderick Agas	6,961	10.16
Independent	Senen Erandio	267	0.39
Total votes		68,513	100.00

San Jose Vice Mayoral Election
Party	Candidate	Votes	%
PDDS	Sonny Javier	40,327	63.48
Liberal	Jun-Jun Malilay	21,949	34.55
Independent	Eduardo Malabay Jr.	1,253	1.97
Total votes		63,529	100.00

==== Santa Cruz ====
Santa Cruz Mayoral Election
Party	Candidate	Votes	%
Reporma	Ernie Torreliza	12,216	60.09
PDP–Laban	Boy Abeleda	7,113	34.99
PPP	Daphne Isidro	904	4.45
Independent	Rex De Jose	74	0.36
Independent	Cefering Faildonio	23	0.11
Total votes		20,330	100.00

Santa Cruz Vice Mayoral Election
Party	Candidate	Votes	%
Reporma	Mark Galsim	10,490	53.00
PDDS	Felimon Galsim	8,393	42.41
Lakas	Jover Viray	618	3.12
Independent	Arnel Loredo	290	1.47
Total votes		19,791	100.00
