= Girlie Villarosa =

Filipino politician (1943–2021)

Maria Amelita Villarosa
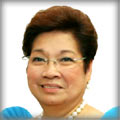
- Official portrait, 2010

Deputy Speaker of the House of Representatives
- In office July 23, 2007 – June 30, 2010

Member of the Philippine House of Representatives from Occidental Mindoro's at-large congressional district
- In office June 30, 1998 – August 29, 2000
- Preceded by: Jose Tapales Villarosa
- Succeeded by: Ricardo Quintos
- In office June 30, 2004 – June 30, 2013
- Preceded by: Josephine Sato
- Succeeded by: Josephine Sato

Personal details
- Born: Ma. Amelita A. Calimbas; May 30, 1943
- Died: May 30, 2021 (aged 78) Metro Manila, Philippines
- Party: Lakas
- Spouse: Jose Tapales Villarosa

Maria Amelita "Girlie" A. Calimbas-Villarosa (May 30, 1943 – May 30, 2021) was a Filipino politician who was a representative of Occidental Mindoro in the House of Representatives.

== Political career ==
Maria Amelita Villarosa, known by her nickname Girlie, was first elected as representative of Occidental Mindoro's lone district in the House of Representatives in 1998 for the 11th Congress. However she lost the seat, after Ricardo Quintos won an election protest against her on August 29, 2000. She was forced to concede the seat to Quintos who represented the province until the 11th Congress' dissolution in 2001. In her first stint as a congresswoman, she was involved in crafting a law that which led to the pilot testing of a computerized election system in 1998 in select provinces which in turn paved way for the automated national elections in 2010.

Villarosa would return to the House of Representatives in the 13th Congress after her election as Occidental Mindoro's representative in 2004. She would be a member of the lower legislature for two more terms covering the 14th and 15th Congress. She was named as the first woman deputy speaker of the House of Representatives during the 14th Congress and senior deputy minority leader in the 15th Congress.

As deputy speaker, she supervised the lower house's Social Services Cluster which composed of twelve standing committees in the 14th Congress at that time. The cluster produced eight national laws.

Among her bills she filed as a member which eventually became law were the Girl Scouts Philippine Charter and the Social Security Condonation Law.

== Death ==
Villarosa died on May 30, 2021, which coincides with her 78th birthday. She died of aneurysm while receiving treatment in a hospital in Metro Manila.

== Personal life ==
Villarosa is part of a political family who was influential in Occidental Mindoro. She was married to Jose Tapales Villarosa, who himself was also a member in the House of Representative and governor of Occidental Mindoro.
