= Mario Gene Mendiola =

Filipino politician (died 2021)

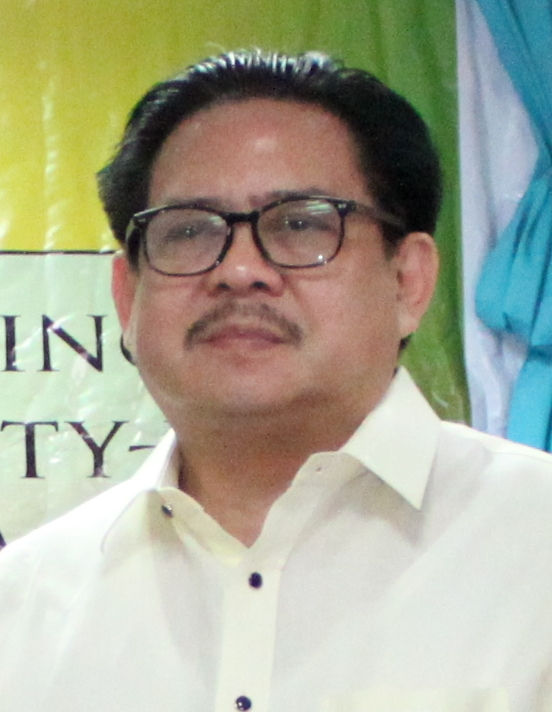
- Mendiola in 2017

Member of the Philippine House of Representatives from Occidental Mindoro
- In office June 30, 1987 – June 30, 1992
- Preceded by: Pedro Mendiola (as Regular Batasang Pambansa member)
- Succeeded by: Jose Villarosa

7th Governor of Occidental Mindoro
- In office June 30, 2013 – June 30, 2019
- Preceded by: Josephine Sato
- Succeeded by: Eduardo Gadiano

Vice Governor of Occidental Mindoro
- In office June 30, 2010 – June 30, 2013
- Governor: Josephine Sato

Personal details
- Born: 1957 or 1958
- Died: December 22, 2021 (aged 63)
- Party: PDP-Laban (2018–2021)
- Other political affiliations: Liberal (2012–2018); NPC (2009–2012); Nacionalista (1987–1992)

Mario Gene J. Mendiola was a Filipino politician who was governor of Occidental Mindoro and a representative of the province in the House of Representatives.

== Background ==
Mario Gene Mendiola became involved in politics at a young age. He joined politics after his father Pedro Mendiola, a former representative of Occidental Mindoro in the Interim Batasang Pambansa from 1978 to 1986 was killed by a gunman while delivering a speech in Sablayan in April 1986. He was elected as representative of Occidental Mindoro's lone district in the House of Representatives for the 8th Congress which lasted from 1987 to 1992.

Mario Mendiola would get elected as vice governor of Occidental Mindoro in 2010 serving until 2013. He was governor of the province from 2013 to 2019. In the 2013 elections, he ran under the Liberal Party, the then-ruling party.

== Death ==
Mendiola died on December 22, 2021, at 63 years old.
