= Jose Villarosa =

Filipino politician (1942–2022)

Member of the Philippine House of Representatives from Occidental Mindoro's Lone District
- In office June 30, 1992 – June 30, 1998
- Preceded by: Mario Gene Mendiola
- Succeeded by: Girlie Villarosa

6th Governor of Occidental Mindoro
- In office June 30, 2001 – June 30, 2004
- Preceded by: Josephine Sato
- Succeeded by: Josephine Sato

Personal details
- Born: Jose Tapales Villarosa; August 3, 1942
- Died: May 24, 2022 (aged 79)
- Political party: Lakas
- Spouse: Girlie Villarosa

Jose Tapales Villarosa was a Filipino politician who was governor of Occidental Mindoro and a representative of the province in the House of Representatives.

== Background ==
Villarosa served as the representative for Occidental Mindoro in the House of Representatives from 1992 to 1998 which covered both the 9th and 10th Congress. He was then elected as governor of the same province in 2001 serving the position until 2004. After his tenure, Villarosa was convicted by the Quezon City Regional Trial Court for murder allegedly being the mastermind of the killings of the sons of Ricardo Quintos, his political rival, in 1997. His conviction was overturned by the Court of Appeals on March 18, 2008, due to lack of evidence.

From 2010 to 2013, he was mayor of the town of San Jose, also in the same province. Villarosa became involved again in another controversy, when in 2016 when charges of 12 counts of graft and 12 counts of technical malversation were filed against him. He was accused of using the proceeds of the ₱2.92 million tobacco excise tax for 2010 to 2011 when he was San Jose mayor in projects that did not benefit farmer-beneficiaries.

== Death ==
Villarosa died on May 24, 2022, at age 79.

== Personal life ==
Villarosa is part of a political family who was influential in Occidental Mindoro. He was married to Maria Amelita "Girlie" Calimbas who was also a member of the House of Representatives. He became a widower when his wife died in May 2021.
