= Rizal, Occidental Mindoro =

Municipality in Occidental Mindoro, Philippines

Rizal
- Municipality
- Municipality of Rizal
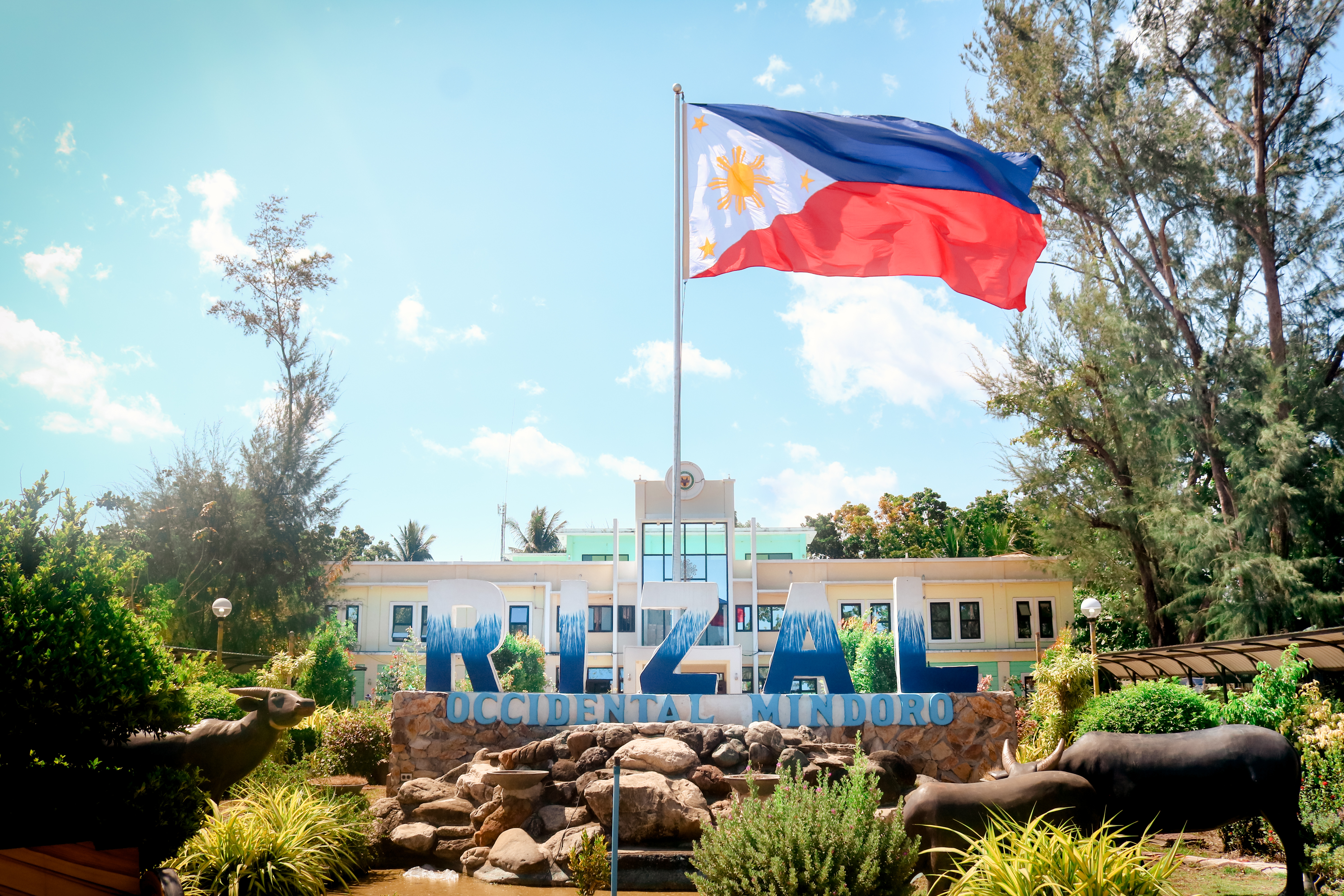
- The facade of LGU-RIZAL Complex

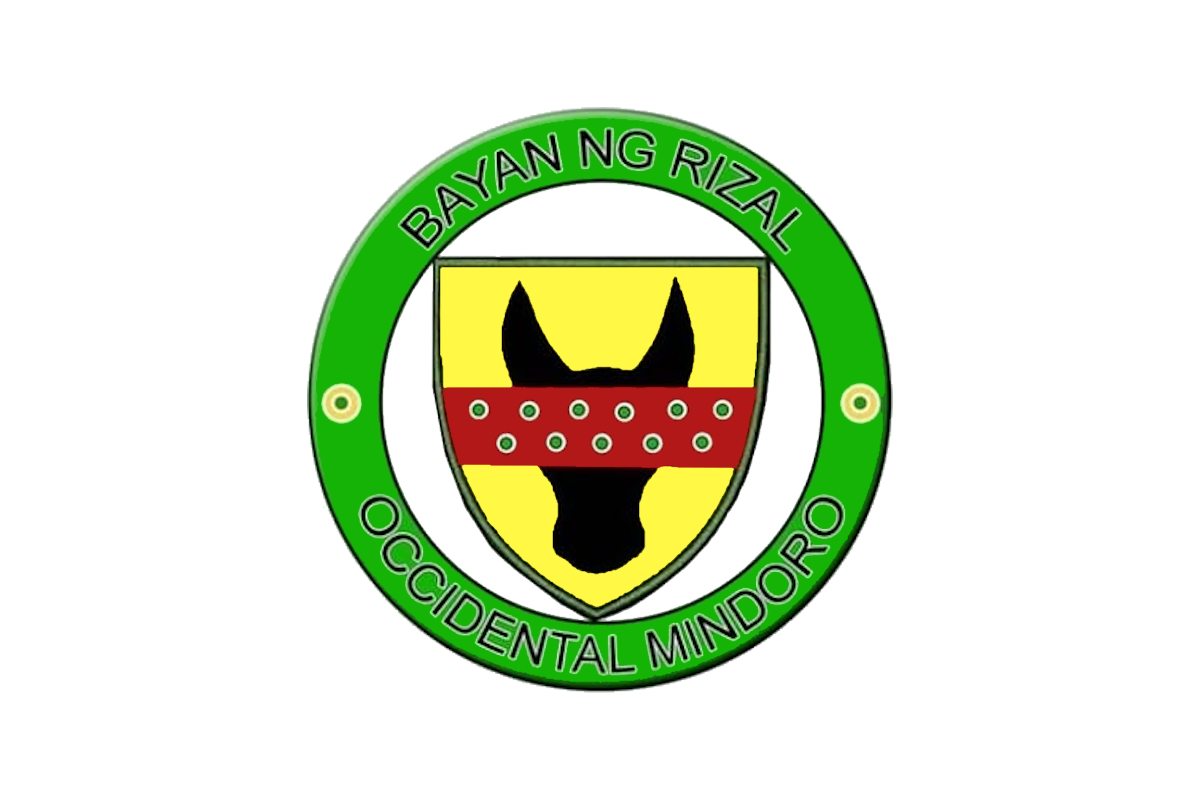
- Flag

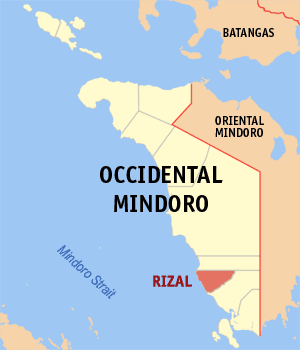
- Map of Occidental Mindoro with Rizal highlighted
- Interactive map of Rizal
- Location within the Philippines
- Coordinates: 12°28′N 120°58′E
- Country: Philippines
- Region: Mimaropa
- Province: Occidental Mindoro
- District: Lone district
- Founded: April 3, 1969
- Named for: José Rizal
- Barangays: 11 (see Barangays)

Government
  - Type: Sangguniang Bayan
  - Mayor: Ernesto C. Pablo Jr.
  - Vice Mayor: Marcelino B. Dela Cruz
  - Representative: Leody “Odie” F. Tarriela
  - Municipal Council: Members: Aries O. Valdez; Alexis James N. Guevarra; Restituto F. Awit; Ferdinand H. Arca Sr.; Edgardo C. Tamboong; Carmela S. Ovalles; Danilo E. Espartero; Ronar A. Hitones
  - Electorate: 25,125 voters (2025)

Area
  - Total: 242.50 km^{2} (93.63 sq mi)
- Elevation: 5.0 m (16.4 ft)
- Highest elevation: 53 m (174 ft)
- Lowest elevation: 0 m (0 ft)

Population (2024 census)
  - Total: 40,319
  - Density: 166.26/km^{2} (430.62/sq mi)
  - Households: 9,622

Economy
  - Income class: 2nd municipal income class
  - Poverty incidence: 23.16% (2023)
  - Revenue: ₱ 232.3 million (2024)
  - Assets: ₱ 419.2 million (2024)
  - Expenditure: ₱ 231.1 million (2024)
  - Liabilities: ₱ 123.1 million (2024)

Service provider
  - Electricity: Occidental Mindoro Electric Cooperative (OMECO)
- Time zone: UTC+8 (PST)
- ZIP code: 5103
- PSGC: 1705108000
- IDD : area code: +63 (0)43
- Native languages: Ratagnon; Tagalog

Rizal, officially the Municipality of Rizal (Tagalog: Bayan ng Rizal), is a municipality in the province of Occidental Mindoro, Philippines. According to the 2024 census, it has a population of 40,319 people.

== History ==
Before the coming of the Spaniards to the Philippines, the area which comprises Rizal was covered with forests. Later on, a few families of tribal Filipinos, known as Ratagnons, settled near the mouth of a river which was called Bogsanga. According to the Hanunoos, another group of tribal Filipinos, living on the hills, about ten kilometers west of Bogsanga, the original name of the river was Bisanga, a word from their dialect which means "It branched out." They gave the river that name for the said body of water came from two sources.

Political leaders of San Jose, Occidental Mindoro felt that the barrios between Busuanga and Lumintao River should be created as another municipality. In anticipation of the creation of a new town, residents of Barrio Limlim decided to change the name of their community to Rizal. They expressed their desire that their barrio would be made as the center of the town.

When Pedro Medalla Sr. was elected in 1965 as representative of Occidental Mindoro, one of the bills he filed in Congress was the creation of the municipality of Rizal. Through his effort, Republic Act No. 5460 was passed by Congress and signed into law by President Ferdinand Marcos. Rizal became a municipality on April 3, 1969. Ten barrios composed the new town. They were Adela, Rumbang, Salvacion, Magui, Magsikap, San Pedro, Santo Nino, Pitogo, Aguas and Rizal (Limlim).

== Geography ==
Rizal is 153 kilometres (95 mi) from Mamburao and 249 kilometres (155 mi) from Calapan.

=== Barangays ===
Rizal is politically subdivided into 11 barangays. Each barangay consists of puroks and some have sitios.

- Adela
- Aguas
- Magsikap
- Malawaan
- Pitogo
- Rizal
- Rumbang
- Salvacion
- San Pedro
- Santo Niño
- Manoot

=== Climate ===
Climate data for Rizal, Occidental Mindoro
Month	Jan	Feb	Mar	Apr	May	Jun	Jul	Aug	Sep	Oct	Nov	Dec	Year
Mean daily maximum °C (°F)	30 (86)	31 (88)	32 (90)	32 (90)	32 (90)	31 (88)	30 (86)	29 (84)	29 (84)	29 (84)	30 (86)	30 (86)	30 (87)
Mean daily minimum °C (°F)	21 (70)	21 (70)	22 (72)	22 (72)	24 (75)	25 (77)	25 (77)	25 (77)	25 (77)	24 (75)	23 (73)	22 (72)	23 (74)
Average precipitation mm (inches)	30 (1.2)	26 (1.0)	39 (1.5)	58 (2.3)	192 (7.6)	283 (11.1)	341 (13.4)	323 (12.7)	317 (12.5)	231 (9.1)	119 (4.7)	56 (2.2)	2,015 (79.3)
Average rainy days	10.3	8.3	12.4	16.3	23.5	27.1	28.4	27.3	27.6	26.3	19.2	13.6	240.3
Source: Meteoblue

== Demographics ==
Population census of Rizal
Year	Pop.	±% p.a.
1970	12,108	—
1975	14,938	+4.30%
1980	18,609	+4.49%
1990	23,379	+2.31%
1995	27,112	+2.81%
2000	29,785	+2.04%
2007	32,065	+1.02%
2010	34,458	+2.65%
2015	38,263	+2.01%
2020	40,429	+1.17%
2024	40,319	−0.07%
Source: Philippine Statistics Authority

== Economy ==
Poverty incidence of Rizal (%)

Source: Philippine Statistics Authority

== Education ==
The Rizal Schools District Office governs all educational institutions within the municipality. It oversees the management and operations of all private and public, from primary to secondary schools.

=== Primary and elementary schools ===
- Adela Elementary School
- Adela Proper Elementary School
- Aguas Elementary School
- Albunan Elementary School
- Amaling II Elementary School
- Bato Singit Elementary School
- Jose Lopez Elementary School
- Hacienda Yap Elementary School
- Lanaban Elementary School
- Lumintao Elementary School
- Magsikap Elementary School
- Malawaan Elementary School
- Manoot Elementary School
- Mendigorin Elementary School
- Panlabayan Elementary School
- Pitogo Elementary School
- Rumbang Elementary School
- Salvacion Elementary School
- San Pedro Elementary School
- Sto. Niño Elementary School
- Tiktihan Elementary School

=== Secondary schools ===
- Aguas National High School
- Magsikap National High School
- Manoot National High School
- Rizal Integrated School
- Rizal National High School
