= Calintaan =

Municipality in Occidental Mindoro, Philippines

Calintaan Irirun
- Municipality
- Municipality of Calintaan
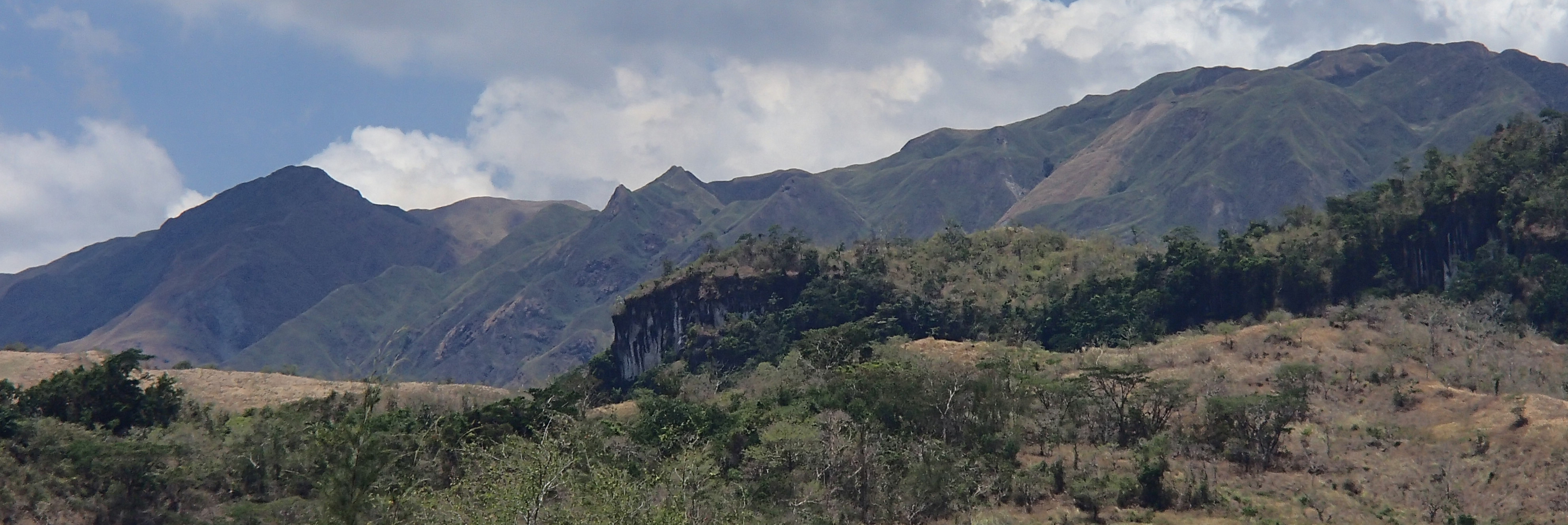
- Mountains in Calintaan

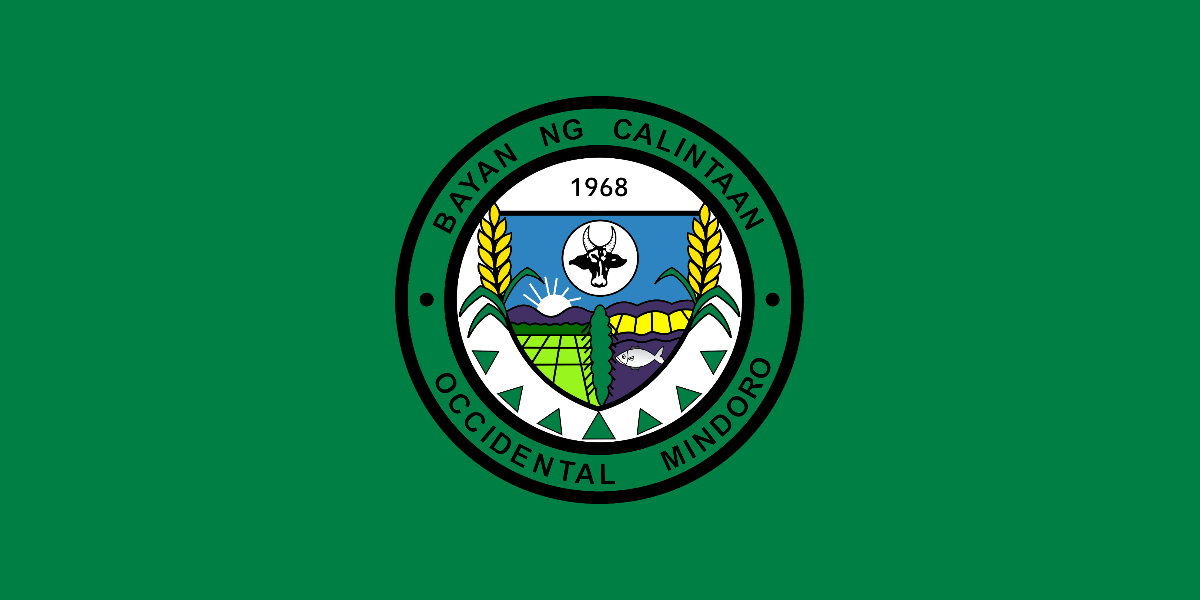
- Flag Seal

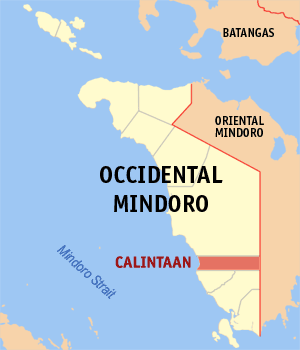
- Map of Occidental Mindoro with Calintaan highlighted
- Interactive map of Calintaan
- Location within the Philippines
- Coordinates: 12°34′32″N 120°56′34″E
- Country: Philippines
- Region: Mimaropa
- Province: Occidental Mindoro
- District: Lone district
- Founded: June 18, 1966
- Barangays: 7 (see Barangays)

Government
  - Type: Sangguniang Bayan
  - Mayor: Eric Labrador
  - Vice Mayor: George Oreiro
  - Representative: Leody “Odie” Tarriela
  - Municipal Council: Members: Rocel M. Reyes; Jay Duff Z. Labrador; Eternally O. de Lara; Reynaldo B. Dormido; Lily R. Estoya; Thomas L. Janolo; Ronaldo N. Paglicawan; Ronnie D. Importante
  - Electorate: 17,897 voters (2025)

Area
  - Total: 382.50 km^{2} (147.68 sq mi)
- Elevation: 25 m (82 ft)
- Highest elevation: 274 m (899 ft)
- Lowest elevation: 0 m (0 ft)

Population (2024 census)
  - Total: 31,088
  - Density: 81.276/km^{2} (210.50/sq mi)
  - Households: 7,405

Economy
  - Income class: 1st municipal income class
  - Poverty incidence: 23.25% (2023)
  - Revenue: ₱ 274.7 million (2024)
  - Assets: ₱ 500.1 million (2024)
  - Expenditure: ₱ 254.1 million (2024)
  - Liabilities: ₱ 149.2 million (2024)

Service provider
  - Electricity: Occidental Mindoro Electric Cooperative (OMECO)
- Time zone: UTC+8 (PST)
- ZIP code: 5102
- PSGC: 1705102000
- IDD : area code: +63 (0)43
- Native languages: Buhid; Tawbuid; Tagalog

Calintaan, officially the Municipality of Calintaan (Tagalog: Bayan ng Calintaan), is a municipality in the province of Occidental Mindoro, Philippines. According to the 2024 census, it has a population of 31,088 people.

== History ==
=== Spanish colonial era ===
Ililin is the first village mentioned in the history of Calintaan; this village is now believed to be Barangay Iriron based on its location in the old maps. Records left by the Jesuits in 1666 mentioned that adults 20 to 24 years old were baptized in Ililin. The village is recorded as belonging to the Parish of Mangarin in 1733.

In the pre-dawn hours of October 23, 1739, 100 Moro pirates aboard five bancas laid siege to the village. Most of the residents escaped, but a few villagers and a visiting missionary were captured by the pirates and brought to Jolo. Word reached the Order of Augustinian Recollects in 1740 that the missionary, Fr. Leon de San Jose, has been killed.

In 1754, pirates again attacked Ililin, but the people beat the pirates into retreat. The pirates instead attacked Dongon, a neighboring village. Later records reveal that Ililin was eventually destroyed by the Moros. The residents migrated to plains and mountains further from the coast. In 1819, by which time Ililin was being called Iriron, a new parish was created with a population of 1,300 persons. Pirate attacks continued to plague the region, and residents continued to leave until, by 1829, the population had dwindled to 150. Only a few buildings were left, among them the church, a convent and the prison.

By 1871, Spain had managed to control the problem of piracy throughout the Philippines, and the villages of Mindoro repopulated. In the area called Magarang a cattle ranch was set up by a Spaniard named Pascual Ledesma. This ranch was purchased by the Augustinian Recollects in 1894. The Order brought in a new administrator, Espiridion Jiminez, who would become "capital del pueblo" when the ranch became a pueblo in 1896.

After some disagreement with the friars, Capitan Jimenez relocated his family and followers—including the families Pascual, Labrador, Pudan, Romaquin, Picarzo and Isidro-to found a new community, in a place they called Calintaan after the word for the leeches which they encountered there.

During the revolution against the Spanish authorities, Capt. Jimenez, Isidro Zamora, Pedro Dapil and Marcelino Vitang were among the leaders of the local rebellion. They joined forces with Captain Pedro Fernandez' revolutionaries from Sablayan. Also in Fernandez' group were Vicente Gallembas, Tiago Dangeros, Carpo Urieta, Docoy Eniega, Vicente Dangcoding, Tiago Dantayana and Paeng Dawatis. With the approval of other revolutionary leaders, including the leaders of West Mindoro and Calapan, Jiminez and Fernandez combined their groups to march on El Pueblo de Magarang in 1897, where the 75-man company captured the Spaniards and missionary friars.

Antoon Postma, a Dutch researcher, indicated that the captured men were held for a time at Magarang before being sent, by way of Paluan, to Taysan, Batangas. The captives were held for several years before the Americans occupied Mindoro and freed them in 1904.

=== American invasion era ===
After the end of the Spanish regime, Calintaan became progressive, with Eligio Jimenez serving as the first appointed cabeza de barangay. Sablayan became a municipality during the American period, holding jurisdiction over barrios including Iriron and Calintaan. The municipal board of Sablayan was dominated by representatives from Calintaan. Some of these representatives were Leoncio Panganiban, Benigno Lontoc, Juanito Gonzales, Juan Credo, Pedro Credo, Agustin Esmelo, Francisco Esmelo, Eriberto Lineses, Atanacio Encomio, Pedro Romaquin, Constancio Villarosa, Cornelio Gasmin, Aniceto Apigo, Alberto Obispo, Amador Ulay and Vicente Isidro. Calintaan saw its first primary school open in 1914. During this period, the residents of Calintaan requested that they be established as a municipality themselves rather than sitting as a barrio of Sablayan. They felt that Sablayan was too far away for easy governance. The petition was heard in Calapan, which at that time served as Provincial Council of all of Mindoro. Although some from the Sablayan municipal council supported the petitioners, their request was ultimately declined because it was feared that Calintaan did not have enough income to maintain a municipal government.

In 1940, a resident of Calintaan, Pedro Gonzales, became mayor by a wide margin of Sablayan, becoming the first from Calintaan to do so.

=== World War II ===
Less than a year after Gonzales' election, World War II caused most of the residents of Calintaan to evacuate, including the mayor himself. Calintaan was occupied by the Japanese in April 1942, at which point all evacuated houses were burned. Men who had remained during the evacuations were forced to work in San Jose at a military camp. On December 15, 1944, the island was liberated by Allied Forces, led by U.S. Brigadier General William Dunckel. From that point until May 1943, the American forces used the area of Sitio Bulangcog, Barrio Iriron, for a radar station with which they could monitor enemy warplanes.

=== Post-War ===
Occidental Mindoro and Oriental Mindoro were formalized as provinces after the war on November 15, 1950. The population of Mindoro boomed as residents arrived from elsewhere, and the forests were cut from surrounding areas. Communal irrigation systems were built for ricefields. The indigenous Tau-Buhid or Batangan tribe relocated to the mountains. Calintaan itself became a municipality distinct from Sablayan on June 18, 1966, with governance of an area of 38,250 hectares, including the barrios of Concepcion, Iriron, New Dagupan and Tanyag. In response to public demand, a high school was also opened in 1966, located in Poblacion, Calintaan. Calintaan's first municipal mayor was Felomino Jiminez, elected on November 14, 1967.

=== The new town ===
In 1970, the barrio high school became a municipal high school, with extension classes opening at Tanyag, Iriron and Concepcion. At this time, the population of the Calintaan jurisdiction was 7,949. Due to continued immigration, the additional barrios of Poypoy and Malpalon were added to Calintaan. Home of the indigenous population, these have subsequently become Barangays. National parks were established in Poypoy, Calintaan and Sablayan to protect endangered species, including Mindoro's unique wild animals, the tamaraw. National agencies stepped in for other work as well, including improving irrigation.

In 1971, during the first year of service of Calintaan Mayor Amador Sison, the Philippines entered a state of martial law. The national government then saw to additional improvements in Calintaan, including enlarging the canals so as to provide better irrigation and building roads and bridges. After Sison's death in April 1977, the office was inhabited by Vice Mayor Romeo Calabio, who in three years of service oversaw the addition of a health center and the initiation of a central town water system, before the next election on January 30, 1980. Following that election, Felomino Jimenez returned as municipal mayor to continue civic improvements.

Important to the region, an Apostolic Vicariate of San Jose in Mindoro was created at St. Joseph Cathedral, San Jose, Occidental Mindoro. On July 1, 1983, Bishop Vicente Manuel, a grandson of Espiridion Jimenez, became its first Vicar Apostolic. Bishop Manuel was active in overseeing the implementation of programs in Calintaan engineered to improve the lives of Catholic residents.

Following Mayor Jimenez's death on August 30, 1985, Vice Mayor Apolinario Bullagay entered office.

=== Revolution ===
All of the officials in Calintaan were, like the rest of local officials in the Philippines, replaced by President Corazon Aquino following the peaceful revolution at EDSA in 1986. Edgardo Gagtan was appointed as OIC-Mayor. He initiated the construction of the public market, school buildings and communal faucets in some barangays. The municipality of Calintaan endured turbulent times, as the New People’s Army (NPA) attacked it and its barrios as part of their campaign against the government. The Philippine government countered the revolutionaries by conducting seminars to promote its aims and granting amnesty and awarding land to those who chose to reform. After several years, rebel unrest in Calintaan quieted.

The area quickly went through several mayors following 1996 before Rolando Sison was elected in 1991, and civic construction continued. Meanwhile, the area's high school had continued to grow until, along with the barangay schools at Tanyag, Iriron and Concepcion, it became a national high school (CNHS) by executive order of Aquino. Sison's successor, attorney Eric Labrador (who had briefly served during those years of unrest) returned to office in 1995 and continued to oversee construction until the 1998 election of Renato Paulino. During Sison's term, the Apostolic Vicariate formed a farmers' cooperative and instructed area farmers in Integrated Pest Management (IPM).

=== The new millennium ===
Under Paulino's term as mayor, the area continued to expand, with new roads and public buildings, including a nursery and public market. He also oversaw the initiation of a gymnasium, which is not yet completed.

A rebel group known as the New Peoples Army (NPA) is still a threat to the peace of Calintaan notwithstanding governmental efforts to sway leftist groups to democracy.

In 2007, Lily Racca Estoya became the mayor, with former Mayor Paulino, who had just completed his third term, as her running mate.

== Geography ==
Calintaan has a total land area of 383 square kilometres (148 sq mi). It is covered in vast rice paddies and coryphas, which are used for making buri. The land area is around 82% mountainous with the rest of it being mostly coastal plains and hills.

Calintaan is 136 kilometres (85 mi) from Mamburao.

=== Climate ===
Climate data for Calintaan, Occidental Mindoro
Month	Jan	Feb	Mar	Apr	May	Jun	Jul	Aug	Sep	Oct	Nov	Dec	Year
Mean daily maximum °C (°F)	30 (86)	31 (88)	32 (90)	32 (90)	31 (88)	30 (86)	29 (84)	29 (84)	29 (84)	29 (84)	30 (86)	30 (86)	30 (86)
Mean daily minimum °C (°F)	21 (70)	21 (70)	22 (72)	24 (75)	25 (77)	25 (77)	25 (77)	25 (77)	25 (77)	24 (75)	23 (73)	22 (72)	24 (74)
Average precipitation mm (inches)	30 (1.2)	26 (1.0)	39 (1.5)	58 (2.3)	192 (7.6)	283 (11.1)	341 (13.4)	323 (12.7)	317 (12.5)	231 (9.1)	119 (4.7)	56 (2.2)	2,015 (79.3)
Average rainy days	10.3	8.3	12.4	16.3	23.5	27.1	28.4	27.3	27.6	26.3	19.2	13.6	240.3
Source: Meteoblue (Use with caution: this is modeled/calculated data, not measured locally.)

=== Barangays ===
Calintaan is politically subdivided into 7 barangays. Each barangay consists of puroks and some have sitios.

- Concepcion
- Iriron
- Malpalon
- New Dagupan
- Poblacion
- Poypoy
- Tanyag

== Demographics ==
Population census of Calintaan
Year	Pop.	±% p.a.
1970	7,949	—
1975	10,740	+6.22%
1980	14,416	+6.06%
1990	18,117	+2.31%
1995	21,687	+3.43%
2000	23,503	+1.74%
2007	26,779	+1.82%
2010	28,148	+1.83%
2015	29,826	+1.11%
2020	30,190	+0.26%
2024	31,088	+0.71%
Source: Philippine Statistics Authority

=== Language ===
Tagalog is the main language spoken in Calintaan, being spoken by approximately 62% of the household population, followed by Ilocano which is spoken by about 22%.

== Economy ==
Poverty incidence of Calintaan (%)

Source: Philippine Statistics Authority

The economy of Calintaan is mainly agricultural, and its major crop is rice. Other crops produced and sold in Calintaan include corn, legumes, coconuts, and bananas. Practices such as fishing, livestock, poultry, banana processing (banana chips) and buricraft (the production of goods made from buri fibers such as buntal) are also important to the economy.

== Education ==
The Calintaan Schools District Office governs all educational institutions within the municipality. It oversees the management and operations of all private and public, from primary to secondary schools.

=== Primary and elementary schools ===
- Alfonso Valerio Elementary School
- Alipondo Elementary School
- Bagong Silang Elementary School
- Balangabong Elementary School
- Bulangcog Elementary School
- Calintaan Central School
- Concepcion Elementary School
- Filomeno Jimenez Elementary School
- Geronimo M. Apolonio Sr. Elementary School
- Gutad Adventist Elementary School
- Iriron Elementary School
- Layaban Elementary School
- Malpalon Elementary School
- Nayong Kalikasan Elementary School
- Nilapso Elementary School
- New Dagupan Elementary School
- Poypoy Elementary School
- Tamisan Minority School
- Tanyag Adventist Elementary School
- Tanyag Elementary School
- Tanyag Elementary School (Annex Gutad Primary School)
- Ulango Elementary School
- Vicente Ariola Elementary School

=== Secondary schools ===
- Calintaan National High School
- Concepcion National High School
- Iriron National High School
- Malpalon National High School
- Poypoy National High School
- Tanyag National High School
