= Josephine Sato =

Filipino politician (born 1954)

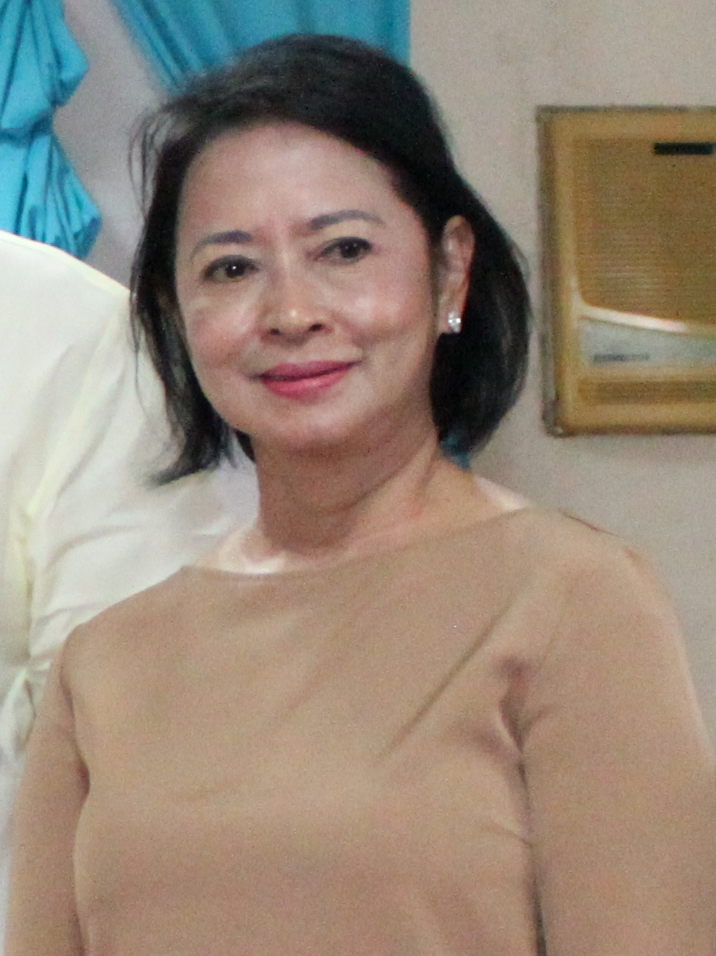
- Sato in 2017

Member of the Philippine House of Representatives from Occidental Mindoro's Lone District
- In office June 30, 2013 – June 30, 2022
- Preceded by: Girlie Villarosa
- Succeeded by: Leody Tarriela
- In office June 30, 2001 – June 30, 2004
- Preceded by: Ricardo Quintos
- Succeeded by: Girlie Villarosa

5th Governor of Occidental Mindoro
- In office June 30, 2004 – June 30, 2013
- Preceded by: Jose T. Villarosa
- Succeeded by: Mario Gene Mendiola
- In office June 30, 1992 – June 30, 2001
- Preceded by: Peter Medalla Jr.
- Succeeded by: Jose T. Villarosa

Vice Governor of Occidental Mindoro
- In office February 2, 1988 – June 30, 1992

Personal details
- Born: Josephine Ylagan Ramirez; April 29, 1954 (age 72) San Jose, Occidental Mindoro, Philippines
- Party: Liberal (2012-present)
- Other political affiliations: NPC (2004–2012); Lakas (2001–2004); Independent (1987–2001)
- Spouse: William Nobuo Sato
- Education: St. Theresa's College (BA); University of the Philippines (LLB)

Josephine Ylagan Ramirez-Sato (born April 29, 1954) is a Filipino politician. She served as a member of the Philippine House of Representatives representing the Lone District of Occidental Mindoro under the Liberal Party from 2013 to 2022.

== Education ==
Sato attended St. Theresa's College where she attained a BA Major in Political Science in 1973 where she was included at her college's dean's list. She also attended University of the Philippines where she graduated as a Bachelor of Laws and top 14 among her graduating batch in 1978.

In 1986, she accomplished a program on instructions of lawyers-international law and taxation at Harvard University School of Law and in 1987 she completed her urban studies and planning at Massachusetts Institute of Technology.

== Political career ==
In 1988, Sato was elected as vice governor of Occidental Mindoro until 1992. After her term as vice governor, she was elected as governor for three consecutive terms (1992–1995, 1995–1998, 1998–2001). She then served her first term as congresswoman at the House of Representatives from 2001–2004 and was barred by law to run for a fourth consecutive term. After Sato's first term as congresswoman, she again served for three consecutive terms as governor of her province (2004–2007, 2007–2010, 2010–2013). Then after her sixth term as governor, she was again elected as congresswoman of Occidental Mindoro.

In 2015, she was appointed as secretary general of the Liberal Party.

In 2022, she filed her candidacy for governor in the 2022 Occidental Mindoro local elections. She lost to Eduardo Gadiano after only garnering 92,208 votes.
