= Governor of Occidental Mindoro =

Local chief executive

- Gobernador ng Occidental Mindoro (Filipino)
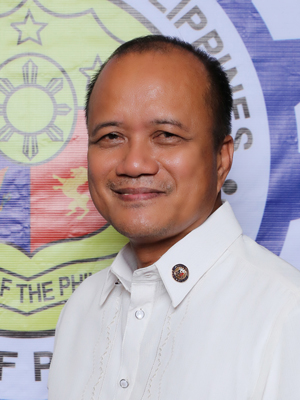
- Incumbent; Eduardo Gadiano since June 30, 2019
- Style: The Honorable
- Seat: Occidental Mindoro Provincial Capitol
- Term length: 3 years
- Inaugural holder: Federico Castillo
- Formation: 1951

The governor of Occidental Mindoro is the executive head of the province of Occidental Mindoro. The inaugural holder of the post is Federico Castillo.

== List ==
No.	Image	Governor	Term	Party
1		Federico Castillo	1951–1956	
2		Mariano Tajonera	1956–1959	
3		Arsenio Villaroza	1960–1986	
4		Peter Medalla Jr. (Note: was acting governor from 1986–1988)	1986–1992	
5		Josephine Sato	1992–2001	Lakas
6		Jose Villarosa	2001–2004	Lakas
(5)		Josephine Sato	2004–2013	NPC
7		Mario Gene Mendiola	2013–2019	Liberal
8		Eduardo Gadiano	2019–	PDDS
8		Eduardo Gadiano	2019–	PFP
