= Eduardo Gadiano =

Filipino politician (born 1963)

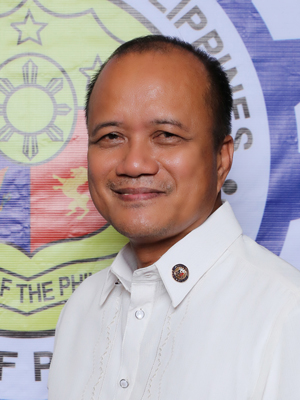

8th Governor of Occidental Mindoro
- Incumbent
- Assumed office June 30, 2019
- Preceded by: Mario Gene Mendiola

Mayor of Sablayan
- In office June 30, 2010 – June 30, 2019
- Preceded by: Godofredo B. Mintu
- Succeeded by: Andres D. Dangeros

Vice Mayor of Sablayan
- In office June 30, 2001 – June 30, 2010

Personal details
- Born: April 1, 1963 (age 63) Sablayan, Occidental Mindoro, Philippines
- Party: PFP (2023–present)
- Other political affiliations: PDDS (2018–2023); Independent (2015–2018); UNA (2012–2015); Lakas (2009–2012); NPC (2007–2009); LDP (2001–2007)
- Spouse: Susan Infante
- Website: eduardogadiano.com

Eduardo Baltazar Gadiano (born April 1, 1963) is a Filipino politician who has served as Governor of Occidental Mindoro since 2019. He is a member of the Partido Federal ng Pilipinas. He previously served as mayor of Sablayan from 2010 to 2019.

== Career ==
=== Mayor of Sablayan ===
Gadiano was also the former Mayor of Sablayan from 2010 to 2019. He also served three full terms as vice mayor prior to becoming the chief executive of the town. As presiding Officer of the Sangguniang Bayan of Sablayan, he was responsible for instating a 25-year moratorium on large scale mining. Despite this the national government granted an exploration permit to a mining company, with Gadiano as mayor of Sablayan refusing to accept the firm's occupation fee. The firm filed a case in a local court in response to Gadiano's resistance.

=== Governor of Occidental Mindoro ===
Gadiano would be elected as Governor of Occidental Mindoro in 2019, under the Pederalismo ng Dugong Dakilang Samahan (PDDS) National Political Party.

As Occidental Mindoro governor, Gadiano has reached out to the national government to intervene in the dispute between power distributor Occidental Mindoro Electric Cooperative Inc. (Omeco) and power supplier Occidental Mindoro Consolidated Power Corp. (OMCPC) to help resolve the electricity situation in the province.

In 2022 elections, he supported the candidacy of Bongbong Marcos who was eventually elected as President of the Philippines.

== Personal life ==
Gadiano is married to Susan Infante He is an Ilocano.
