= Sablayan =

Municipality in Occidental Mindoro, Philippines

- Municipality
- Municipality of Sablayan
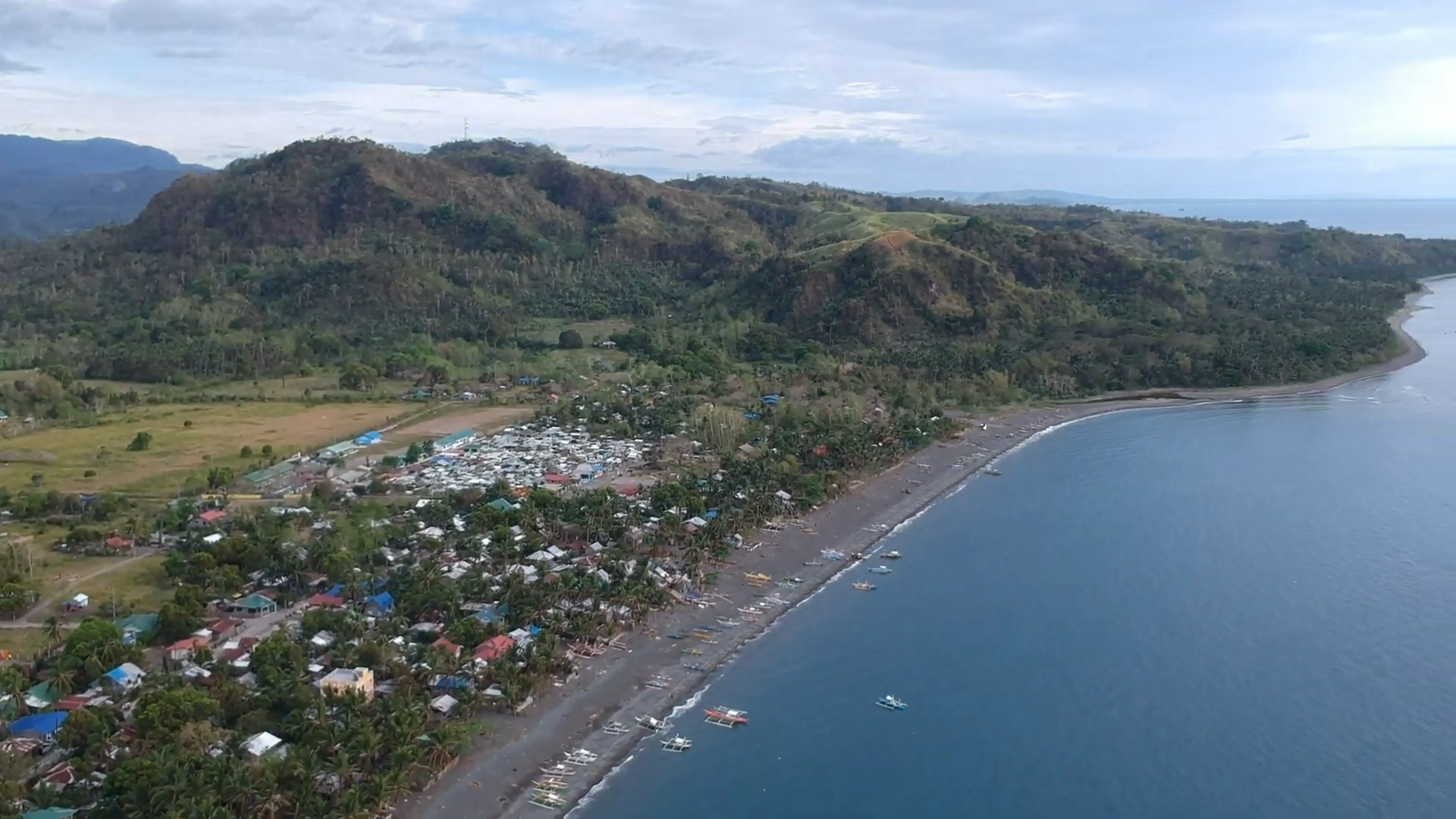
- Barangay Ligaya

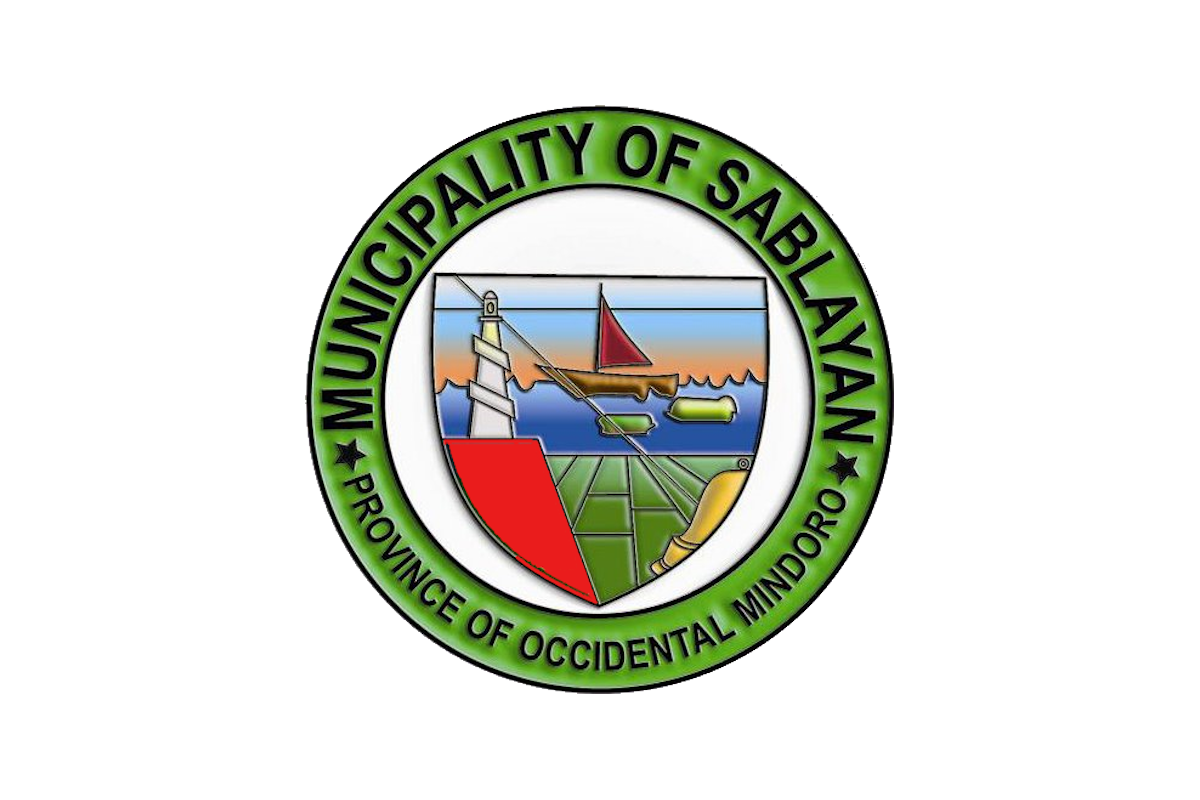
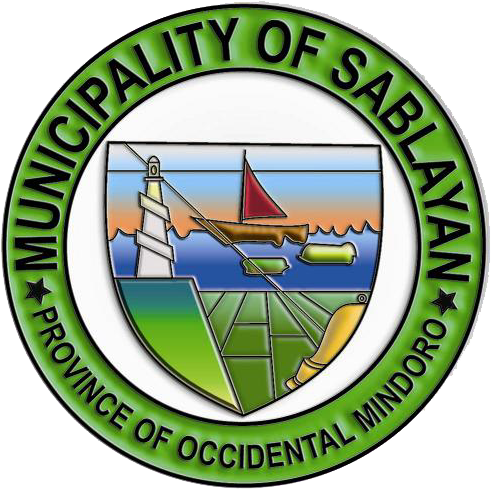
- Flag Seal
- Nickname: Heart of Mindoro
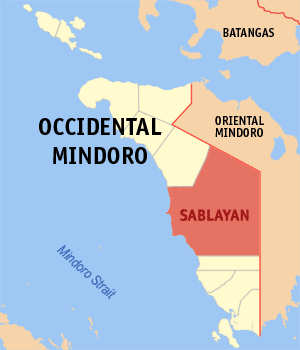
- Map of Occidental Mindoro with Sablayan highlighted
- Interactive map of Sablayan
- Location within the Philippines
- Coordinates: 12°50′34″N 120°46′30″E
- Country: Philippines
- Region: Mimaropa
- Province: Occidental Mindoro
- District: Lone district
- Founded: 1906
- Barangays: 22 (see Barangays)

Government
  - Type: Sangguniang Bayan
  - Mayor: Walter B. Marquez
  - Vice Mayor: Edwin N. Mintu
  - Representative: Leody F. Tarriela
  - Municipal Council: Members: Clarinda A. Lorenzo; Alfredo C. Ventura Jr.; Marffin B. Dulay; Manuel P. Tadeo; Conchita H. Dimaculangan; Mark Anthony O. Legaspi; Nancy M. Laudencia-Landicho; Roberto C. Lim
  - Electorate: 55,181 voters (2025)

Area
  - Total: 2,188.80 km^{2} (845.10 sq mi)
  - Rank: 1st
- Elevation: 150 m (490 ft)
- Highest elevation: 2,518 m (8,261 ft)
- Lowest elevation: 0 m (0 ft)

Population (2024 census)
  - Total: 91,406
  - Density: 41.761/km^{2} (108.16/sq mi)
  - Households: 21,709

Economy
  - Income class: 1st municipal income class
  - Poverty incidence: 25.54% (2023)
  - Revenue: ₱ 932.8 million (2024)
  - Assets: ₱ 1,771 million (2024)
  - Expenditure: ₱ 820.3 million (2024)
  - Liabilities: ₱ 213.4 million (2024)

Service provider
  - Electricity: Occidental Mindoro Electric Cooperative (OMECO)
- Time zone: UTC+8 (PST)
- ZIP code: 5104
- PSGC: 1705109000
- IDD : area code: +63 (0)43
- Native languages: Alangan; Tawbuid; Tagalog
- Website: www.sablayan.gov.ph

Sablayan (Tagalog pronunciation: [sɐ'blajan]), officially the Municipality of Sablayan (Tagalog: Bayan ng Sablayan), is a municipality in the province of Occidental Mindoro, Philippines. According to the 2024 census, it has a population of 91,406 people.

== History ==
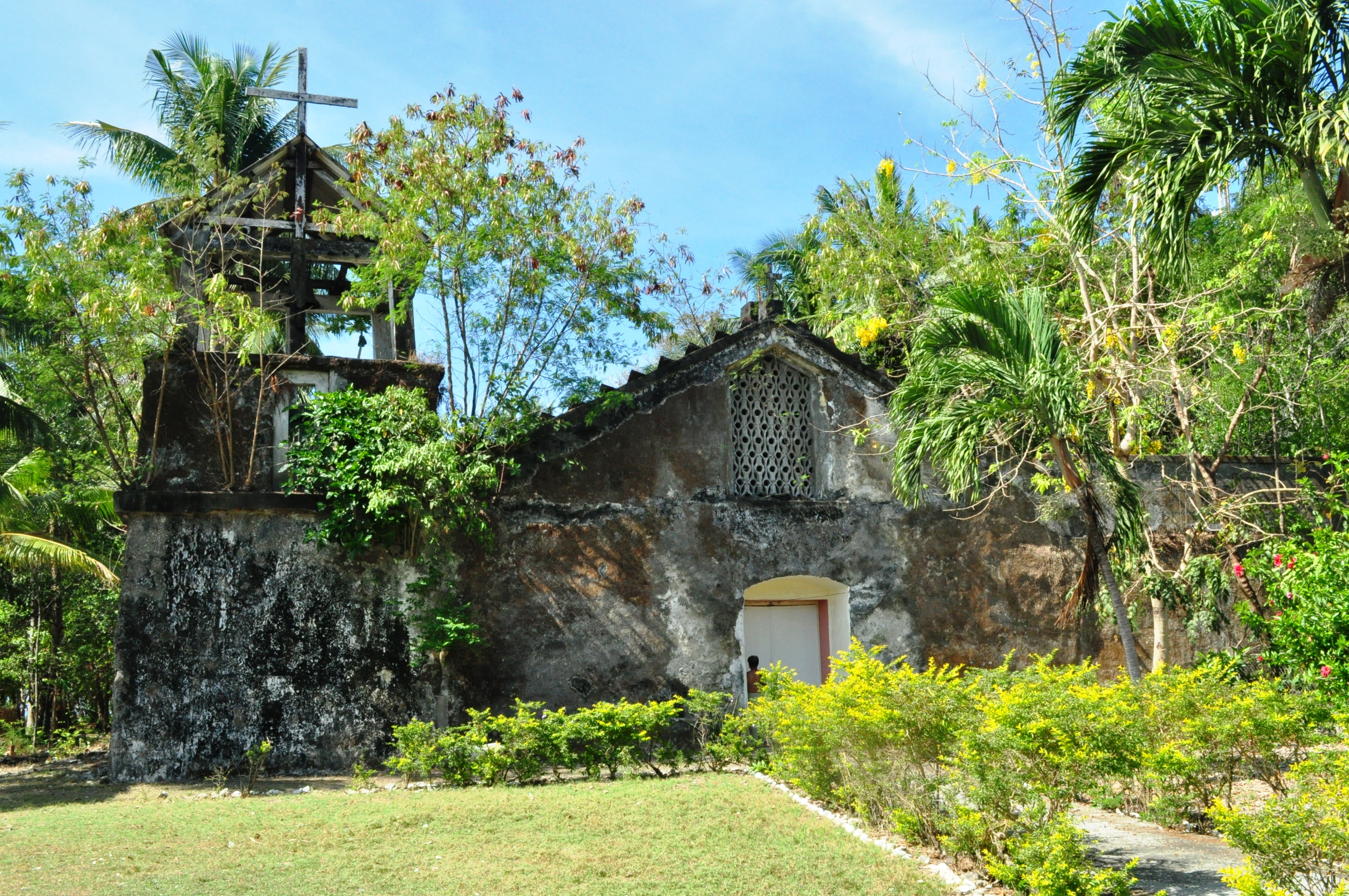
San Sebastian Parish Church, Sablayan

The town used to be called Dongon, a coastal village located currently at Barangay San Nicolas. The first accounts of the baptism of the locals under the Recollects were recorded in 1670. By 1749, Dongon became the biggest pueblo in the whole island of Mindoro in terms of population.

In 1754, the Moro pirates started attacking the town, and almost every year thereafter, until in 1791 when the Moros effectively wiped out the whole population from more than 600 inhabitants to less than 98 people.

In 1814, the inhabitants of Dongon gradually transferred to the village of Sablayan, until Dongon ceased to become a village in 1829. In 1832, the missionary friar Simeon Mendoza de la V. de Ibernalo requested the Spanish government for the exemption of the town's inhabitants from paying taxes so that they could build a stone church, convent and fort at a hilly part of the village. The church that stands today at the town may have been built from 1832 to 1835, and its advocacy was placed under San Sebastian.

In 2026, the town was declared a biosphere reserve by UNESCO.

== Geography ==
Sablayan has a total land area of 2,188.80 square kilometers, making it the largest municipality in the Philippines. The Apo Reef, North and South Pandan Islands, and a portion of Mounts Iglit–Baco National Park are part of its jurisdiction. Sablayan Penal Colony, the Philippines' largest penal facility with sprawling lot of 16,190 hectares (40,000 acres) is also located in this municipality.

Sablayan is located in the central part of Occidental Mindoro. It is bounded to the north by the municipality of Santa Cruz and the municipalities of Baco, Naujan, Victoria and Socorro all in Oriental Mindoro province; to the east by the municipalities of Pinamalayan, Gloria, Bansud, Bongabong and Mansalay also in Oriental Mindoro; to the south by the municipality of Calintaan; and to the west by the Mindoro Strait.

Sablayan is 87 kilometres (54 mi) from Mamburao.

=== Barangays ===
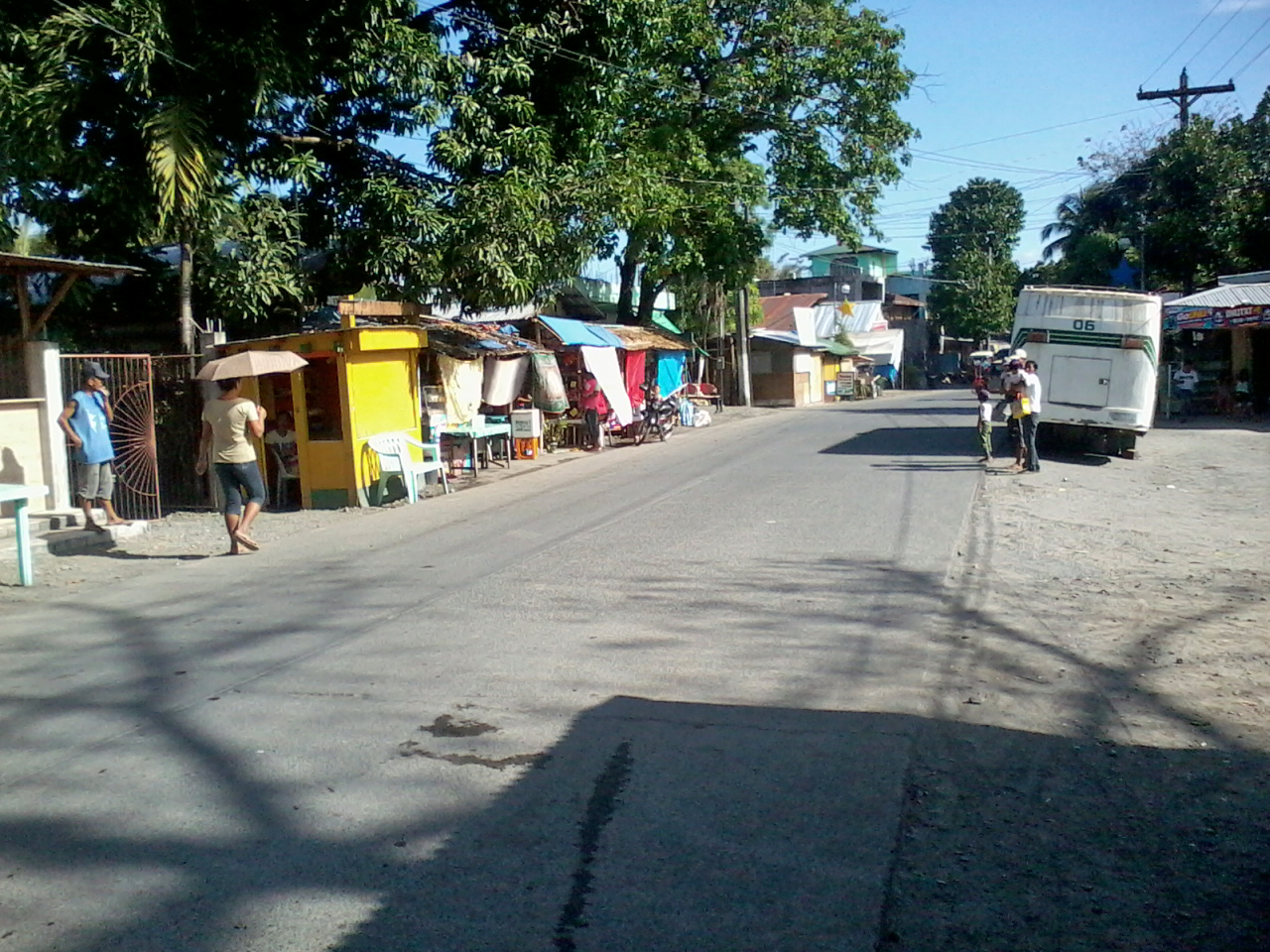
Poblacion

Sablayan is politically subdivided into 22 barangays. Each barangay consists of puroks and some have sitios.

In 1957 the following barrios were renamed: Batasan to Claudio Salgado, Hinaya to Buhay na Bato (Batong Buhay) and Iriron to San Isidro.

- Batong Buhay
- Buenavista (town proper)
- Burgos
- Claudio Salgado
- General Emilio Aguinaldo
- Ibud
- Ilvita
- Lagnas
- Ligaya
- Malisbong
- Paetan
- Pag-Asa
- Poblacion (Lumangbayan)
- San Agustin
- San Francisco
- San Nicolas
- San Vicente
- Sta. Lucia
- Sto. Niño
- Tagumpay
- Tuban
- Victoria

=== Climate ===
Climate data for Sablayan, Occidental Mindoro
Month	Jan	Feb	Mar	Apr	May	Jun	Jul	Aug	Sep	Oct	Nov	Dec	Year
Mean daily maximum °C (°F)	29 (84)	30 (86)	31 (88)	32 (90)	31 (88)	30 (86)	29 (84)	29 (84)	29 (84)	29 (84)	29 (84)	29 (84)	30 (86)
Mean daily minimum °C (°F)	21 (70)	21 (70)	22 (72)	23 (73)	25 (77)	26 (79)	25 (77)	25 (77)	25 (77)	24 (75)	23 (73)	22 (72)	24 (74)
Average precipitation mm (inches)	42 (1.7)	31 (1.2)	49 (1.9)	71 (2.8)	249 (9.8)	368 (14.5)	426 (16.8)	350 (13.8)	381 (15.0)	292 (11.5)	144 (5.7)	80 (3.1)	2,483 (97.8)
Average rainy days	10.2	8.3	11.7	15.9	25.2	27.5	28.9	27.0	27.5	26.0	18.2	13.0	239.4
Source: Meteoblue

== Demographics ==
Population census of Sablayan
Year	Pop.	±% p.a.
1918	3,078	—
1939	2,861	−0.35%
1948	3,332	+1.71%
1960	12,685	+11.78%
1970	18,256	+3.70%
1975	31,117	+11.29%
1980	36,699	+3.35%
1990	46,546	+2.41%
1995	55,573	+3.38%
2000	63,685	+2.96%
2007	70,506	+1.41%
2010	76,153	+2.84%
2015	83,169	+1.69%
2020	92,598	+2.29%
2024	91,406	−0.31%
Source: Philippine Statistics Authority

== Economy ==
Poverty incidence of Sablayan (%)

Source: Philippine Statistics Authority

== Tourism ==
=== Pinagpalang Lagusan sa Bakawanan ===
On April 15, 2024, second placer, Sablayan's Mayor Walter B. Marquez received the P20 million award from the Department of Tourism's Tourism Champions Challenge, for the development of "Pinagpalang Lagusan sa Bakawanan" (Mangrove Forest park). The tourist attraction is a 12-hectare biodiversity with 925-meter mangrove nature conservation boardwalk.

== Government ==
=== List of former chief executives ===
- Juan Daño (1907—1910)
- Santiago Dangeros (1913–1918)
- Policarpio Urieta (1919–1921)
- Benigno Lontoc (1922–1924)
- Maximo Papa (1925–1927, 1938–1940)
- Hermogenes Daño (1928–1930)
- Lucas Fernandez (1931–1933)
- Primitovo Zamora (1934–1937)
- Pedro Gonzales (1941–1947, 1972–1986)
- Paulino Legaspi Sr. (1948–1951)
- Loreto Urieta (1952–1959, 1964–1971)
- Floresto Cariaga Sr. (1959–1960)
- Leoncio Ordenes Sr. (1960–1963)
- Godofredo B. Mintu (1986–1998, 2001–2010)
- Andres D. Dangeros (1998–2001, 2019–present)
- Eduardo B. Gadiano (2010–2019)

== Culture ==
Held once a year the Dugoy Festival is a celebration of the Mangyan culture.

== Education ==
There are Sablayan schools district offices which govern all educational institutions within the municipality. They oversee the management and operations of all private and public, from primary to secondary schools. These are the Sablayan North Schools District, and Sablayan South Schools District.

=== Primary and elementary schools ===
- Alag Elementary School
- Aplaya Elementary School
- Arellano Elementary School
- Balani Minority School
- Buenavista Elementary School
- Burgos Elementary School
- Cebu Elementary School
- Claudio Salgado Elementary School
- Culasisi Minority School
- El Dorado Elementary School
- D-Shep Foundation Academy
- Foursquare Christian School
- Gen. E. Aguinaldo Elementary School
- Gen. E. Aguinaldo Elementary School (Annex)
- Guitong Elementary School
- Hosea Christian Mission School
- Inawa Panaynep Elementary School
- Lagutay Minority School
- Libagon Minority School
- Ligaya Adventist Elementary School
- Ligaya Elementary School
- Liwayway Elementary School
- Malisbong Elementary School
- Maranatha Christian Academy
- Paetan Elementary School
- Paradise Adventist Elementary School
- Payompon Elementary School
- Poblacion Elementary School
- Rang-ayan Elementary School
- Sablayan Central School
- Sablayan Prison and Penal Farm Elementary School
- Sablayan Seventh-Day Adventist Elementary School
- Sahing Elementary School
- Salvacion Elementary School
- San Agustin Adventist Elementary School
- San Agustin Elementary School
- San Francisco Elementary School
- San Miguel Elementary School
- San Nicolas Elementary School
- San Vicente Elementary School
- San Vicente Elementary School (Calumpit Annex)
- Selina Elementary School
- Sotero Baluyot Elementary School
- Sta. Lucia I Elementary School
- Sta. Lucia II Elementary School
- Sta. Rosa Elementary School
- Sto. Nino Elementary School
- Tagumpay Elementary School
- Tuban Elementary School
- Victoria Elementary School
- Yapang Elementary School

=== Secondary schools ===
- Burgos National High School
- Colegio de San Sebastian
- Ligaya National High School
- Malisbong National High School
- Paulino Legaspi, Sr. Memorial National High School
- Prudencio L. Gadiano National High School
- Sablayan National Comprehensive High School
- Sablayan National Comprehensive High School (Sta. Lucia Annex)
- Sablayan National Comprehensive High School (Claudio Salgado Annex)
- San Francisco National High School
- San Vicente National High School
- San Vicente National High School (Yapang Annex)
- Tagumpay National High School
- Victoria National High School
- Victoria National High School (Ilvita Annex)
