= Santa Cruz, Occidental Mindoro =

Municipality in Occidental Mindoro, Philippines

Santa Cruz
- Municipality
- Municipality of Santa Cruz
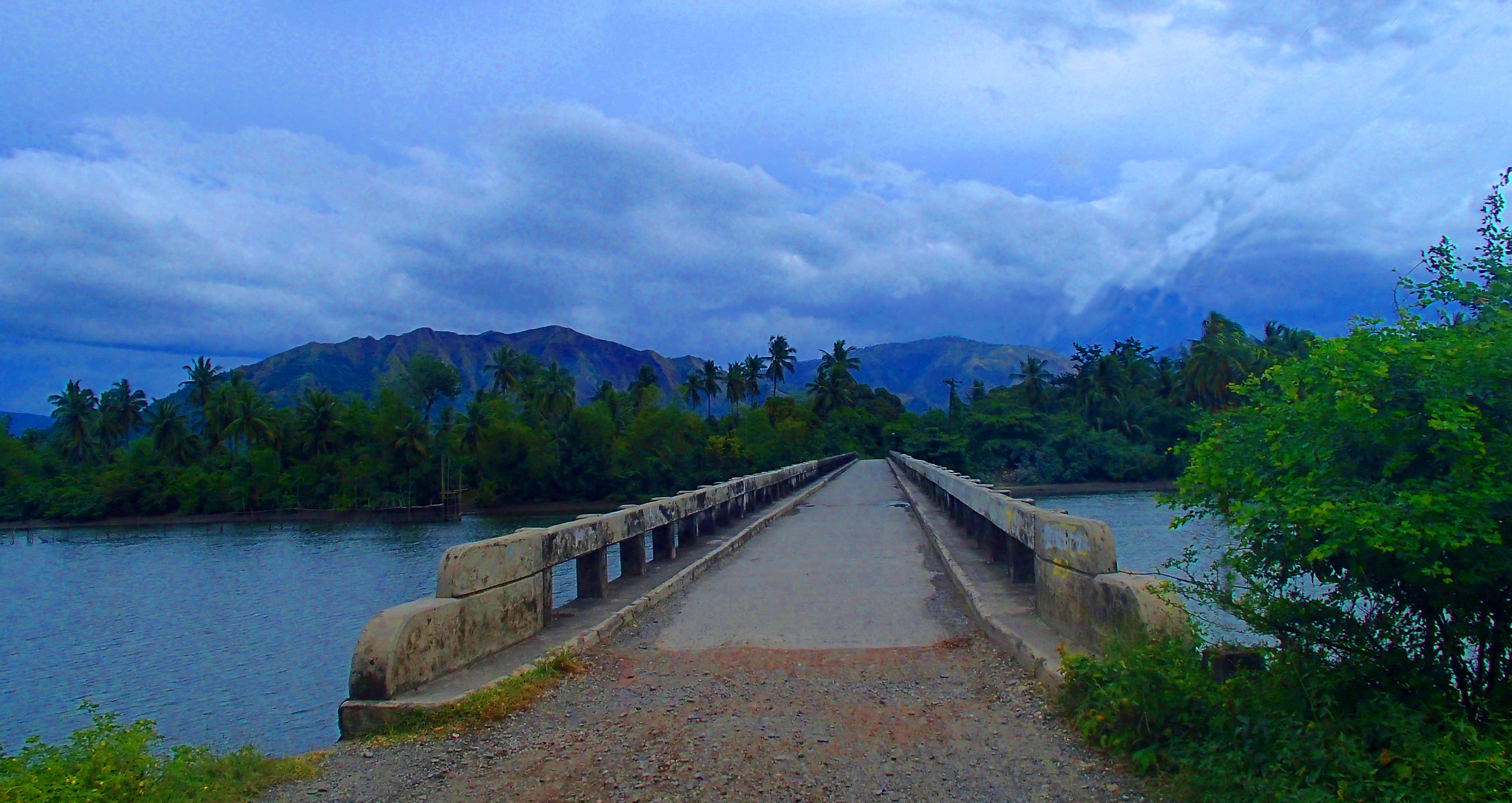
- Bridge in Sta. Cruz

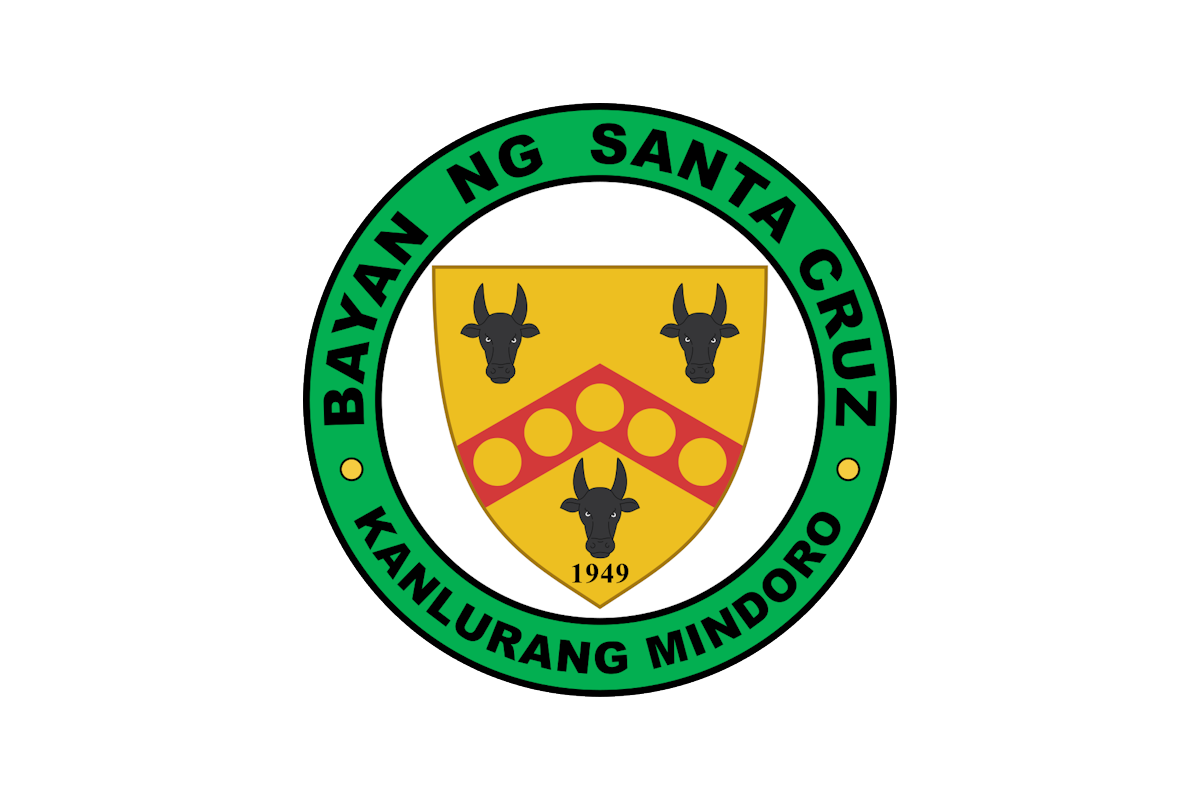
- Flag Seal

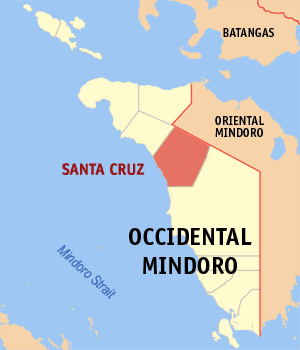
- Map of Occidental Mindoro with Santa Cruz highlighted
- Interactive map of Santa Cruz
- Location within the Philippines
- Coordinates: 13°04′59″N 120°43′09″E
- Country: Philippines
- Region: Mimaropa
- Province: Occidental Mindoro
- District: Lone district
- Founded: April 1, 1949
- Barangays: 11 (see Barangays)

Government
  - Type: Sangguniang Bayan
  - Mayor: Ernie Torreliza
  - Vice Mayor: Mark Galsim
  - Representative: Odie F. Tarriela
  - Electorate: 25,180 voters (2025)

Area
  - Total: 681.40 km^{2} (263.09 sq mi)
- Elevation: 9.0 m (29.5 ft)
- Highest elevation: 158 m (518 ft)
- Lowest elevation: 0 m (0 ft)

Population (2024 census)
  - Total: 40,010
  - Density: 58.72/km^{2} (152.1/sq mi)
  - Households: 10,592

Economy
  - Income class: 1st municipal income class
  - Poverty incidence: 29.33% (2023)
  - Revenue: ₱ 385.7 million (2024)
  - Assets: ₱ 759.5 million (2024)
  - Expenditure: ₱ 332 million (2024)
  - Liabilities: ₱ 249 million (2024)

Service provider
  - Electricity: Occidental Mindoro Electric Cooperative (OMECO)
- Time zone: UTC+8 (PST)
- ZIP code: 5105
- PSGC: 1705111000
- IDD : area code: +63 (0)43
- Native languages: Alangan; Iraya; Tagalog

Santa Cruz, officially the Municipality of Santa Cruz (Tagalog: Bayan ng Santa Cruz), is a municipality in the province of Occidental Mindoro, Philippines. According to the 2024 census, it has a population of 40,010 people.

It was formerly known as Talabasi during the precolonial era. It is 25 kilometres (16 mi) from Mamburao.

== History ==
Santa Cruz was created as a pueblo during the Spanish regime. During the American regime, it became a part of Mamburao as a barrio, along with Paluan and Abra de Ilog.

On April 1, 1949, Santa Cruz was created as a municipality once again, by virtue of Executive Order 210, signed by president Elpidio Quirino.

== Geography ==
=== Barangays ===
Santa Cruz is politically subdivided into 11 barangays. Each barangay consists of puroks and some have sitios.

- Alacaak
- Barahan
- Casague
- Dayap
- Kurtinganan
- Lumangbayan
- Mulawin
- Pinagturilan (San Pedro)
- Poblacion I (Barangay 1)
- Poblacion II (Barangay 2)
- San Vicente

=== Climate ===
Climate data for Santa Cruz, Occidental Mindoro
Month	Jan	Feb	Mar	Apr	May	Jun	Jul	Aug	Sep	Oct	Nov	Dec	Year
Mean daily maximum °C (°F)	29 (84)	30 (86)	31 (88)	32 (90)	31 (88)	30 (86)	29 (84)	29 (84)	29 (84)	29 (84)	29 (84)	29 (84)	30 (86)
Mean daily minimum °C (°F)	21 (70)	21 (70)	22 (72)	23 (73)	25 (77)	26 (79)	25 (77)	25 (77)	25 (77)	24 (75)	23 (73)	22 (72)	24 (74)
Average precipitation mm (inches)	42 (1.7)	31 (1.2)	49 (1.9)	71 (2.8)	249 (9.8)	368 (14.5)	426 (16.8)	350 (13.8)	381 (15.0)	292 (11.5)	144 (5.7)	80 (3.1)	2,483 (97.8)
Average rainy days	10.2	8.3	11.7	15.9	25.2	27.5	28.9	27.0	27.5	26.0	18.2	13.0	239.4
Source: Meteoblue

== Demographics ==
Population census of Santa Cruz
Year	Pop.	±% p.a.
1960	2,907	—
1970	6,281	+8.00%
1975	10,166	+10.14%
1980	10,903	+1.41%
1990	16,675	+4.34%
1995	21,911	+5.25%
2000	26,887	+4.48%
2007	30,402	+1.71%
2010	34,544	+4.76%
2015	37,484	+1.57%
2020	42,417	+2.64%
2024	40,010	−1.39%
Source: Philippine Statistics Authority

== Economy ==
Poverty incidence of Santa Cruz (%)

Source: Philippine Statistics Authority

== Government ==
=== Elected officials ===
Municipal council (2013 – 2016):

- Mayor: Ernesto P. Torreliza
- Vice Mayor: Mark Galsim
- Sangguniang Bayan:
  - TRIA, ANNIE
  - RODRIGUEZ, EDDIE
  - VENTURERO, ALLAN
  - AQUINO, ALEX
  - DE LARA, SUZIE
  - PAGUAGAN, VINANG
  - GONZALES, DARWIN
  - FERNANDEZ, ALICE
- SB Secretary: Euzaida G. Viray

=== List of former chief executives ===
- Santiago Vidal (1952–1955)
- Teodoro Malabanan (1956–1959)
- Marta A. Viaña (1960–1963)
- Florante A. Tria (1964–1967, 1972–1986)
- Nestor Abeleda (1968–1971)
- Jesus T. Abeleda (1986)
- Manuel Miclat (1986–1987)
- Marceliano Morales (1987–1988)
- Purificacion T. Abeleda (1988–1992)
- Artemio S. Abeleda (1992–2001)
- Filemon M. Galsim (2001–2004, 2007–)
- Leonardo R. Abeleda (2004–2007)

P

== Education ==
The Santa Cruz Schools District Office governs all educational institutions within the municipality. It oversees the management and operations of all private and public, from primary to secondary schools.

=== Primary and elementary schools ===
- Alacaak Elementary School
- Baclaran Elementary School
- Bagong Sikat Elementary School
- Barahan Elementary School
- Kabanabahan Minority School
- Calomintao Settlement & Farm School
- Casague Elementary School
- Cuarenta Elementary School
- DAYAP Elementary School
- Eleuterio Soriano School
- Hosea Christian Mission School
- Kabangkalan Elementary School
- Ke-uring Elementary School
- Kurtinganan Elementary School
- M. Rodriguez Memorial Elementary School
- Mendiola Elementary School
- Mulawin Elementary School
- Pinagturilan Elementary School
- Pola Elementary School
- San Vicente Elementary School
- Sanog-lakol Minority School
- Siapo Elementary School
- Sta. Cruz Central School
- Tilago Minority School
- Ulanguan Minority School

=== Secondary schools ===
- Barahan National High School
- Barahan National High School (Sinagtala Annex)
- Pinagturilan National High School
- Santa Cruz National High School
