= Mamburao =

Capital of Occidental Mindoro, Philippines

- Municipality
- Municipality of Mamburao
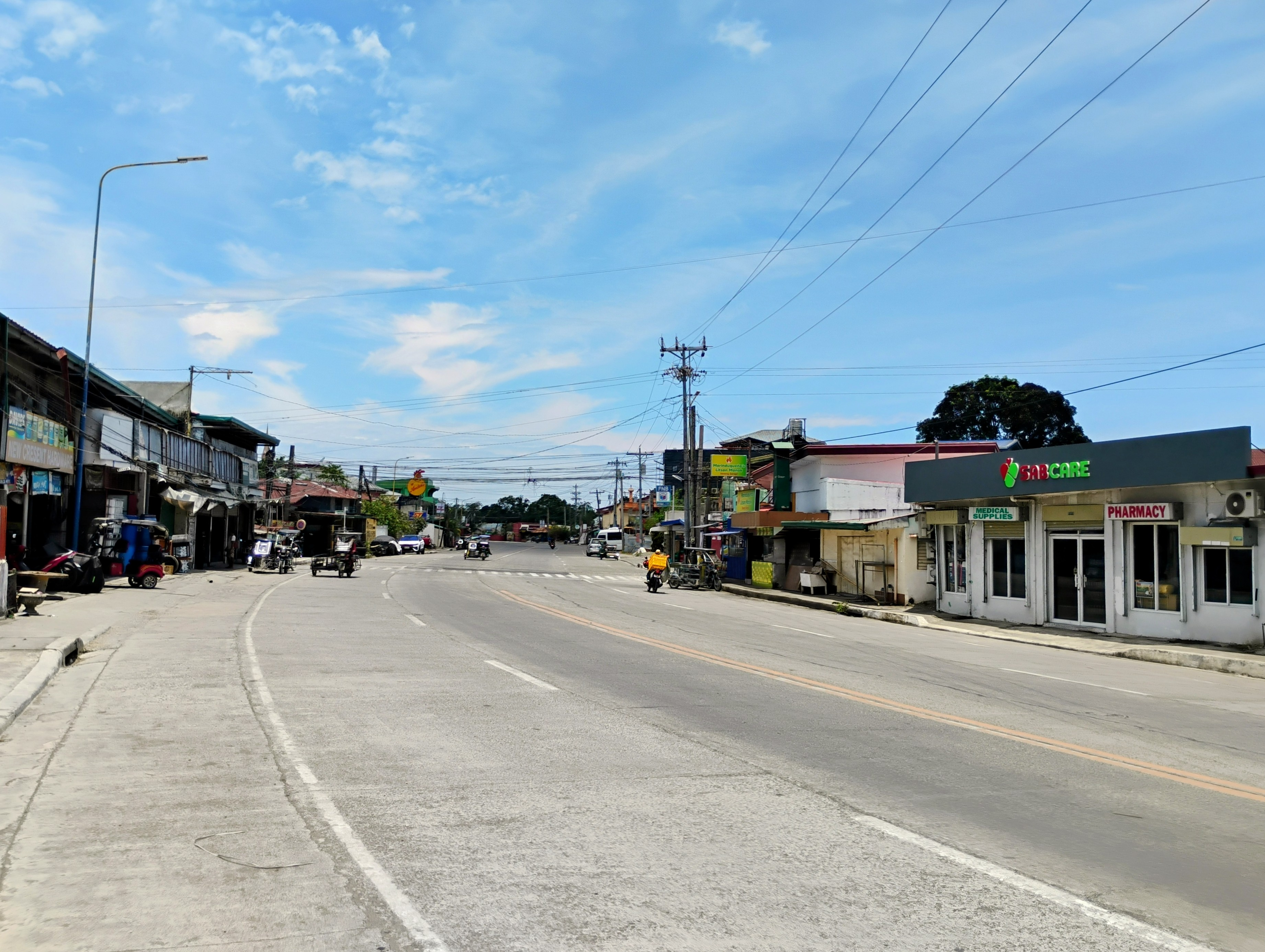
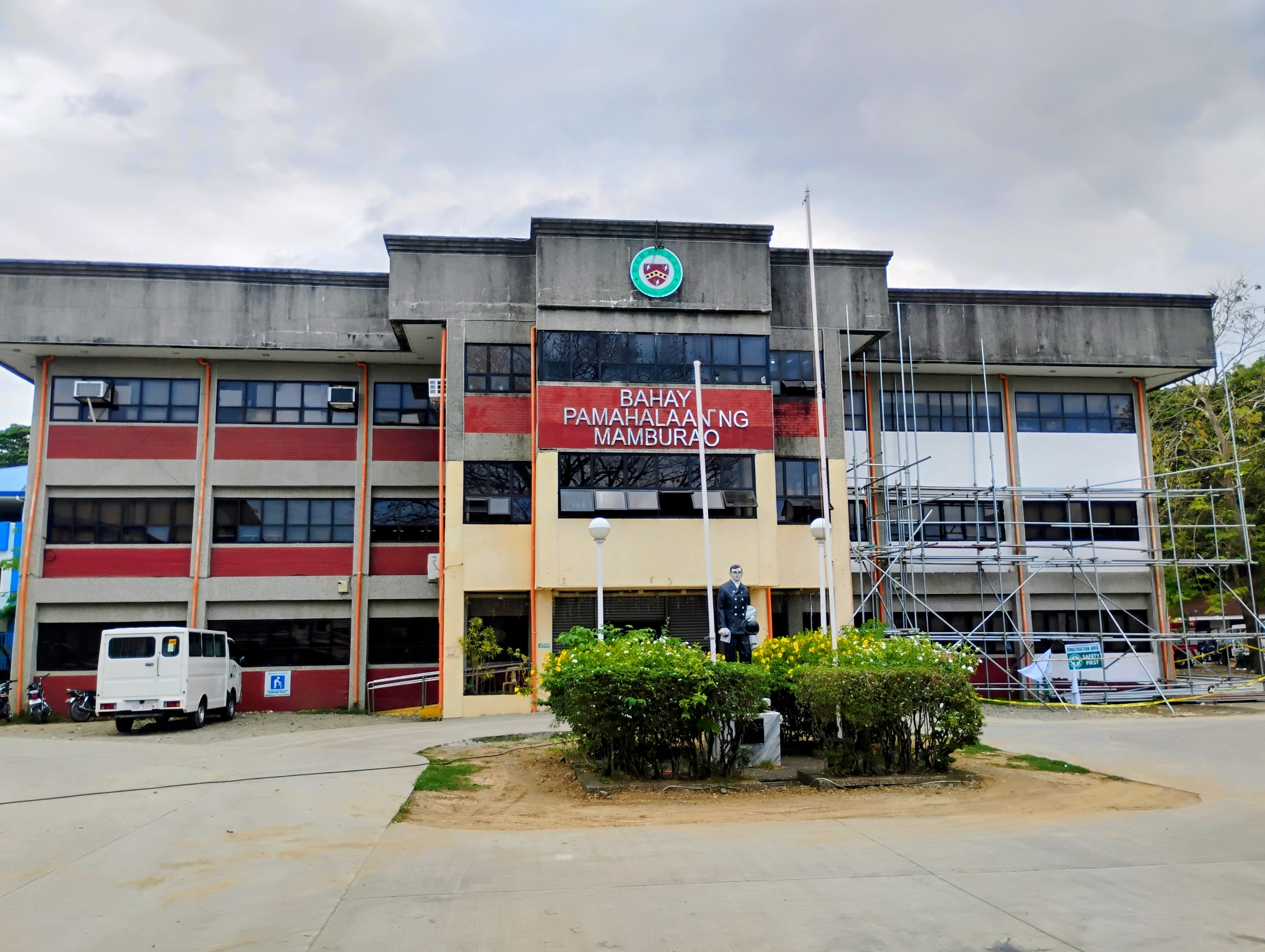
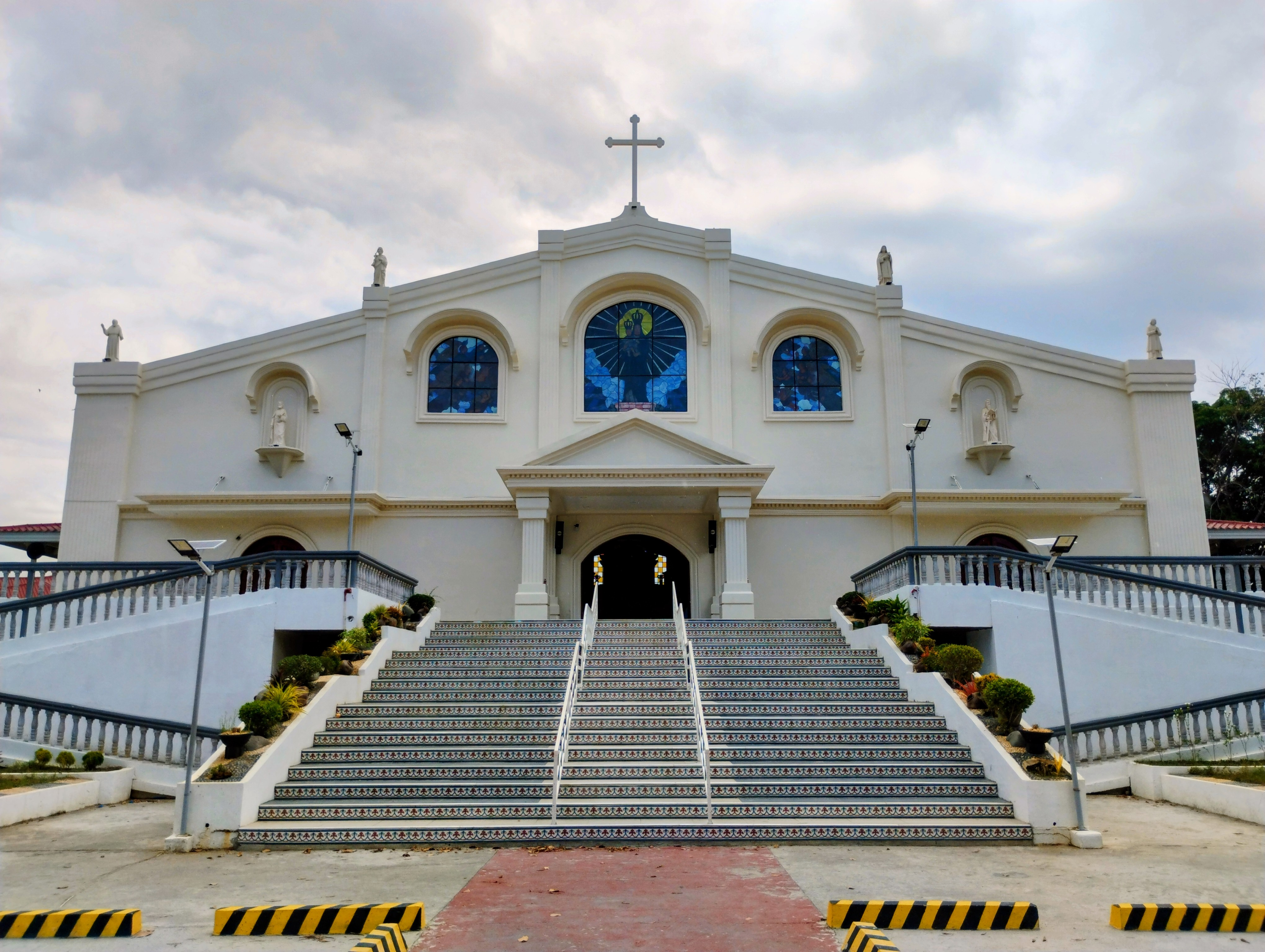
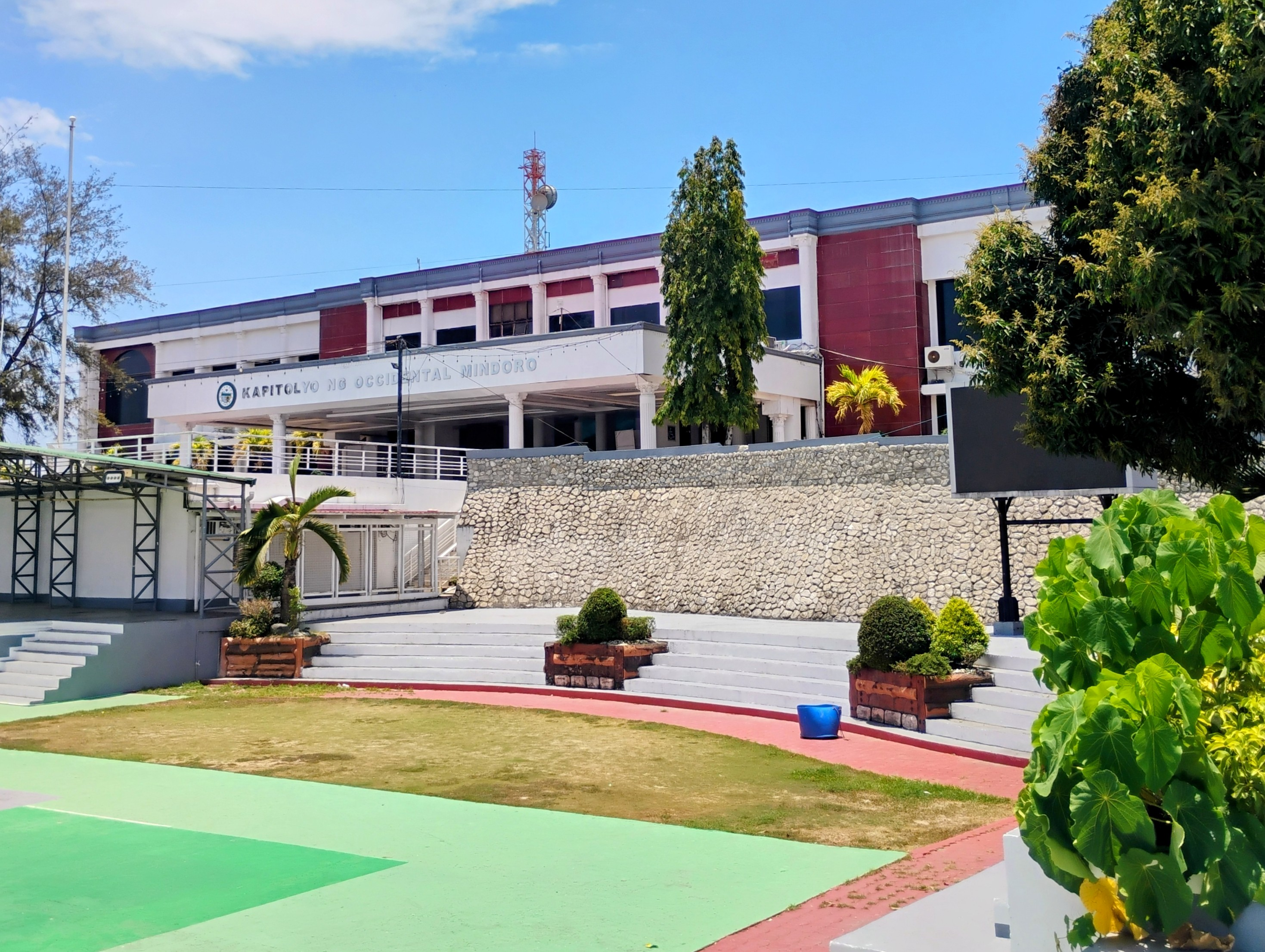
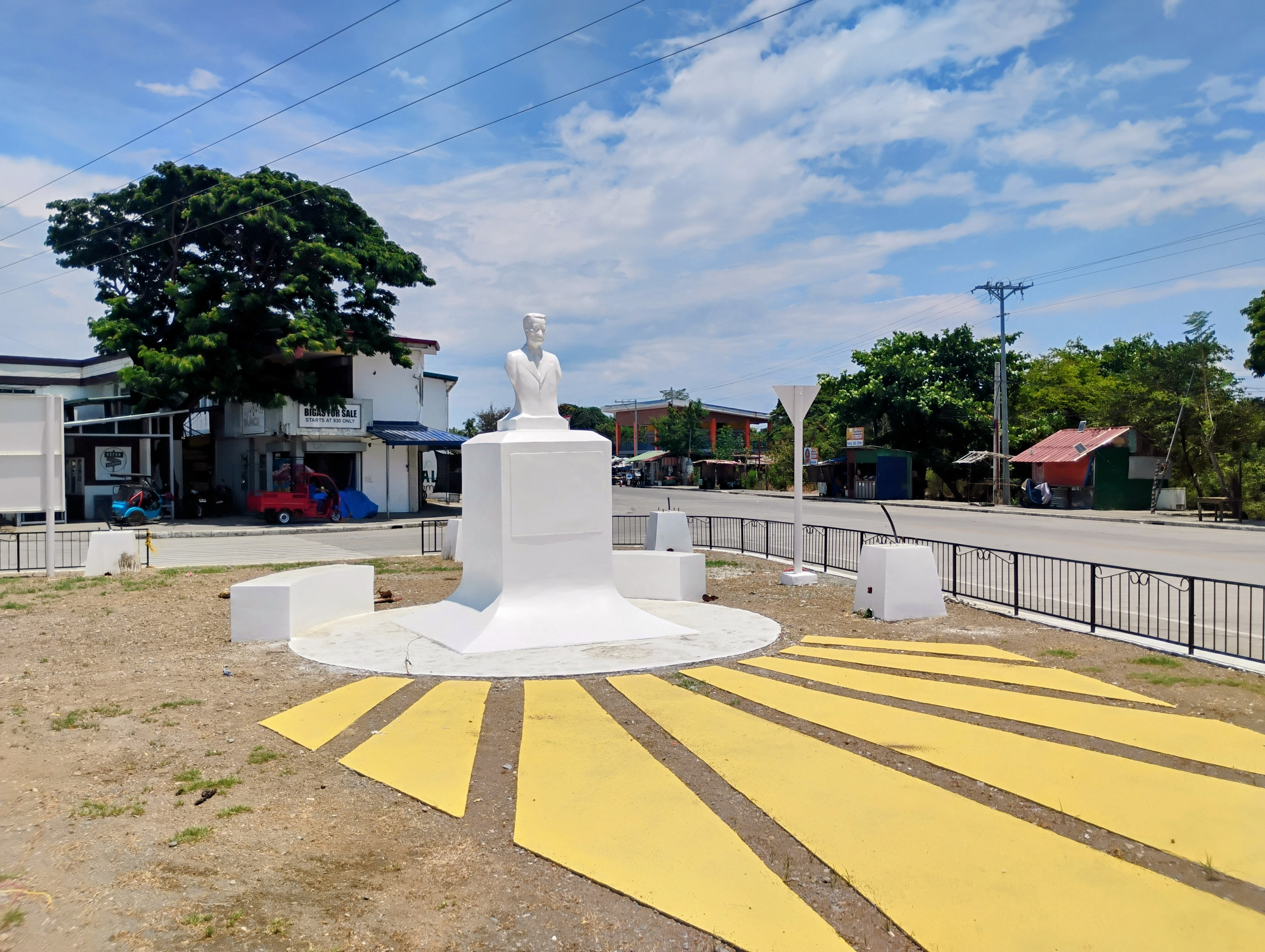
- National Road in Mamburao Mamburao Municipal Hall Nuestra Señora del Pilar Shrine and Parish Occidental Mindoro Provincial Capitol Complex Liboro Park

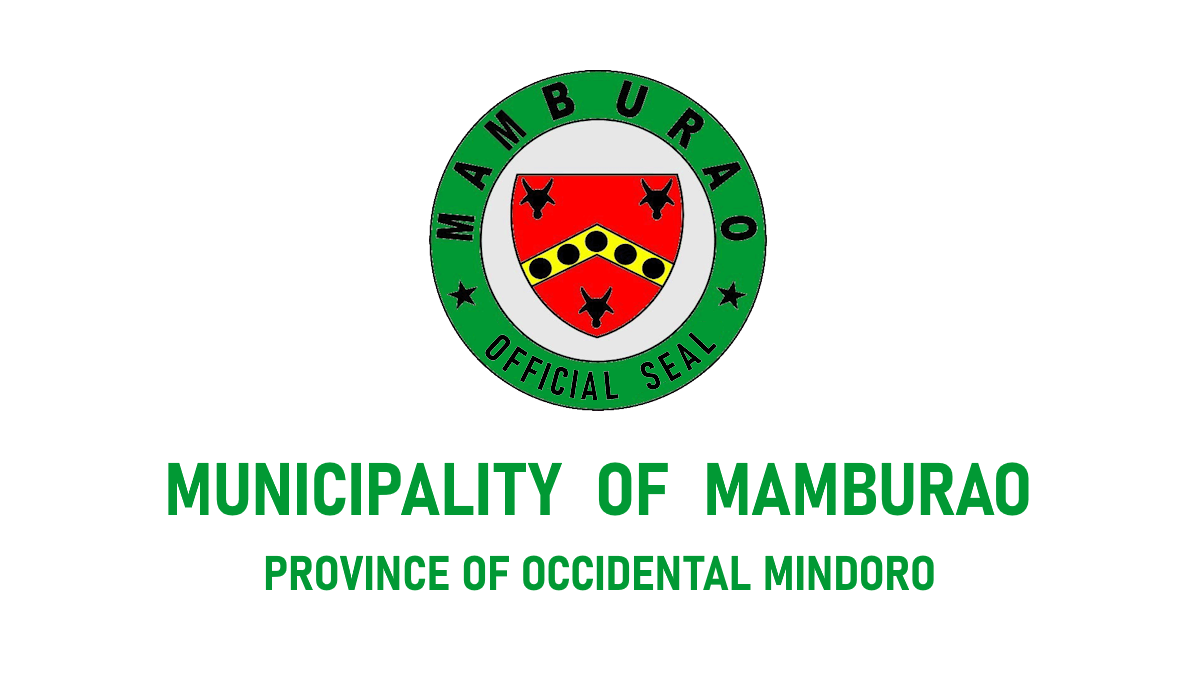
- Flag Seal

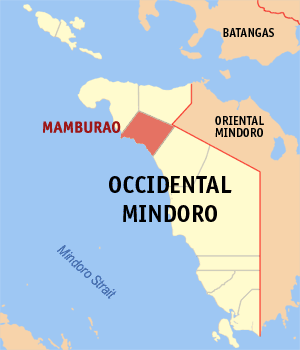
- Map of Occidental Mindoro with Mamburao highlighted
- Interactive map of Mamburao
- Location within the Philippines
- Coordinates: 13°13′24″N 120°35′46″E
- Country: Philippines
- Region: Mimaropa
- Province: Occidental Mindoro
- District: Lone district
- Barangays: 15 (see Barangays)

Government
  - Type: Sangguniang Bayan
  - Mayor: Glicerio "E-K" S. Almero, III
  - Vice Mayor: Raul "Boy" V. Masangkay
  - Representative: Leody “Odie” F. Tarriela
  - Electorate: 31,011 voters (2025)

Area
  - Total: 283.51 km^{2} (109.46 sq mi)
- Elevation: 8.8 m (29 ft)
- Highest elevation: 1,765 m (5,791 ft)
- Lowest elevation: 0 m (0 ft)

Population (2024 census)
  - Total: 44,554
  - Density: 157.15/km^{2} (407.02/sq mi)
  - Households: 11,476

Economy
  - Income class: 1st municipal income class
  - Poverty incidence: 16.89% (2023)
  - Revenue: ₱ 295.8 million (2024)
  - Assets: ₱ 604.4 million (2024)
  - Expenditure: ₱ 284.7 million (2024)
  - Liabilities: ₱ 294.5 million (2024)

Service provider
  - Electricity: Occidental Mindoro Electric Cooperative (OMECO)
- Time zone: UTC+8 (PST)
- ZIP code: 5106
- PSGC: 1705106000
- IDD : area code: +63 (0)43
- Native languages: Iraya; Tagalog
- Website: mamburao.gov.ph

Mamburao (pronounced [mɐm'bʊraw]), officially the Municipality of Mamburao (Tagalog: Bayan ng Mamburao), is a municipality and capital of the province of Occidental Mindoro, Philippines. According to the 2024 census, it has a population of 44,554 people.

== History ==
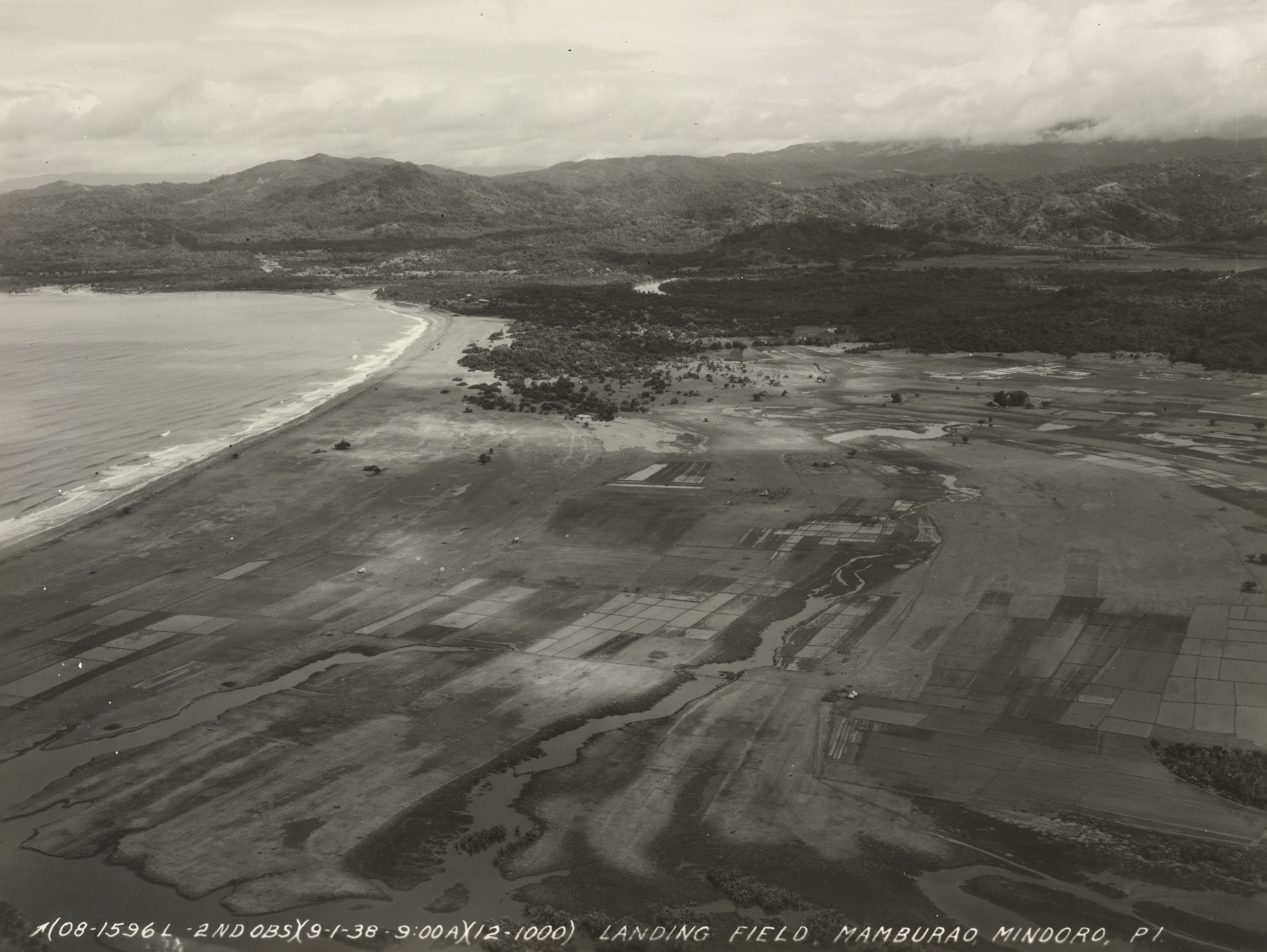
Mamburao Poblacion area in 1938

Mamburao was originally settled by the Moro people and was one of their strongholds in the island of Mindoro. The settlement was the first one in Mindoro to be plundered by the Spaniards. Hearing that it was a rich town, the Spanish and their Pintado allies attacked and captured the population. The wealthy among their captives were then allowed to ransom themselves free. With their superior weapons and knowledge of war strategies used in their just concluded Reconquista, they utilised this method all around the islands, and by this the Spanish earned their gold.

On January 1, 1570, wanting more, Miguel López de Legazpi sent a fleet of 15 boats from Panay, led by his grandson Juan de Salcedo, to conquer the Moro town. Another expedition was sent to Mamburao, led by Salcedo and Martin de Goiti, with the intent of establishing Spanish presence in Mindoro.

Catholicism was propagated in Mamburao and the town was placed under the third convent district based in Cavite. Mamburao was subjected to attack by the Mindanao Moro, guided by its former Mamburao inhabitants who wanted to claim their lands and have a prosperous life there between the 17th and 18th centuries. Mamburao, supported by its population, was even made into a sea haven by the Moros, who used it as base of their sea attacks against Friar induced settlements on coastal towns in Mindoro, Luzon and Visayas.

In the late 19th century, encouraged by Spanish authorities promising them rich lands to till, with weapons but in exchange for working as its ready foot soldiers on quick notice, Mamburao then saw an influx of Ilocano and Tagalog immigrants.

Near the end of the Spanish colonial period in the Philippines, the settlement of Sablayan was incorporated to Mamburao as a barrio. In 1905, Paluan and Abra de Ilog were likewise incorporated under Act 1280. Abra de Ilog, Paluan and Sablayan were later carved out from Mamburao as separate municipalities. Another barrio of Mamburao, Santa Cruz, was also made into a separate municipality, in 1949.

Mamburao was designated as the capital of Occidental Mindoro when the island province of Mindoro was divided into two separate provinces on June 13, 1950: Oriental and Occidental Mindoro. San Jose was the temporary capital until January 1, 1951.

== Geography ==
=== Barangays ===
Mamburao is politically subdivided into 15 barangays. Each barangay consists of puroks and some have sitios.

There are 8 barangays which are found in the poblacion created under P.D. 86 and the rest are outside of that area.

- Balansay
- Fatima (Tii)
- Payompon
- Poblacion 1
- Poblacion 2
- Poblacion 3
- Poblacion 4
- Poblacion 5
- Poblacion 6
- Poblacion 7
- Poblacion 8
- San Luis (Ligang)
- Talabaan
- Tangkalan
- Tayamaan

=== Climate ===
Climate data for Mamburao, Occidental Mindoro
Month	Jan	Feb	Mar	Apr	May	Jun	Jul	Aug	Sep	Oct	Nov	Dec	Year
Mean daily maximum °C (°F)	28 (82)	29 (84)	30 (86)	31 (88)	31 (88)	30 (86)	29 (84)	29 (84)	29 (84)	29 (84)	29 (84)	28 (82)	29 (85)
Mean daily minimum °C (°F)	22 (72)	21 (70)	22 (72)	23 (73)	25 (77)	25 (77)	25 (77)	25 (77)	25 (77)	24 (75)	23 (73)	22 (72)	24 (74)
Average precipitation mm (inches)	48 (1.9)	32 (1.3)	41 (1.6)	54 (2.1)	257 (10.1)	410 (16.1)	466 (18.3)	422 (16.6)	429 (16.9)	300 (11.8)	137 (5.4)	92 (3.6)	2,688 (105.7)
Average rainy days	10.8	8.0	9.8	11.7	23.1	27.5	29.2	28.7	28.7	25.5	18.2	12.8	234
Source: Meteoblue

== Demographics ==
Population census of Mamburao
Year	Pop.	±% p.a.
1903	1,927	—
1918	2,595	+2.00%
1939	4,423	+2.57%
1948	5,571	+2.60%
1960	5,822	+0.37%
1970	10,559	+6.13%
1975	12,655	+3.70%
1980	15,533	+4.18%
1990	21,781	+3.44%
1995	25,627	+3.09%
2000	30,378	+3.71%
2007	34,487	+1.77%
2010	39,237	+4.81%
2015	42,975	+1.75%
2020	47,705	+2.22%
2024	44,554	−1.63%
Source: Philippine Statistics Authority

== Economy ==
Poverty incidence of Mamburao (%)

Source: Philippine Statistics Authority

According to the Bureau of Local Government Finance, the annual regular revenue of Mamburao for the fiscal year of 2016 was ₱132,318,636.29.

The economy of Mamburao is highly dependent on its agricultural produce. The two major crops are rice and corn. Rice production accounts to 25,527.80 MT with 4.484 MT/ha while corn production accounts to 16,273.60 MT or 7 MT/ha. This production has increased in both area and volume in the year 2016 to 2017. Exportation to Region IV-A or CALABARZON is also one of the municipality's roles.

Additionally, agricultural production is also varied with some farmers venturing on cassava, onion, mango, legumes, watermelon, and other products. There are also several livestock and dairy farmers particularly in Barangays Balansay, Tayamaan, and Payompon while there are also poultry farmer in Barangays Fatima, Balansay, Payompon, and Tayamaan.

Fisheries and aquaculture also play a vital role in the economy of the municipality. Among the three sectors of the fishing industry, marine fishery is the most prominent with Barangays Talabaan, Fatima, Balansay, Payompon, Poblacion 2, Poblacion 7, and Tayamaan being engaged in it. Products include yellow fin tuna, squid, roundscad/galunggong, lapu-lapu, Spanish mackerel, dalagang bukid, dilis, talakitok, bisugo, stonefish, prawns, crabs, and lobsters. Among these, yellow fin tuna, squid, and lobsters are exported to Europe, Japan, Hong Kong, and the United Arab Emirates.

In terms of Mamburao's commerce and trade, a concentration of commercial areas is seen in the Poblacion barangays as well as in Barangay Payompon. In 2017, there was a total of 701 establishments with space rental having the highest count. General merchandise stores are also numerous in the municipality. Local revenue has also accounted to more than 1 billion coming from commerce and trade. Industry, on the other hand, account to more than 47 million with several bagoong making establishments, rice mills, ice plants, and others. Some of these establishments also export to neighboring municipalities as well as in CALABARZON.

== Sports ==
A Mega Sports Complex will be built at San Luis in Mamburao which will include an athletics stadium, an indoor arena, and an aquatics center. Site preparation is underway as of July 2026.

== Transportation ==
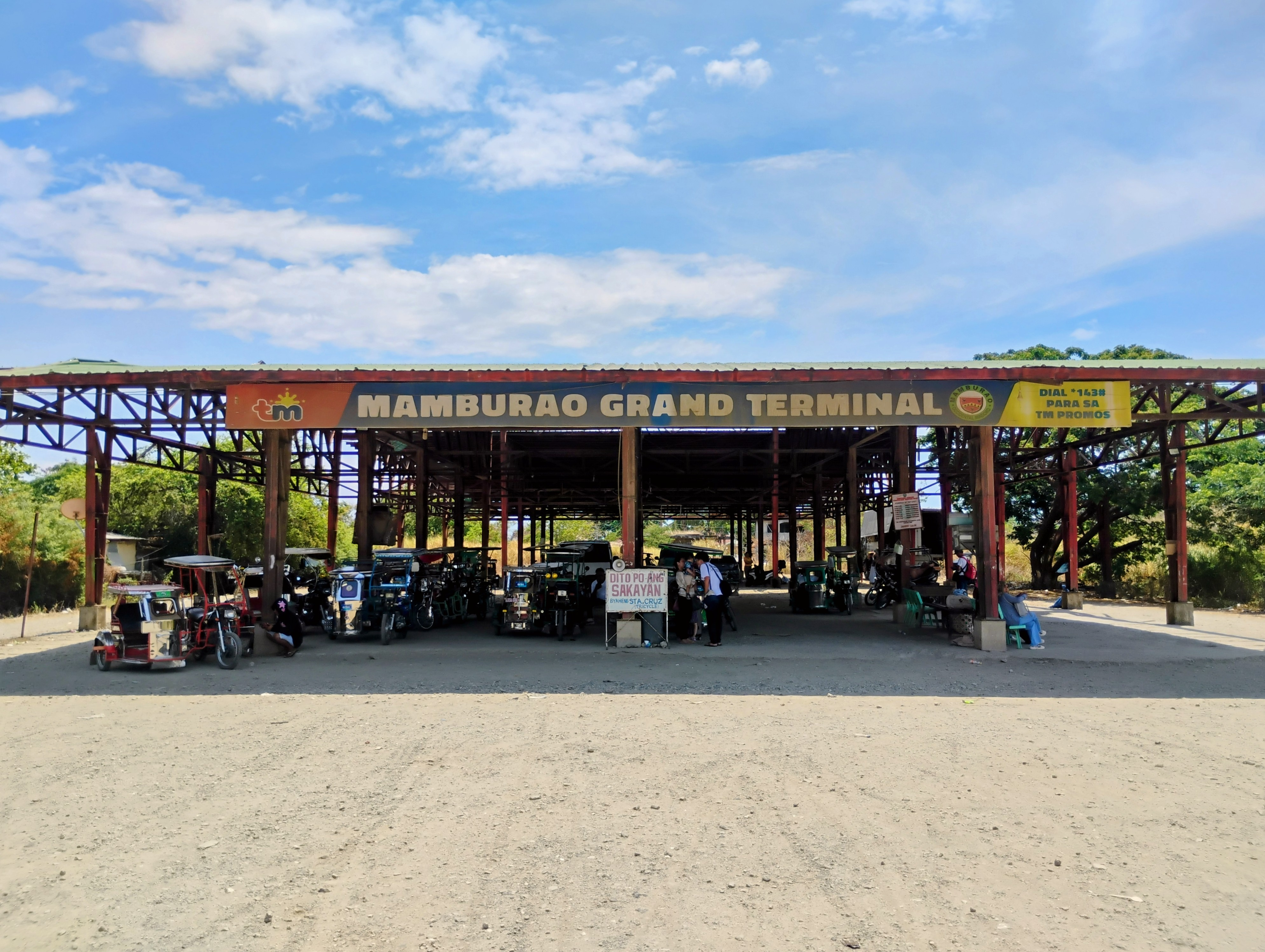
Mamburao Grand Terminal

Tricycles are a common mode of transportation in Mamburao. Vans, jeepneys, and buses are also available and are a means of traveling to other parts of the island of Mindoro such as the port of Abra de Ilog and the southern municipality of San Jose. Mamburao Airport serves chartered flights, although Philippine Airlines used to schedule regular flights at the airport.

== Government ==
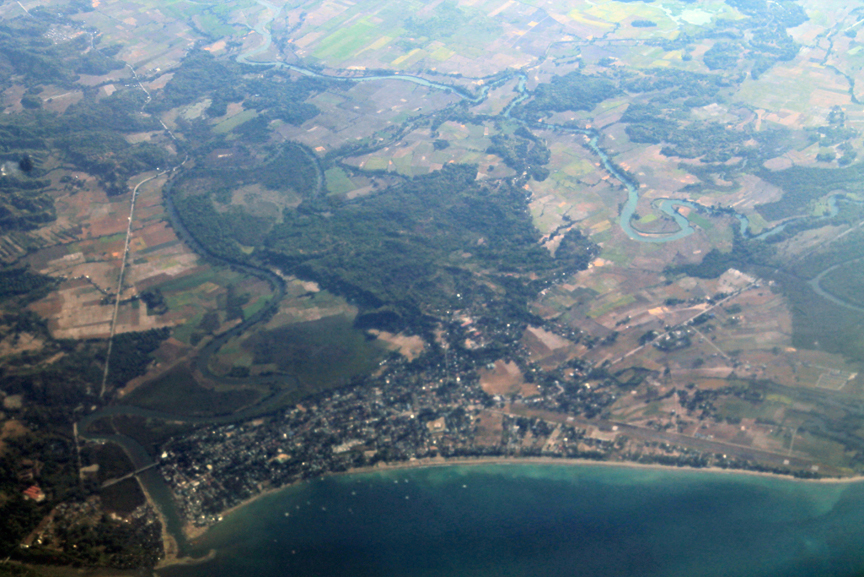
Bird's eye view of Mamburao, Occidental Mindoro

=== Elected officials ===
Municipal council (2025-2028):

- Mayor: Glicerio “E-K” S. Almero III
- Vice Mayor: Raul “Boy” Masangkay
- Sangguniang Bayan:
  - Yanna Abeleda
  - Wyn Esperanza
  - Melquiades B. Ramirez
  - Oliver P. Mataro
  - Eboy Villaflores
  - Ricky Pantoja
  - Les Calabio
  - Brian Bautista

Ex Officio members:

- ABC President: Jun Benasas
- SK Federation President: Vince Alcaide

== Education ==
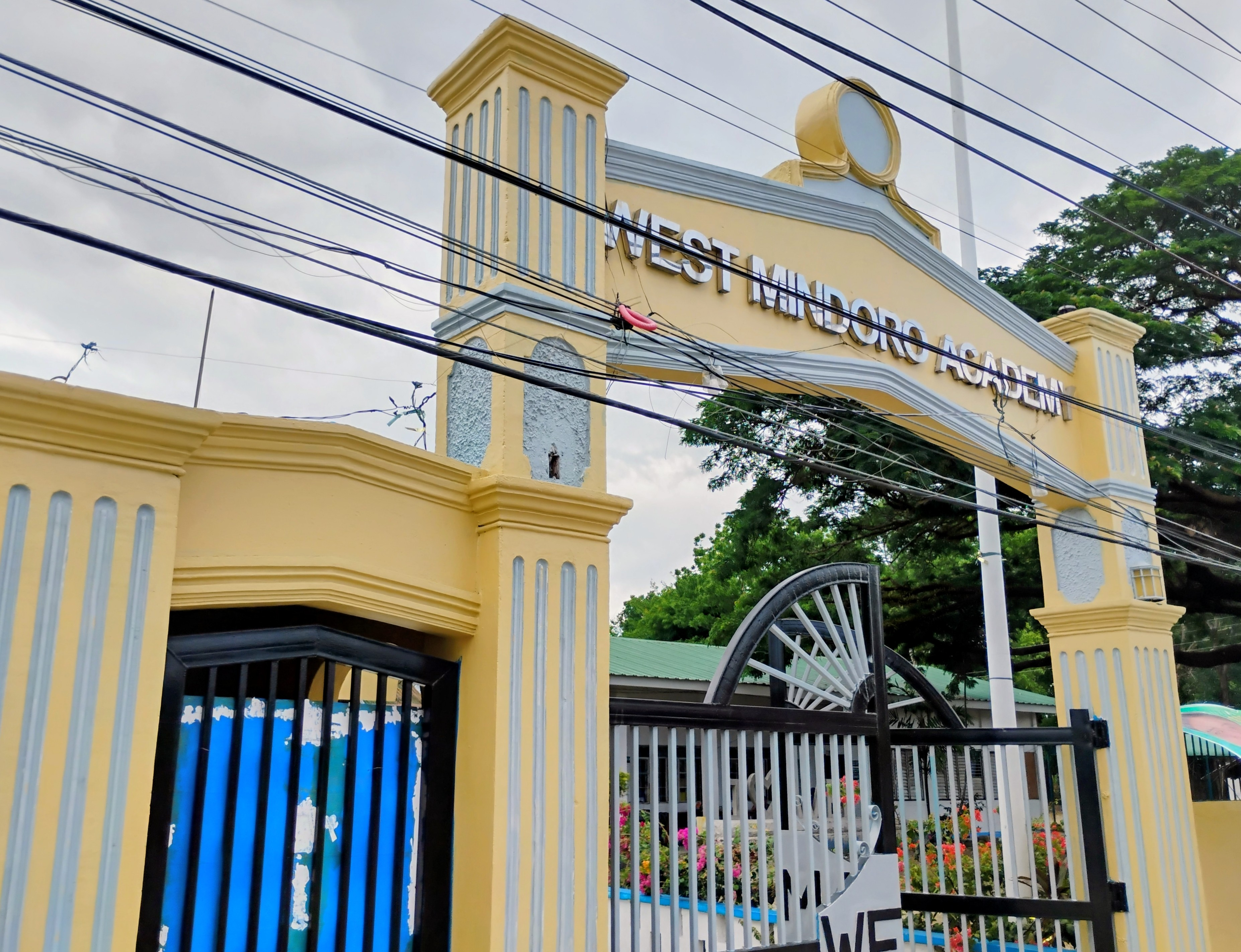
West Mindoro Academy

The Mamburao Schools District Office governs all educational institutions within the municipality. It oversees the management and operations of all private and public, from primary to secondary schools.

=== Secondary schools ===
- Katutubo Excel High School
- Occidental Mindoro National High School
- Puricon Elementary School
- Sulong Ipil Katutubo Excel School
- West Mindoro Academy

=== Higher educational institution ===
- Occidental Mindoro State College-Mamburao Campus
