= Mounts Iglit–Baco Natural Park =

Nature reserve in Mindoro island, Philippines

- IUCN category IV (habitat/species management area)
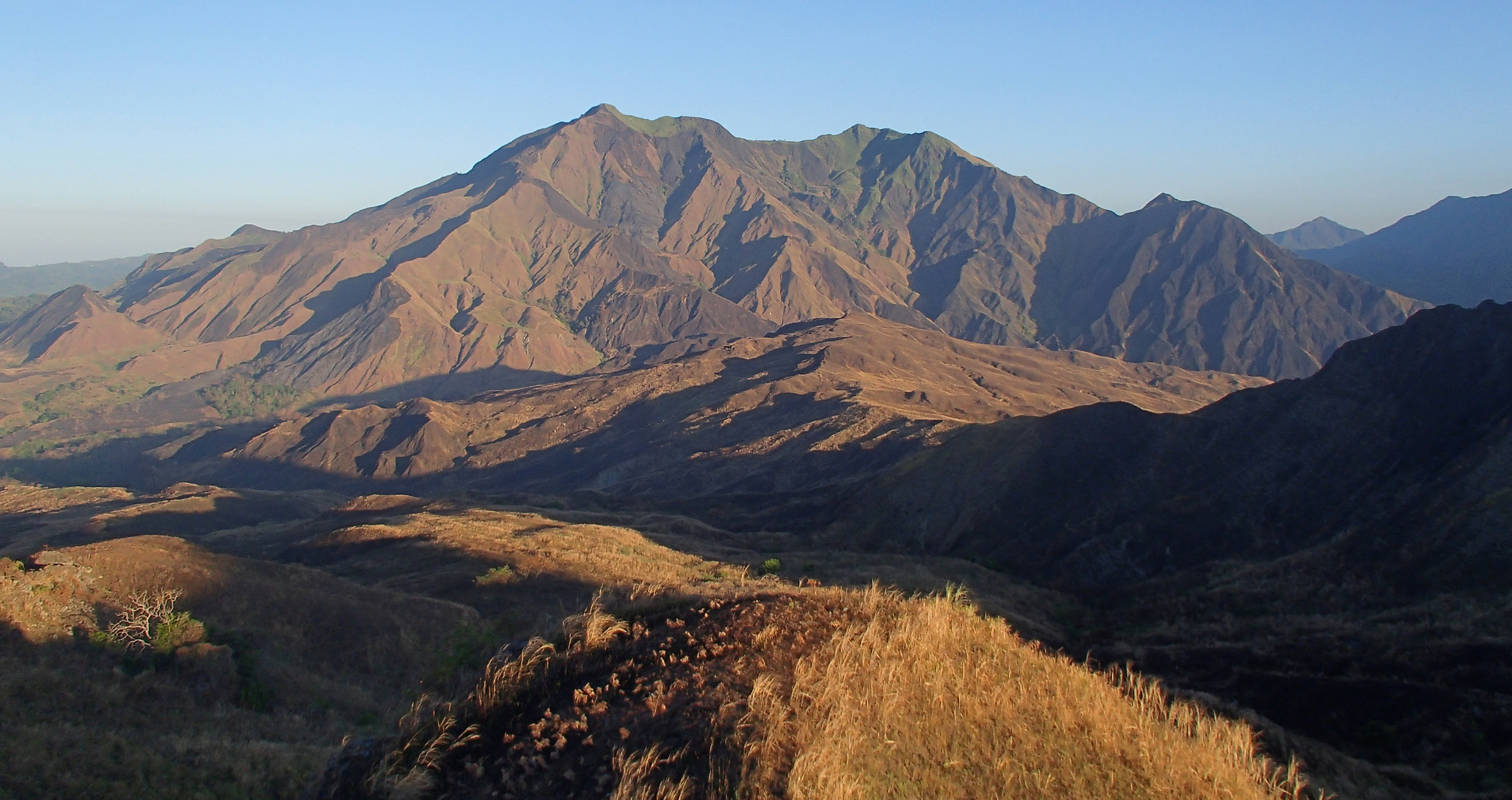
- Mount Iglit in Calintaan

- Location within Luzon Location within Philippines
- Location: Mindoro, Philippines
- Nearest town: Sablayan, Calintaan, Rizal and San Jose, Occidental Mindoro; Bongabong, Bansud, Gloria, and Mansalay, Oriental Mindoro
- Coordinates: 12°54′N 121°13′E
- Area: 106,655.62 hectares (263,551.8 acres)
- Established: November 9, 1970; June 1, 1992; June 22, 2018
- Visitors: 322 (in November 2019 to February 2020)
- Governing body: Department of Environment and Natural Resources

The Mounts Iglit–Baco Natural Park (MIBNP) is a legislated protected area of the Philippines and an ASEAN Heritage Park located in the island of Mindoro in the central Philippines. It was first established in 1970 by virtue of Republic Act No. 6148 as a national park that covered an area of 75,445 hectares (186,430 acres) surrounding Mount Iglit and Mount Baco in the interior of Mindoro. The park is the home of the largest remaining population of the critically endangered tamaraw (a small buffalo). In 2003, the Association of Southeast Asian Nations listed it as one of its four heritage parks in the Philippines. The park has also been nominated to the Tentative List of UNESCO World Heritage Sites in 2006. In 2018, the park was designated as a "Natural Park" under the Republic Act No. 11038 or the Expanded National Integrated Protected Areas Systems (ENIPAS) Act of 2018, which increased the area to 106,656 hectares (263,550 acres).

== Geography ==
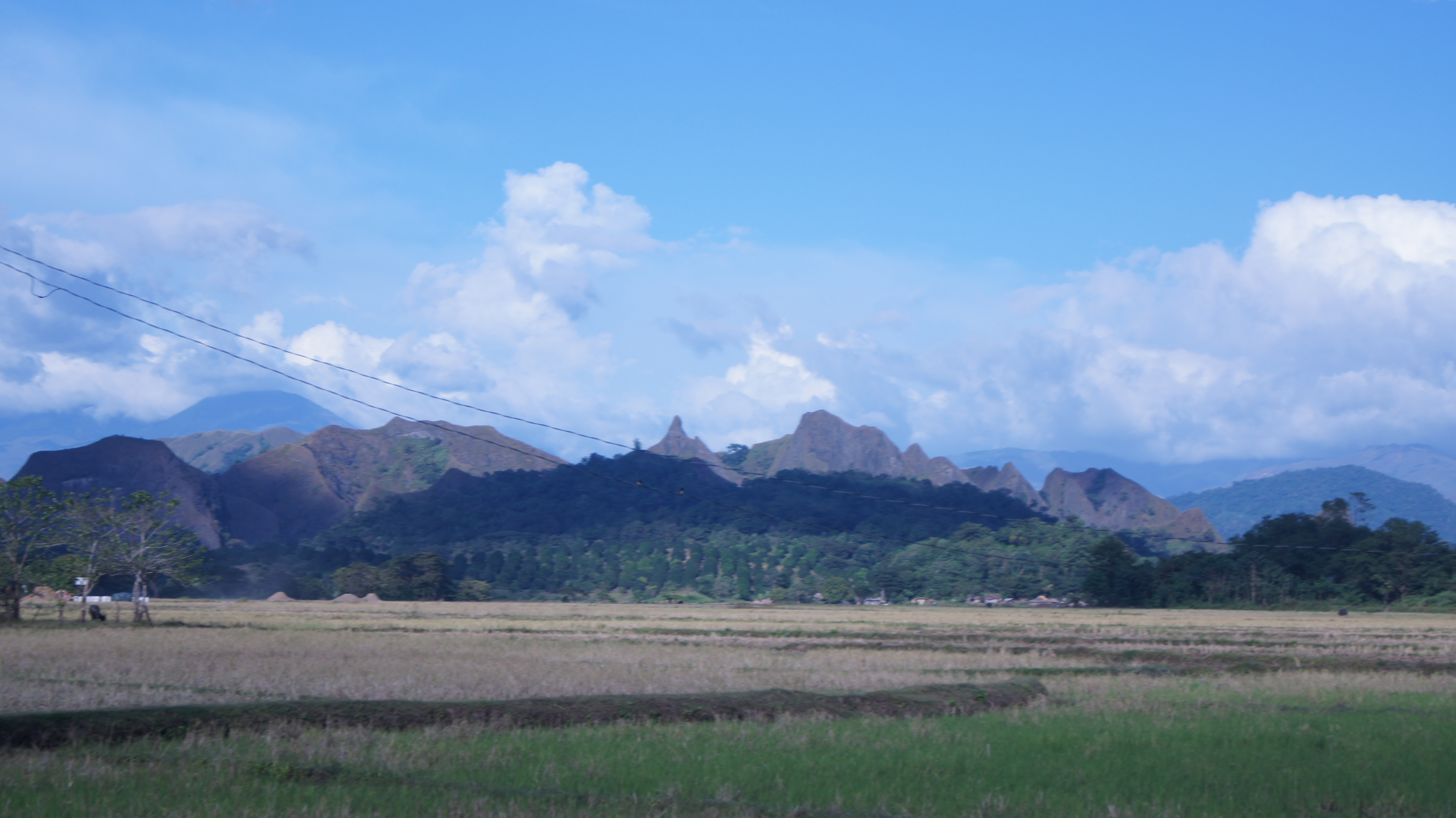
View of the Iglit and Baco mountains from Aguas, Rizal

The natural park lies in the south-central area of Mindoro and is administratively divided across the municipalities of Sablayan, Calintaan, Rizal and San Jose in Occidental Mindoro, and the municipalities of Bongabong, Bansud, Gloria, and Mansalay in Oriental Mindoro.

The municipality of Sablayan occupies the largest portion of the park in terms of area at 68%, and Mansalay occupies the smallest at 1.2%. Most of the protected area facilities are located in the municipality of Calintaan which shares 9% of the total area of MIBNP.

The park has a rugged terrain composed of slopes, river gorges, mountains and plateaus. In the park's northern portion, Mount Baco rises to an elevation of 2,488 metres (8,163 ft) above sea level. Mount Iglit reaches 2,364 metres (7,756 ft) and can be found south of Mount Baco. The park is crossed by ten major river systems, including Mongpong, Patrick, Mag-asawang tubig, Bongabong, Lamintao, Anahawin, and Busuanga Rivers which empty into the Sibuyan Sea and South China Sea.

== Socio-Economic and Cultural Profile ==
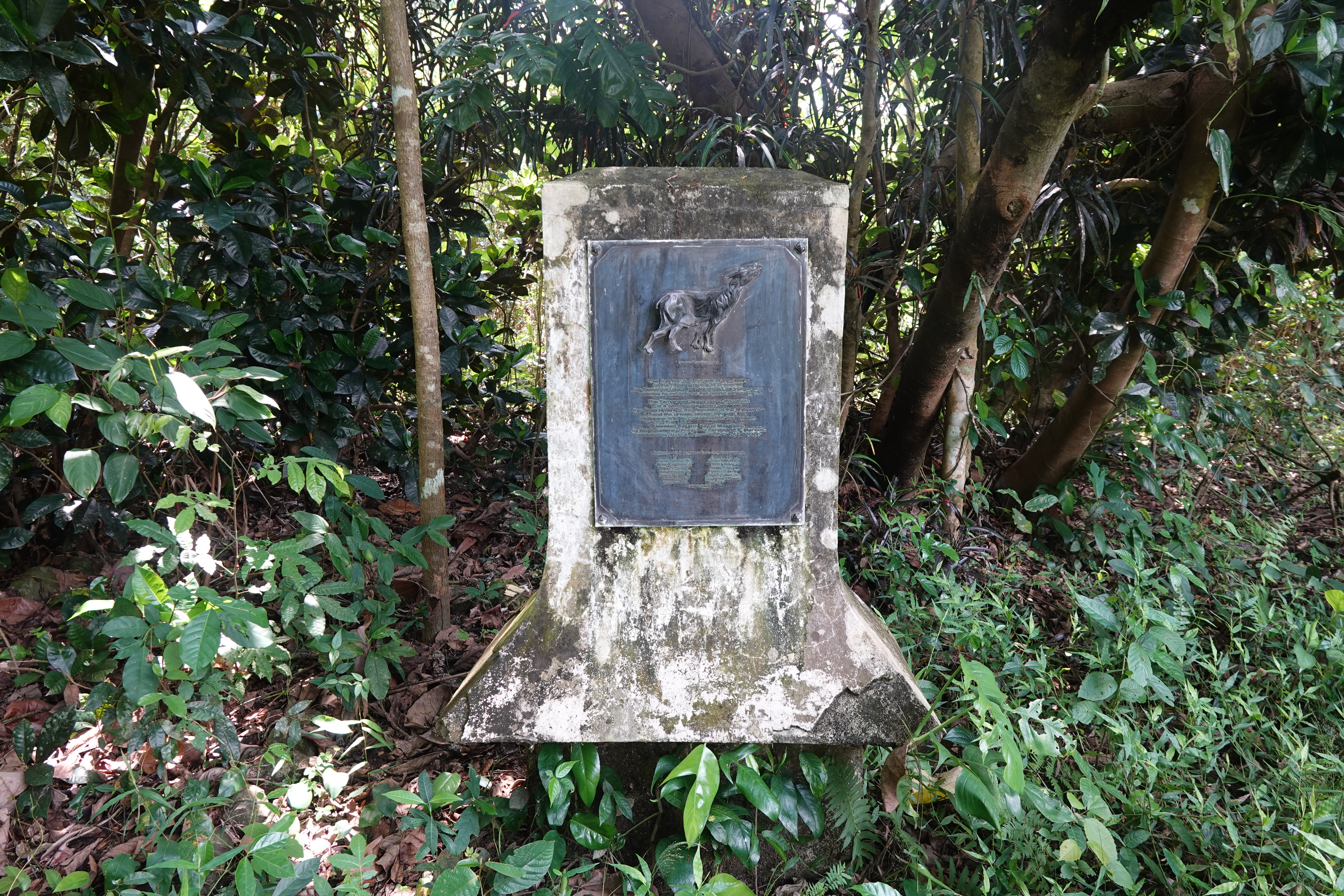
A marker commemorating the establishment of the Tamaraw Conservation Program in 1969 as a result of a cooperative effort between the Philippine Government and the Philippine Wildlife Conservation Foundation.

The park is home to at least six ethnic groups on the island: the Batangas, Tagalog, Mangyan, Bisaya, Bicolano, and Ilocano. At least five (5) Mangyan groups, including 1) Bangon; 2) Buhid; 3) Hanunuo; 4) Tadyawan; and 5) TaoBuid, each with its own language, culture, and tradition. Moreover, the protected area shares boundaries with parts of the ancestral domains of the Taobuid, Buhid, and Bangon, with their unique and entwined cultures within MIBNP. These communities have nurtured a deep connection with the land for generations, their traditions and way of life entwined with the natural rhythms of the park.The Mangyans depend on the park for their subsistence, where they engage in traditional farming and hunting for food. There are also areas of grasslands turned into pastures, as well as areas of slash-and-burn "kaingin" agriculture.

== Biological Features ==
The park's vegetation consists primarily of grasslands, lowland Dipterocarp forests, and montane rainforests on the higher slopes. In the park's southern portion near the Lamintao River is a 367-hectare (910-acre) block of Acacia forest. There is also an area of Agoho forest along the Anahawin River within the Mindoro Biodiversity Rescue and Conservation Center (MBRCC), formerly known as Tamaraw Gene Pool Farm, the birthplace of the Kalikasan Bagong Sibol also known as "Kali", the only tamaraw bred in captivity that survived to maturity. The rest of the lowland portions are open grasslands. The most extensive forests in the national park are in the remote northern portion in the area of Mount Baco.

The park's lush environs harbor an incredible array of wildlife. Aside from the Tamaraw, the park shelters numerous other endangered species. The protected area supports twenty-five (25) known Mindoro's endemic species and their habitats including seven (7) species of birds; nine (9) species of mammals; three (3) species of amphibians; five (5) species of invertebrates; and one (1) species of plants.

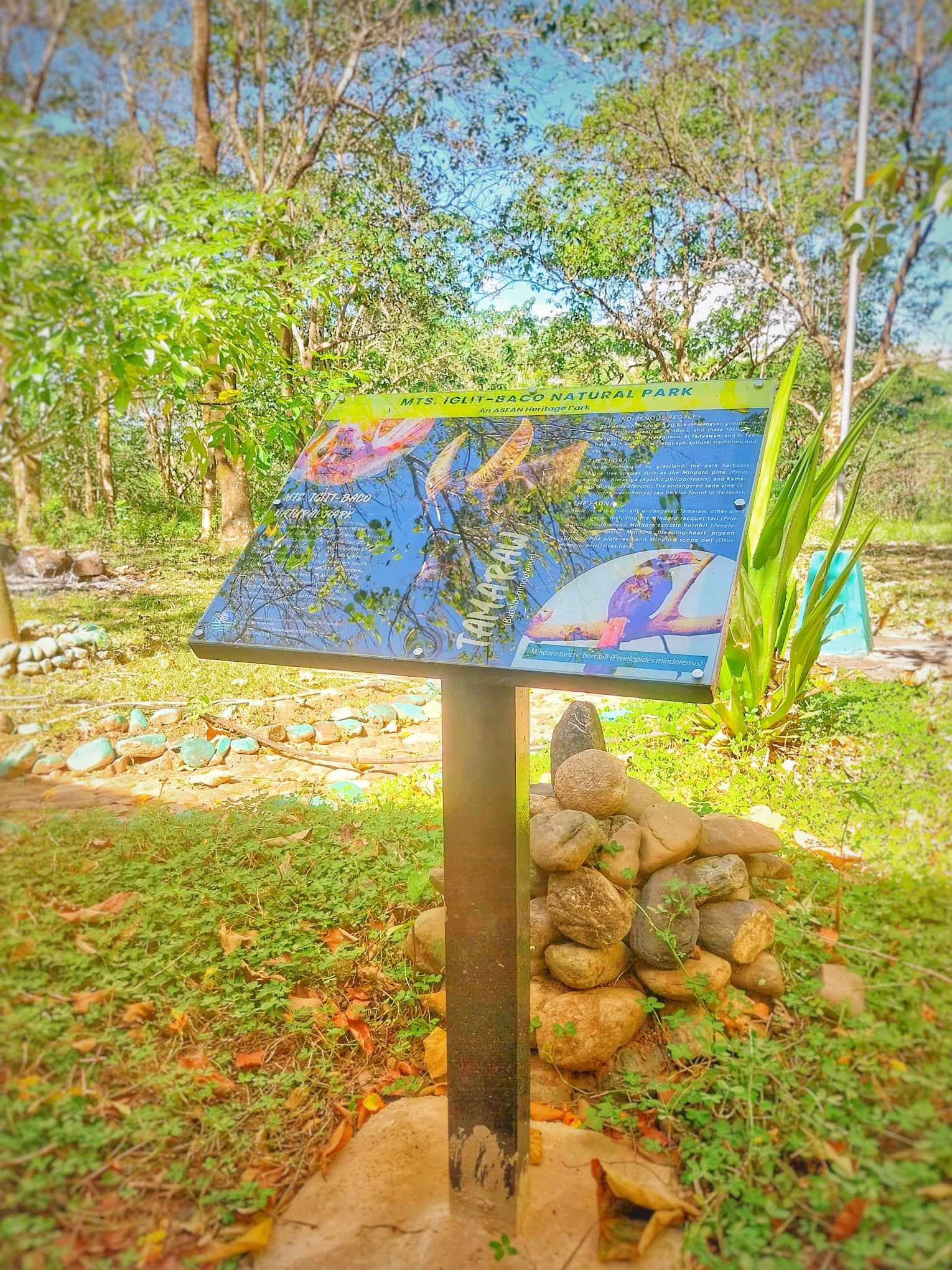
Species interpretive sign installed within Mounts Iglit-Baco Natural Park

MIBNP is one of the 228 Key Biodiversity Areas (KBAs) in the Philippines (i.e., KBA–60) with a total area of 56,299.59 hectares or about 53% of the total area of MIBNP. In relation to KBAs, the MIBNP hosts four Important Bird Areas (IBAs) including PH041: Iglit, PH042: Siburan, PH043: Malpalon, and PH044: Mt. Hitding. With its diverse flora and fauna, and the culture of the indigenous peoples residing within the protected area, MIBNP is fast becoming an attraction to various types of audiences.

== Biodiversity Conservation Programs ==
Originally established as a ranching area, the park has witnessed a considerable reduction in its forest cover over the years. Presently, less than 3% of the primary forests remain intact, a noticeable massive decline of forest cover. Despite this, the park strives to protect remnants of lowland rain, mountain, and cloud forests housing critically threatened endemic animal species.

To monitor and preserve the park's biodiversity and ecosystems, a range of activities are being conducted within the protected area. These include regular Biodiversity Monitoring System (BMS) and Biodiversity Assessment and Monitoring Systems (BAMS), Annual Tamaraw Population Counts, targeted Communication, Education, and Public Awareness (CEPA) campaigns, promotion of ecotourism, sustainable agriculture, livelihood opportunities, ecosystems restoration, extensive patrolling and monitoring using SMART tool, and strict enforcement of applicable environmental and forestry laws.

The success of these conservation efforts is attributed to the steadfast support from various stakeholders, including the ASEAN Centre for Biodiversity (ACB), Mindoro Biodiversity Conservation Foundation, Inc. (MBCFI), D'Aboville Foundation (DAF) Inc., World Wildlife Fund (WWF), UNDP-BIOFIN, Far Eastern University, University of Santo Tomas-Project MATAPAT, Occidental Mindoro State University, and other local and international partners.

== The tamaraw ==
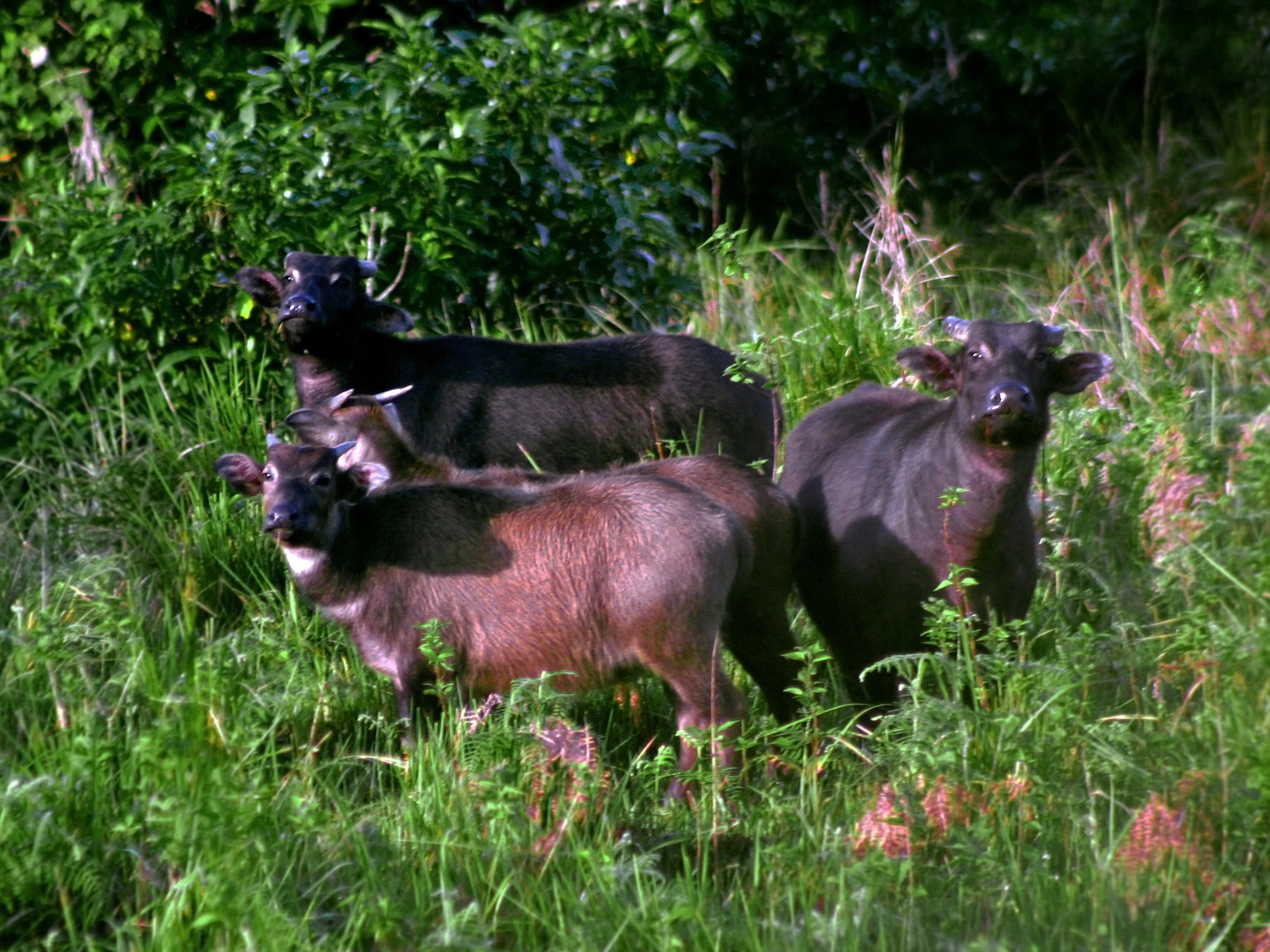
A small group of tamaraw bulls at the Mounts Iglit–Baco Natural Park

The park is the habitat of the endemic tamaraw (Bubalus mindorensis), a small, hoofed mammal of the bovid family unique to the Philippines that first documented in 1888. It is one of the most seriously endangered animals in the world. It was for this reason that the park was established, first as a game refuge and bird sanctuary in 1969 with an initial area of 8,956 hectares (22,130 acres), as a national park on November 11, 1970, then natural park in 2018.

In 1996, the IUCN declared the tamaraw as one of the top 10 endangered species on Earth, the highest risk rating for any species. In 2002, the tamaraw was classified as critically endangered (Criteria: C1), an upgrade listing from 1996 listing of endangered.

The tamaraw population is currently estimated at less than 600 individuals, from an estimated population of 10,000 in early 1990. More than 80% of the current population is presumed to be in only one sub-population in a restricted area "No hunting agreement area" within the Mts. Iglit-Baco Natural Park and adjacent areas encompassing about 2500 hectares. The traditional land-use practices from the residing Indigenous Communities and poaching incidents from lowlanders are currently the main threats to the viability of these subpopulations, limiting their chance to expand and increase their population.

The biggest population of tamaraw can be found in a mosaic of predominantly grasslands with patches of secondary forests in the southwestern interior of the park.

In April 2018, 523 tamaraws were spotted in the protected area. This is up from 327 spotted in 2012. Despite this population trend and ongoing efforts aimed at conserving and protecting this species, the threats to the tamaraw population within the protected area continue to escalate.

The Tamaraw Conservation Program

In 1979, the Tamaraw Gene Pool Farm, an off-site breeding facility was established under the Tamaraw Conservation Program (TCP) in Manoot, Rizal within MIBNP. From the inception of TCP in 1979 to date, several agencies have handled the implementation of the Project, including the Presidential Assistance for the National Minorities (PANANIM, 1979-1983); Office of the Muslim Affairs and Cultural Communities (OMACC, 1984); Ministry of Agriculture and Food (MAF, 1985-1986); Central Office of the Department of Environment and natural Resources in collaboration with the Conservation and Resource Management Foundation, Inc. (DENR & CRMF, 1987-1989); Protected Areas and Wildlife Bureau (PAWB, 1990-1997) with the assistance of the University of the Philippines Foundation, Inc. (UPLBF, 1990-1993 and 1995); and DENR MIMAROPA in 1998. In 1999, the management and supervision of the project was again placed under the PAWB, known today as the Biodiversity Management Bureau (BMB).The latter continues to implement the TCP to date (2024).

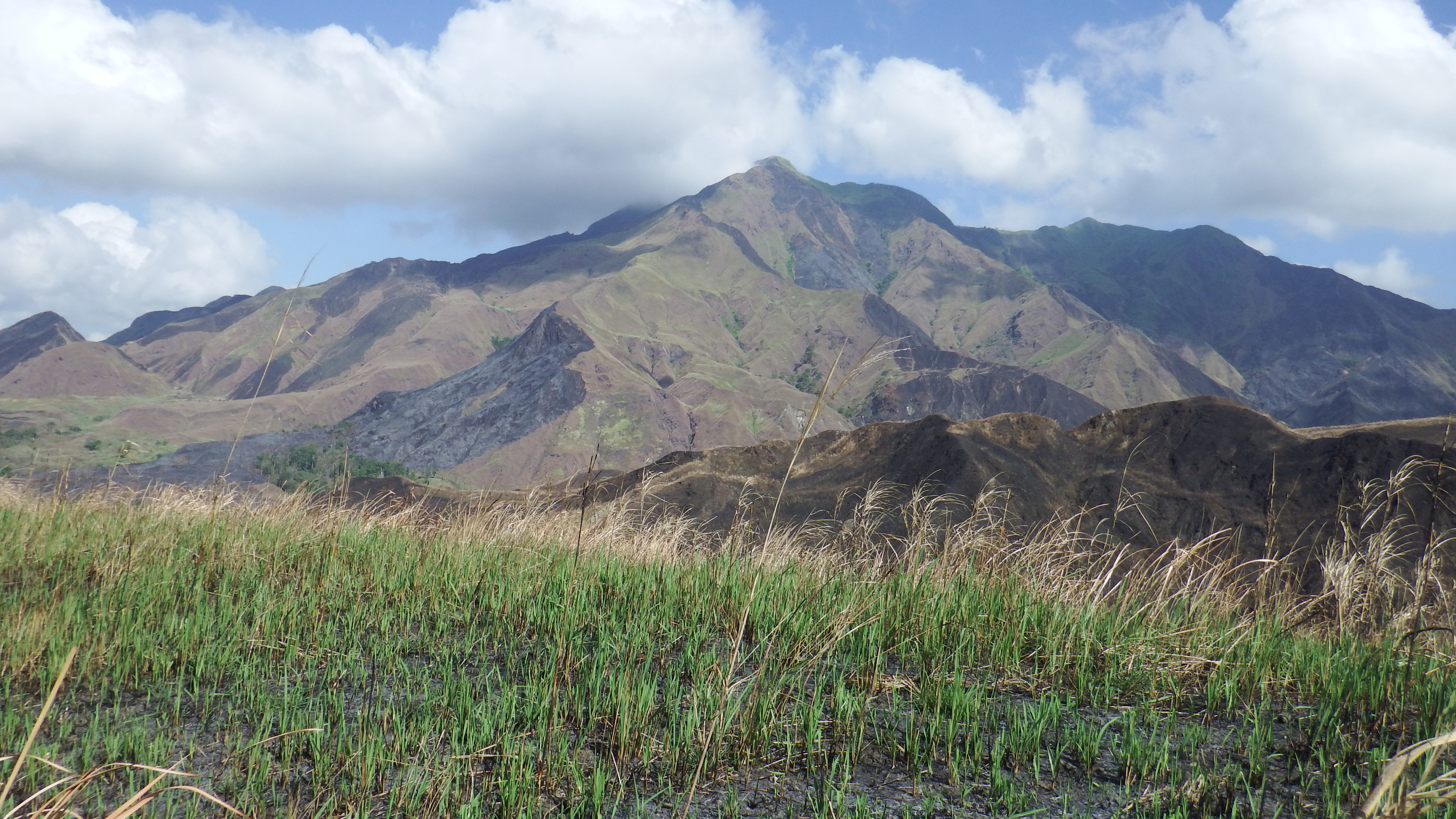
Mounts Iglit–Baco Natural Park is part of the sacred ancestral lands of both the Tao Buid Mangyans and the Buhid Mangyans. In Philippine mythology, for the Tao Buid of the northwest, the land is protected by their gigantic heroine-matriarch Rawtit, while for the Buhid of the southeast, the land was founded by their ancestors, Manggat and Sayum-ay.

== Other flora and fauna ==
Apart from the tamaraw, other forms of wildlife are also found within the park including the Mindoro climbing rat, Mindoro stripe-faced fruit bat, Philippine deer, and wild pigs. A number of bird species also inhabit the park like the Mindoro imperial pigeon, Mindoro scops owl, black-hooded coucal, scarlet-collared flowerpecker, Mindoro hornbill, Mindoro racket tail, Mindoro boobok, Mindoro bulbul, and Mindoro bleeding heart pigeon.

The park harbors at least 25 species of threatened floras. Some of the important indigenous plants found in the park are the kalantas tree, tindalo, almaciga, kamagong and the endangered jade vine.

== Protected Area Management Office ==
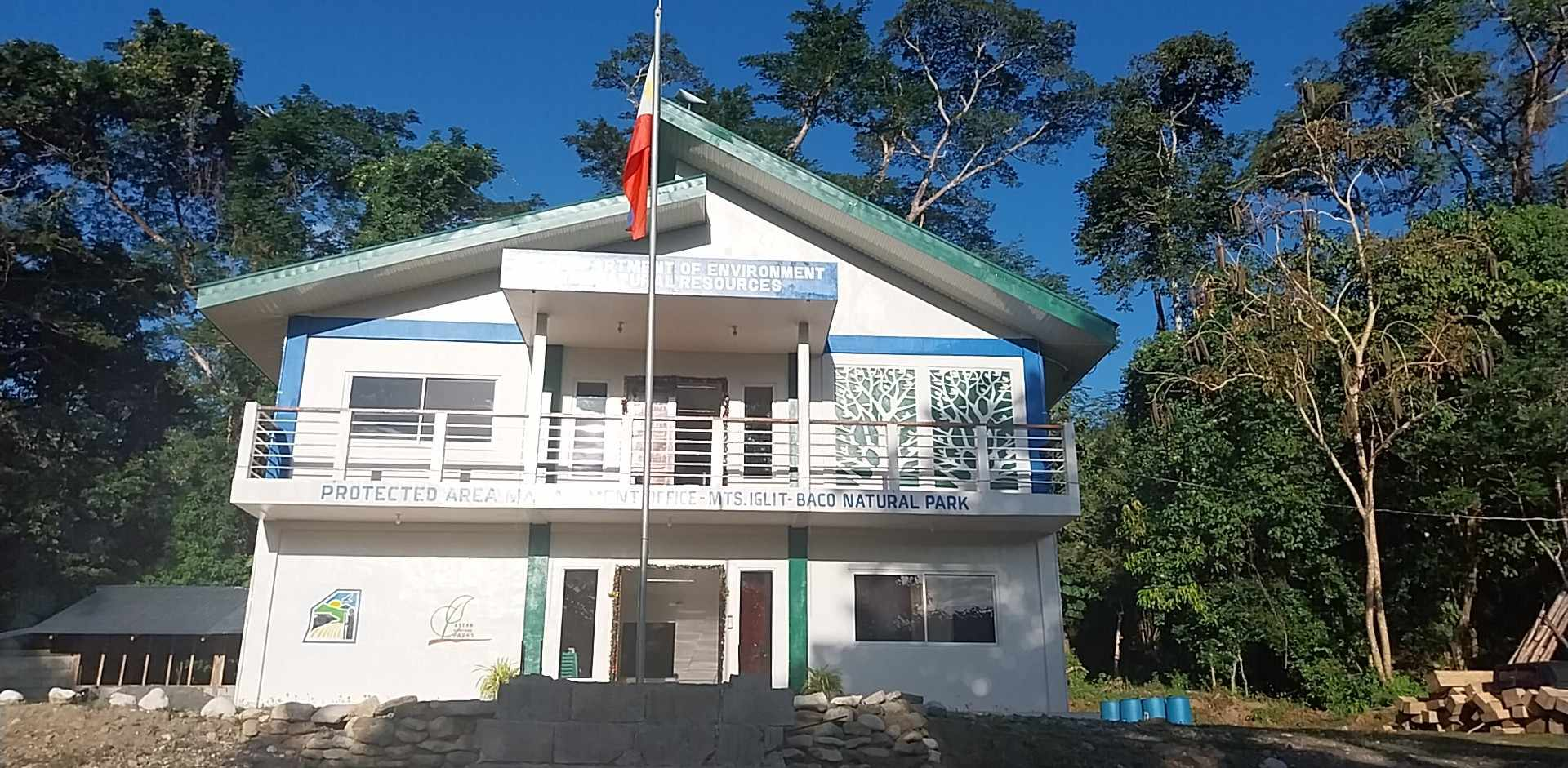
Mts. Iglit-Baco Natural Park - Protected Area Management Office (MIBNP-PAMO) Building located in Brgy. Poypoy, Calintaan, Occidental Mindoro

The Mts. Iglit-Baco Natural Park-Protected Area Management Office (MIBNP-PAMO), established in compliance to Section 11-B of RA 11038 (ENIPAS Act of 2018), as the mandated agency to ensure sustainable management and development of the park, is situated in Sitio Tamisan, Poypoy, Calintaan, Occidental Mindoro.

== See also ==
- List of natural parks of the Philippines
- List of World Heritage Sites in the Philippines
- List of Protected Areas of the Philippines
