= Roxas, Oriental Mindoro =

Municipality in Oriental Mindoro, Philippines

Roxas
- Municipality
- Municipality of Roxas
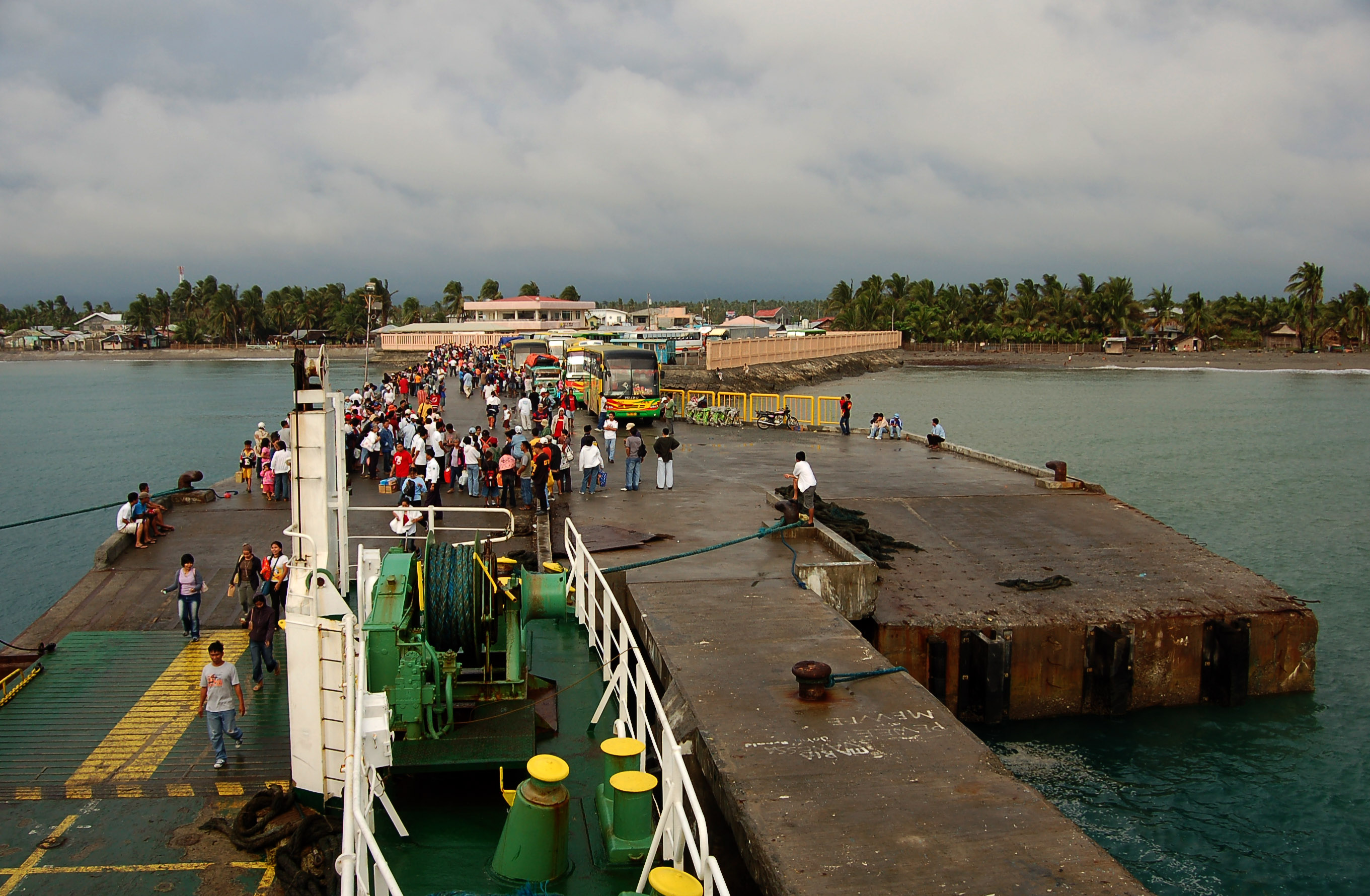
- Port of Roxas in Barangay Dangay

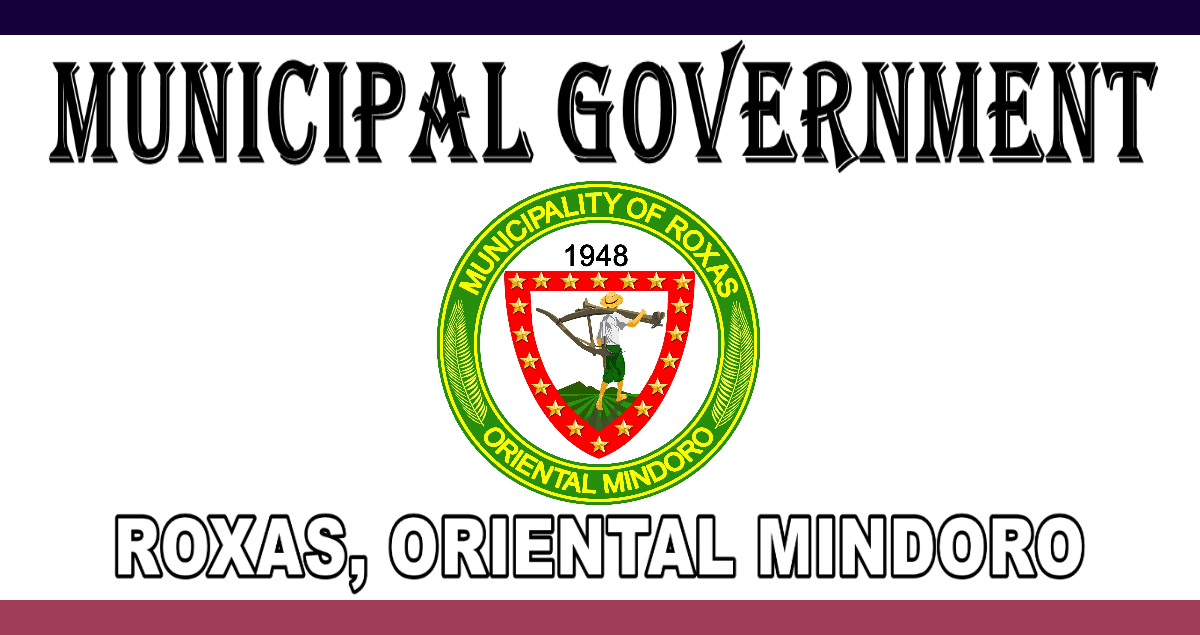
- Flag
- Nickname: The Center of Trade in Southern Mindoro
- Map of Oriental Mindoro with Roxas highlighted
- Interactive map of Roxas
- Location within the Philippines
- Coordinates: 12°35′N 121°30′E
- Country: Philippines
- Region: Mimaropa
- Province: Oriental Mindoro
- District: 2nd district
- Founded: November 15, 1948
- Named for: Manuel Roxas
- Barangays: 20 (see Barangays)

Government
  - Type: Sangguniang Bayan
  - Mayor: Jerwin S. Dimapilis
  - Vice Mayor: Robert S. Quiatchon
  - Representative: Alfonso V. Umali Jr.
  - Electorate: 39,643 voters (2025)

Area
  - Total: 85.26 km^{2} (32.92 sq mi)
- Elevation: 9.0 m (29.5 ft)
- Highest elevation: 2,571 m (8,435 ft)
- Lowest elevation: 0 m (0 ft)

Population (2024 census)
  - Total: 58,428
  - Density: 685.3/km^{2} (1,775/sq mi)
  - Households: 13,564
- Demonym: Roxaseño/a

Economy
  - Income class: 1st municipal income class
  - Poverty incidence: 24.38% (2023)
  - Revenue: ₱ 300.8 million (2024)
  - Assets: ₱ 558.7 million (2024)
  - Expenditure: ₱ 260.5 million (2024)
  - Liabilities: ₱ 79.26 million (2024)

Service provider
  - Electricity: Oriental Mindoro Electric Cooperative (ORMECO)
- Time zone: UTC+8 (PST)
- ZIP code: 5212
- PSGC: 1705212000
- IDD : area code: +63 (0)43
- Native languages: Romblomanon; Tagalog
- Website: www.roxasormindoro.gov.ph

Roxas, officially the Municipality of Roxas, is a municipality in the province of Oriental Mindoro, Philippines. According to the 2024 census, it has a population of 58,428 people.

== History ==
Founded by Andres Torrefiel on November 15, 1948, it was formerly known as Paclasan, originally a part of Bulalacao, Oriental Mindoro, then a barrio of Mansalay, Oriental Mindoro. It was named after President Manuel A. Roxas, the first town to be named as such since his death on April 15, 1948.

Marcelo I. Cabrera and Andres E. Torrefiel Sr. who served as mayors of Mansalay. After a meeting held at Mansalay attended by these two leaders with the Congressman of the lone district of the Province of Mindoro, Raul Leuterio, an agreement to separate Paclasan and its sitios from Mansalay as an independent municipality with the seat of government at Paclasan was reached. It was also agreed upon that the newly created municipality be named after the then President of the Republic, Manuel Acuna Roxas. However, it was President Elpidio Quirino, through Executive Order No. 181 dated October 15, 1948 who declared Roxas as an independent town from Mansalay because of the untimely death of President Roxas on April 15, 1948.

Although Executive Order No. 18, series of 1948 provided that the creation of the municipality of Roxas was to take effect on November 15, 1948, on account of a storm, it was celebrated on November 16, 1948. On that day, November 16, 1948, a program was held at Paclasan Barrio School with the Bongabon Orchestra playing for the occasion. Speeches were delivered by the then Congressman Raul Leuterio and Governor Conrado Morente. The program was ended by the message of Mr. Andres Estrella Torrefiel Sr. after his appointment and proclamation as Municipal Mayor of the newly created municipality of Roxas, Oriental Mindoro. The program was attended by the barrio lieutenants, the public school teachers, municipal officials and employees and the community people. Paclasan Barrio School was renamed to Roxas Central School. After the program, a meal was served at the residence of Mayor Andres E. Torrefiel Sr.

=== First town officials ===
The appointed officials Mayor Andres E. Torrefiel Sr. and Vice Mayor Florencio G. Taytay Sr., and the municipal councilors Sergio Glori, Maximo Fabila, Isabelo Halili, and Liberato Garfin, served as municipal officials from November 16, 1948, to December 31, 1951. The Municipal Treasurer of Mansalay, Quintin B. Cay, was appointed as Municipal Treasurer for Roxas. The Chief of Police was Nicanor Ladigohon and the Municipal Secretary Treasurer was Ildefonso Tesorero.

== Geography ==
Located 126 kilometers (78 mi) from the main capital city of Calapan, Roxas is the smallest municipality of Oriental Mindoro, with a total land area of 8,526 hectares (21,070 acres) of up-land, lowland, and coastal areas.

The municipal center of Roxas is situated at approximately 12° 35' North, 121° 31' East, in the island of Mindoro. Elevation at these coordinates is estimated at 10.5 meters (34 ft) above mean sea level.

=== Barangays ===
Map showing administrative divisions of Roxas, Oriental Mindoro

Roxas is politically subdivided into 20 barangays. Each barangay consists of puroks and some have sitios.

Currently, there are 4 barangays which classified as urban (highlighted in bold).

- Bagumbayan (Poblacion)
- Cantil
- Dangay
- Happy Valley
- Libertad
- Libtong
- Little Tanauan
- Mabuhay
- Maraska
- Odiong
- Paclasan (Poblacion)
- San Aquilino
- San Isidro
- San Jose
- San Mariano
- San Miguel
- San Rafael
- San Vicente
- Uyao
- Victoria

=== Climate ===
Climate data for Roxas, Oriental Mindoro
Month	Jan	Feb	Mar	Apr	May	Jun	Jul	Aug	Sep	Oct	Nov	Dec	Year
Mean daily maximum °C (°F)	28 (82)	29 (84)	30 (86)	31 (88)	31 (88)	30 (86)	29 (84)	29 (84)	29 (84)	29 (84)	29 (84)	28 (82)	29 (85)
Mean daily minimum °C (°F)	21 (70)	21 (70)	22 (72)	23 (73)	25 (77)	25 (77)	25 (77)	25 (77)	25 (77)	24 (75)	23 (73)	22 (72)	23 (74)
Average precipitation mm (inches)	31 (1.2)	20 (0.8)	25 (1.0)	39 (1.5)	152 (6.0)	269 (10.6)	314 (12.4)	285 (11.2)	303 (11.9)	208 (8.2)	95 (3.7)	70 (2.8)	1,811 (71.3)
Average rainy days	9.5	7.1	9.0	11.3	21.0	25.7	28.1	26.5	27.3	24.6	16.5	12.1	218.7
Source: Meteoblue

== Demographics ==
Population census of Roxas
Year	Pop.	±% p.a.
1960	16,940	—
1970	20,342	+1.84%
1975	24,273	+3.61%
1980	25,458	+0.96%
1990	33,178	+2.68%
1995	34,045	+0.48%
2000	41,265	+4.21%
2007	46,711	+1.72%
2010	49,854	+2.40%
2015	53,201	+1.25%
2020	58,849	+2.15%
2024	58,428	−0.17%
Source: Philippine Statistics Authority

== Economy ==
Poverty incidence of Roxas (%)

Source: Philippine Statistics Authority

In 2003, the Strong Republic Nautical Highway (SNRH) was inaugurated, resulting in the opening of the Port of Roxas, located in Barangay Dangay. The town then became a transit point to Boracay, Romblon (Odiongan and Sibuyan), and Palawan. Several shipping companies such as Starlite and Montenegro Shipping Lines serve this route.

The town is mostly agricultural, with palay, bananas, coconuts, rambutan, lansones, calamansi, and other fruits as primary agricultural crops. Barangays like Cantil, Victoria, Dangay, San Isidro, and Odiong are primarily planted with rice. Barangay Little Tanauan and San Miguel are noted for its fruit orchards and vegetables. Also, some upland barangays like Maraska, San Jose, and San Rafael have developed backyard goat raising.

The Municipal Government of Roxas generated a total income of ₱213 million for CY 2020 from Internal Revenue Allotment (IRA), tax revenue, service and business income and other Income. The largest income of the Municipal Government came from IRA which constitutes 71% of its total revenue.

== Government ==
=== Elected officials ===
Members of the municipal council (2025-2028):

- Municipal Mayor: Jerwin Sanque Dimapilis
- Vice Mayor: Robert Silas Quiatchon
- Councilors
  - Lucille Tesorero Bacay
  - Mayette Pajila
  - Den-den De la Cruz
  - Michael Pongyan
  - King Philip Dimapilis
  - Don Don Carvajal
  - Dodoy Magno
  - Robert Baticos

== Infrastructure ==
=== Transportation ===
The town is accessible through different modes of transportation. From Calapan, the town can be reached by public utility vans and buses. Roxas is the main port for vessels going to and coming from Caticlan, Malay, Aklan, which is approximately a 4-hour RORO ferry ride from the town. From Caticlan, it is just a short boat ride to the island of Boracay. Bus companies such as RORO Bus Transport, Dimple Star Bus Lines, and Ceres buses also serve the Manila-Roxas route.

=== Communication ===
Cellular phone signal from Dito, Globe and Smart is relatively strong in the town proper but not in some parts of the municipality. Terrestrial and cable television services are also available through CATSI, G Sat, Cignal Digital TV, Tamaraw Vision Network of Calapan, and ROMICOM (a local CATV network). Radio programming is available via 93.3 Brigada News FM and the DZRH affiliate 98.9 Radyo Natin Roxas.

== Education ==
The Roxas Schools District Office governs all educational institutions within the municipality. It oversees the management and operations of all private and public, from primary to secondary schools.

=== Primary and elementary schools ===
- B. T. Lazaro Memorial School
- Benito P. Garfin Elementary School
- Catalino Dizon Memorial School
- Dangay Elementary School
- Dela Vida Christian Montessori
- Gelacio I. Yason Foundation-Family Farm School
- Happy Valley Elementary School
- Libertad Elementary School
- Libtong Elementary School
- Little Tanauan Elementary School
- Lucio Suarez Sr. Memorial School
- Maranatha Christian Academy
- Maraska Elementary School
- P. Olarte Elementary School
- Paclasan Elementary School
- Raymundo Escarez Memorial School
- Roxas Adventist Elementary School
- Roxas Central School
- Roxas Mindoro Christian School
- Roxas Seventh-Day Adventist Academy
- San Aquilino Elementary School
- San Jose Elementary School
- San Juan Elementary School
- San Mariano Elementary School
- San Rafael Elementary School
- San Vicente Elementary School
- Santo Niño School
- Tagaskan Elementary School
- Tauga Diit Elementary School
- Uyao Elementary School
- Victoria Elementary School

=== Secondary schools ===
- Dangay National High School
- Gelacio I. Yason Foundation-Family Farm School
- John Paul College (High School)
- Marcelo I. Cabrera Vocational National High School
- Roxas Seventh-Day Adventist Academy
- San Mariano Academy
- San Mariano National High School
- San Vicente National High School
- Santo Niño School of Roxas

=== Higher educational institutions ===
- Clarendon College
- John Paul College
- Paradigm Colleges of Science and Technology
- Roxas Institute of Science and Technology
- Southern Mindoro Maritime School
