= Opao =

Opao can refer to the following places in the Philippines:

- Opao Island, in the municipality of Bulalacao, Oriental Mindoro
- Opao, a barangay in the city of Mandaue
- Opao, a barangay in the municipality of Pinamungajan, Cebu
- Opao, a barangay in the city of Dapitan, Zamboanga del Norte
