= DWDP =

Philippine radio station

Tropang Pinoy FM
Mansalay; Philippines
- Broadcast area: Southern Oriental Mindoro
- Frequency: 106.9 MHz
- Branding: DWDP 106.9 Tropang Pinoy FM

Programming
- Language: Filipino
- Format: Community radio

Ownership
- Owner: Armed Forces of the Philippines

Technical information
- Licensing authority: NTC
- Power: 1 kW

Links
- Website: 1069pinoyradio.weebly.com

DWDP (106.9 FM) Tropang Pinoy FM, is a radio station owned and operated by the Armed Forces of the Philippines through its Civil Affairs Group. Its studios and transmitter are located at the 4th Infantry (Scorpion) Battalion Advanced Command Post, Brgy Wasig, Mansalay.
