= Eastern Mindoro Institute of Technology and Sciences =

Educational institution in Oriental Mindoro, Philippines

Information
- Former names: Eastern Mindoro Academy; Eastern Mindoro Institute of Technology and Sciences
- Established: 1905; 120 years ago

EMA EMITS College Philippines (EECP), founded in 1905 as Eastern Mindoro Academy and later Eastern Mindoro Institute of Technology and Sciences (EMITS; 1986), is an educational institution in Pinamalayan in the province of Oriental Mindoro, Philippines.

== History ==
The school is located in the town of Pinamalayan, Oriental Mindoro. Before its incorporation in 1985, it was known as the Eastern Mindoro Academy (EMA), but in 1986 it was renamed as the Eastern Mindoro Institute of Technology and Sciences (EMITS). Attorney Federico Semilla, the founder of the institution, was a native of Marinduque who migrated with his family to Quinabigan, one of the barangays of the town. The school has a Prep and Kindergarten School, Complete Elementary & Secondary Courses, Commission on Higher Education (CHED) and Technical Skills and Development Authority (TESDA) courses.

== Activities ==
EMITS runs a student theatre, through the theatrical organization Tanghalan Ngani. It has produced plays including Evita: La Santa Peronista (September 2007), Joseph (February 2008), and EMITS High School Musical Plus (August 2008).

There are also school newspapers The Rainbow Times (in English), and Pulso ng EMITS (in Filipino). In 2007-2008, The Rainbow Times was named second best school paper in the regional schools press conference in Occidental Mindoro. Pulso ng EMITS was named best school paper at the same press conference. In the national press conference in Koronadal City, Pulso ng EMITS won second place in the Best Feature Page category.
