= Gloria, Oriental Mindoro =

Municipality in Oriental Mindoro, Philippines

Gloria
- Municipality
- Municipality of Gloria
- Nickname: Agricultural Production and Eco-Tourism Center of Oriental Mindoro
- Map of Oriental Mindoro with Gloria highlighted
- Interactive map of Gloria
- Location within the Philippines
- Coordinates: 12°58′20″N 121°28′40″E
- Country: Philippines
- Region: Mimaropa
- Province: Oriental Mindoro
- District: 2nd district
- Founded: October 1, 1964
- Named for: Gloria Macapagal Arroyo
- Barangays: 27 (see Barangays)

Government
  - Type: Sangguniang Bayan
  - Mayor: Teresita M. Ong
  - Vice Mayor: Wilfredo Condesa
  - Representative: Alfonso V. Umali Jr.
  - Electorate: 33,105 voters (2025)

Area
  - Total: 245.52 km^{2} (94.80 sq mi)
- Elevation: 15 m (49 ft)
- Highest elevation: 194 m (636 ft)
- Lowest elevation: 0 m (0 ft)

Population (2024 census)
  - Total: 52,296
  - Density: 213.00/km^{2} (551.67/sq mi)
  - Households: 12,050
- Demonym: Gloriano/a

Economy
  - Income class: 1st municipal income class
  - Poverty incidence: 22.78% (2023)
  - Revenue: ₱ 258.8 million (2024)
  - Assets: ₱ 681.9 million (2024)
  - Expenditure: ₱ 251.4 million (2024)
  - Liabilities: ₱ 120.2 million (2024)

Service provider
  - Electricity: Oriental Mindoro Electric Cooperative (ORMECO)
- Time zone: UTC+8 (PST)
- ZIP code: 5209
- PSGC: 1705206000
- IDD : area code: +63 (0)43
- Native languages: Tawbuid; Tagalog
- Website: www.gloria.gov.ph

Gloria, officially the Municipality of Gloria (Tagalog: Bayan ng Gloria), is a municipality in the province of Oriental Mindoro, Philippines. According to the 2024 census, it has a population of 52,296 people.

The town was previously a barangay called Maligaya within the municipality of Pinamalayan, Maligaya was the largest barangay during the administration of President Diosdado Macapagal. Local politicians advocated for the conversion of Maligaya & adjacent barangays into a new town. They renamed it after the ten-year-old daughter of the President, who later on herself became the fourteenth President in 2001. Barangay Maligaya eventually became the capital (poblacion).

== History ==
Gloria was once part of the municipality of Pinamalayan. In 1915, migrant families from Marinduque settled in Barrio Tambong, and in 1930, when a national road was built through Pinamalayan, they moved west and occupied the area along this road. Tambong was later divided into two barrios: the first retained the original name, while the second was called Maligaya (meaning "happy"), alluding to the settlers' happiness at the bountiful yield of their agricultural crops.

The residents of 25 barrios (Maligaya, Kawit, Malusak, Balite, Dalagan, Tinalunan, Calamundingan, Bulbogan, Langang, Banus, Agus, Batingan, Papandungin, Malamig, Tubag, Malayong, Malubay, Mirayan, Guimbonan, Agsalin, Manguyang, Banutan, Boong-Lupa, Tambong and Maragooc) grouped together and petitioned for the separation of their barrios from the municipality of Pinamalayan. The petition was granted on October 1, 1964, through Executive Order No. 117 issued by President Macapagal. Executive Order No. 140, issued on February 25, 1965, by the same President, defined and fixed the boundaries of Gloria as a new municipality. On December 24, 1965, however, the Supreme Court nullified its status as a municipality. Gloria was finally recognized as a distinct municipality on June 9, 1966, when Housebill No. 6107, sponsored by Congressman Luciano Joson, was enacted into law. (It later became known as RA 4651.)

The new municipality was named Gloria, primarily as a token of gratitude to the President, whose daughter is named Gloria, and secondarily from the word "glory", celebrating the settlers' "glorious" life in Barrio Maligaya.

Barrio Maligaya later became the poblacion and the official seat of the municipal government. Former guerrilla chief Nicolas M. Jamilla Sr. was appointed first Mayor of Gloria by President Macapagal, serving from 1964 to 1967. He then ran in the local election of 1967 and won. The first session of the Municipal Council was held in the residence of Mr. Albino Janda. The town's official functions were held in this house from February 1964 to November 1965; then in the residences of Genaro Olavidez from March to June 1965 and Arsenio Arriola from July 1965 to 1973.

The name of the following barangays were changed: Bulbugan to Santa Maria; Dalagan to San Antonio; Malusak to Narra; Batingan to A. Bonifacio; Tubag to Macario Adriatico; Tinalunan to Gaudencio Antonino; Langang to Santa Theresa and Calamundingan to Lucio Laurel. The new barangays of Bulaklakan and Alma Villa were created later. In 1968, a legal entity called "GLORIA REALTY & DEV. CORP." (Gloria Realty Development Corporation) donated two hectares to the municipality, and this became the site of the Municipal Building in 1972. Under the leadership of Mayor Jamilla, the municipality later bought a ten-hectare lot, which became the site of the Municipal Cemetery, Sports Center, Agricultural Center and Breeding Station, and the Medicare Hospital.

In late 2009, the "extension classes"/Annex of Malamig National High School (MNHS-EC) in the town proper, was converted to an altogether new high school and accordingly named after/memorialized President Macapagal. Her daughter, the namesake of the municipality, was the then current president. The classes were operating as early as 9 years prior in the block where the original public market [now home to Institute of Science and Technology & MDRRMO] was situated and adjacent block where the Jesus V. Punzalan Mutli-purpose Gymnasium currently is, in makeshift arrangements. In front of the said gymnasium, some "rooms" composed of a mix of nipa, coconut leaves and cogon (for roofing and walls) and bamboo for structure reinforcements, were constructed & used to accommodate student demand.

In October 2016, anticrime crusader Zenaida Luz, 51 was shot dead at Barangay Maligaya by the then Police Chief of Socorro and another policeman assigned to the province's Provincial Public Safety Company, disguised a "riding-in-tandem". They were allowed to post a million pesos bail and returned to active service(albeit on a limited/restricted basis such as not being authorized to carry & draw their service firearm). Over three years later, they were acquitted by the trial court for the prosecution's failure to prove their guilt beyond reasonable doubt. The petitioners intend to appeal [all the way to the Supreme Court]. Luz's sister, Perlita alleges that the suspects tried to pay them 2.5 million pesos to drop the case and the policemen who nabbed them also received threats.

== Geography ==
Gloria is located 77 kilometres (48 mi) from the provincial capital, Calapan.

It is one of the 7 towns comprising Oriental Mindoro's second congressional district. On its north lies its mother town Pinamalayan, on the west is the town of Sablayan in Occidental Mindoro. In the south is the town of Bansud, while on the east is the Tablas Strait.

=== Barangays ===
Map showing administrative divisions of Gloria, Oriental Mindoro

Gloria is politically subdivided into 27 barangays. Each barangay consists of puroks and some have sitios.

Nine (9) barangays are situated along the national highway - Bulaklakan, Maligaya, Kawit, Narra, Balete, Lucio Laurel, G. Antonino, Santa Maria and Banus; six (6) are coastal barangays - Tambong, San Antonio, Santa Theresa, Guimbonan, Maragooc and Agsalin; and twelve (12) interior barangays on the west side - Agos, A. Bonifacio, Alma Villa, Mirayan, Buong Lupa, Malamig, Malubay, M. Adriatico, Papandungin, Malayong, Banutan and Manguyang.

- Agsalin
- Agos
- Alma Villa
- Andres Bonifacio
- Balete
- Banus
- Banutan
- Buong Lupa
- Bulaklakan
- Gaudencio Antonino
- Guimbonan
- Kawit
- Lucio Laurel
- Macario Adriatico
- Malamig
- Malayong
- Maligaya (Poblacion)
- Malubay
- Manguyang
- Maragooc
- Mirayan
- Narra
- Papandungin
- San Antonio
- Santa Maria
- Santa Theresa
- Tambong

=== Climate ===
Climate data for Gloria, Oriental Mindoro
Month	Jan	Feb	Mar	Apr	May	Jun	Jul	Aug	Sep	Oct	Nov	Dec	Year
Mean daily maximum °C (°F)	26 (79)	28 (82)	29 (84)	31 (88)	31 (88)	30 (86)	29 (84)	29 (84)	29 (84)	29 (84)	28 (82)	27 (81)	29 (84)
Mean daily minimum °C (°F)	22 (72)	22 (72)	22 (72)	23 (73)	25 (77)	25 (77)	25 (77)	25 (77)	25 (77)	24 (75)	23 (73)	23 (73)	24 (75)
Average precipitation mm (inches)	115 (4.5)	66 (2.6)	55 (2.2)	39 (1.5)	164 (6.5)	282 (11.1)	326 (12.8)	317 (12.5)	318 (12.5)	192 (7.6)	119 (4.7)	173 (6.8)	2,166 (85.3)
Average rainy days	13.6	9.4	10.4	10.5	21.1	26.0	29.0	27.6	27.5	23.1	16.7	16.1	231
Source: Meteoblue

== Demographics ==
Population census of Gloria
Year	Pop.	±% p.a.
1970	20,147	—
1975	22,249	+2.01%
1980	25,291	+2.60%
1990	30,102	+1.76%
1995	35,771	+3.29%
2000	38,667	+1.68%
2007	40,561	+0.66%
2010	42,012	+1.29%
2015	45,073	+1.35%
2020	50,496	+2.42%
2024	52,296	+0.84%
Source: Philippine Statistics Authority

== Economy ==
Poverty incidence of Gloria (%)

Source: Philippine Statistics Authority

== Government ==
=== Elected officials ===
Members of the municipal council (2025-2028):

Officials	Political Party
Ong, Teresita (Mayor)	Lakas CMD
Condesa, Wilfredo (Vice Mayor)	Lakas CMD
Councilors	Political Party
Bawasanta, Crispin	PFP
Fampulme, Timo	Lakas CMD
Alvarez, George Voltaire	LP
Lalo, Cheska	LP
Ong, Nelcy	Lakas CMD
Nelson, Diona	PFP

=== List of former chief executives ===
- Nicolas M. Jamilla, Sr. (1964–1986; 1988–1995)+
- Amando Medrano (1986–1987)+
- Felix V. Jarabe (1987)+
- Alonzo San Agustin (1987–1988)+
- Jimmy S. de Castro (1995–2001)
- Romeo D. Alvarez (2001–2010)+
- Loreto S. Pérez (2010-2016)+
- German Rodegerio (2016-2025)

== Culture ==
=== Events ===
- February 14–15: Town fiesta honouring the Sacred Heart of Jesus
- September 29 to October 1: Kawayanan Festival
  - Through Presidential Proclamation 688, October 1, 2024 was declared a special non-working day for the celebration of the Kawayanan Festival.
- October 1: Foundation Day

== Education ==
The Gloria Schools District Office (of the DepEd) governs all (private and public), elementary & secondary-level educational institutions within the municipality. It oversees the management and operations of such.

=== Primary and elementary schools ===
- Agos Elementary School
- Agsalin Elementary School
- Almavilla Elementary School
- Balete Elementary School
- Banus Elementary School
- Banutan Elementary School
- Batingan Elementary School
- Bulaklakan Elementary School
- Bulbugan Elementary School
- Buong Lupa Elementary School
- CLJC Center for Excellence and Development Academy Foundation
- Dalagan Elementary School
- Don Joaquin Roque Memorial School
- Gloria Central School
- Kawit Elementary School
- Langgang Elementary School
- Manuel Sadiwa Sr. Memorial Elementary School
- Malamig Elementary School
- Malayong Elementary School
- Malubay Elementary School
- Malusak Elementary School
- Manguyang Elementary School
- Maragooc Elementary School
- Melecio D. Cantos Elementary School (Tubag Elementary School)
- Mirayan Elementary School
- Pakpaklawin Elementary School
- Papandungin Elementary School
- Sacred Heart Academy
- Tambong Elementary School
- Tinalunan Elementary School

=== Secondary schools ===
- Bulbugan National High School
- CLJC Center for Excellence and Development Academy
- Malamig National High School
- Manuel Adriano Memorial National High School
- Oriental Mindoro Institute
- President Diosdado Macapagal Memorial National High School
- Sacred Heart Academy

=== Higher educational institutions ===
- Erhard Science and Technological Institute
- Gloria Institute of Science and Technology

== Notable personalities ==
- Zaijian Jaranilla - Filipino actor and model who has primary allegiance with ABS-CBN Corporation under Star Magic while having secondary ones conditionally with other media companies (GMA Network and TV5 Network) and best known for his role as the orphan Santino in the 2009–2013 ABS-CBN religious-themed teleserye, May Bukas Pa
- Zymic Jaranilla - Zaijian Jaranilla's sibling who originally worked with ABS-CBN briefly and currently a GMA Network contract artist.
