= Oriental Mindoro's 2nd congressional district =

Legislative district of the Philippines

- Constituency for the House of Representatives of the Philippines
- Location of Oriental Mindoro within the Philippines
- Province: Oriental Mindoro
- Region: Mimaropa
- Population: 391,151 (2015)
- Electorate: 231,200 (2019)
- Major settlements: 7 LGUs: Municipalities; Bansud; Bongabong; Bulalacao; Gloria; Mansalay; Pinamalayan; Roxas
- Area: 2,223.19 km^{2} (858.38 sq mi)

Current constituency
- Created: 1987
- Representative: Alfonso Umali Jr.
- Political party: Liberal
- Congressional bloc: Majority

Oriental Mindoro's 2nd congressional district is one of the two congressional districts of the Philippines in the province of Oriental Mindoro. It has been represented in the House of Representatives since 1987. The district encompasses the province's southern half composed of the municipalities of Bansud, Bongabong, Bulalacao, Gloria, Mansalay, Pinamalayan and Roxas facing the provinces of Marinduque and Romblon, and the Visayas region. It is currently represented in the 20th Congress by Alfonso Umali Jr. of the Liberal Party (LP).

== Representation history ==
#	Image	Member	Term of office		Congress	Party	Electoral history	Constituent LGUs
#	Image	Member	Start	End	Congress	Party	Electoral history	Constituent LGUs
=== Oriental Mindoro's 2nd district for the House of Representatives of the Philippines ===
District created February 2, 1987 from Oriental Mindoro's at-large district.
1		Jesus M. Punzalan	June 30, 1987	June 30, 1998	8th	Liberal	Elected in 1987.	1987–present Bansud, Bongabong, Bulalacao, Gloria, Mansalay, Pinamalayan, Roxas
1		Jesus M. Punzalan	June 30, 1987	June 30, 1998	9th	Lakas	Re-elected in 1992.	1987–present Bansud, Bongabong, Bulalacao, Gloria, Mansalay, Pinamalayan, Roxas
1		Jesus M. Punzalan	June 30, 1987	June 30, 1998	10th	Lakas	Re-elected in 1995.	1987–present Bansud, Bongabong, Bulalacao, Gloria, Mansalay, Pinamalayan, Roxas
2		Manuel G. Andaya	June 30, 1998	June 30, 2001	11th	LAMMP	Elected in 1998.	1987–present Bansud, Bongabong, Bulalacao, Gloria, Mansalay, Pinamalayan, Roxas
3		Alfonso Umali Jr.	June 30, 2001	June 30, 2010	12th	Liberal	Elected in 2001.	1987–present Bansud, Bongabong, Bulalacao, Gloria, Mansalay, Pinamalayan, Roxas
3		Alfonso Umali Jr.	June 30, 2001	June 30, 2010	13th	Liberal	Re-elected in 2004.	1987–present Bansud, Bongabong, Bulalacao, Gloria, Mansalay, Pinamalayan, Roxas
3		Alfonso Umali Jr.	June 30, 2001	June 30, 2010	14th	Liberal	Re-elected in 2007.	1987–present Bansud, Bongabong, Bulalacao, Gloria, Mansalay, Pinamalayan, Roxas
4		Reynaldo Umali	June 30, 2010	June 30, 2019	15th	Liberal	Elected in 2010.	1987–present Bansud, Bongabong, Bulalacao, Gloria, Mansalay, Pinamalayan, Roxas
4		Reynaldo Umali	June 30, 2010	June 30, 2019	16th	Liberal	Re-elected in 2013.	1987–present Bansud, Bongabong, Bulalacao, Gloria, Mansalay, Pinamalayan, Roxas
4		Reynaldo Umali	June 30, 2010	June 30, 2019	17th	PDP–Laban	Re-elected in 2016.	1987–present Bansud, Bongabong, Bulalacao, Gloria, Mansalay, Pinamalayan, Roxas
(3)		Alfonso Umali Jr.	June 30, 2019	Incumbent	18th	Liberal	Elected in 2019.	1987–present Bansud, Bongabong, Bulalacao, Gloria, Mansalay, Pinamalayan, Roxas
(3)		Alfonso Umali Jr.	June 30, 2019	Incumbent	19th	Liberal	Re-elected in 2022.	1987–present Bansud, Bongabong, Bulalacao, Gloria, Mansalay, Pinamalayan, Roxas
(3)		Alfonso Umali Jr.	June 30, 2019	Incumbent	20th	Liberal	Re-elected in 2025.	1987–present Bansud, Bongabong, Bulalacao, Gloria, Mansalay, Pinamalayan, Roxas

== See also ==
- Legislative districts of Oriental Mindoro
