= Bulalacao =

Municipality in Oriental Mindoro, Philippines

Bulalacao San Pedro
- Municipality
- Municipality of Bulalacao
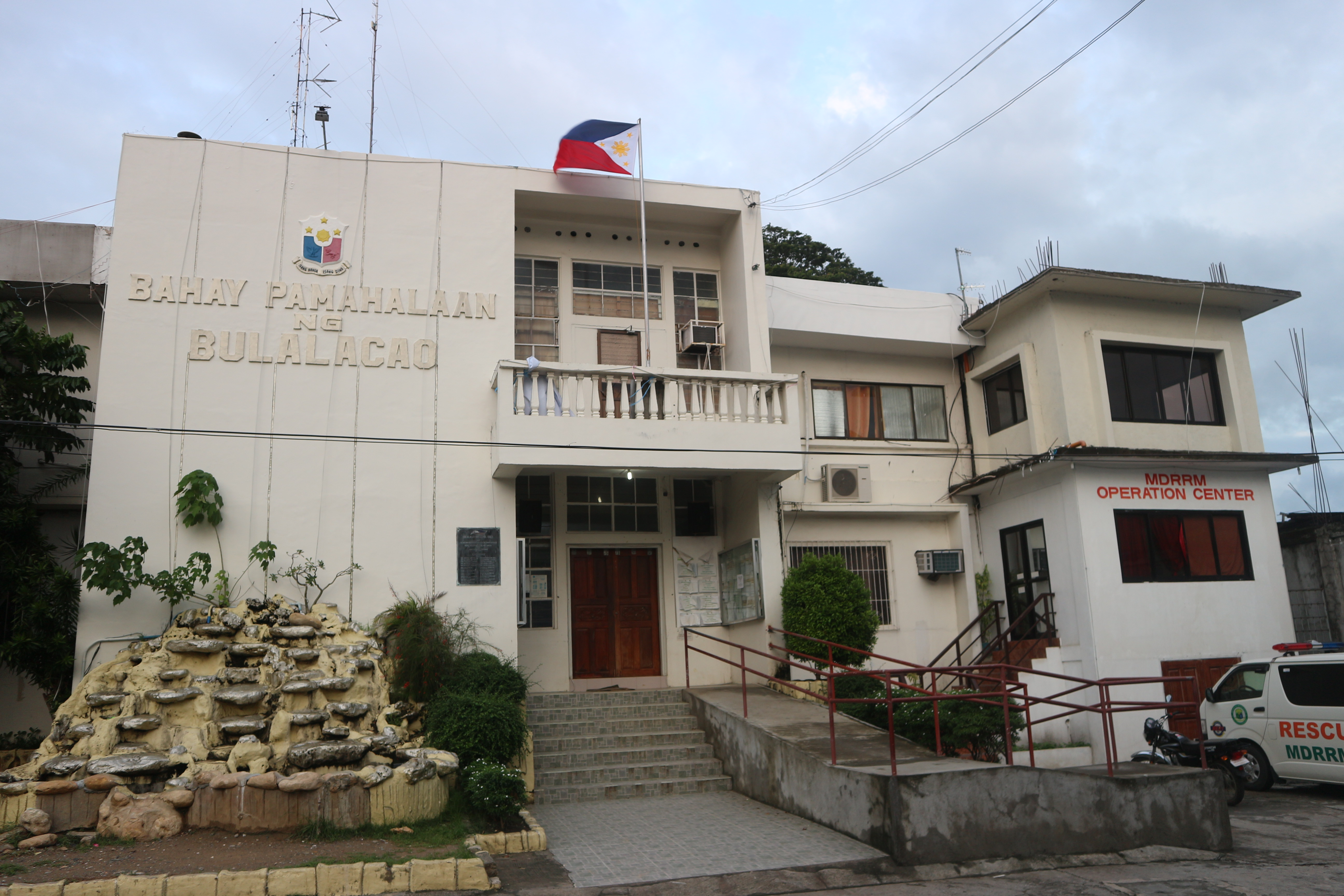
- Bulalacao Town Hall

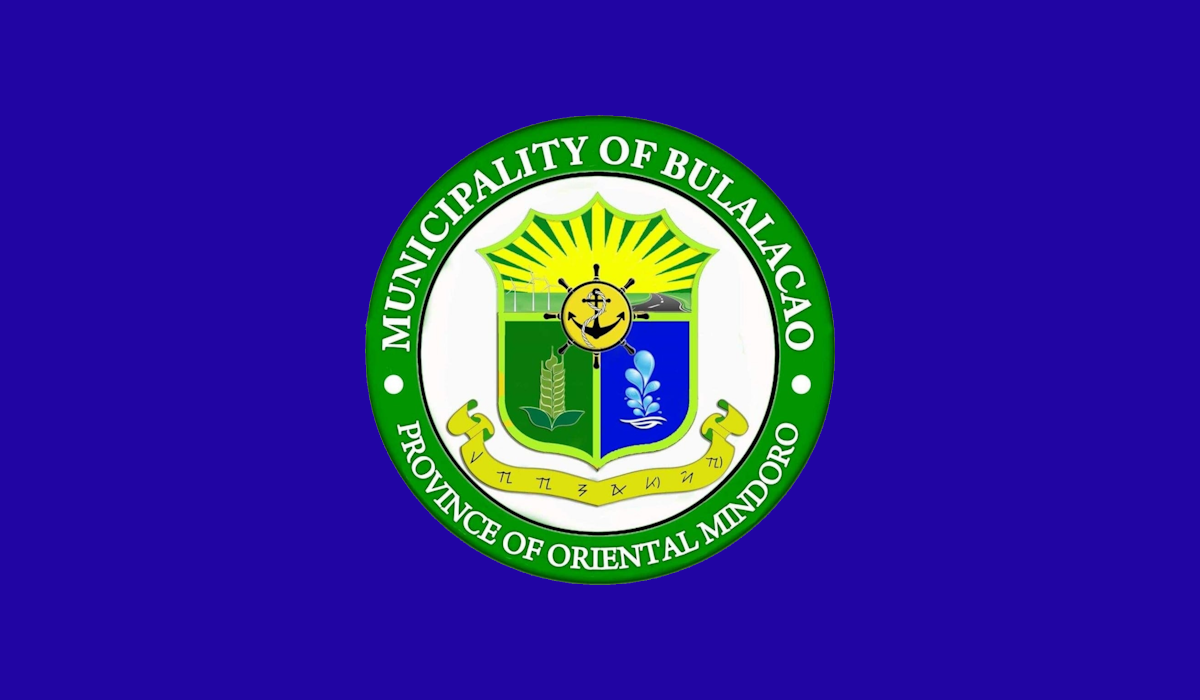
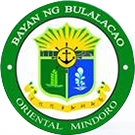
- Flag Seal
- Etymology: meteorite, shooting star
- Nickname: The Gem of Oriental Mindoro
- Map of Oriental Mindoro with Bulalacao highlighted
- Interactive map of Bulalacao
- Location within the Philippines
- Coordinates: 12°19′30″N 121°20′35″E
- Country: Philippines
- Region: Mimaropa
- Province: Oriental Mindoro
- District: 2nd district
- Barangays: 15 (see Barangays)

Government
  - Type: Sangguniang Bayan
  - Mayor: Lumel LG Cabagay
  - Vice Mayor: German Acosta
  - Representative: Alfonso V. Umali Jr.
  - Electorate: 27,509 voters (2025)

Area
  - Total: 321.86 km^{2} (124.27 sq mi)
- Elevation: 42 m (138 ft)
- Highest elevation: 283 m (928 ft)
- Lowest elevation: 0 m (0 ft)

Population (2024 census)
  - Total: 46,439
  - Density: 144.28/km^{2} (373.69/sq mi)
  - Households: 9,865
- Demonym: Bulalacaonon

Economy
  - Income class: 1st municipal income class
  - Poverty incidence: 37.66% (2023)
  - Revenue: ₱ 294 million (2024)
  - Assets: ₱ 906.4 million (2024)
  - Expenditure: ₱ 277.1 million (2024)
  - Liabilities: ₱ 196.3 million (2024)

Service provider
  - Electricity: Oriental Mindoro Electric Cooperative (ORMECO)
- Time zone: UTC+8 (PST)
- ZIP code: 5214
- PSGC: 1705204000
- IDD : area code: +63 (0)43
- Native languages: Ratagnon; Romblomanon; Tagalog
- Website: www.bulalacaomindoro.com

Bulalacao, officially the Municipality of Bulalacao (Tagalog: Bayan ng Bulalacao), is a municipality in the province of Oriental Mindoro, Philippines. According to the 2024 census, it has a population of 46,439 people.

It is formerly known as San Pedro.

== History ==
=== Precolonial period ===
Ma-i was a medieval state first recorded in Chinese documents, such as the History of Song and the Zhu Fan Zhi (1225) by Zhao Rukuo. Ma-i was described to be located north of Borneo, and were highly competitive in the trade with China. While the exact location of Ma-i remains disputed, most historians agree that it was located in Mindoro, specifically at the Mauhaw River around Bulalacao according to William Henry Scott. This is corroborated by Spanish records, such as the account of Juan Francisco de San Antonio, called the Chronicas de N.S.P. Francisco en las Islas Filipinas, China y Japón 1738, where Chapter 36 of the book is called De la Provincia y Isla de Mait o Mindoro ("The Province of the Island of Mait or Mindoro"), showing that the term Mait and Mindoro were once interchangeable.

Historical records in the National Archives of the Philippines have shown Bulalacao engaging in barangay network trade alliance with neighboring polities. Colonial documents point to this fact. Evidence shows that Nicolás Contreras, the ruler of Bulalacao, along with his vassal maginoó, entered into alliances with the ruler of Mansalay and their subject maginoó, in trade agreements with the Spanish colonial government in Manila.

Since at least the 1700s, Bulalacao has been ruled by the Contreras clan as the Panginoón Basal. The clan is one of a few Filipino families with clear descent from ancient maginoó lineage.

=== Spanish to early American period ===
In the early 19th century, Datu Calido of Panay was in control of Bulalacao. Following the expansion of the settlement, it was ruled by the capitanes. They were Gabriel Contreras as Gobernadorcillo, with vassal datu: Paigao, Jacinto Pajado and Narciso Pandino. They ruled the area until the arrival of Lieutenant Morris in 1903. In 1906, the settlement became a township which included Paclasan, Mansalay, Mangaring, and the islands of Caluya, Sibay and Semirara.

=== Modern period ===
On May 7, 1995, re-electionist Mayor Guillermo Salas was assassinated a day before the midterm elections by Rodel Gonzáles of the Mangyan tribe; Gonzáles eventually surrendered to authorities five days later and confessed to the crime.

== Geography ==
Bulalacao is located at the southernmost tip of the province and is 176 kilometres (109 mi) from the provincial capital Calapan and 50 kilometres (31 mi) from Roxas.

It is bounded by the Municipality of Mansalay to the North, Bulalacao Bay to the South, Tablas Strait to the East and the Municipality of Magsaysay in Occidental Mindoro to the West.

=== Barangays ===
Map showing administrative divisions of Bulalacao, Oriental Mindoro

Bulalacao is politically subdivided into 16 barangays. Each barangay consists of puroks and some have sitios.

- Bagong Sikat
- Balatasan
- Benli (Mangyan Settlement)
- Cabugao
- Cambunang
- Campaasan
- Liwagao
- Maasin
- Maujao
- Milagrosa (Guiob)
- Nasukob
- Poblacion
- San Francisco (Alimawan)
- San Isidro
- San Juan
- San Roque (Buyayao)

=== Climate ===
Climate data for Bulalacao, Oriental Mindoro
Month	Jan	Feb	Mar	Apr	May	Jun	Jul	Aug	Sep	Oct	Nov	Dec	Year
Mean daily maximum °C (°F)	29 (84)	30 (86)	30 (86)	31 (88)	31 (88)	30 (86)	29 (84)	30 (86)	29 (84)	29 (84)	29 (84)	29 (84)	30 (85)
Mean daily minimum °C (°F)	23 (73)	23 (73)	23 (73)	23 (73)	24 (75)	25 (77)	25 (77)	24 (75)	24 (75)	24 (75)	24 (75)	24 (75)	24 (75)
Average precipitation mm (inches)	45 (1.8)	34 (1.3)	62 (2.4)	64 (2.5)	127 (5.0)	159 (6.3)	172 (6.8)	147 (5.8)	167 (6.6)	182 (7.2)	172 (6.8)	88 (3.5)	1,419 (56)
Average rainy days	12.1	9.4	13.0	14.3	22.7	26.9	28.0	26.4	27.0	27.0	22.7	17.8	247.3
Source: Meteoblue

== Demographics ==
Population census of Bulalacao
Year	Pop.	±% p.a.
1903	3,754	—
1918	6,224	+3.43%
1939	3,497	−2.71%
1948	3,597	+0.31%
1960	5,414	+3.47%
1970	10,857	+7.20%
1975	14,038	+5.29%
1980	16,926	+3.81%
1990	21,316	+2.33%
1995	24,047	+2.28%
2000	27,698	+3.08%
2007	30,188	+1.19%
2010	33,754	+4.15%
2015	39,107	+2.84%
2020	44,366	+2.69%
2024	46,439	+1.10%
Source: Philippine Statistics Authority

== Economy ==
Poverty incidence of Bulalacao (%)

Source: Philippine Statistics Authority

== Transportation ==
Bulalacao has a port that serves as a gateway from Mindoro to Caticlan in Malay, Aklan. FastCat operates in the port.

== Education ==
The Bulalacao Schools District Office governs all educational institutions within the municipality. It oversees the management and operations of all private and public, from primary to secondary schools.

=== Primary and elementary schools ===
- Abintang Elementary School
- Agong Elementary School
- Alimawan Elementary School
- Bagong Sikat Elementary School
- Bailan Elementary School
- Balang Elementary School
- Balatasan Elementary School
- Balditan Primary School
- Bangkal Elementary School
- Bating Elementary School
- Benli Elementary School
- Bulalacao Central School
- Cabugao Elementary School
- Cambunang Elementary School
- Campaasan Elementary School
- Dangkalan Elementary School
- Lambok Elementary School
- Libtong Elementary School
- Lower Yunot Elementary School
- Maasin Elementary School
- Maujao Elementary School
- Milagrosa Elementary School
- Nasucob Elementary School
- Pawikan Elementary School
- San Isidro Elementary School
- San Juan Elementary School
- San Miguel Elementary School
- San Roque Elementary School
- San Vicente Elementary School
- SCLC Adventist School
- Tambangan Elementary School
- Ugyong Katutubong Mangyan Elementary School
- Umabang Elementary School
- Upper Yunot Elementary School
- Waring Elementary School

=== Secondary schools ===
- Balatasan National High School
- Benli National High School
- Bulalacao National High School
- Cabugao National High School
- Gatol Mangyan High School
- Maasin High School
- Maujao National High School
- Milagrosa National High School
- San Roque National High School
- San Roque National High School (Bangkal Ext)

== See also ==
- List of renamed cities and municipalities in the Philippines
- List of political families in the Philippines
