= Port of Roxas, Oriental Mindoro =

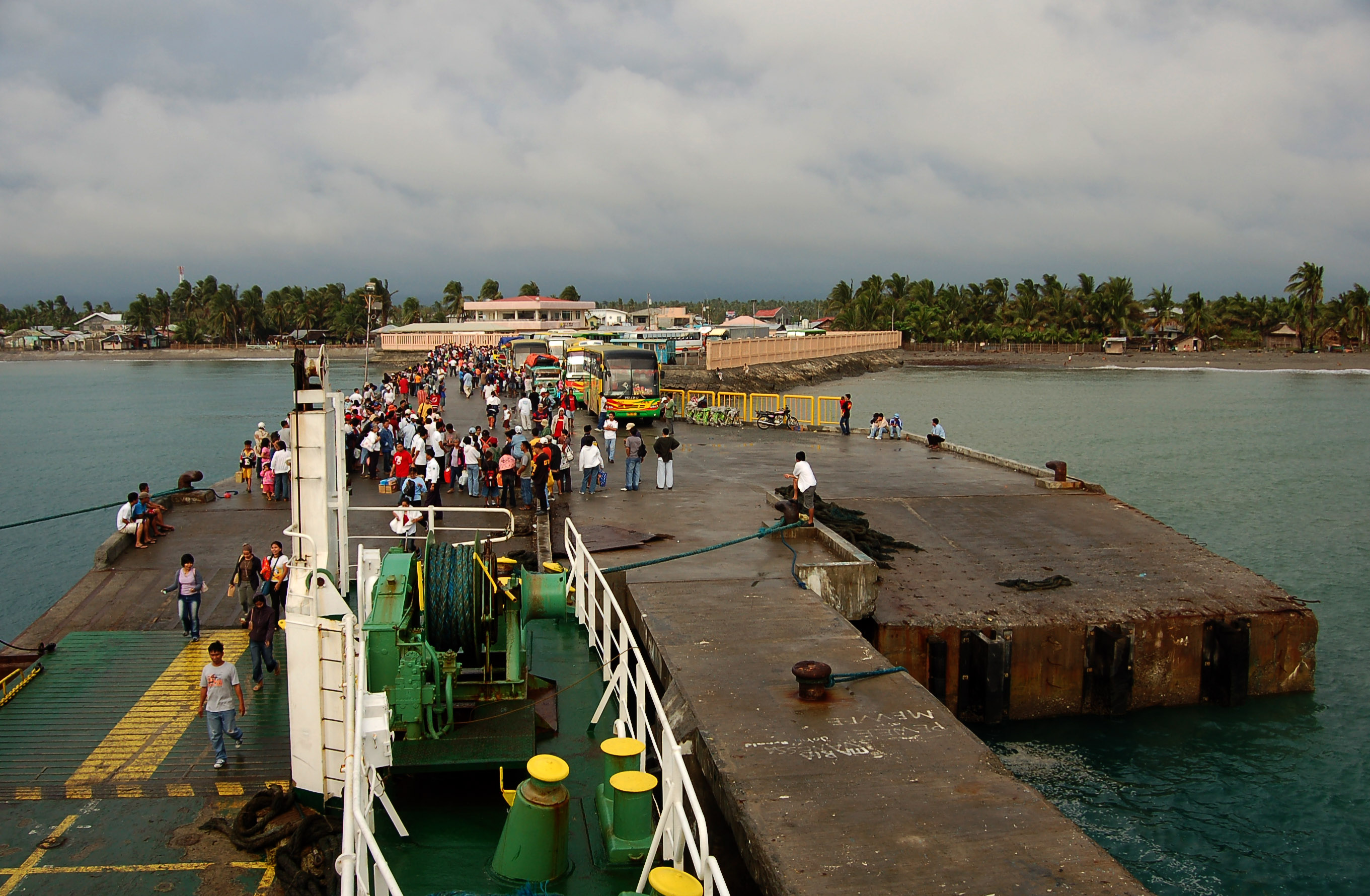
- Click on the map for a fullscreen view

Location
- Country: Philippines
- Location: Roxas, Oriental Mindoro
- Coordinates: 12°39′N 121°33′E
- UN/LOCODE: PHRXS

Details
- Operated by: Philippine Ports Authority
- Size: 7,270.00 square metres (78,253.6 sq ft)

The Port of Roxas, Oriental Mindoro (Filipino: Pantalan ng Roxas, Oriental Mindoro) or Dangay Port is the seaport in Roxas, Oriental Mindoro in the Philippines.

The seaport serves as a gateway to Mindanao and Visayas from Luzon with passengers being transported from the Dangay port to Caticlan. The primary products being handled at the port are rice, rice bran, fruits, vegetables, fish and home appliances.

The Dangay Port also has a passenger terminal building which is operated by Nautical Ports Management Services, Inc. which covers around 160 square metres (1,700 sq ft) of area.
