= Bansud =

Municipality in Oriental Mindoro, Philippines

- Municipality
- Municipality of Bansud
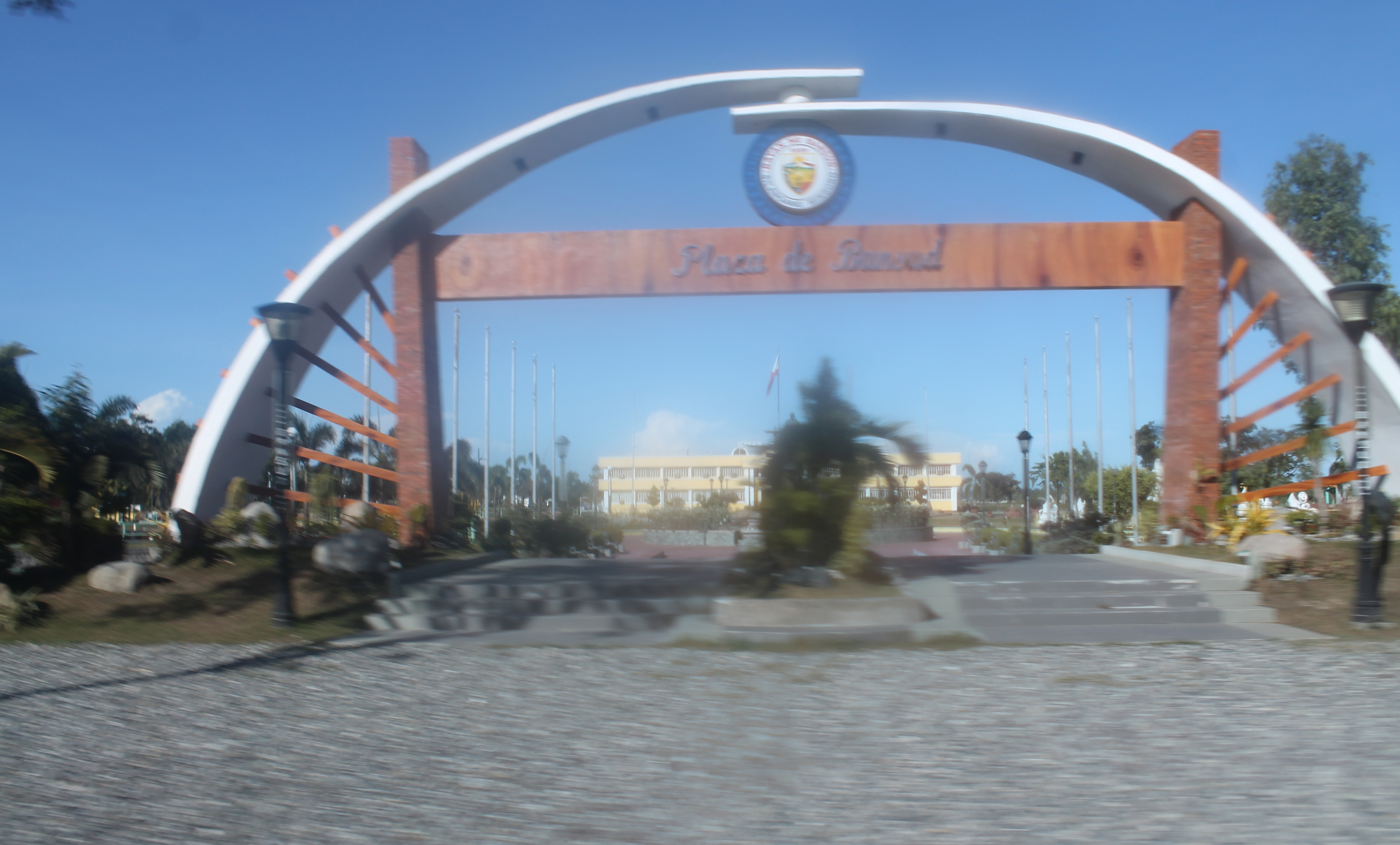
- The Plaza De Bansud at Brgy. Poblacion

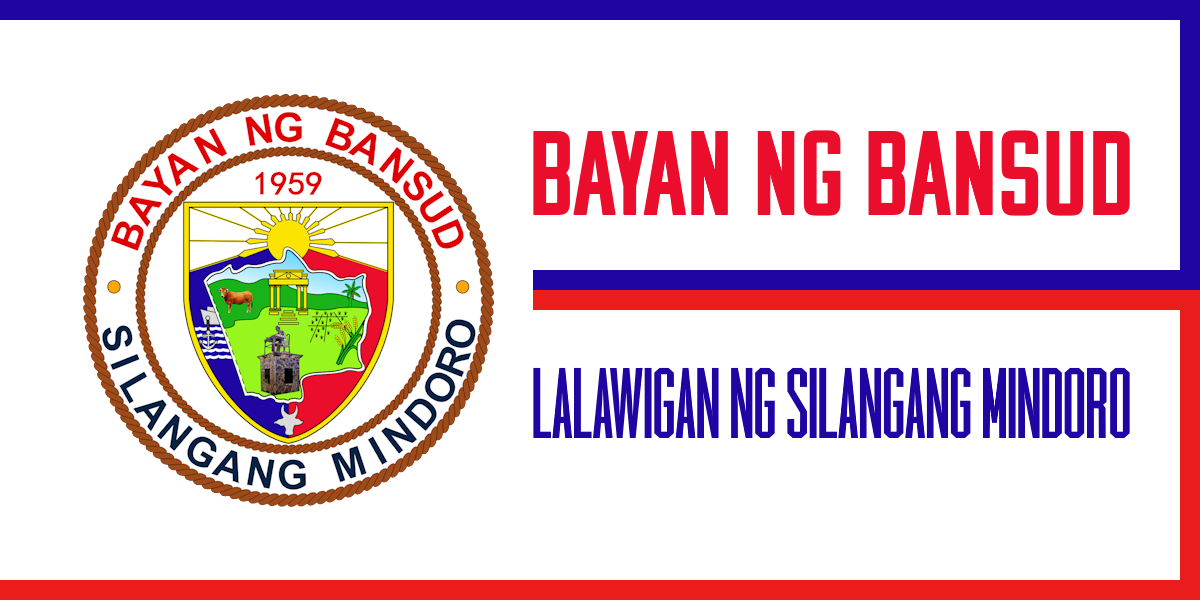
- Flag Seal

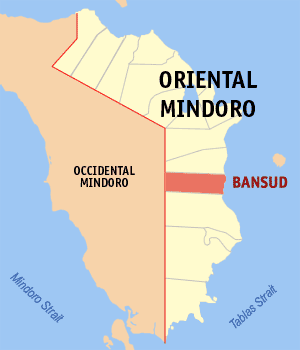
- Map of Oriental Mindoro with Bansud highlighted
- Interactive map of Bansud
- Location within the Philippines
- Coordinates: 12°51′34″N 121°27′24″E
- Country: Philippines
- Region: Mimaropa
- Province: Oriental Mindoro
- District: 2nd district
- Barangays: 13 (see Barangays)

Government
  - Type: Sangguniang Bayan
  - Mayor: Ronaldo M. Morada
  - Vice Mayor: Alma C. Mirano
  - Representative: Alfonso V. Umali Jr.
  - Electorate: 27,825 voters (2025)

Area
  - Total: 343.47 km^{2} (132.61 sq mi)
- Elevation: 21 m (69 ft)
- Highest elevation: 123 m (404 ft)
- Lowest elevation: 0 m (0 ft)

Population (2024 census)
  - Total: 44,396
  - Density: 129.26/km^{2} (334.77/sq mi)
  - Households: 10,003

Economy
  - Income class: 1st municipal income class
  - Poverty incidence: 20.63% (2023)
  - Revenue: ₱ 253.9 million (2024)
  - Assets: ₱ 654.3 million (2024)
  - Expenditure: ₱ 21.57 million (2024)
  - Liabilities: ₱ 116.5 million (2024)

Service provider
  - Electricity: Oriental Mindoro Electric Cooperative (ORMECO)
- Time zone: UTC+8 (PST)
- ZIP code: 5210
- PSGC: 1705202000
- IDD : area code: +63 (0)43
- Native languages: Romblomanon; Tagalog
- Website: www.bansud.gov.ph

Bansud, officially the Municipality of Bansud (Tagalog: Bayan ng Bansud), is a municipality in the province of Oriental Mindoro, Philippines. According to the 2024 census, it has a population of 44,396 people.

== Etymology ==
The name of the town is said to be derived from a legend. The legend says that long ago the Mangyans, the aborigines of the Mindoro settled in the lands near the mouth of Bansud River, which they called “Basud” which means Delta. The delta provided fertile soil for the people; hence they lived there peacefully and productively until the time that settlers from the province of Marinduque and Visayan Islands moved in. In many years that followed, the word “Basud” was eventually changed to Bansud. And the founder of Bansud is Reverend Leon Mampusti.

== Geography ==
Bansud is 90 kilometres (56 mi) from Calapan and 20 kilometres (12 mi) from Pinamalayan.

=== Barangays ===
Bansud is politically subdivided into 13 barangays. Each barangay consists of puroks and some have sitios.

- Alcadesma
- Bato
- Conrazon
- Malo
- Manihala
- Pag-asa
- Poblacion
- Proper Bansud
- Rosacara
- Salcedo
- Sumagui
- Proper Tiguisan
- Villa Pagasa

=== Climate ===
Climate data for Bansud, Oriental Mindoro
Month	Jan	Feb	Mar	Apr	May	Jun	Jul	Aug	Sep	Oct	Nov	Dec	Year
Mean daily maximum °C (°F)	26 (79)	28 (82)	29 (84)	31 (88)	31 (88)	30 (86)	29 (84)	29 (84)	29 (84)	29 (84)	28 (82)	27 (81)	29 (84)
Mean daily minimum °C (°F)	22 (72)	22 (72)	22 (72)	23 (73)	25 (77)	25 (77)	25 (77)	25 (77)	25 (77)	24 (75)	23 (73)	23 (73)	24 (75)
Average precipitation mm (inches)	115 (4.5)	66 (2.6)	55 (2.2)	39 (1.5)	164 (6.5)	282 (11.1)	326 (12.8)	317 (12.5)	318 (12.5)	192 (7.6)	119 (4.7)	173 (6.8)	2,166 (85.3)
Average rainy days	13.6	9.4	10.4	10.5	21.1	26.0	29.0	27.6	27.5	23.1	16.7	16.1	231
Source: Meteoblue

== Demographics ==
Population census of Bansud
Year	Pop.	±% p.a.
1960	10,935	—
1970	17,492	+4.80%
1975	20,095	+2.82%
1980	22,614	+2.39%
1990	26,225	+1.49%
1995	31,901	+3.74%
2000	35,032	+2.03%
2007	35,664	+0.25%
2010	38,341	+2.67%
2015	40,992	+1.28%
2020	42,671	+0.85%
2024	44,396	+0.96%
Source: Philippine Statistics Authority

== Economy ==
Poverty incidence of Bansud (%)

Source: Philippine Statistics Authority

== Education ==
The Bansud Schools District Office governs all educational institutions within the municipality. It oversees the management and operations of all private and public, from primary to secondary schools.

=== Primary and elementary schools ===
- Apnagan Elementary School
- Bansud Central School
- Bansud Christian Academy
- Bato Elementary School
- Beulah's Kiddie Kollege
- Catmon Elementary School
- Clarion Call Learning Center
- Conrazon Elementary School
- Dr. Angel S. Rodriguez Memorial Elementary School
- Dyangdang Elementary School
- Francisco M. Morales-Malaya Elementary School
- Hillside View Adventist Elementary School
- Labo Elementary School
- Malaya Adventist Elementary School
- Malu Elementary School
- Manacsi Elementary School
- Manihala Elementary School
- Metamorphosis Child Development & Care Center
- Pag-Asa Elementary School
- Policarpio Hernandez Memorial Elementary School
- Proper Bansud Elementary School
- Rosacara Elementary School
- Salcedo Elementary School
- Sto. Niño Elementary School
- Tiguisan Elementary School
- Villapagasa Elementary School

=== Secondary schools ===
- Alcadesma National High School
- Apnagan High School
- Bansud Institute
- Bansud National High School - Regional Science High School
- Felimon M. Salcedo Sr. Memorial National High School
- Conrazon High School
- Malo High School
- Pag-asa National High School
- Villapagasa National High School

=== Higher educational institution ===
- Jesus is Lord Colleges Foundation
