= Pinamalayan =

Municipality in Oriental Mindoro, Philippines

- Municipality
- Municipality of Pinamalayan
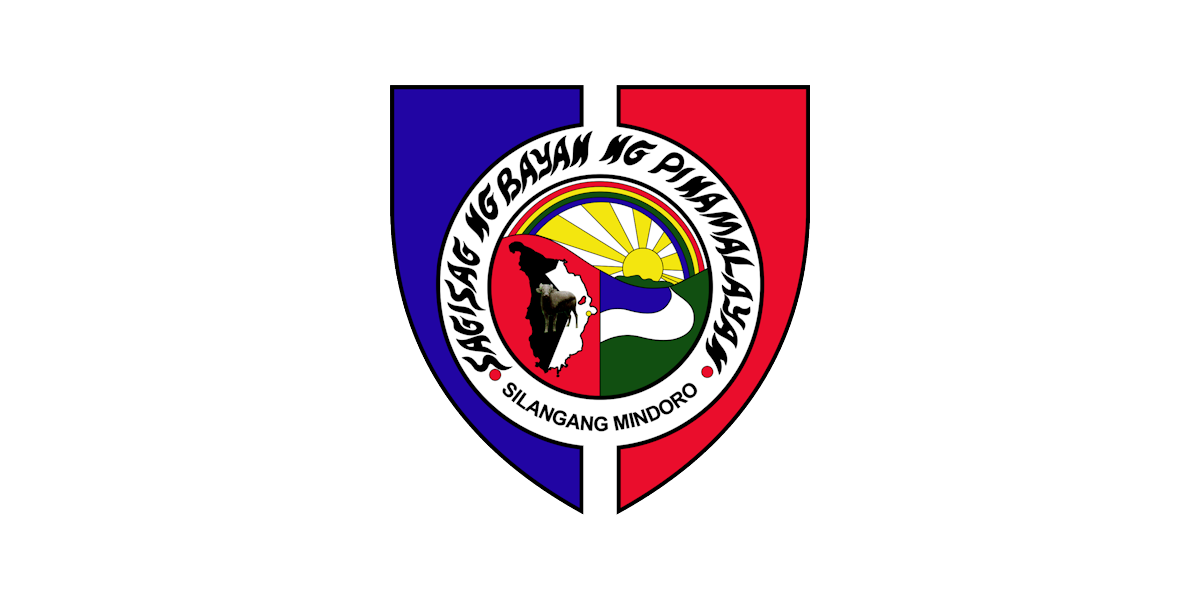
- Flag Seal
- Nickname: Paraiso ng Bahaghari · Rainbow City
- Map of Oriental Mindoro with Pinamalayan highlighted
- Interactive map of Pinamalayan
- Location within the Philippines
- Coordinates: 13°02′11″N 121°29′20″E
- Country: Philippines
- Region: Mimaropa
- Province: Oriental Mindoro
- District: 2nd district
- Founded: 1908
- Barangays: 37 (see Barangays)

Government
  - Type: Sangguniang Bayan
  - Mayor: Rodolfo M. Magsino
  - Vice Mayor: Aristeo A. Baldos Jr.
  - Representative: Alfonso V. Umali Jr.
  - Electorate: 51,177 voters (2025)

Area
  - Total: 282.26 km^{2} (108.98 sq mi)
- Elevation: 25 m (82 ft)
- Highest elevation: 386 m (1,266 ft)
- Lowest elevation: 0 m (0 ft)

Population (2024 census)
  - Total: 90,420
  - Density: 320.3/km^{2} (829.7/sq mi)
  - Households: 21,322
- Demonym: Pinamaleño/a · Pinamalayeño/a

Economy
  - Income class: 1st municipal income class
  - Poverty incidence: 15.9% (2023)
  - Revenue: ₱ 396 million (2024)
  - Assets: ₱ 1,088 million (2024)
  - Expenditure: ₱ 459.2 million (2024)
  - Liabilities: ₱ 367.8 million (2024)

Service provider
  - Electricity: Oriental Mindoro Electric Cooperative (ORMECO)
- Time zone: UTC+8 (PST)
- ZIP code: 5208
- PSGC: 1705209000
- IDD : area code: +63 (0)43
- Native languages: Tawbuid; Tagalog
- Website: www.pinamalayan.gov.ph

Pinamalayan, officially the Municipality of Pinamalayan (Tagalog: Bayan ng Pinamalayan), is a municipality in the province of Oriental Mindoro, Philippines. According to the 2024 census, it has a population of 90,420 people.

== Etymology ==
The town of Pinamalayan is close to the shore at the mouth of the river of the same name. The town's name was said to be taken from the word “Ipinamalay na” which means to have been made aware of, or had shown the way or it has been made known [to us]. According to an old story, the early settlers of this town came from Marinduque. While they were on their way to Mindoro in their big bancas (boats), they encountered turbulent weather and lost their way. They prayed to the God Almighty for deliverance and guidance, whereupon, the weather cleared and a rainbow appeared on the horizon which they used as a guide towards safety and to a place where they discovered abundant resources and endless promises. The crew shouted “Ipinamalay na!” (it was made known).

They followed the direction of the rainbow believing that at its end lies a pot of gold and good fortune. They finally landed at what is now Barangay Lumambayan and established the first settlement which they named Pinamalayan. They found good fortune in the new land which brought them prosperity because of the good soil and abundant resources.

Some other sources attribute the name Pinamalayan simply to the fact that the area was once a vast area planted to rice, hence the name “pinagpalayan” or “Pinamalayan”. Since then the place grew and became a town. However, during the entire 18th century, Pinamalayan was one of the coastal areas frequently attacked by Moro Pirates. People were decimated and many fled to the interior for safety. In spite of all these, the town site remained in that place until 1916 when it was transferred by the Americans to its present site - evident by the city grid type of street planning in there.

== History ==
The town of Pinamalayan is one of the oldest in the province of Oriental Mindoro. Its territory once went as far as the old settlements of Sumagui and Anilao which are now part of the towns Bansud and Bongabong respectively. The Town of Pinamalayan was also a former part of Pola until it got its permanent township status in the early years of American Colonization while Gloria was separated from Pinamalayan in 1964.

=== Spanish period ===
The history of the town has its ancient beginning antedating far back with the advent of the Marinduque settlers in the early part of the 18th century who landed on the shores of the old settlement at Lumang-bayan. The first village was implanted there by the newcomers pushing back the pagans (Mangyan) to the interior. In the course of time and subjected by the ravages of Moro piracy, the natives had to fight back the buccaneers as well as the tulisanes (bandits) at the end of the 19th century. The old Lumang-bayan was the town up to its transfer to the present site on or about 1914. The Recollect Order first established a part of the second ecclesiastic district of Naujan and extend as far as Bongabon, assigning St. Agustine as its titular (Patron Saint).

The pattern of this town's territorial expansion dated back during the Spanish time when the villagers of Pinamalayan, Pola, Sumagui, Anilao and Bongabon belonged to one ministry district. That pattern was closely adhered to in the later part of the Spanish regime from 1888 to 1890. It was organized as a permanent settlement with Juan Morente, Sr. as gobernadorcillo and succeeded by his son, Juan Morente, Jr., as Captain (Mayor) in 1890–1894. When the revolution broke out against Spain, Pinamalayan took up arms and underwent some government changes under the provisional Malolos government headed by Juan Medina in 1898. When the Spaniards surrendered, Morente Jr. became governor of the province of Mindoro while Cornelio Nable was appointed as the municipal president.

=== American period ===
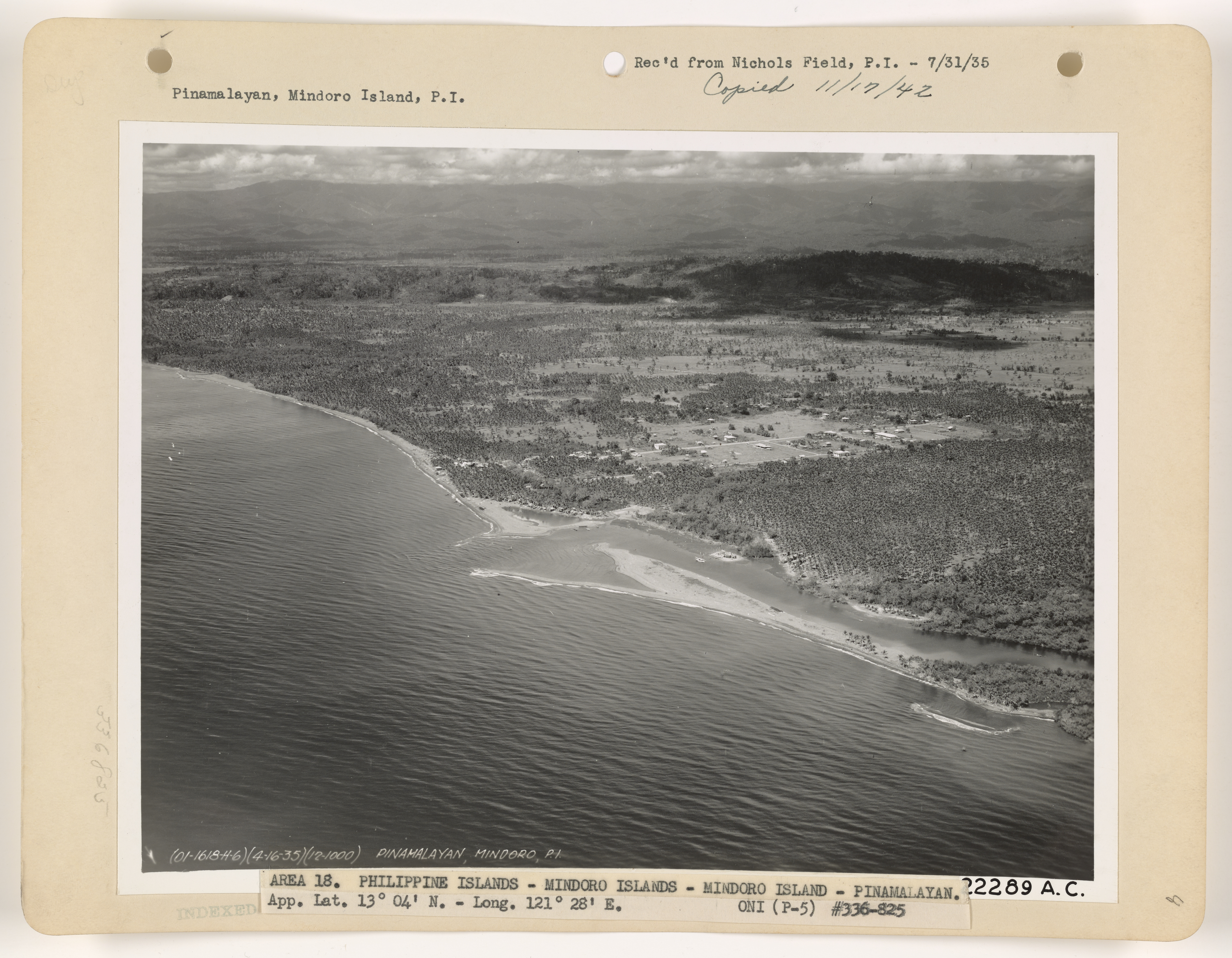
Aerial view of Pinamalayan, 1935

In the Filipino-American War, the American forces took possession of the town, placed it under a military regime from 1901 to 1902; appointed Cornelio Nable as its first President under the new civil government. Reorganized on April 28, 1904, under Act No. 1135 of the Philippine Commission, the municipalities of Bongabon and Pola were annexed to Pinamalayan as barrios. In the following year, on January 4, 1905, under Act No. 1280, the municipality of Pola was annexed to Pinamalayan as a barrio. In 1914, Pinamalayan was organized as a regular municipality. Since then, a new town site has been proposed, selected and surveyed for expansion. This new town site was planned by Governor Juan Morente, Jr. and Mr. Thomas I. Weeks. The American planners made sure that this new town will be laid out properly according to a planning system of wide symmetrical vertical and horizontal roads with proper drainage facilities. A big plaza was further constructed in front of the municipal

Martsa Magandang Pinamalayan
This is the official march of Pinamalayan, October 18, 1993
(Duration: 2 minute, 45 seconds)

building. Pinamalayan still stands as a model in town planning to all the municipalities in Oriental Mindoro.

In 1914 to 1916, during these years under review, the national high way to Pinamalayan has also been proposed and completed in 1931.

In January 1912, Pola was separated from Pinamalayan as township and in 1920, Bongabon was separated from Pinamalayan as a municipal district under Act No. 2824 of March 15, 1919. Agriculture and business developments gradually increased with opening of roads. More people immigrated since then - settlement on public [and alienable] land has hastened, homesteading increased resulting to wider areas of uncultivated lands being utilized for agricultural production.

=== World War II and Japanese occupation period ===
On or about January 20, 1942, the Japanese Army from Calapan occupied the town and appointed Carlos Aguilocho and M. Medina as occupation Mayors. On or about January 15, 1945, the American Army from San Jose landed at Pinamalayan and liberated it from the enemy. Substantial progress has been made in the rehabilitation of the town since 1946. Municipal roads were repaired and extended, three big bridges were constructed (Balete, Nabuslot, and Lumambayan), a water system and a new market were constructed, a puericulture center and the beautification of the town plaza were undertaken. In 1948, Quinabigan was declared a national sub-port. The town is composed of six big barrios, namely; Lumang-bayan, Quinabigan, Nabuslot, Panggulayan, Maligaya, and Balete.

=== Contemporary ===
In the early 1960s, certain barrios south of Pinamalayan associated themselves and successfully petitioned to become an entirely new town resulting in the creation of Municipality of Gloria.

==== Typhoon Melor ====
On December 15, 2015, Pinamalayan is hit by Typhoon Nona (Melor), which made its fifth landfall. The town was badly damaged by the typhoon, with around 15,000 homes devastated, about 83% of the 18,000 houses destroyed in Oriental Mindoro, and approximately 24,000 families evacuated.

== Geography ==
The town of Ipinamalay (now Pinamalayan) is close to the shore on the river of the same name about 2-3/4 miles- south-westward of Bugot Point. The Pinamalayan River whose source originates from the mountains north of the town empties at the mouth of the old Lumang-Bayan River. Stretching from Mount Dumali in the north-eastern part of the island high and prominent, the coastal trends southward with a succession of sweeping curves towards Pinamalayan Bay to Duyagan Point.

The town is bounded on the north by Babahurin Hill and extends towards the north-west which meets the town of Pola. Towards the south and north, the town lies on an extensive plain and is low and flat towards the south and up to the boundary with (and past) Gloria. About 90% of its area is located on its level plain which extends into the interior. It is intersected by one river, the Lumangbayan while the Pula River serves as boundary with Socorro - both aren't navigable. The town is exposed to the north-east monsoon, but with the mountain facing north, it is safe from that direction.

Pinamalayan is 70 kilometres (43 mi) from Calapan.

=== Barangays ===
Map showing administrative divisions of Pinamalayan, Oriental Mindoro

Pinamalayan is politically subdivided into 37 Barangays. Each barangay consists of puroks and some have sitios.

- Anoling
- Bacungan
- Bangbang
- Banilad
- Buli
- Cacawan
- Calingag
- Del Razon
- Guinhawa
- Inclanay
- Lumambayan
- Malaya
- Maliangcog
- Maningcol
- Marayos
- Marfrancisco
- Nabuslot
- Pagalagala
- Palayan
- Pambisan Malaki
- Pambisan Munti
- Panggulayan
- Papandayan
- Pili
- Quinabigan
- Ranzo
- Rosario
- Sabang
- Sta. Isabel
- Sta. Maria
- Sta. Rita
- Sto. Nino
- Wawa
- Zone I
- Zone II
- Zone III
- Zone IV

=== Climate ===
Climate data for Pinamalayan, Oriental Mindoro
Month	Jan	Feb	Mar	Apr	May	Jun	Jul	Aug	Sep	Oct	Nov	Dec	Year
Mean daily maximum °C (°F)	26 (79)	28 (82)	29 (84)	31 (88)	31 (88)	30 (86)	29 (84)	29 (84)	29 (84)	29 (84)	28 (82)	27 (81)	29 (84)
Mean daily minimum °C (°F)	22 (72)	22 (72)	22 (72)	23 (73)	25 (77)	25 (77)	25 (77)	25 (77)	25 (77)	24 (75)	23 (73)	23 (73)	24 (75)
Average precipitation mm (inches)	115 (4.5)	66 (2.6)	55 (2.2)	39 (1.5)	164 (6.5)	282 (11.1)	326 (12.8)	317 (12.5)	318 (12.5)	192 (7.6)	119 (4.7)	173 (6.8)	2,166 (85.3)
Average rainy days	13.6	9.4	10.4	10.5	21.1	26.0	29.0	27.6	27.5	23.1	16.7	16.1	231
Source: Meteoblue

== Demographics ==
Population census of Pinamalayan
Year	Pop.	±% p.a.
1903	3,200	—
1918	10,497	+8.24%
1939	16,086	+2.05%
1948	21,756	+3.41%
1960	39,240	+5.04%
1970	33,936	−1.44%
1975	42,701	+4.72%
1980	48,431	+2.55%
1990	58,777	+1.96%
1995	65,903	+2.17%
2000	72,951	+2.20%
2007	77,119	+0.77%
2010	81,666	+2.11%
2015	86,172	+1.03%
2020	90,383	+1.01%
2024	90,420	+0.01%
Source: Philippine Statistics Authority

The town's population is mostly Mangyan and Tagalog.

== Economy ==
Poverty incidence of Pinamalayan (%)

Source: Philippine Statistics Authority

Pinamalayan is one of the ranking producers of coconuts in the Philippines. Its fertile plains are also devoted to yearly rice production making it a source of supply for Marinduque, Tablas, and neighboring localities. The municipality is one of the premier producers of bananas, a variety of forest products are gathered; a diversification of crops, vegetables and fruit trees are being accomplished.

It accounts for a variety of fish products from the sea; some fish ponds are now being developed; ranked second to none in the manufacture of wooden shoes, a distributing center of retail and wholesale trade for Sibale and Bongabon, it has a busy market in the poblacion and a barrio market at Nabuslot. It is not only a coconut region, but it is also a retail and wholesale trade center.

Pinamalayan's semi-circular waterfront affords anchorage for vessels of inter-island type and is visited weekly by steamers direct from Manila via Marinduque. It also affords an anchorage for ocean-going vessels in the sub-port of Quinabigan where copra is shipped every three months. It stands mid-way in the national highway to Bongabon and to Calapan. The Borbon and Halcon buses make this town a terminal and transport system. The town has 2 light houses, one at Punta Dumali and the other in the town proper.

== Heritage ==
Pinamalayan has a number of ancestral houses which are now mostly used for business purposes.

=== San Agustin Ancestral House ===
Located along Burgos St. corner Mabini St., San Agustin Ancestral House was built in 1922. Wide plank hardwood flooring is maintained in the second floor which now houses an internet café.

== List of Cultural Properties in Pinamalayan ==
Cultural Property wmph identifier (Note: wmph is an internal identifier used by Wikimedia Philippines to identify the monument. This is not an official identifier, and only shown temporarily in the templates until the government creates an updated complete list.)	Site name	Description	Province	City or municipality	Address	Coordinates	Image
	San Agustin Ancestral House	1922	Oriental Mindoro	Pinamalayan, Oriental Mindoro	Burgos (Jaena) cor. Mabini St.	13°02′09″N 121°29′13″E	Upload file
	Evora House	1952	Oriental Mindoro	Pinamalayan, Oriental Mindoro	Burgos (Jaena)	13°02′10″N 121°29′14″E	Upload file
	Jacob House	1964	Oriental Mindoro	Pinamalayan, Oriental Mindoro	Burgos (Jaena)	13°02′11″N 121°29′14″E	Upload file
	Celestino Magol House	pre-1940	Oriental Mindoro	Pinamalayan, Oriental Mindoro	Juan Luna St.	13°02′09″N 121°29′15″E	Upload file
	Antonio Morente House	unknown date of construction	Oriental Mindoro	Pinamalayan, Oriental Mindoro	Bonifacio St. cor. Mabini St.	13°02′06″N 121°29′17″E	Upload file
	Gusali Mendoza Torres	unknown date of construction	Oriental Mindoro	Pinamalayan, Oriental Mindoro	Morente (Malvar) St. cor. Mabini St.	13°02′02″N 121°29′23″E	Upload file
	Natividad De Joya-Morente Ancestral House	1935	Oriental Mindoro	Pinamalayan, Oriental Mindoro	Morente (Malvar) St.	13°02′05″N 121°29′24″E	Upload file
	Pinamalayan Vocational School	1960s	Oriental Mindoro	Pinamalayan, Oriental Mindoro	Morente (Malvar) St.	13°02′01″N 121°29′18″E	Upload file
	Aling Piling Ancestral House	unknown date of construction	Oriental Mindoro	Pinamalayan, Oriental Mindoro	Morente (Malvar) St.	13°01′59″N 121°29′21″E	Upload file
	Dr. Gonzales House	1950	Oriental Mindoro	Pinamalayan, Oriental Mindoro	Morente (Malvar) St. cor. Madrid St.	13°01′58″N 121°29′21″E	Upload file

== Health Care ==
Pinamalayan is home to several Infirmary and Level I Hospitals accredited by the Department of Health. As of the latest DOH Facility Registry, there are 44 health care facilities in the municipality as follows:

- Level I - two hospitals
  - Oriental Mindoro Central District Hospital
  - Pinamalayan Doctors' Hospital
- Infirmary - two health facilities
  - Delos Reyes Medical Clinic
  - St. Paul General Hospital
- Rural Health Unit - one unit
  - Pinamalayan Rural Health Unit
- Birthing Home - one facility
  - Vertucio Medical Clinic
- General Clinic and Laboratory - one facility
  - Barretto Medical and Diagnostic Center
- Barangay Health Station - thirty-seven (37) facilities

=== LEVEL I HOSPITALS ===
LEVEL I Hospitals are general hospitals that offer out-patient, in-patient, and emergency services as well as the following functions accredited by the Department of Health: operating room, recovery room, labor and delivery facilities, isolation units, clinical laboratory, imaging facility, and a pharmacy.

==== ORIENTAL MINDORO CENTRAL DISTRICT HOSPITAL (OMCDH) ====
Previously known as Pinamalayan Community Hospital, is a government-owned hospital that aims to provide free health care services for the constituents of the municipality. It is one of the two Level I government hospitals in the second district of Oriental Mindoro, the other one being Oriental Mindoro Southern District Hospital. It is located at Strong Republic Nautical High Way, Brgy. Papandayan, Pinamalayan, Oriental Mindoro.

==== PINAMALAYAN DOCTORS' HOSPITAL (PDH) ====
Located at the heart of Pinamalayan is Pinamalayan Doctors' Hospital, more known to the locals as Ospital ni Dr. Ng. It is a 30-bed capacity private hospital and the only DOH accredited private Level I Hospital in the second district of Oriental Mindoro. It offers general medical services such as General Medicine, Internal Medicine (Adult Diseases), General Pediatrics, General Surgery, and Obstetrics and Gynecology. Specialized services such as ENT-Head and Neck Surgery, Cardiology, Endocrinology, Gastroenterology, Nephrology, Orthopedic Surgery, and Laparoscopic Surgery are also available.

Ancillary services include x-ray, ultrasound, 2D-Echo, clinical laboratory, and hospital pharmacy. The Emergency Room is open 24 hours a day, seven days a week.

PDH is located at Francisco St., Brgy Marfrancisco, Pinamalayan, Oriental Mindoro.

=== INFIRMARY FACILITIES ===
Infirmary facilities are facilities approved by the Department of Health to render minimal to intermediate care and management in the following areas: Medicine, Pediatrics, Non-surgical Obstetrics and Gynecology, Minor Surgery.

==== DELOS REYES MEDICAL CLINIC ====
One of the earliest medical facilities in the municipality, Delos Reyes Medical Clinic is located at Aguinaldo St., Pinamalayan, Oriental Mindoro.

==== ST. PAUL GENERAL HOSPITAL ====
Known as a children's hospital, St. Paul General Hospital now caters to adult patients as well. Located at Quezon St., Brgy Zone III, Pinamalayan, Oriental Mindoro.

=== RURAL HEALTH UNIT (RHU) ===
Pinamalayan Rural Health Unit is also known as the Municipal Health Office of Pinamalayan. It is Headed by Dr. Niña Kristinne L. Punzalan (Municipal Health Officer) with Dr. Marc Jayson Castro (Rural Health Physician), and Dr. Kathrin Alano Castro (Medical Officer III). They, along with the rest of the Municipal Health Office Staff, conduct regular public health programs and services to the constituents of Pinamalayan. Their efforts have permitted them to bring health care services to the far-flung areas of the municipality and the underserved communities.

== Education ==
There are two schools district offices which govern all educational institutions within the municipality. They oversee the management and operations of all private and public, from primary to secondary schools.

These are the Pinamalayan East Schools District, and Pinamalayan West Schools District.

=== Pinamalayan East District ===
==== Public & Private Elementary ====
- Abada College
- Banilad Elementary School
- Buli Elementary School
- Cacawan Elementary School
- Del Razon Elementary School
- Doña Asuncion Reyes Memorial Elementary School
- EMA EMITS College Philippines Inc.
- Frayre's Nursery & Kinder School
- Juan Morente, Sr. Memorial Pilot School
- Lumambayan Elementary School
- Malaya Elementary School
- Maria Loreto Integrated School Foundation, Inc.
- Natividad M. de Joya Memorial Elementary School
- Papandayan Elementary School
- Pili Elementary School
- Pinamalayan Adventist Elementary School
- Quinabigan Elementary School
- Ranzo Elementary School
- Rosario Elementary School
- Sta. Isabel Elementary School
- Upper Bongol Elementary School
- Wawa Elementary School

==== Public & Private Secondary ====
- Abada College
- Buli High School
- Cacawan High School
- Dr. Aristeo Baldos Sr. - Papandayan High School
- EMA EMITS College Philippines Inc.
- Immaculate Heart of Mary Academy Inc.
- Institute of Business Science and Medical Arts
- Pili National High School
- Pinamalayan Maritime Foundation and Technological College, Inc.
- Pinamalayan School of Science and Technology, Inc.
- Quinabigan National High School
- Ranzo National High School

=== Pinamalayan West District ===
==== Public & Private Elementary ====
- Anoling Elementary School
- Bacungan Elementary School
- Bangbang Elementary School
- Calingag Elementary School
- Inclanay Elementary School
- Jesus is Lord Colleges Foundation Inc.
- Miguel Ansaldo Sr. Memorial Elementary School
- Maliangcog Elementary School
- Maningcol Elementary School
- Marayos Elementary School
- Metamorphosis Child Development & Care Center
- Nabuslot Central School
- Pagalagala Elementary School
- Pambisan Munti Elementary School
- Panggulayan Elementary School
- Pinamalayan Adventist Elementary School Inc.
- Sabang Elementary School
- Safa Elementary School
- Sta. Rita Elementary School

==== Public & Private Secondary ====
- Anoling High School
- Divine Word College of Calapan - Pinamalayan Campus
- Francisco "Kiko" Manlises - Calingag High School
- Gerardo Fanoga, Sr. - Pambisan Munti High School
- Nabuslot National High School
- Pambisan National High School
- Sabang High School
- Southwestern Institute of Business and Technology, Inc.

=== Higher Educational Institutions (HEIs) ===
- Abada College
- EMA-EMITS Colleges Philippines
- Institute of Business Science & Medical Arts
- Pinamalayan Maritime Foundation & Technological College
- Pinamalayan School of Sciences & Technology
- Southwestern Institute of Business & Technology
