= Mansalay =

Municipality in Oriental Mindoro, Philippines

- Municipality
- Municipality of Mansalay
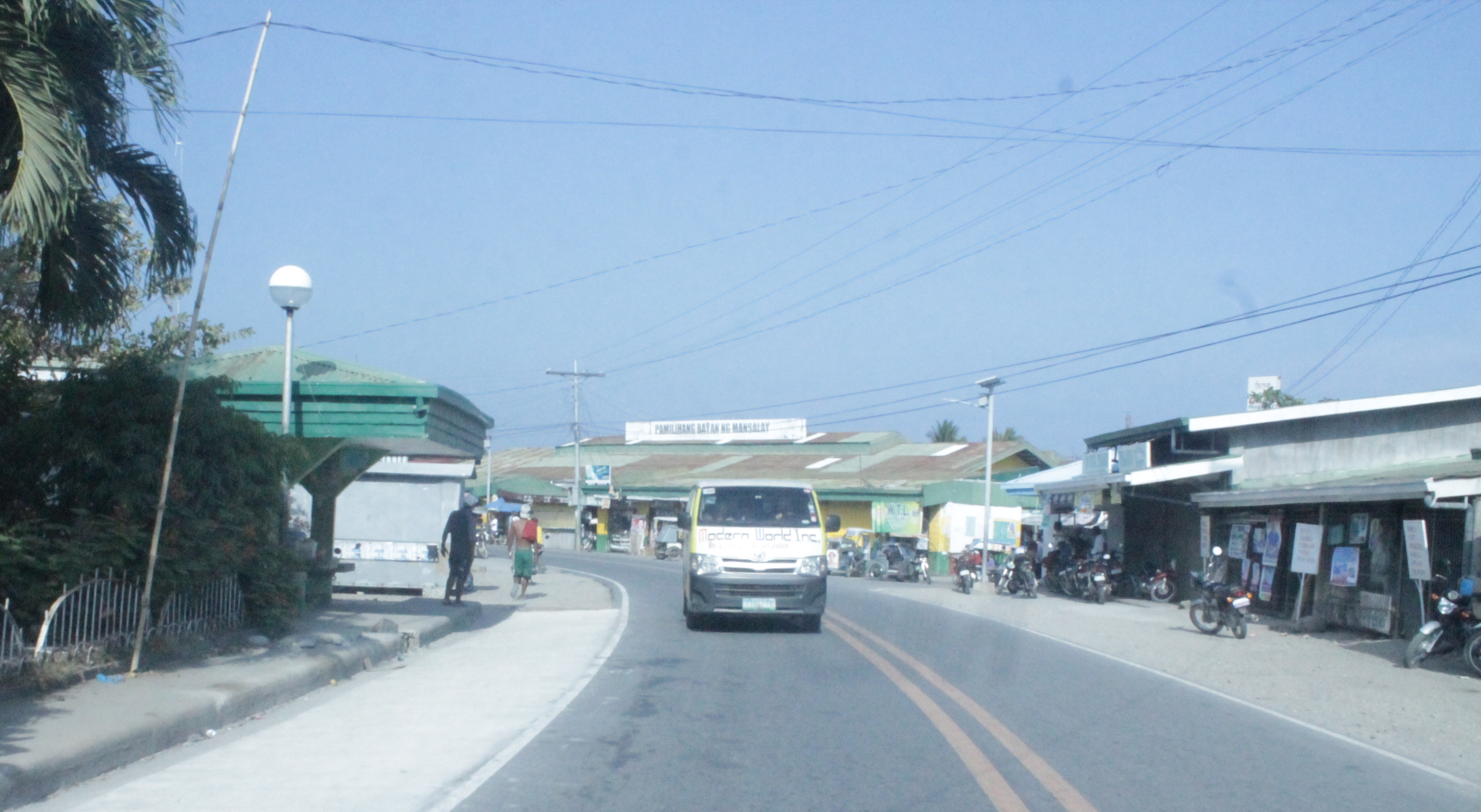
- Downtown area

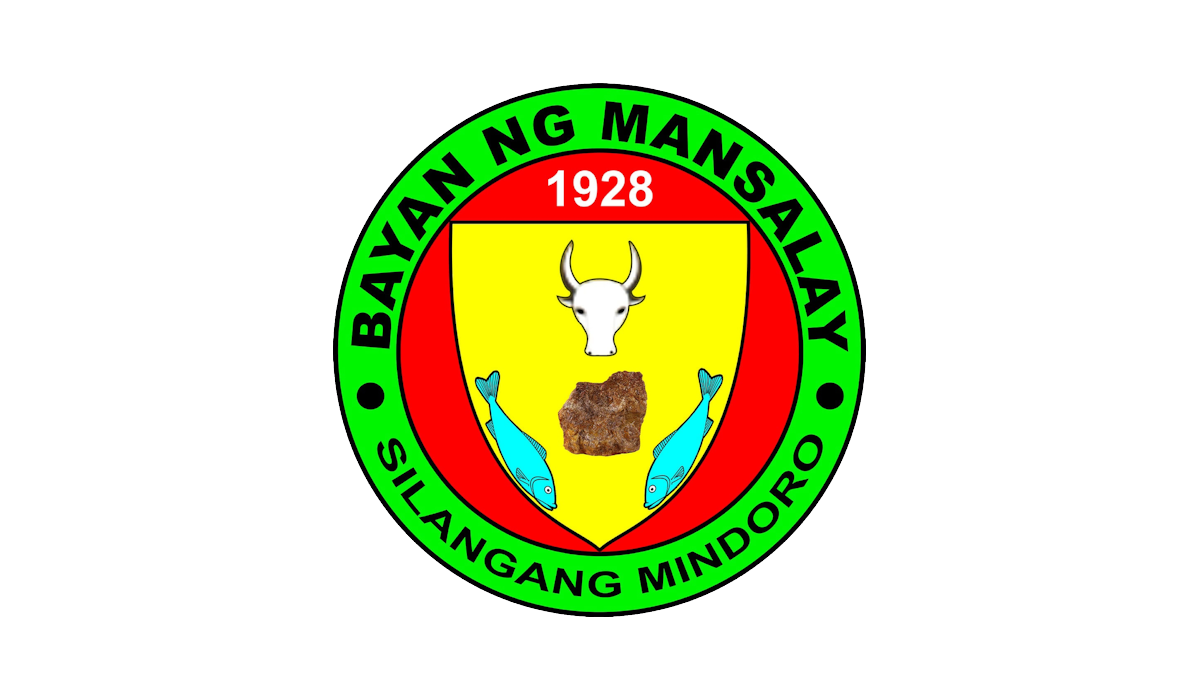
- Flag
- Nickname: Ammonite Capital of the Philippines
- Map of Oriental Mindoro with Mansalay highlighted
- Interactive map of Mansalay
- Location within the Philippines
- Coordinates: 12°31′14″N 121°26′19″E
- Country: Philippines
- Region: Mimaropa
- Province: Oriental Mindoro
- District: 2nd district
- Barangays: 17 (see Barangays)

Government
  - Type: Sangguniang Bayan
  - Mayor: Ferdinand M. Maliwanag
  - Vice Mayor: Shernan Fajutnao Gamol
  - Representative: Alfonso V. Umali Jr.
  - Electorate: 33,758 voters (2025)

Area
  - Total: 446.62 km^{2} (172.44 sq mi)
- Elevation: 70 m (230 ft)
- Highest elevation: 473 m (1,552 ft)
- Lowest elevation: 0 m (0 ft)

Population (2024 census)
  - Total: 60,597
  - Density: 135.68/km^{2} (351.41/sq mi)
  - Households: 13,332
- Demonym: Mansaleño/a

Economy
  - Income class: 1st municipal income class
  - Poverty incidence: 42.6% (2023)
  - Revenue: ₱ 317.4 million (2024)
  - Assets: ₱ 1,405 million (2024)
  - Expenditure: ₱ 307.9 million (2024)
  - Liabilities: ₱ 688.1 million (2024)

Service provider
  - Electricity: Oriental Mindoro Electric Cooperative (ORMECO)
- Time zone: UTC+8 (PST)
- ZIP code: 5213
- PSGC: 1705207000
- IDD : area code: +63 (0)43
- Native languages: Buhid; Hanunó'o; Ratagnon; Romblomanon; Tagalog

Mansalay, officially the Municipality of Mansalay (Tagalog: Bayan ng Mansalay), is a municipality in the province of Oriental Mindoro, Philippines. According to the 2024 census, it has a population of 60,597 people.

Santa Catalina is the town's patron saint.

== Etymology ==
Mansalay is thought to have originated from a conversation between the indigenous datu of Mansalay at the time, Abucay, and Spanish conquistadores. When Spanish conquistadors arrived at present-day Mansalay, they inquired the datu of Mansalay, Abucay, about the name of the area. To which, Datu Abucay responded with the phrase: "Man may malay" in the indigenous language which meant "I don't know." Indicating the failure of Datu Abucay to understand the inquiry of the Spanish conquistadors. Subsequently, the Spanish conquistadors thought that Abucay gave the real name of the area in spite of the clear language barrier. Henceforth, Spanish conquistadors recorded the area's name as Mansalay.

== History ==
Prior to the Spanish arrival, and eventual colonisation in the Philippines, Mansalay was inhabited by migrants from nearby islands in the Philippine archipelago such as Palawan and Panay.

During the Spanish colonisation of the Philippines, Mansalay was under the jurisdiction of the government of Mangarin, Mindoro. (present-day San Jose, Occidental Mindoro.)

In the year of 1901, during the Philippine-American War, Mansalay was occupied by American forces.

On 24 July 1929, Mansalay was made its own municipality by a bill authored by Mariano Leuterio, representative at the time for Mindoro. Teotimo P. Cusi became the first Municipal-President.

During the later-Interwar years, Mansalay attracted migrants from provinces in Central Luzon, Batangas, Romblon, and Capiz.

On 16 December 1944, Mansalay was liberated by American troops from the Japanese occupation forces in the Battle of Mindoro.

The town also has a wide ammonite formation area discovered in the 1940s. Since then, thousands of ammonite fossils have been discovered. Due to the complexity and vastness of the collection found in the area, the town has been called the Ammonite Capital of the Philippines. Various local and international scientific institutions have conducted research on the ammonite formations of Mansalay. Scholars have argued that due to the natural significance of the area to Southeast Asian pre-history, the site has a big chance of being declared as a UNESCO World Heritage Site or a UNESCO Geopark Reserve.

== Geography ==
Mansalay is in the southern part of the province and is 144 kilometres (89 mi) from Calapan.

The municipal hall is located on the upper land of Mansalay Town proper, in front of a Medical Care Hospital. Nearby is the church and the only Catholic School, Mansalay Catholic High School.

=== Barangays ===
Map showing administrative divisions of Mansalay, Oriental Mindoro

Mansalay is politically subdivided into 17 barangays. Each barangay consists of puroks and some have sitios.

In 1957, the sitios of Santa Brigida, Santa Maria, Roma, Budburan, and Mahabangsapa were constituted into barrios.

- B. Del Mundo
- Balugo
- Bonbon
- Budburan
- Cabalwa
- Don Pedro
- Maliwanag
- Manaul
- Panaytayan
- Poblacion
- Roma
- Santa Maria
- Santa Teresita
- Sta. Brigida
- Villa Celestial
- Wasig
- Waygan

=== Climate ===
Climate data for Mansalay, Oriental Mindoro
Month	Jan	Feb	Mar	Apr	May	Jun	Jul	Aug	Sep	Oct	Nov	Dec	Year
Mean daily maximum °C (°F)	28 (82)	29 (84)	30 (86)	31 (88)	31 (88)	30 (86)	29 (84)	29 (84)	29 (84)	29 (84)	29 (84)	28 (82)	29 (85)
Mean daily minimum °C (°F)	21 (70)	21 (70)	22 (72)	23 (73)	25 (77)	25 (77)	25 (77)	25 (77)	25 (77)	24 (75)	23 (73)	22 (72)	23 (74)
Average precipitation mm (inches)	31 (1.2)	20 (0.8)	25 (1.0)	39 (1.5)	152 (6.0)	269 (10.6)	314 (12.4)	285 (11.2)	303 (11.9)	208 (8.2)	95 (3.7)	70 (2.8)	1,811 (71.3)
Average rainy days	9.5	7.1	9.0	11.3	21.0	25.7	28.1	26.5	27.3	24.6	16.5	12.1	218.7
Source: Meteoblue

== Demographics ==
Population census of Mansalay
Year	Pop.	±% p.a.
1939	7,003	—
1948	11,223	+5.38%
1960	14,669	+2.26%
1970	18,395	+2.29%
1975	19,544	+1.22%
1980	23,548	+3.80%
1990	27,515	+1.57%
1995	29,765	+1.48%
2000	39,041	+5.99%
2007	43,974	+1.65%
2010	51,705	+6.07%
2015	54,533	+1.02%
2020	59,114	+1.71%
2024	60,597	+0.60%
Source: Philippine Statistics Authority

Mansalay is notable for its indigenous Mangyan population.

== Economy ==
Poverty incidence of Mansalay (%)

Source: Philippine Statistics Authority

Its people relies heavily on fishing and farming to survive and earn a living. Because of meager income opportunities, Mansalay has produced a large number of overseas Filipino workers who send remittance back.

== Education ==
The Mansalay Schools District Office governs all educational institutions within the municipality. It oversees the management and operations of all private and public, from primary to secondary schools.

=== Primary and elementary schools ===
- Anahaw Elementary School
- Bait Elementary School
- Cabalwa Elementary School
- Cabuyao Elementary School
- Cagulong Elementary School
- Don B. Del Mundo Memorial School
- Dongnam Christian Academy
- Felipe C. Anastacio Elementary School
- Juan Arcemo Elementary School
- Kilapnit Elementary School
- Lamac Elementary School
- Leonardo delos Reyes Elementary School
- Leonardo U. Tugade Memorial School
- Lucban Primary School
- Macario A. Sandoval Elementary School
- Manaul Elementary School
- Mangyan Education Center
- Mansalay Catholic High School
- Mansalay Central School
- Mariano M. Marciano Memorial Elementary School (Himpaparay Elementary School)
- Panaytayan Elementary School
- Quinomay Elementary School
- Roma Elementary School
- Salay Elementary School
- Salvacion Elementary School
- Sinariri Elementary School
- Sta. Brigida Elementary School
- Sta. Maria Elementary School
- Teresita Elementary School
- Villarosa Elementary School
- Wasig Elementary School
- Waygan Elementary School
- Zhejohn Elementary School

=== Secondary schools ===
- Mansalay Catholic High School Inc.
- Balugo National High School
- Bonbon High School
- Don Pedro High School
- Dong Nam Full Gospel Senior High School
- Fe del Mundo National High School
- Manaul National High School
