= List of Cultural Properties of the Philippines in Naujan, Oriental Mindoro =

The list of Cultural Properties of the Philippines in Naujan, Oriental Mindoro contains relevant cultural buildings in the Philippine municipality of Naujan.

Cultural Property wmph identifier (Note: wmph is an internal identifier used by Wikimedia Philippines to identify the monument. This is not an official identifier, and only shown temporarily in the templates until the government creates an updated complete list.)	Site name	Description	Province	City or municipality	Address	Coordinates	Image
	Simbahang Bato	Built in 1600s, destroyed in 1824	Oriental Mindoro	Naujan		13°16′52″N 121°19′18″E	Upload file
	Jose L. Basa Memorial School	Built in 1913, rebuilt in 1946	Oriental Mindoro	Naujan		13°19′31″N 121°18′12″E	Upload file
	Naujan Academy	Established in 1945	Oriental Mindoro	Naujan		13°19′30″N 121°18′13″E	Upload file
	Naujan Catholic Cemetery	19th century	Oriental Mindoro	Naujan		13°19′33″N 121°18′07″E	Upload file
	Agustin Gutierrez Memorial Academy (formerly Mindoro Central Institute)	Built in the 1940s	Oriental Mindoro	Naujan		13°19′26″N 121°18′04″E	Upload file
	Unknown House		Oriental Mindoro	Naujan			Upload file
	Unknown House		Oriental Mindoro	Naujan			Upload file
	Unknown House		Oriental Mindoro	Naujan			Upload file
	Unknown House		Oriental Mindoro	Naujan			Upload file
	Gutierrez House	Built in 1964	Oriental Mindoro	Naujan			Upload file
	Gutierrez House	Built in 1956	Oriental Mindoro	Naujan			Upload file
	Unknown House (Hanna Ruiz Bakery)		Oriental Mindoro	Naujan	53 Mabini St.		Upload file
	Unknown House		Oriental Mindoro	Naujan			Upload file
	Unknown House		Oriental Mindoro	Naujan			Upload file
	Unknown House		Oriental Mindoro	Naujan			Upload file
	Unknown House		Oriental Mindoro	Naujan			Upload file
	Carandang House	Built in 1927	Oriental Mindoro	Naujan	69 Mabini St.		Upload file
	Cusi House	repaired	Oriental Mindoro	Naujan	072 Poblacion		Upload file
	Maraña Ancestral House	Japanese Headquarters during World War II; facing demolition	Oriental Mindoro	Naujan	043 Poblacion		Upload file
	Mañibo House		Oriental Mindoro	Naujan	001 Poblacion 3		Upload file
