= Bongabong =

Municipality in Oriental Mindoro, Philippines

- Municipality
- Municipality of Bongabong
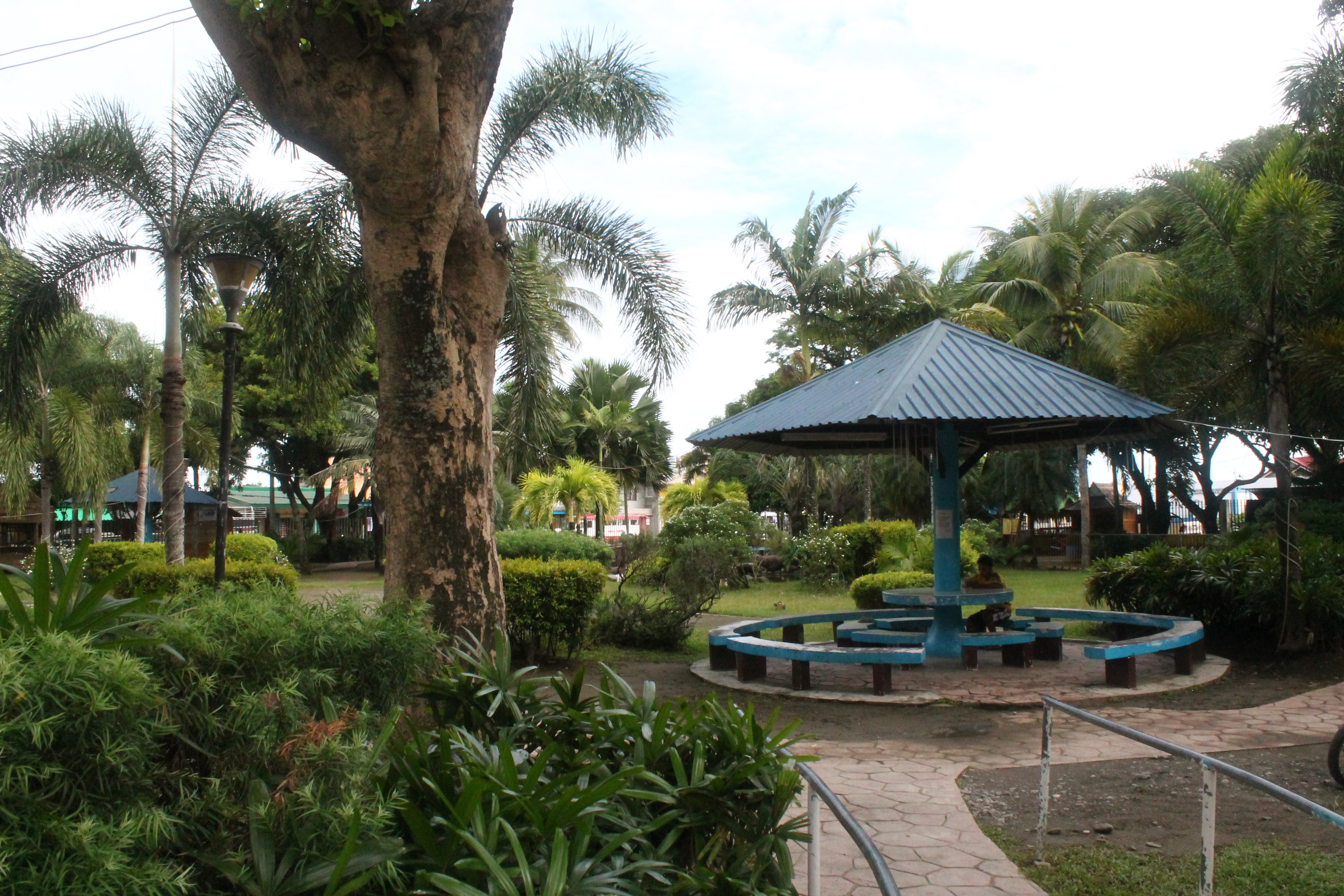
- Park and plaza

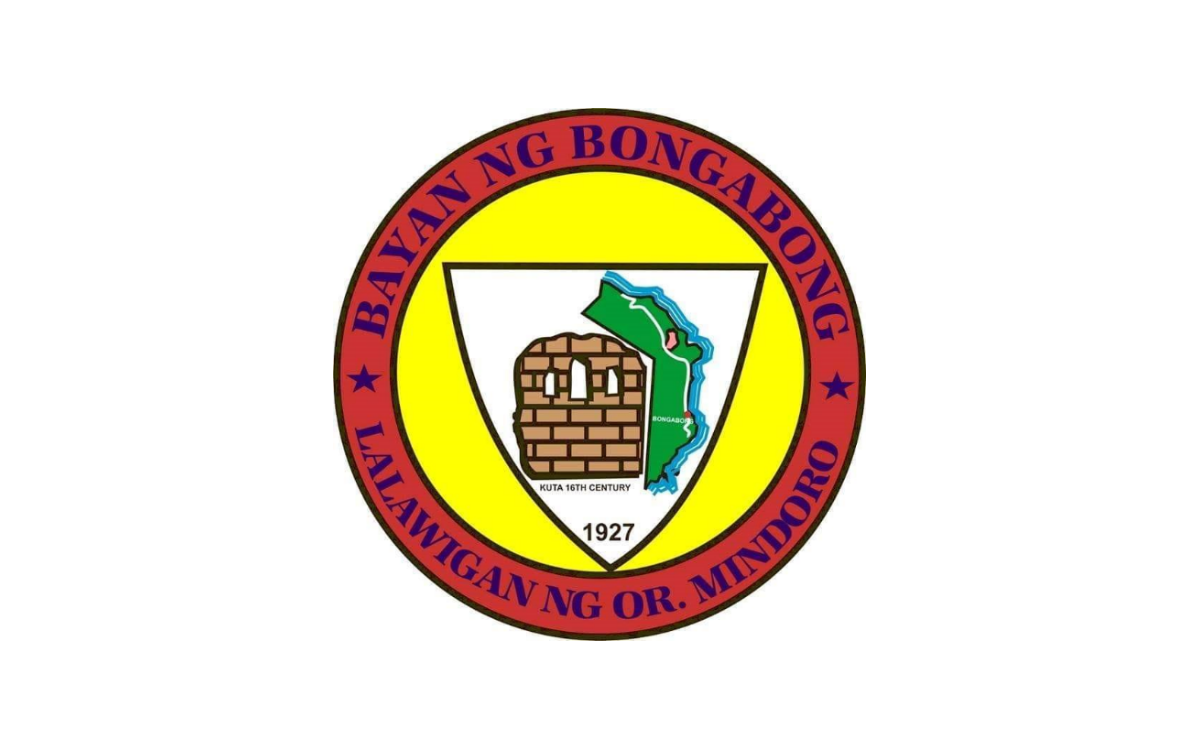
- Flag Seal

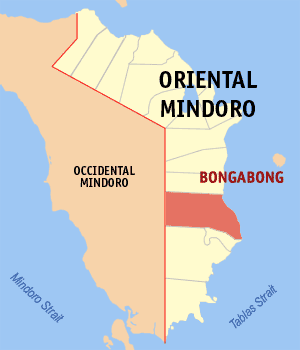
- Map of Oriental Mindoro with Bongabong highlighted
- Interactive map of Bongabong
- Location within the Philippines
- Coordinates: 12°44′49″N 121°29′17″E
- Country: Philippines
- Region: Mimaropa
- Province: Oriental Mindoro
- District: 2nd district
- Founded: 1927
- Barangays: 36 (see Barangays)

Government
  - Type: Sangguniang Bayan
  - Mayor: John Michael K. Malaluan
  - Vice Mayor: Jayson Macaraeg Barcelona
  - Representative: Alfonso V. Umali Jr.
  - Electorate: 48,137 voters (2025)

Area
  - Total: 498.20 km^{2} (192.36 sq mi)
- Elevation: 16 m (52 ft)
- Highest elevation: 136 m (446 ft)
- Lowest elevation: 0 m (0 ft)

Population (2024 census)
  - Total: 77,540
  - Density: 155.6/km^{2} (403.1/sq mi)
  - Households: 18,568

Economy
  - Income class: 1st municipal income class
  - Poverty incidence: 21.12% (2023)
  - Revenue: ₱ 435.3 million (2024)
  - Assets: ₱ 1,447 million (2024)
  - Expenditure: ₱ 376.1 million (2024)
  - Liabilities: ₱ 345.5 million (2024)

Service provider
  - Electricity: Oriental Mindoro Electric Cooperative (ORMECO)
- Time zone: UTC+8 (PST)
- ZIP code: 5211
- PSGC: 1705203000
- IDD : area code: +63 (0)43
- Native languages: Romblomanon; Tagalog
- Website: bongabong.gov.ph

Bongabong, officially the Municipality of Bongabong (Tagalog: Bayan ng Bongabong), is a municipality in the province of Oriental Mindoro, Philippines. According to the 2024 census, it has a population of 77,540 people.

It is known for its organic method of farming with its vast land area for farming, dubbed as the organic farming capital of the province.

== Geography ==
Bongabong is 104 kilometres (65 mi) from Calapan, the provincial capital.

=== Barangays ===
Bongabong is politically subdivided into 36 barangays. Each barangay consists of puroks and some have sitios.

- Anilao
- Aplaya
- Bagong Bayan I
- Bagong Bayan II
- Batangan
- Camantigue
- Bukal
- Carmundo
- Cawayan
- Dayhagan
- Formon
- Hagan
- Hagupit
- Ipil
- Kaligtasan
- Labasan
- Labonan
- Libertad
- Lisap
- Luna
- Malitbog
- Mapang
- Masaguisi
- Mina de Oro
- Morente
- Ogbot
- Orconuma
- Poblacion
- Pulosahi
- Sagana
- San Isidro
- San Jose
- San Juan
- Sta. Cruz
- Sigange
- Tawas

=== Climate ===
Climate data for Bongabong, Oriental Mindoro
Month	Jan	Feb	Mar	Apr	May	Jun	Jul	Aug	Sep	Oct	Nov	Dec	Year
Mean daily maximum °C (°F)	28 (82)	29 (84)	30 (86)	31 (88)	31 (88)	30 (86)	29 (84)	29 (84)	29 (84)	29 (84)	28 (82)	27 (81)	29 (84)
Mean daily minimum °C (°F)	21 (70)	21 (70)	22 (72)	23 (73)	25 (77)	25 (77)	25 (77)	25 (77)	25 (77)	24 (75)	23 (73)	23 (73)	24 (74)
Average precipitation mm (inches)	31 (1.2)	20 (0.8)	25 (1.0)	39 (1.5)	152 (6.0)	269 (10.6)	314 (12.4)	285 (11.2)	303 (11.9)	208 (8.2)	95 (3.7)	70 (2.8)	1,811 (71.3)
Average rainy days	9.5	7.1	9.0	11.3	21.0	25.7	28.1	26.5	27.3	24.6	16.5	12.1	218.7
Source: Meteoblue

== Demographics ==
Population census of Bongabong
Year	Pop.	±% p.a.
1939	8,054	—
1948	17,800	+9.21%
1960	22,018	+1.79%
1970	32,167	+3.86%
1975	38,358	+3.59%
1980	41,719	+1.69%
1990	50,213	+1.87%
1995	57,403	+2.54%
2000	59,477	+0.76%
2007	61,127	+0.38%
2010	66,569	+3.15%
2015	72,073	+1.52%
2020	76,973	+1.39%
2024	77,540	+0.18%
Source: Philippine Statistics Authority

== Economy ==
Poverty incidence of Bongabong (%)

Source: Philippine Statistics Authority

== Government ==
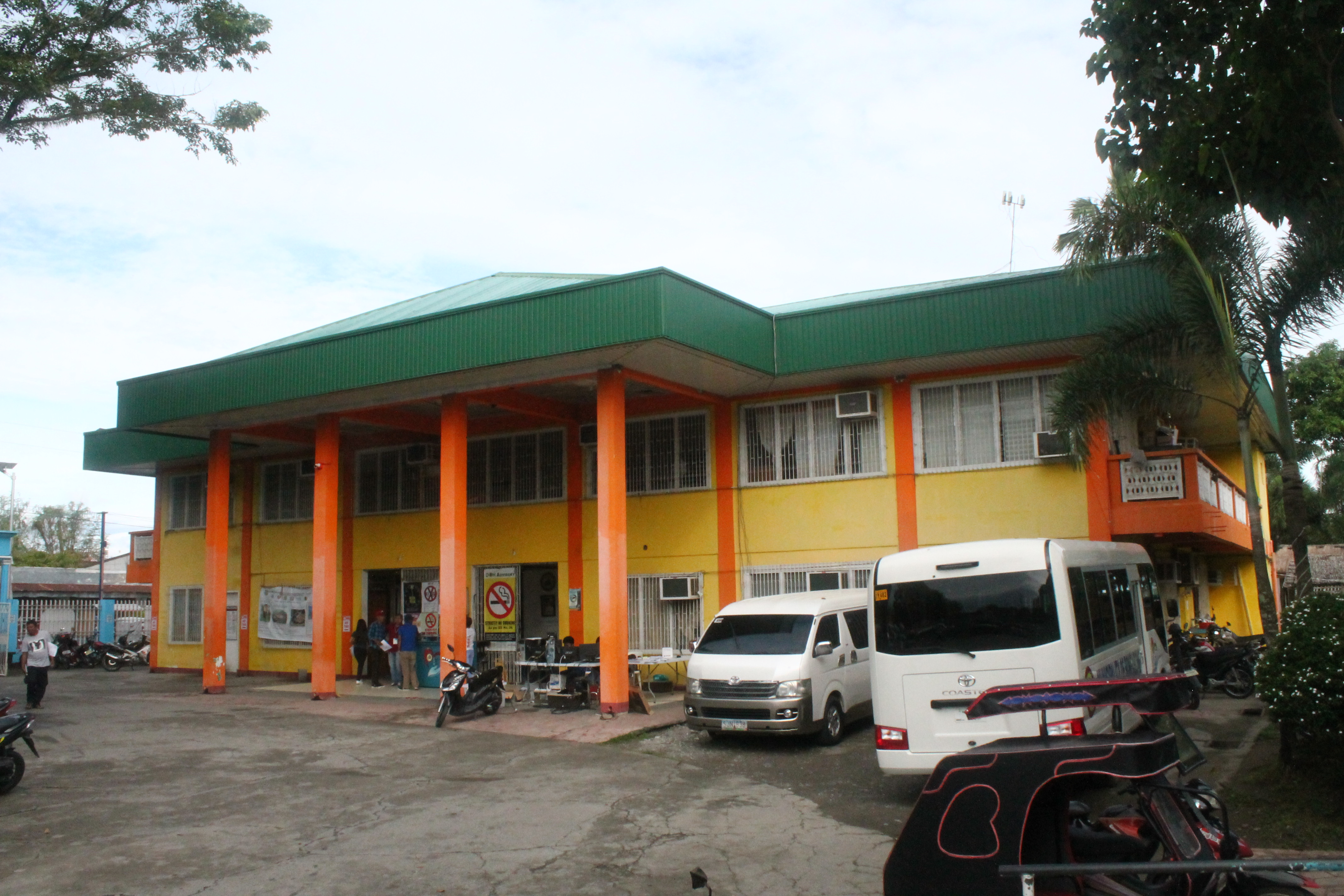
Bongabong Municipal Hall

=== Elected officials ===
(2025-Present):

- Mayor: John Michael Malaluan
- Vice Mayor: Jayson Barcelona
- Councilors:
  - Richard Totoy Candelario
  - Jeffrey Alea
  - Emy Enriquez
  - Niña Atienza
  - Dodie Liwanag
  - Melody Monreal
  - Arnold Villanueva
  - Cindee Guno
  - Natalio Doce (Liga President)
  - Jheremy Abel (SK Representative)
  - Matigon Suligan (IP Representative)

== Culture ==
The Kuta Church ruins in 2014

The town is home to Kuta Bongabong (Fuerza de Bongabong), one of the oldest Spanish colonial fortifications in the Philippines. The fort is in dire need of dedicated conservation efforts. As the leading authority, the National Museum of the Philippines is uniquely positioned to oversee the restoration of the fort as it possesses the specialized resources and capabilities required.

=== Festivals ===
The annual activities in Bongabong are as follows:

- Feast of St. Joseph and Sulyog Festival, March 19
- Bongabong Foundation Day, December 7

== Education ==
There are two schools district offices which govern all educational institutions within the municipality. They oversee the management and operations of all private and public, from primary to secondary schools. These are the Bongabong North Schools District, and Bongabong South Schools District.

=== Primary and elementary schools ===
- Anilao Elementary School
- Bagong Bayan Central School
- Batangan Elementary School
- Camantigue Elementary School
- Carmundo Elementary School
- Cawayan Elementary School
- Cupang Elementary School
- Dayhagan Elementary School
- Formon Elementary School
- Iglicerio Lopez Memorial Elementary School
- Kaligtasan Elementary School
- Labonan Elementary School
- Luna Elementary School
- Magdalena Umali Suyon Memorial Elementary School
- Masaguisi Elementary School
- Mina De Oro Elementary School
- Moises Abante Memorial Elementary School
- Morente Elementary School
- Orconuma Elementary School
- San Jose Elementary School
- Sebastian Umali Memorial Elementary School

=== Secondary schools ===
- Carmundo National High School
- Cawayan National High School
- Dayhagan National High School
- Formon National High School
- Innovative College of Science & Technology (Senior High School)
- Kaligtasan National High School
- Labasan National High School
- Masaguisi National High School
- Morente National High School
- St. Joseph Academy
- Vicente B. Ylagan National High School

=== Higher educational institutions ===
- Eastern Mindoro College
- Innovative College of Science & Technology
- Mindoro State University

== Notable people ==
- Rafael Arenillo Cusi, artist
- Mervin Guarte, middle distance runner

== See also ==
- Orconuma meteorite
