= Orconuma meteorite =

Solid debris from an outer space that fell in the Philippines

- Type: Chondrite
- Class: H3-4
- Shock stage: S2
- Weathering grade: W1
- Country: Philippines
- Region: Oriental Mindoro
- Coordinates: 12°38′53″N 121°31′19″E
- Observed fall: Yes
- Fall date: March 7, 2011
- TKW: 7.8 kilograms (17 lb)

The Orconuma meteorite is a meteorite that was discovered in the Philippines, and it is one of six meteorites from the Philippines listed in the Meteoritical Society's Bulletin database. The meteorite is thought to have formed about 4.6 billion years ago.

== History ==
The Orconuma meteorite fell to Earth on March 7, 2011, in Orconuma, Bongabong, Oriental Mindoro. It was discovered by three farmers, Fredo Manzano, Edgar Francisco Sr., and Enrico Camacho, Jr., who found the meteorite in the middle of a field.

The three farmers initially hid and stored the specimen before publicizing their discovery in 2019. Collectors John Higgins and Jasper Spencer would purchase the specimen after it was confirmed to be a meteorite. On July 8, 2022, Higgins and Spencer would donate a piece of the metoerite to the National Museum of the Philippines

== Classification ==
The Orconuma meteorite is classified as an H3-4 chondrite. This classification indicates that it is a type of stony meteorite that is rich in olivine and pyroxene, and it originated from the asteroid belt. The H3-4 classification also suggests that it underwent minimal thermal metamorphism on its parent body.
