= Naujan Lake =

Lake in Oriental Mindoro, Philippines

Naujan Lake National Park
- IUCN category IV (habitat/species management area)
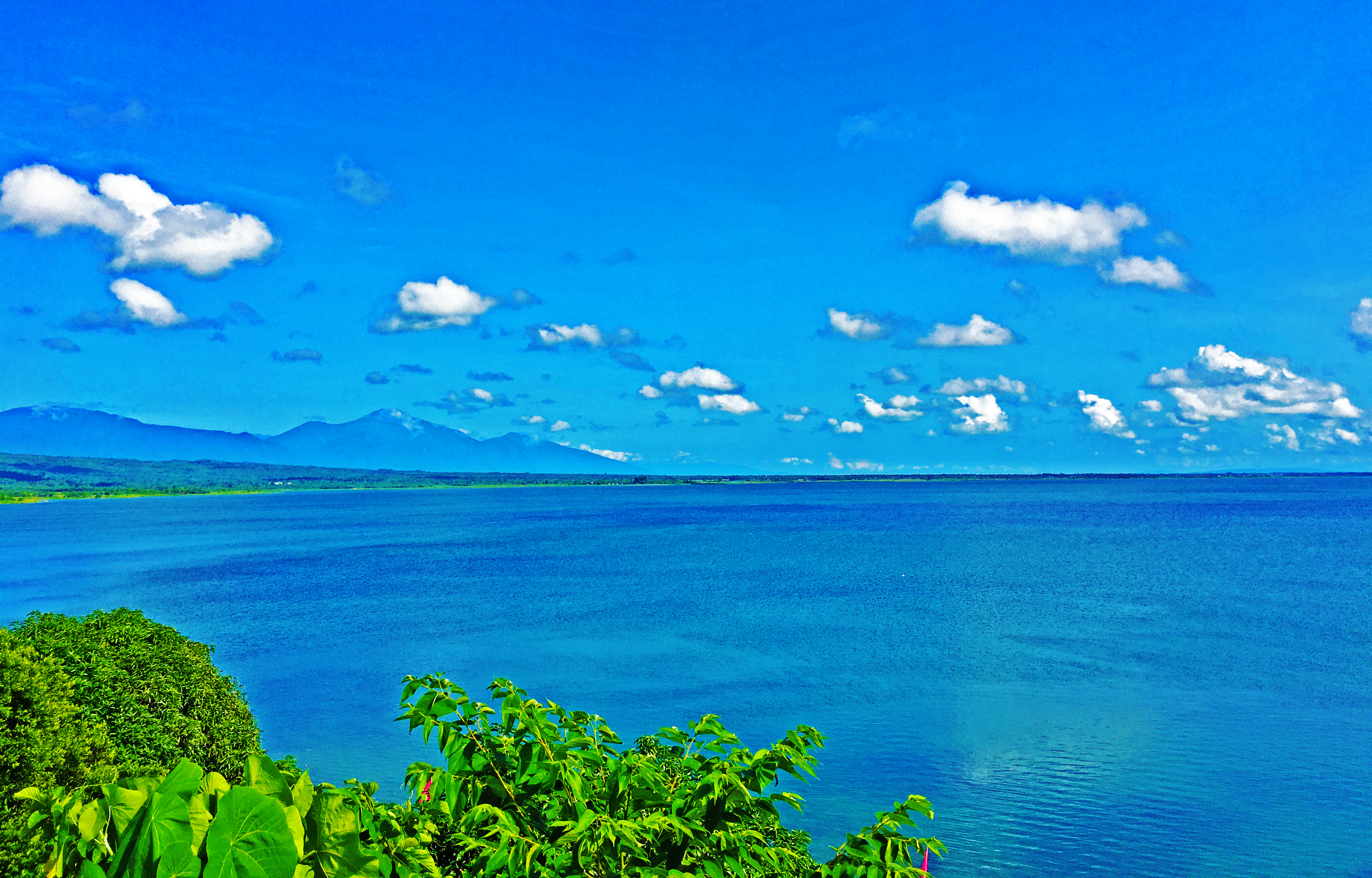

- Location within Luzon Location within Philippines
- Location: Oriental Mindoro
- Nearest town: Naujan, Pola, Socorro, and Victoria, Oriental Mindoro
- Coordinates: 13°10′N 121°20′E
- Area: 21,655 ha (83.61 sq mi)
- Established: March 27, 1956
- Governing body: Department of Environment and Natural Resources
- Naujan Lake
- Interactive map of Naujan Lake
- Location: Oriental Mindoro
- Coordinates: 13°10′N 121°20′E
- Type: Tectonic
- Primary outflows: Butas River (also called Naujan River)
- Max. length: 14 km (8.7 mi)
- Max. width: 7 km (4.3 mi)
- Surface area: 81.25 square kilometres (31.37 sq mi)
- Max. depth: 45 m (148 ft)
- Surface elevation: 20 m (66 ft)
- Islands: 3 islands

Ramsar Wetland
- Official name: Naujan Lake National Park
- Designated: November 12, 1999
- Reference no.: 1008

Naujan Lake (Filipino pronunciation: [naʔuˈhan]) is a freshwater lake in the Philippines located in the northeastern corner of the province of Oriental Mindoro on Mindoro Island. The lake is the fifth largest in the country and the main geographical feature of the Naujan Lake National Park. The entire area is a Ramsar Wetland Site since 1999.

== Geography ==
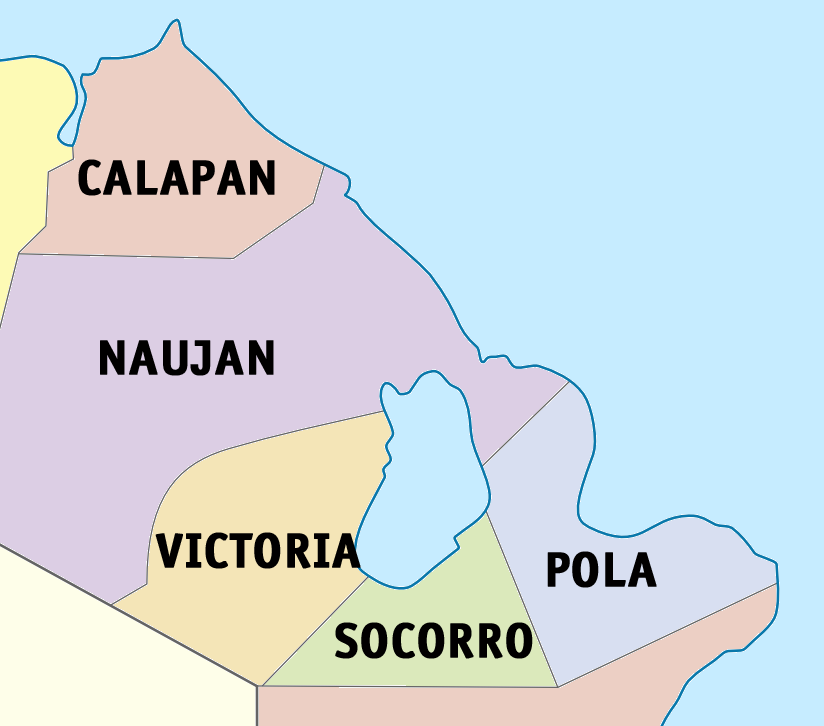
The lake along with the city of Calapan and nearby towns.

The lake is bounded by the towns of Naujan to the north and northeast, Victoria to the west, Socorro to the south and southeast, and Pola to the east. The lake is also bounded by the Naujan Mountains to the north and east of the lake.

Mount Naujan, elevation 1,380 feet (420 m) and one of the inactive volcanoes of the country, is situated northeast of the geographic center of the lake. Several thermal springs and solfataras are reported to exist on the eastern border of the Naujan Lake.

== Hydrology ==
The lakes watershed covers about 30,000 hectares (300 km^{2}). The lake is fed by the Macatoc, Borbocolon, Malayas, Malabo, Maambog, Malbog and Cusay Creek from the east; by Bambang, Tigbao and Tagbakin Creek from the west; and by Subaan and Singulan River from the south. The lake has only one outlet, the Butas River, which flow north then heads east after the Lumangbayan River joins the river and empties to Tablas Strait at Barangay Lumang-bayan, Naujan.

== National Park ==
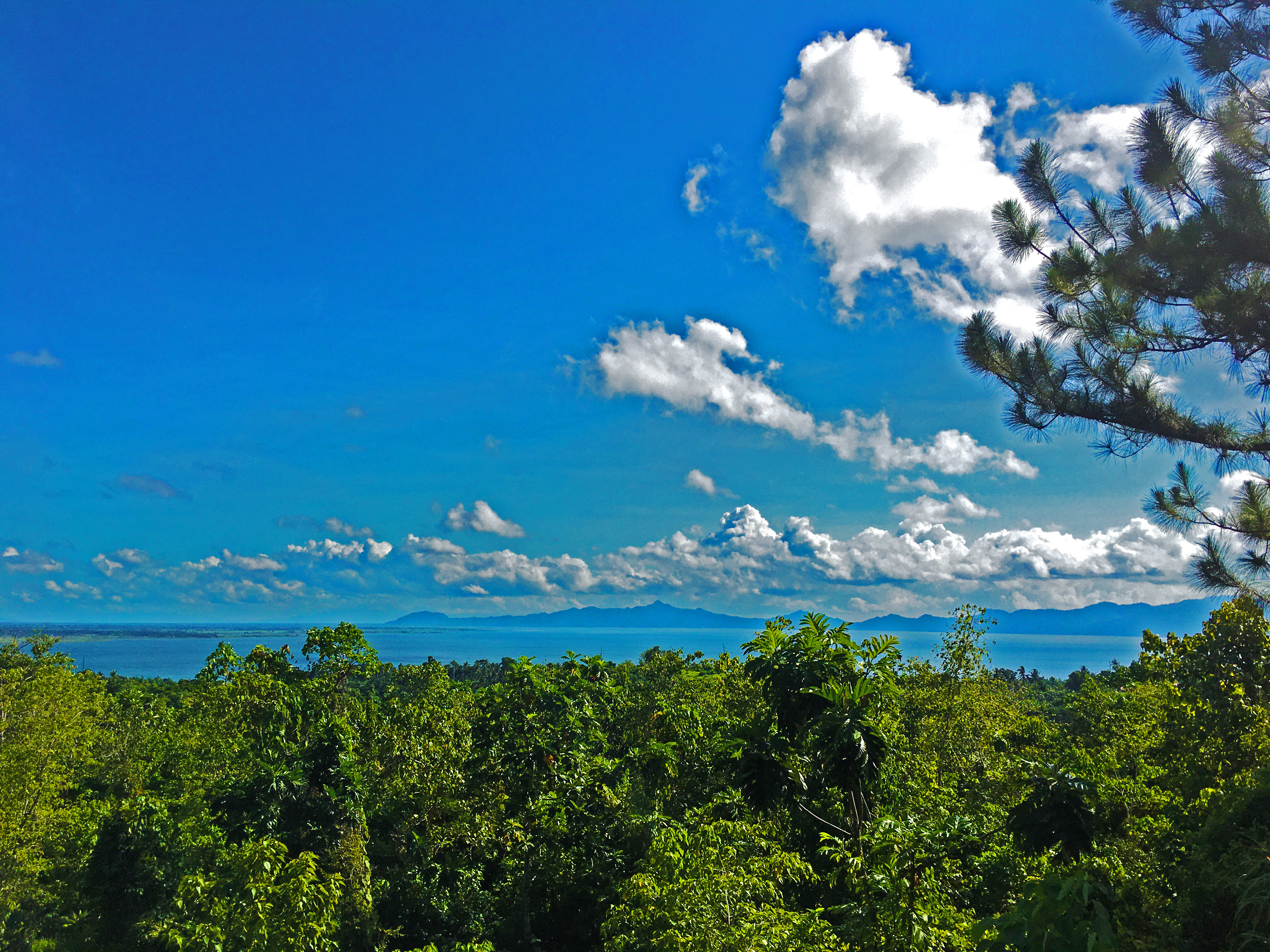
View of the Naujan Lake National Park

The lake, approximately 8,125 hectares (20,080 acres) in area, is the main feature of the protected area classified as a national park known as the Naujan Lake National Park (NLNP). The lake and adjoining areas totaling 21,655 hectares (53,510 acres) was declared a national park on March 27, 1956 through Proclamation No. 282 by President Ramon Magsaysay.

NLNP covers twenty-four (24) barangays under the jurisdiction of four municipalities, namely:

1. Naujan – Brgys. Bayani, Laguna, Montelago and Dao
2. Pola – Brgys. Matula-tula, Tagbakin and Casiligan
3. Socorro – Brgys. Lapog, Mabuhay I, Mabuhay II, Batongdalig, Pasi I, Pasi II, Happy Valley and Subaan
4. Victoria – Brgys. Merit, Daungan, Bambanin, Pakyas, Leido, Malabo, Urdaneta, San Narciso and Canaan

The Park has existing facilities for tourism and recreational activities which include picnic tables and a house/quarters located at Minglit Point. A guard house is located at Brgy. Malabo in Victoria town and a watch tower is located at CENRO in Pasi, Socorro. The park caters for recreational activities such as boating, picnics, bird watching, educational tour and scientific research. Also, the park is considered the widest breeding place of marsh birds and has a quarterly Biodiversity Monitoring System (BMS) which includes bird counting.

== See also ==
- List of national parks of the Philippines
- List of protected areas of the Philippines
