= Victoria, Oriental Mindoro =

Municipality in Oriental Mindoro, Philippines

Victoria
- Municipality
- Municipality of Victoria
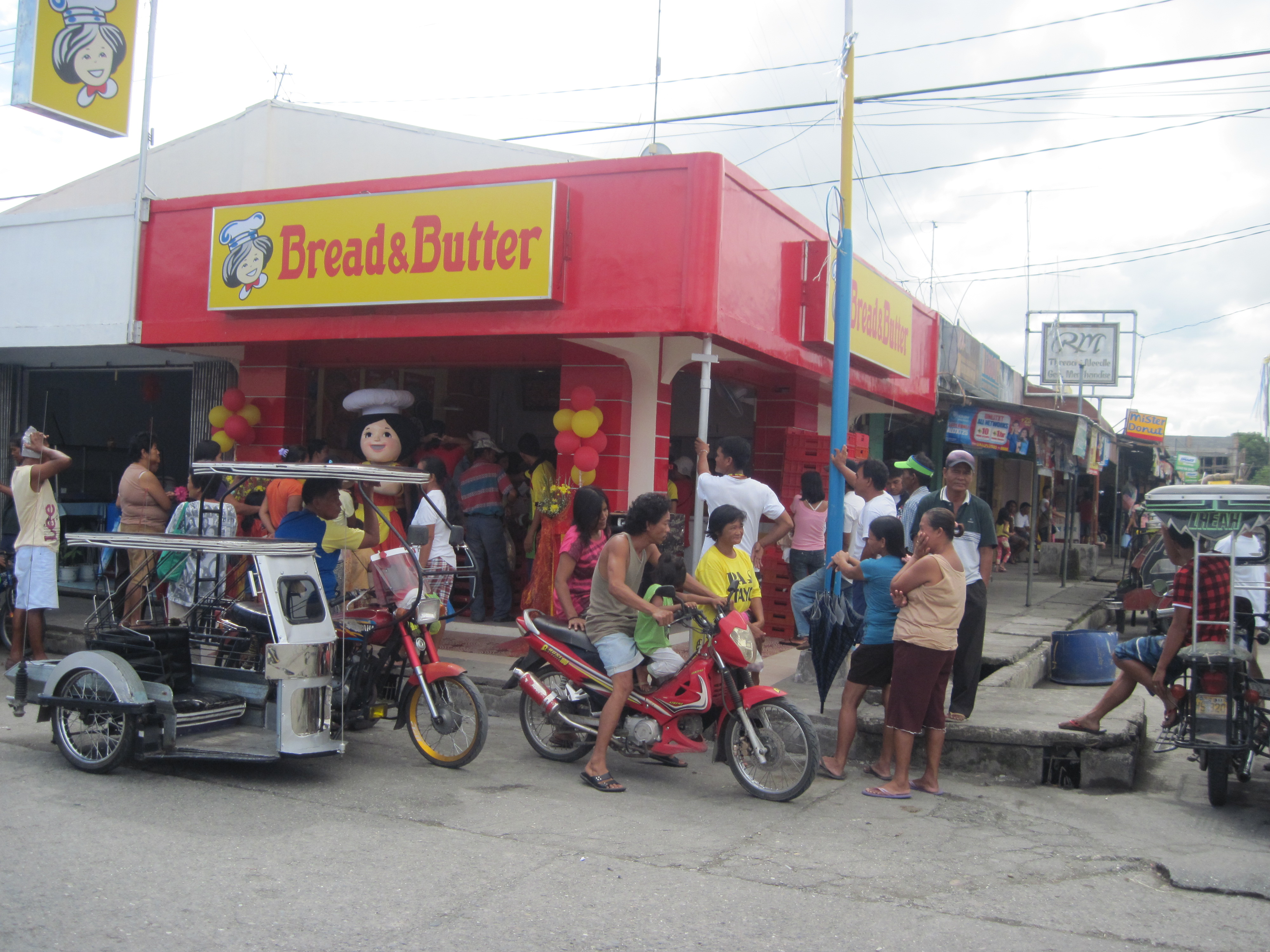
- Downtown area

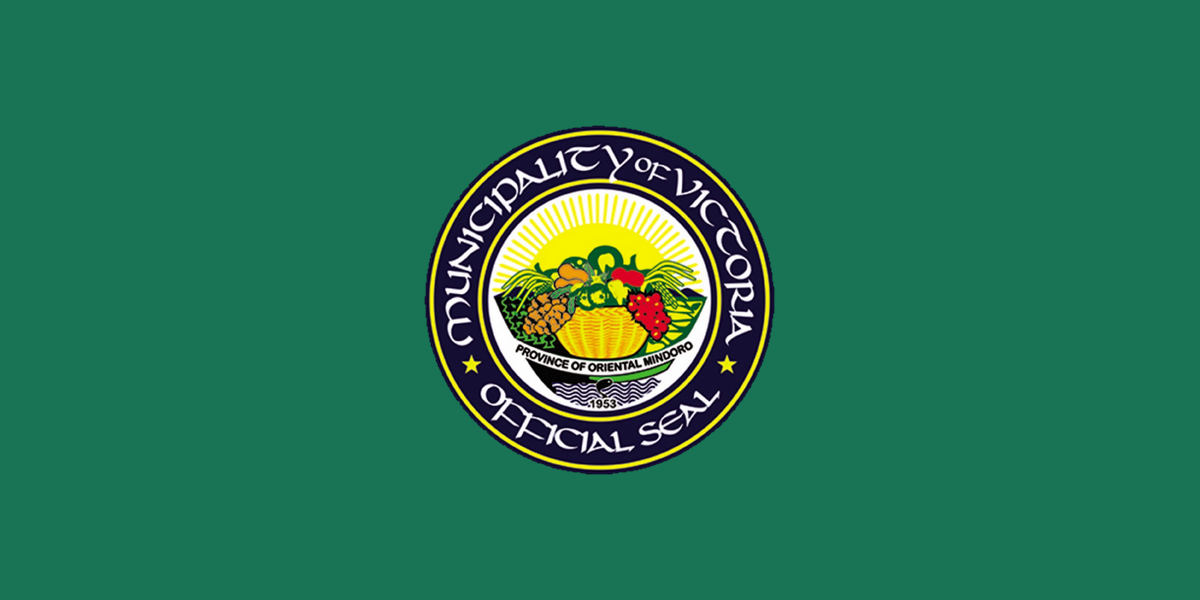
- Flag Seal
- Nickname: Fruit Basket of Oriental Mindoro
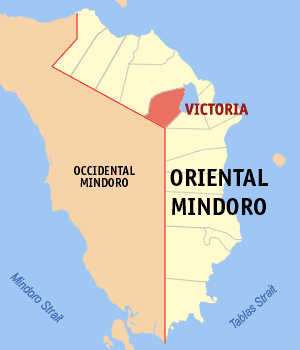
- Map of Oriental Mindoro with Victoria highlighted
- Interactive map of Victoria
- Location within the Philippines
- Coordinates: 13°10′19″N 121°16′32″E
- Country: Philippines
- Region: Mimaropa
- Province: Oriental Mindoro
- District: 1st district
- Founded: October 15, 1955
- Named for: Victoria Quirino
- Barangays: 32 (see Barangays)

Government
  - Type: Sangguniang Bayan
  - Mayor: Richard "RVI" V. Inciong
  - Vice Mayor: Joselito "LM" C. Malabanan
  - Representative: Arnan C. Panaligan
  - Electorate: 33,171 voters (2025)

Area
  - Total: 146.23 km^{2} (56.46 sq mi)
- Elevation: 34 m (112 ft)
- Highest elevation: 248 m (814 ft)
- Lowest elevation: 4 m (13 ft)

Population (2024 census)
  - Total: 52,215
  - Density: 357.07/km^{2} (924.82/sq mi)
  - Households: 12,250

Economy
  - Income class: 1st municipal income class
  - Poverty incidence: 13.36% (2023)
  - Revenue: ₱ 302.7 million (2024)
  - Assets: ₱ 824.6 million (2024)
  - Expenditure: ₱ 307.4 million (2024)
  - Liabilities: ₱ 296.9 million (2024)

Service provider
  - Electricity: Oriental Mindoro Electric Cooperative (ORMECO)
- Time zone: UTC+8 (PST)
- ZIP code: 5205
- PSGC: 1705215000
- IDD : area code: +63 (0)43
- Native languages: Alangan; Tagalog

Victoria, officially the Municipality of Victoria (Tagalog: Bayan ng Victoria, Ilocano: Ili ti Victoria), is a municipality in the province of Oriental Mindoro, Philippines. According to the 2024 census, it has a population of 52,215 people.

It is known as the fruit basket of the province. The town celebrates its annual Kapakyanan Festival every October 15 as graces and thanksgiving for the bountiful blessings that every Victoreños received from God.

== History ==
Victoria was once part of the municipality of Naujan until its creation on October 15, 1953, and was originally known as Barbocolon, meaning “a big river”.

The municipality was named after Victoria Quirino, daughter of President Elpidio Quirino, who served as First Lady.

== Geography ==
It is 36 kilometres (22 mi) from Calapan.

=== Barangays ===
Victoria is politically subdivided into 32 barangays. Each barangay consists of puroks and some have sitios.

Currently, there are 6 barangays which classified as urban (highlighted in bold).

- **Alcate**
- Antonino (Mainao)
- Babangonan
- Bagong Buhay
- Bagong Silang
- Bambanin
- Bethel
- Canaan
- Concepcion
- Duongan
- **Leido**
- Loyal
- Mabini
- **Macatoc**
- Malabo
- Merit
- Ordovilla
- Pakyas
- **Poblacion I**
- **Poblacion II**
- **Poblacion III**
- Poblacion IV
- Sampaguita
- San Antonio
- San Cristobal
- San Gabriel
- San Gelacio
- San Isidro
- San Juan
- San Narciso
- Urdaneta
- Villa Cerveza

=== Climate ===
Climate data for Victoria, Oriental Mindoro
Month	Jan	Feb	Mar	Apr	May	Jun	Jul	Aug	Sep	Oct	Nov	Dec	Year
Mean daily maximum °C (°F)	26 (79)	28 (82)	29 (84)	31 (88)	31 (88)	30 (86)	29 (84)	29 (84)	29 (84)	29 (84)	28 (82)	27 (81)	29 (84)
Mean daily minimum °C (°F)	22 (72)	22 (72)	22 (72)	23 (73)	25 (77)	25 (77)	25 (77)	25 (77)	25 (77)	24 (75)	23 (73)	23 (73)	24 (75)
Average precipitation mm (inches)	115 (4.5)	66 (2.6)	55 (2.2)	39 (1.5)	164 (6.5)	282 (11.1)	326 (12.8)	317 (12.5)	318 (12.5)	192 (7.6)	119 (4.7)	173 (6.8)	2,166 (85.3)
Average rainy days	13.6	9.4	10.4	10.5	21.1	26.0	29.0	27.6	27.5	23.1	16.7	16.1	231
Source: Meteoblue

== Demographics ==
Population census of Victoria
Year	Pop.	±% p.a.
1960	11,662	—
1970	18,499	+4.72%
1975	23,568	+4.98%
1980	26,225	+2.16%
1990	34,760	+2.86%
1995	35,828	+0.57%
2000	42,873	+3.92%
2007	44,932	+0.65%
2010	48,308	+2.67%
2015	50,492	+0.85%
2020	52,175	+0.69%
2024	52,215	+0.02%
Source: Philippine Statistics Authority

Out of the 32 barangays of Victoria, eight are perceived to be Ilokano dominated communities. In fact, several Punong Barangays (Barangay Captains) and kagawads are Ilokanos. One barangay is even a namesake of the place where they came from: Urdaneta.

== Economy ==
Poverty incidence of Victoria (%)

Source: Philippine Statistics Authority

== Education ==
The Victoria Schools District Office governs all educational institutions within the municipality. It oversees the management and operations of all private and public, from primary to secondary schools.

=== Primary and elementary schools ===
- ACMCL College
- Alcate Elementary School
- Ali-aly Roldan Memorial Elementary School
- Antonino Elementary School
- Bagong Buhay Elementary School
- Bethel Elementary School
- Duongan Elementary School
- Good Shepherd Academy
- Jesus Is Lord Christian School
- Jose P. Viola Villarica Memorial Elementary School
- Loyal Elementary School
- Macatoc Elementary School
- Minas Elementary School
- Pakyas Elementary School
- San Antonio Elementary School
- Simon Gayutin Memorial Elementary School
- Victoria Central School
- Villa Cerveza Elementary School

=== Secondary schools ===
- ACMCL College
- Alcate National High School
- Aurelio Arago Memorial National High School
- Bethel High School
- Fortunato G. Perez High School
- Good Shepherd Academy
- Our Lady of the Most Holy Rosary Academy
- Lakeside Institute
- Macatoc National High School
- Oriental Mindoro Academy
- Victoria High School

=== Higher educational institutions ===
- ACMCL College
- Mina de Oro Institute of Science and Technology
- Mindoro State University

== Notable personalities ==
- Rachel Anne M. Bustamante, a.k.a. Shey Bustamante - Miss Oriental Mindoro 2009, runner-up in Binibining Pilipinas 2010 Contestant and a Pinoy Big Brother: Teen Clash 2010 Housemate. She is one of the Artist and Talent of Star Magic of ABS-CBN Corporation.
