= Rafael Arenillo Cusi =

Filipino artist (born 1950)

Rafael "Popoy" Arenillo Cusi
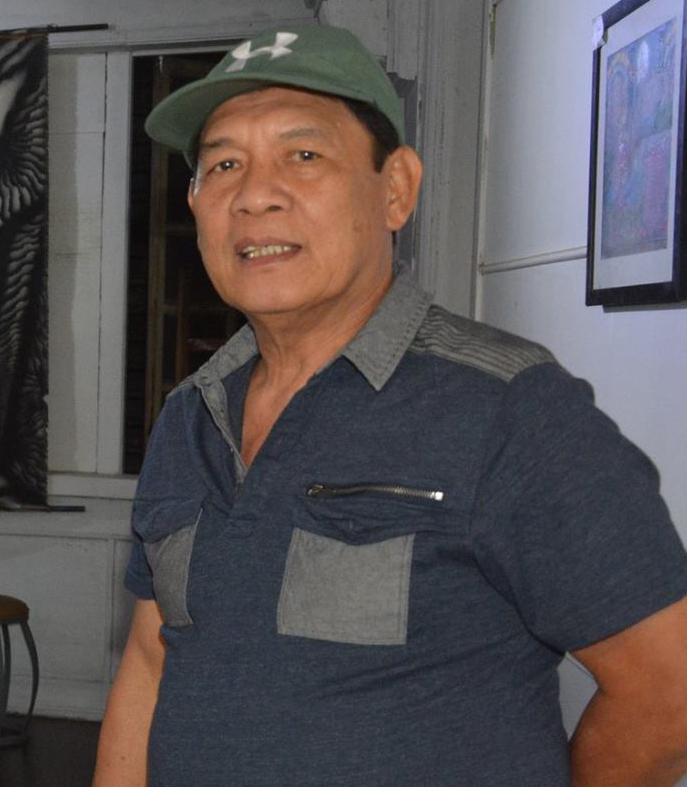
- Cusi in 2015
- Born: Rafael Arenillo Cusi; October 24, 1950 (age 75); Bongabong, Oriental Mindoro, Philippines
- Known for: Watercolour

Rafael Arenillo Cusi, also known by his nickname Popoy Cusi, is a Filipino artist who specializes in watercolour. He is also dubbed as the "Master of Watercolour in the Philippines" and is acclaimed as one of the top artist of the Philippines in his times including other artists who also specializes in watercolor.

== Personal life ==
Rafael Arenillo Cusi was born on October 24, 1950, in Bongabong, Oriental Mindoro as son of Lucas Cusi, and Josefa Arenillo. His father, also a painter, influenced him to be involved in art. Like many new artists who are just starting, he applied his talent in small gigs by making street art like mural, billboard and sign painting. He is married to Ma. Cristina Verroya and have 3 children named Tanya, Raiza, and Ralph.

== Education and career ==
During the later years of his time as a high school student he was commissioned to finish a mural by a Peace Corps volunteer. Through the help of Peace Corps, he was able to pursue his studies in Philippine Women's University. During the first three years of his college years he also had a part-time job for Allied Thread a dyeing company.

He dedicated himself to professional painting. Several grants and scholarships were awarded to him by different foundations. He received a Kahn Scholarship grant, a Ford Foundation tour grant to study the cultural minorities of the country, and Zarzuela Foundation grantee to receive an 8 months tour of ASEAN nations together with other painters Edgar Doctor and Liongoren. He also studied printmaking under Manuel Rodriguez Sr. at the Contemporary Graphic Art workshop.

He has exhibited his works throughout the Philippines and around the world like Japan, Spain, Belgium, Malaysia, Thailand, Indonesia, England, and the US. His works received positive reception. Numerous awards were given to him like "Arts Environmental Award" in Rome. He also published books like "Philippine Coral Reefs in Watercolor". His works are featured in several art books on Philippine Art by Filipino authors.

== See also ==
- Art of the Philippines
- Watercolor painting
- National Artist of the Philippines
- Culture of the Philippines
