= Simbahang Bato (Naujan) =

Roman Catholic church in Oriental Mindoro, Philippines

- Bancuro Church
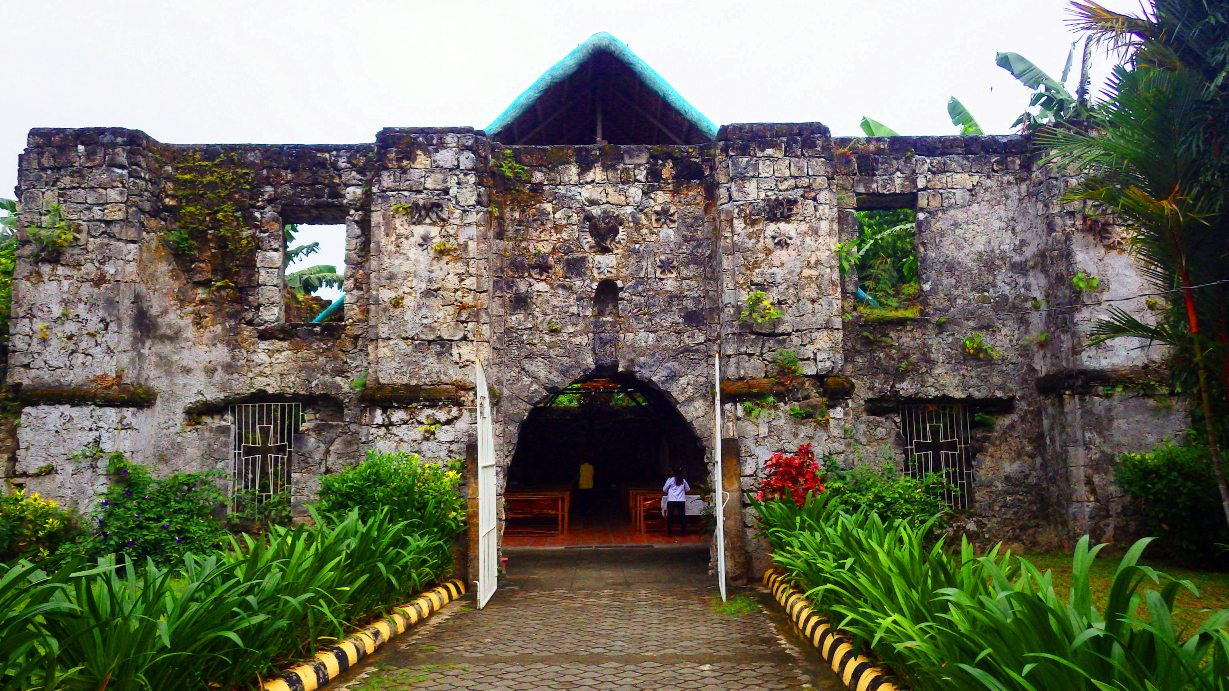
- The facade of Bancuro Church ruins in 2015

- Location in Luzon Location in the Philippines
- 13°16′52″N 121°19′18″E
- Location: Barangay Bancuro, Naujan, Oriental Mindoro
- Country: Philippines
- Denomination: Roman Catholic

Architecture
- Functional status: Active
- Architectural type: Church building

Administration
- Province: Lipa
- Metropolis: Lipa
- Archdiocese: Lipa
- Diocese: Apostolic Vicariate of Calapan
- Parish: St. Augustine

Clergy
- Archbishop: Gilbert Armea Garcera
- Bishop: Moises Magpantay Cuevas

The Bancuro Church, locally known as Simbahang Bato (transl. Stone Church), is a ruined Roman Catholic church located in Barangay Bancuro, Naujan, Oriental Mindoro, Philippines. It earned the moniker "a church within a church" because a small chapel is currently housed within the ruins' massive walls.

== History ==
The Simbahang Bato was built during the 1680s-1690s when the Augustinians established their first settlement in Bancuro, Naujan. Its thick walls were made of coraline stones and bonded by lime mortar. The Simbahang Bato was originally built as a convent and became a parish. In 1842 Moro invaders carried out the Asultos de Moro, the great raid on the island of Mindoro, destroying the first settlement in Bancuro and because of this, the church served not only as a house of worship but also as a fort and refuge for locals. In 1858, the capital of Naujan was transferred from Bancuro to "Bulwagan" Naujan. It then became a pastoral community of San Nicolás de Tolentino Parish under the supervision of the Society of the Divine Word in 1937. In 2006, the San Agustin Chaplaincy took over the pastoral work of the Simbahang Bato.

== Archaeology ==
In 2004, the University of the Philippines Archaeological Studies Program excavated in the church ruins with the goal of investigating the main settlement of Naujan, as mentioned in old written documents. Initially seen as a suspicious activity ahead of the 2004 national and local elections, the excavations contributed to the tourism sector when the municipal and provincial governments included the Bancuro Church Ruins in their list of tourist attractions.

== Gallery ==
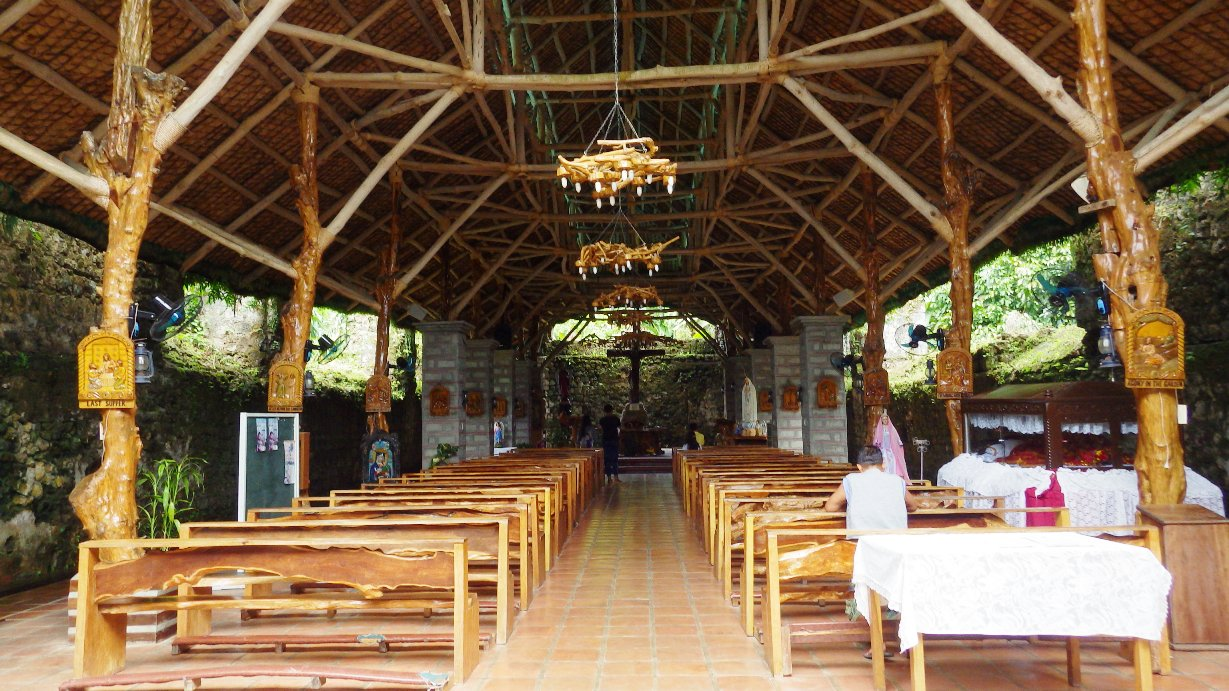
Church nave in 2015

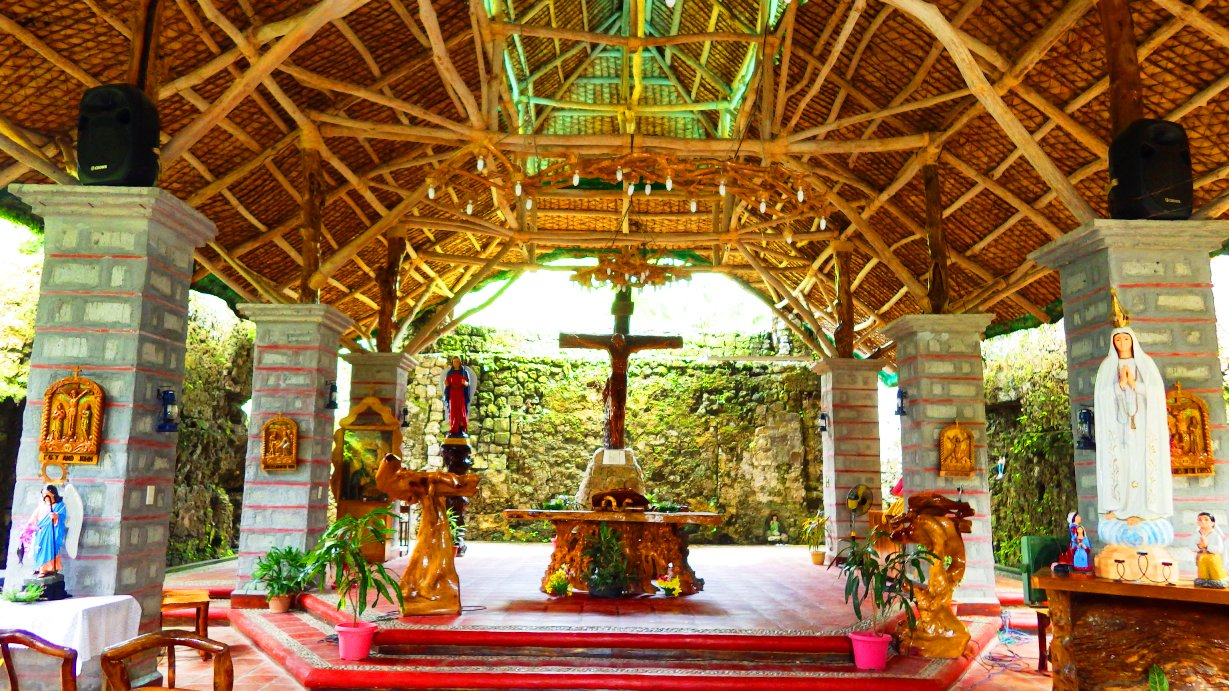
Church sanctuary

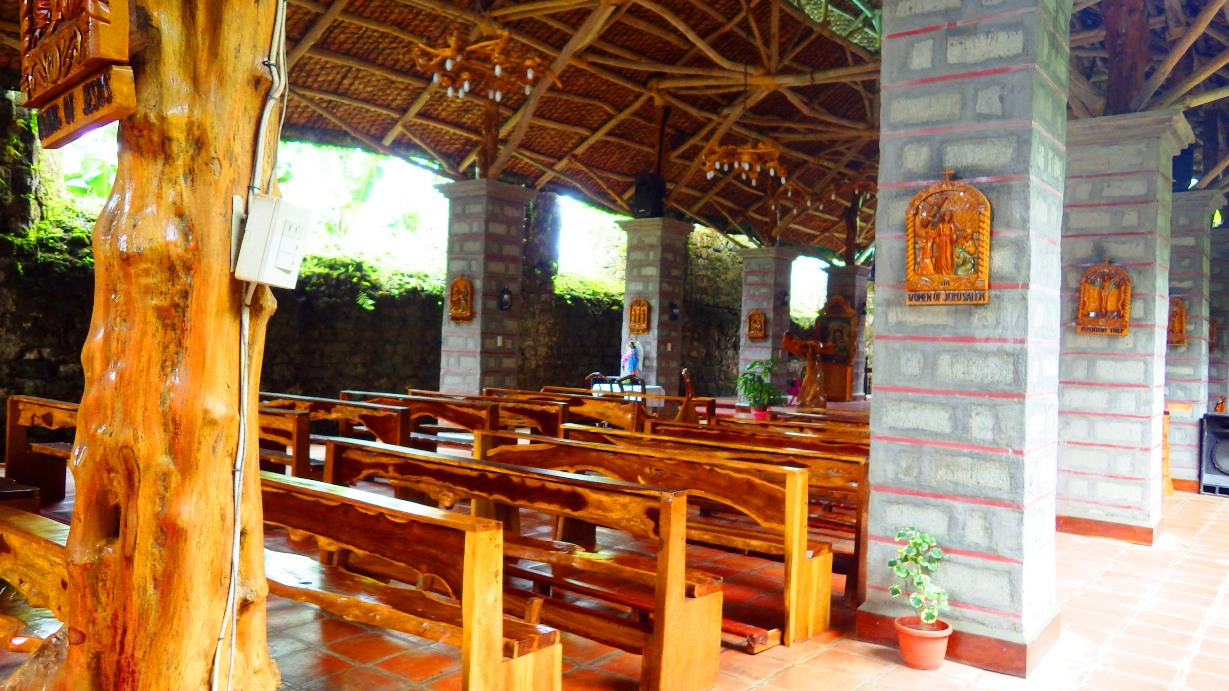
Church pews

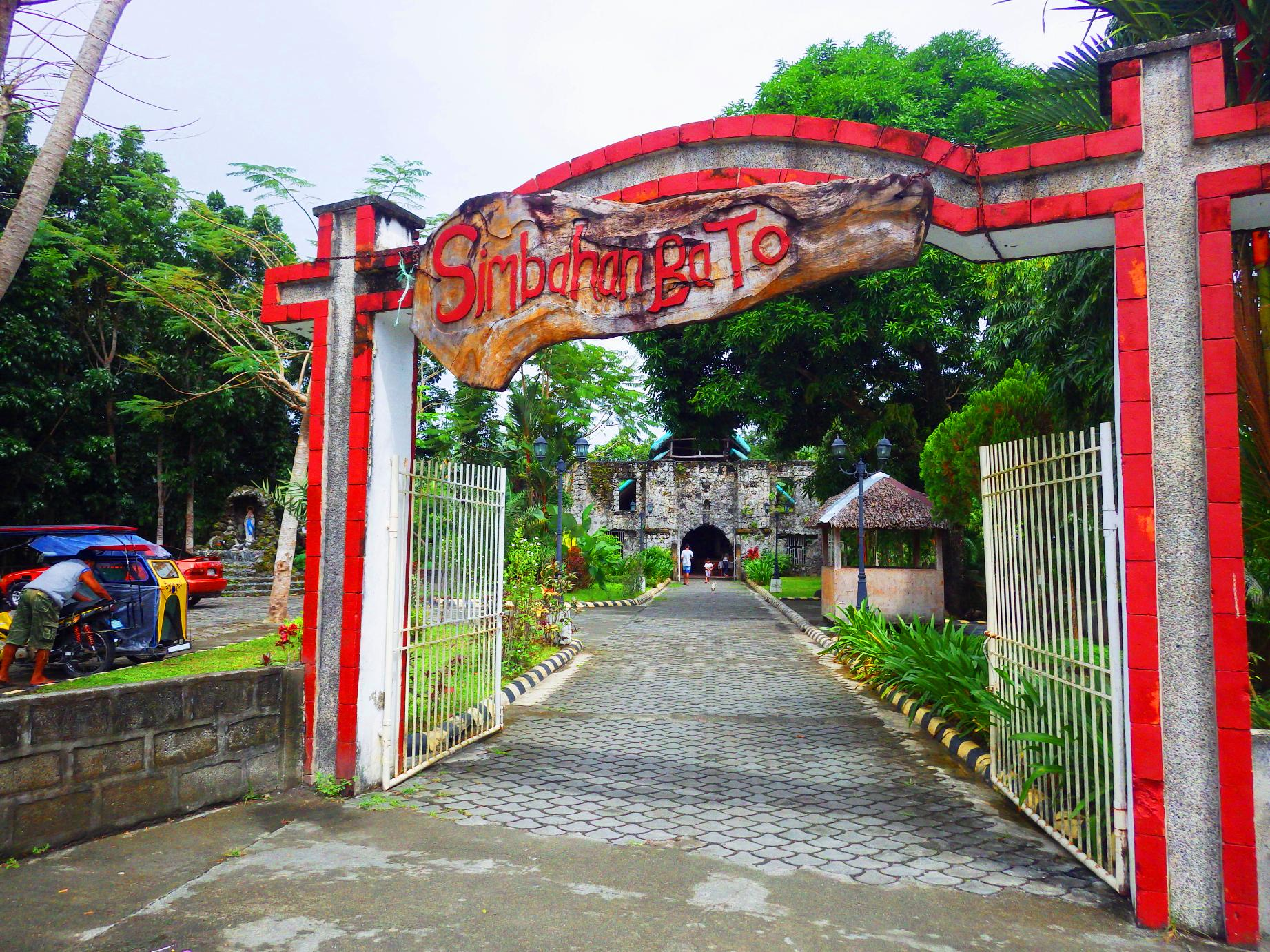
Church gate
