= Mindoro State University =

Public university in Oriental Mindoro, Philippines

- Pamantasang Pampamahalaan ng Mindoro (Filipino)
- Former names: Mindoro National Agricultural School (1951–1996); Mindoro State College of Agriculture and Technology (1996–2021)
- Type: State/public university
- Established: 1951; 75 years ago
- President: Dr. Enya Marie D. Apostol
- Vice-president: Dr. Ciedelle P. Salazar (Academic & Student Affairs); Prof. Rovelyn P. Roxas (OIC, Administration, Finance & Operations); Prof. Leonel C. Mendoza (OIC, Research, Innovation, Technology & Extension)
- Faculty: 188
- Students: 10,531
- Location: Alcate, Victoria, Oriental Mindoro, Philippines; 13°09′16″N 121°11′10″E
- Campus: Main Campus; Calapan City Campus; Bongabong Campus
- Colors
- Nickname: MinSU Carabaos
- Sporting affiliations: SCUAA
- Mascot: Carabao
- Website: minsu.edu.ph
- Location in the Luzon Location in the Philippines

Mindoro State University (MinSU or Mindoro SU), formerly known as the Mindoro State College of Agriculture and Technology (MinSCAT), is a public state higher education institution in Oriental Mindoro, Philippines. It is mandated to provide higher vocational, professional and technical instruction and training in agricultural, fisheries and industrial fields. It is also mandated to promote research, advanced studies and progressive leadership in the fields of agriculture including agricultural education and home technology, with special emphasis given to agricultural industry, fishery, forestry, and industrial education. Its main campus is located in the municipality of Victoria.

== History ==
The Mindoro State University (MinSu) was originally the Mindoro National Agricultural School (MINAS) created by R.A. 506 as a national agricultural secondary public school in the Municipality of Victoria (formerly part of Naujan) Oriental Mindoro. It formally opened its doors for learning on August 26, 1951.

In 1963, by authority of R.A. 3758, it opened the Collegiate Department. This steered the offering of several collegiate courses. The first two years leading to the degree of Bachelor of Science in agriculture (BSA) was initially offered. This was followed by the two-year course leading to Associate in Agricultural Technology (AAT) in 1973, then the complete course offering of Bachelor of Science in Agricultural Education (BSAE) in 1975 and the BSA curriculum developed by the Technical Panel for Agricultural Education (TPAE) based at Los Baños, Laguna was adopted by the school. This gradually replaced the BSA curriculum as well as the BSAE.

The continued offering of Collegiate courses, in addition to the secondary curriculum which was offered since the founding of the school made MINAS a full-fledged college hence; the change of name from MINAS to MCAT was approved on June 10, 1976, by then Secretary Juan L. Manuel of the Department of Education, Culture and Sports. It was converted as a State College by virtue of R.A. 8007 on May 25, 1995. The Bongabong College of Fisheries and Polytechnic College of Calapan was integrated to it. Then, on June 4, 2013 by virtue of R.A. 10596, it was converted to a State University provided all six (6) procedural requirements are complied as certified by CHED. On March 16, 2021, by virtue of CEB Resolution No. 110-2021, CHED certified the full compliance of MinSCAT to the said procedural requirements and granted the latter the University status and appointing Dr. Levy B. Arago Jr. as its first University President.

== Campuses ==
=== Bongabong Campus ===
- Labasan, Bongabong

Originally the Bongabong School of Fisheries (BSF), established on September 21, 1964, by virtue of R.A. 3306. IN 1975, the government approved the offering of the Revised Fishery Technical Education Curriculum. It was converted into a full-fledged college as the Bongabong College of Fisheries (BCF) on July 15, 1995, by virtue of R.A. 8143.

The current Campus Executive Director is Dr. Enya Marie Apostol.

=== Calapan City Campus ===
- Masipit, Calapan City

Established as a public secondary trade school known as Calapan School of Arts and Trades (CSAT) by virtue of R.A. 3397 in June 1961 but only started operating five years later. In 1972, CSAT merited the approval of Ministry of Education, Culture and Sports (MECS) to offer trade Technical Education Curriculum. Efforts to convert CSAT into a higher education authorized to offer degree courses were realized with the approval of R.A. 8076 on June 19, 1995, converting CSAT to Polytechnic College of Calapan (PCC). With the integration, then PCC has evolved as MinSu Mindoro State University.

The current Campus Executive Director is Dr. Elvi C. Escarez.
