= Naujan =

Municipality in Oriental Mindoro, Philippines

- Municipality
- Municipality of Naujan
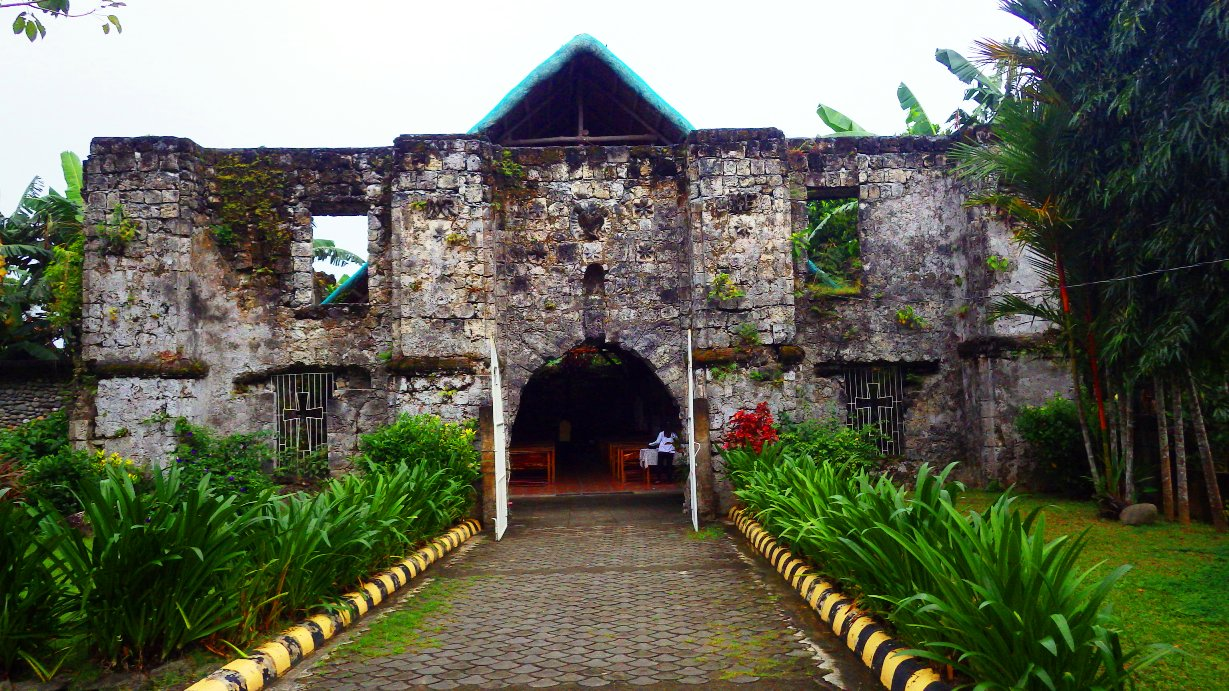
- Naujan Church

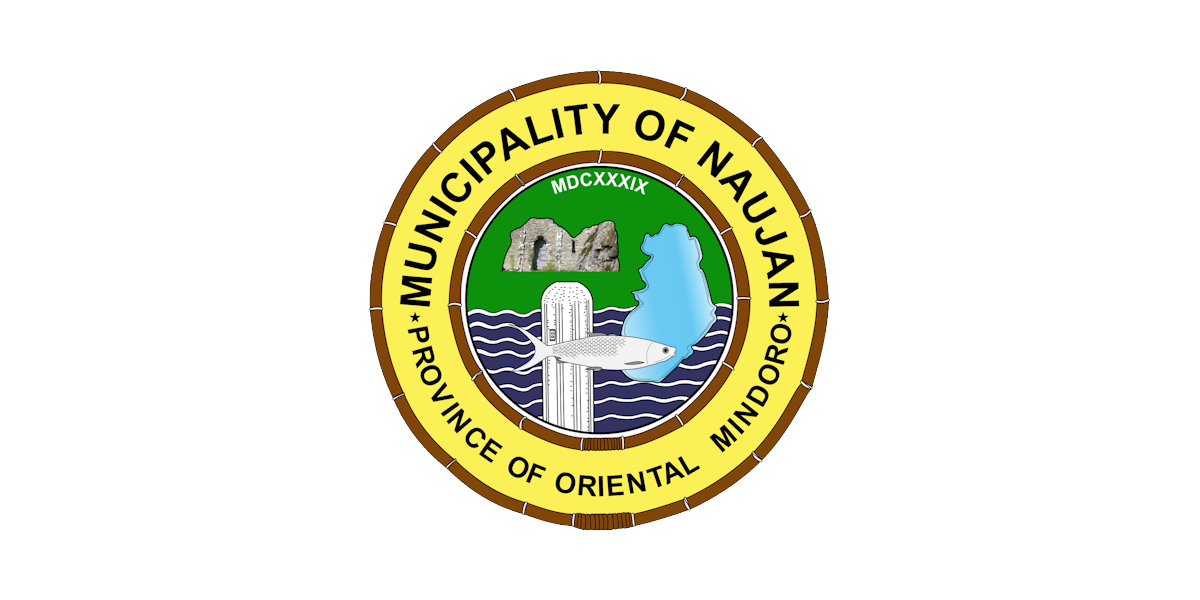
- Flag Seal
- Nickname: Home of DaBaLisTiHit Festival
- Map of Oriental Mindoro with Naujan highlighted
- Interactive map of Naujan
- Location within the Philippines
- Coordinates: 13°19′24″N 121°18′10″E
- Country: Philippines
- Region: Mimaropa
- Province: Oriental Mindoro
- District: 1st district
- Founded: 1693
- Incorporated: 1905
- Barangays: 71 (see Barangays)

Government
  - Type: Sangguniang Bayan
  - Mayor: Henry Joel C. Teves
  - Vice Mayor: Candido J. Melgar Jr.
  - Representative: Arnan C. Panaligan
  - Electorate: 64,553 voters (2025)

Area
  - Total: 503.10 km^{2} (194.25 sq mi)
- Elevation: 99 m (325 ft)
- Highest elevation: 476 m (1,562 ft)
- Lowest elevation: 0 m (0 ft)

Population (2024 census)
  - Total: 109,122
  - Density: 216.90/km^{2} (561.77/sq mi)
  - Households: 26,504
- Demonym: Naujeño/a

Economy
  - Income class: 1st municipal income class
  - Poverty incidence: 19.82% (2023)
  - Revenue: ₱ 587 million (2024)
  - Assets: ₱ 1,433 million (2024)
  - Expenditure: ₱ 59.83 million (2024)
  - Liabilities: ₱ 313 million (2024)

Service provider
  - Electricity: Oriental Mindoro Electric Cooperative (ORMECO)
  - Telecommunications: PLDT
- Time zone: UTC+8 (PST)
- ZIP code: 5204
- PSGC: 1705208000
- IDD : area code: +63 (0)43
- Native languages: Alangan; Tagalog
- Feast Date: September 10
- Patron saint: San Nicolas de Tolentino

Naujan (Filipino pronunciation: [naʔuˈhan]), officially the Municipality of Naujan (Tagalog: Bayan ng Naujan), is a municipality in the province of Oriental Mindoro, Philippines. According to the 2024 census, it has a population of 109,122 people.

It is famous for the fifth largest lake in the Philippines the Naujan Lake.

== History ==
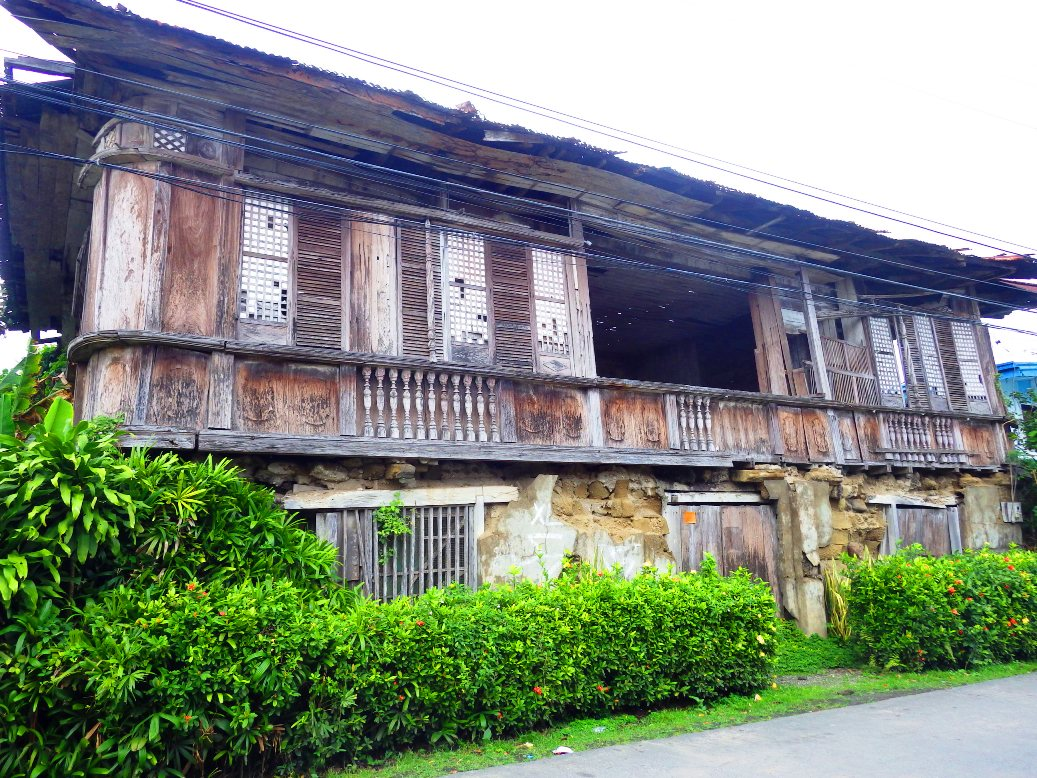
An ancestral house in Naujan

The town of Naujan was established in 1639 under a Royal decree issued by King Phillip of Spain. Prior to the arrival of the Spaniards, traces of an earlier civilization existed, as evidenced by the unearthed artifacts of Chinese origin dating from the Sung, Yuan, and the Ming dynasties in barangays of Dao and San Jose. This reinforces the theory that the natives of Naujan have trade relations with the Chinese during those early years. Its name according to legend, came from the word, “nauhaw”, or “went thirsty”.

Still, the Mangyans that are of malayan descent are known to be the first inhabitants and were just pushed to the interior mountanous area due to the arrival of Christian settlers. They currently reside in the reservation areas of Barangays Metolza, Caburo, Balite, Paitan, Magtibay and Banuton.

In the 17th century, a Recollect priest built a church in Barrio Bancuro with walls made of stone. This served as the house of worship and at the same time as a fort and a place of refuge against the Moro invaders. However in 1824, the Moros were able to conquer them and burned the fort. The 1800s census showed that Naujan had 924 native families and 6 Spanish-Filipino families.

In 1898, the Moro raids ceased and the settlement was transferred to Matandang Naujan commonly known as Lumangbayan along the seacoast. At that time, the rebellion against Spanish rule started to break out in Mindoro.

Naujan has its on share of revolutionaries. Francisco Manalaysay had his own insurrectionary forces against the Spaniards. Captain Valeriano Gasic was then the Presidente del Municipal of Naujan. He went underground when the Americans started to rule Mindoro and declared him “tulisan”. He was eventually captured and was sentenced to life imprisonment. This was later commuted to five years in exile in the island of Culion, Palawan where he died.

The guerilla movement against the Japanese Occupation was headed by Esteban Beloncio, Felix Boquio and Gomersindo Dela Torre. During the Martial Law years, Father Ed Dela Torre was the prominent son of Naujan who actively fought the dictatorship.

== Geography ==
Naujan Lake

It covers a land area of 52,804.15 hectares (130,481.9 acres), making it the largest municipality in the province and accounting for 12% of the province's total land area. Naujan is 26 kilometres (16 mi) from Calapan. The town is bounded in the north of Calapan, in the northwest by the municipality of Baco, in the east by part of the Verde Island Passage and Tablas Strait, in the south by the town of Victoria, in the southeast by the town of Pola and in the southwest by the town of Sablayan, province of Occidental Mindoro.

The town of Naujan is a First-Class municipality and partially urban, has a population of roughly more than 109,122 people from 70 barangays according to a recent PSA 2024 Census of Population report, has all the amenities of a town of its size. It has its own Town Plaza and its own Conference Center. It is also the home of the newly built Oriental Mindoro Sports Complex located in Barangay Santiago.

On January 4, 1905, under Act 1280, Naujan was recognized as a full-pledged municipality while its boundaries were permanently established in 1919.

=== Barangays ===
Map showing administrative divisions of Naujan, Oriental Mindoro

Naujan is politically subdivided into 71 barangays. Each barangay consists of puroks and some have sitios.

- Adrialuna
- Andres Ylagan (Mag-asawang Tubig)
- Antipolo (Parusan)
- Apitong
- Arangin
- Aurora
- Bacungan
- Bagong Buhay
- Balite
- Bancuro
- Banuton
- Barcenaga
- Bayani
- Buhangin
- Caburo
- Concepcion
- Dao
- Del Pilar
- Estrella
- Evangelista
- Gamao
- General Esco
- Herrera
- Inarawan
- Kalinisan
- Laguna (Balansig)
- Mabini
- Magtibay
- Mahabang Parang
- Malabo
- Malaya
- Malinao
- Malvar
- Masagana
- Masaguing
- Melgar A (San Jose Dos)
- Melgar B (San Jose Dos)
- Metolza
- Montelago (Pungao)
- Montemayor (Lugta)
- Motoderazo
- Mulawin
- Nag-Iba I
- Nag-Iba II
- Pagkakaisa
- Paitan
- Paniquian
- Pinagsabangan I
- Pinagsabangan II
- Pinahan
- Poblacion I (Barangay I)
- Poblacion II (Barangay II)
- Poblacion III (Barangay III)
- Sampaguita
- San Agustin I
- San Agustin II (Ilaya)
- San Andres
- San Antonio
- San Carlos
- San Isidro (Calaguimay)
- San Jose (San Jose Uno)
- San Luis
- San Nicolas
- San Pedro
- Santa Cruz
- Santa Isabel (Mapantat)
- Santa Maria
- Santiago
- Santo Nino
- Tagumpay
- Tigkan

=== Climate ===
Climate data for Naujan, Oriental Mindoro
Month	Jan	Feb	Mar	Apr	May	Jun	Jul	Aug	Sep	Oct	Nov	Dec	Year
Mean daily maximum °C (°F)	28 (82)	29 (84)	30 (86)	31 (88)	31 (88)	30 (86)	29 (84)	29 (84)	29 (84)	29 (84)	29 (84)	28 (82)	29 (85)
Mean daily minimum °C (°F)	22 (72)	21 (70)	22 (72)	23 (73)	25 (77)	25 (77)	25 (77)	25 (77)	25 (77)	24 (75)	23 (73)	22 (72)	24 (74)
Average precipitation mm (inches)	48 (1.9)	32 (1.3)	41 (1.6)	54 (2.1)	257 (10.1)	410 (16.1)	466 (18.3)	422 (16.6)	429 (16.9)	300 (11.8)	137 (5.4)	92 (3.6)	2,688 (105.7)
Average rainy days	10.8	8.0	9.8	11.7	23.1	27.5	29.2	28.7	28.7	25.5	18.2	12.8	234
Source: Meteoblue

== Demographics ==
Population census of Naujan
Year	Pop.	±% p.a.
1903	3,662	—
1918	9,139	+6.29%
1939	19,170	+3.59%
1948	22,382	+1.74%
1960	31,476	+2.88%
1970	45,685	+3.79%
1975	54,641	+3.66%
1980	61,216	+2.30%
1990	72,203	+1.66%
1995	75,726	+0.90%
2000	83,892	+2.22%
2007	90,629	+1.07%
2010	94,497	+1.53%
2015	102,998	+1.65%
2020	109,587	+1.31%
2024	109,122	−0.10%
Source: Philippine Statistics Authority

== Economy ==
Poverty incidence of Naujan (%)

Source: Philippine Statistics Authority

== Government ==
28th Sangguniang Bayan Elected Officials (2025):

- Municipal Mayor: Kgg. Henry Joel C. Teves
- Vice Mayor: Kgg. Candido J. Melgar Jr.
- Sangguniang Bayan Members:
  - Kgg. Keneth Wilson A. Viray, Councilor
  - Kgg. Jun S. Bugarin, Councilor
  - Kgg. Marion Francis F. Marcos, Councilor
  - Kgg. Joefel C. Ylagan, Councilor
  - Kgg. Elmar B. De Villa, Councilor
  - Kgg. Allan M. Balbacal, Councilor
  - Kgg. Michael Gregory D. Vargas, Councilor
  - Kgg. Princess Patricia Mhey R. Dolor, Councilor
  - Kgg. Ralph Jonnel C. Recto, Liga ng mga Barangay Provincial Federation President
  - Kgg. Pedro M. Aday, Liga ng mga Barangay Vice President
  - Kgg. Christian Kent C. Nagutom, SK Municipal Federation President
  - Kgg. Rogelio P. Banlugan, Indigenous Peoples Mandatory Representative

== Education ==
Naujan Academy

There are three schools district offices which govern all educational institutions within the municipality. They oversee the management and operations of all private and public, from primary to secondary schools.

These are the Naujan East Schools District, Naujan South Schools District, and Naujan West Schools District.

=== Naujan East District ===
==== Public & Private Elementary ====
- Agustin Gutierrez Memorial Academy, Inc
- Antipolo Elementary School
- Bancuro Elementary School
- Concepcion Elementary School
- Francisco Melgar Memorial School
- Francisco Tria Memorial School
- Jose L. Basa Memorial School
- Julian Ylagan Memorial School
- Kalinisan Elementary School
- Leon Garong Memorial School
- Macapili Elementary School
- Mariano P. Garcia Memorial School
- Mariano P. Leuterio Memorial School
- Marivic Mortel Cusi MMC Montessori, Inc.
- Masaging Elementary School
- Mena G. Valencia Memorial School
- Montelago Elementary School
- Nag-Iba I Elementary School
- Nag-Iba II Elementary School
- Naujan Academy, Inc.
- San Antonio Elementary School
- Santiago Elementary School
- Tigbao Elementary School
- Tito B. Herrera Memorial Elementary School

==== Public & Private Secondary ====
- Bacungan High School
- Masaguing National High School
- Melgar National High School
- Naujan Academy, Inc.
- Naujan Municipal High School
- Tigbao High School

=== Naujan South District ===
==== Public & Private Elementary ====
- Aurora Central School
- Bagong Buhay Elementary School
- Bagong Pag-Asa Primary School
- Balite Mangyan School
- Bucayao Grande Mangyan School
- Bucayao Grande Mangyan School - Annex
- Caburo Mangyan School
- Cornelio Lintawagin Memorial Elementary School
- Del Pilar Elementary School
- Del Pilar Elementary School - Annex
- Evangelista Elementary School
- Ezer School of Naujan, Inc.
- Inarawan Elementary School
- Karumagit Elementary School
- Leticia Medrano Cacha Elementary School
- Mabini Elementary School
- Mahabang Parang Elementary School
- Malvar Elementary School
- Masagana Elementary School
- Metolza Elementary School
- Mulawin Elementary School
- Panikian Elementary School
- San Andres Elementary School
- San Carlos Elementary School
- San Luis Elementary School
- Saturnino E. Gomez Memorial Elementary School
- Sido Mangyan School
- Sto. Niño Elementary School
- Tagumpay Elementary School
- Tigkan Elementary School
- Tipas Mangyan School
- Tugdaan Mangyan Center for Learning and Development

==== Public & Private Secondary ====
- Apitong National High School
- Aurora National High School
- Evangelista National High School
- Inarawan National High School
- Malvar National High School
- San Agustin National High School

=== Naujan West District ===
==== Public & Private Elementary ====
- Adrialuna Elementary School
- B. Aguilon Elementary School
- Bacungan Elementary School
- Buhangin Elementary School
- Dao Elementary School
- Don Vicente Delgado Memorial Elementary School
- Eufracio Carmona Elementary School
- Gamao Elementary School
- Joaquin G. Hernandez Elementary School
- Juan Luna Memorial Elementary School
- Laguna Elementary School
- Macangas Elementary School
- Malinao Elementary School
- Manuel R. Marcos Sr. Elementary School
- Petra Garis Memorial Elementary School
- Pinagsabangan I Elementary School
- Piñahan Elementary School
- Porfirio G. Comia Memorial Elementary School
- Sampaguita Elementary School
- San Isidro Elementary School
- San Nicolas Elementary School
- San Pedro Elementary School
- Santiago Garong Memorial School

==== Public & Private Secondary ====
- Doroteo S. Mendoza Sr. Memorial National High School
- Laguna National High School
- Porfirio G. Comia Memorial National High School

== See also ==
- List of Cultural Properties of the Philippines in Naujan, Oriental Mindoro
- Naujan Lake
