= Oriental Mindoro =

Province in Mimaropa, Philippines

- Province
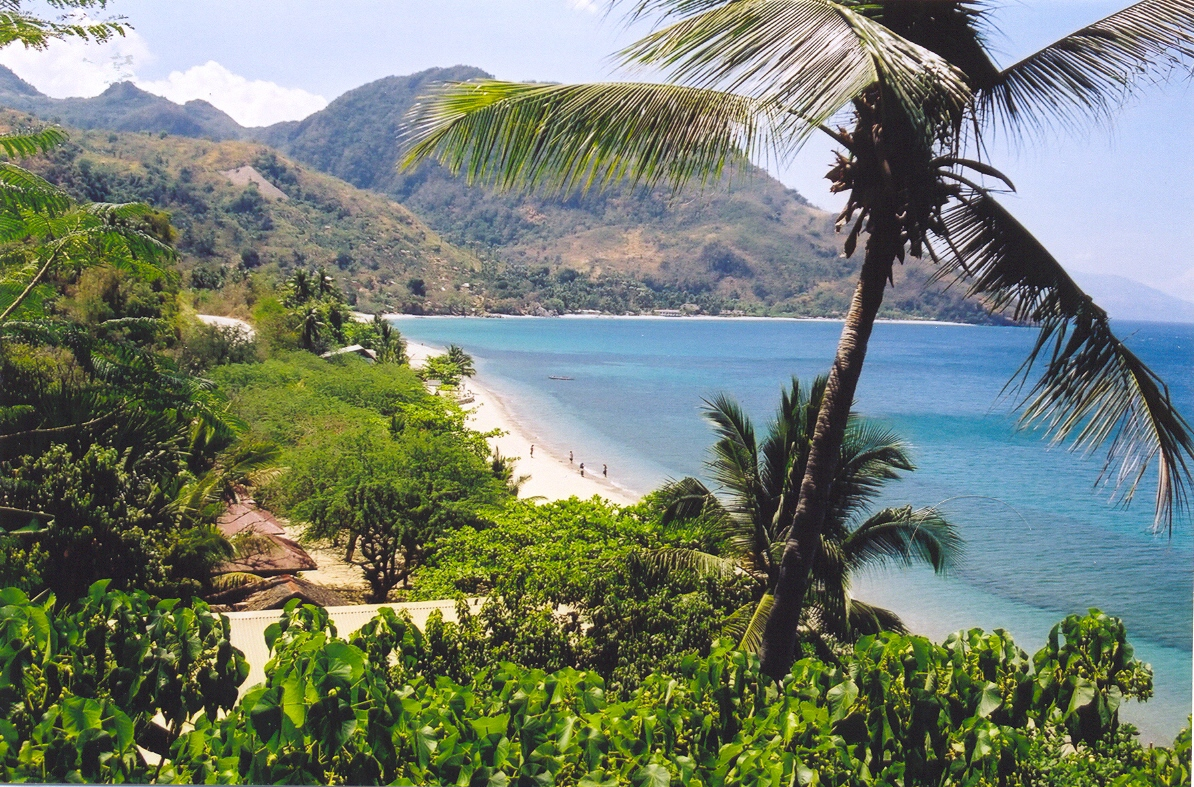
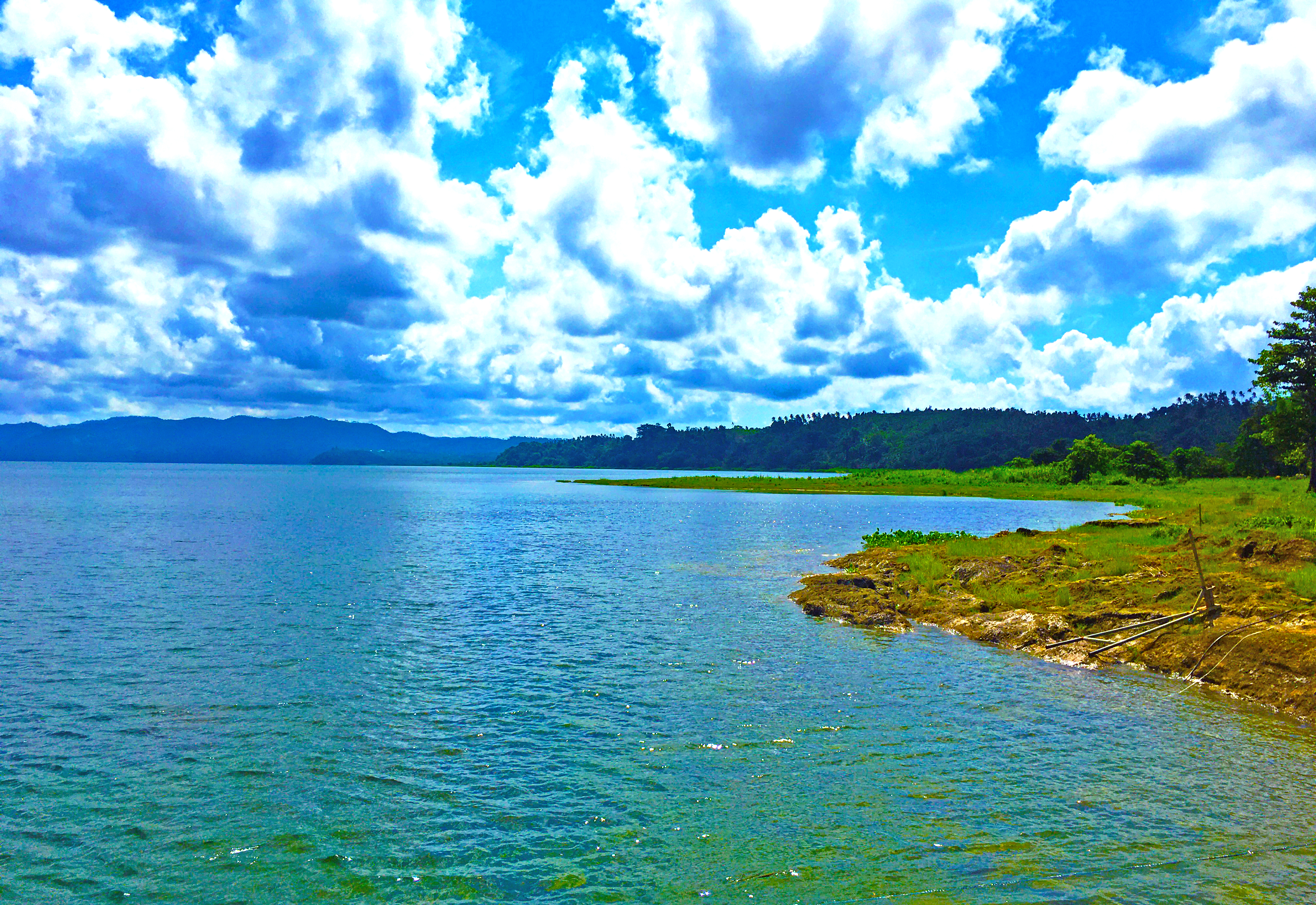
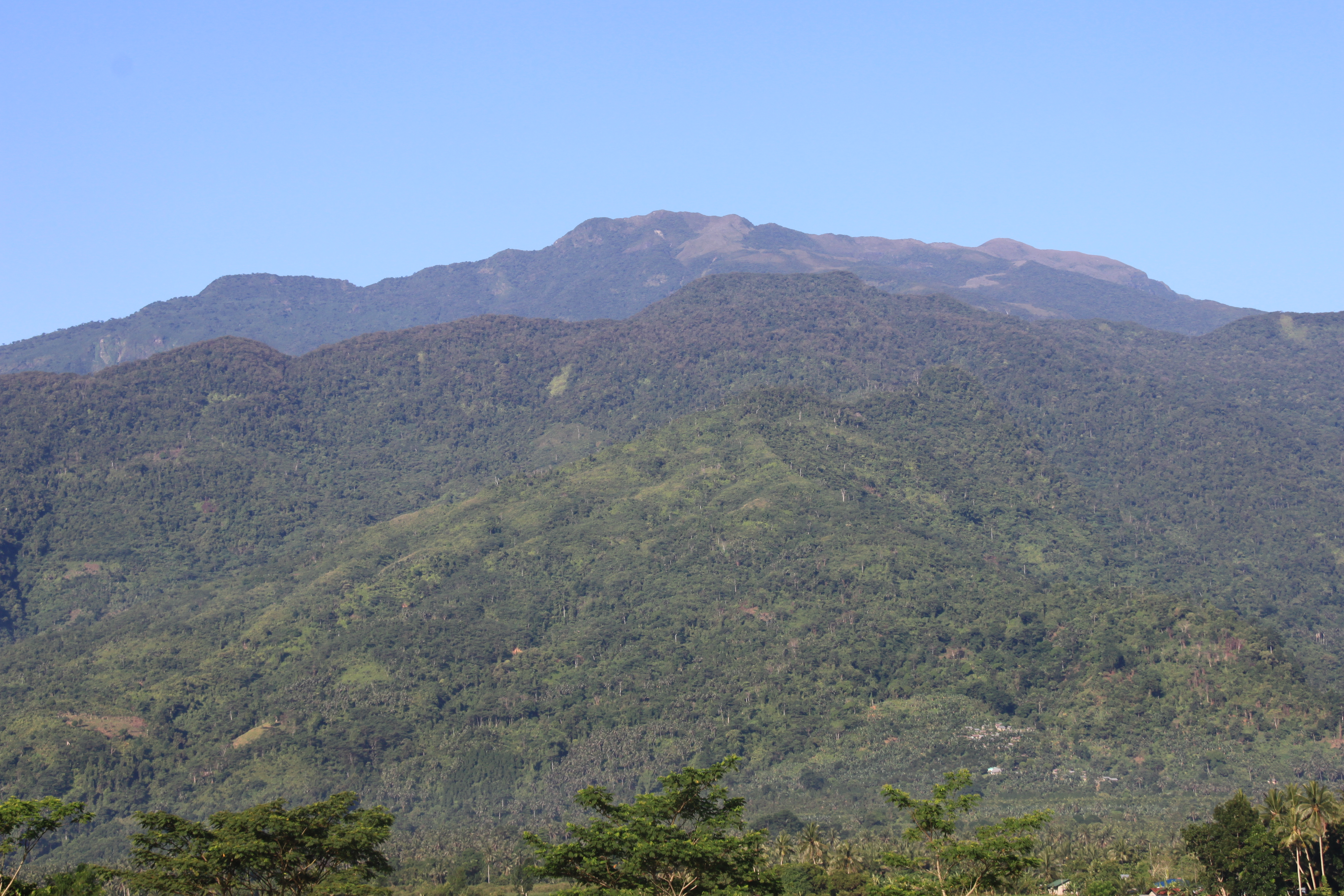
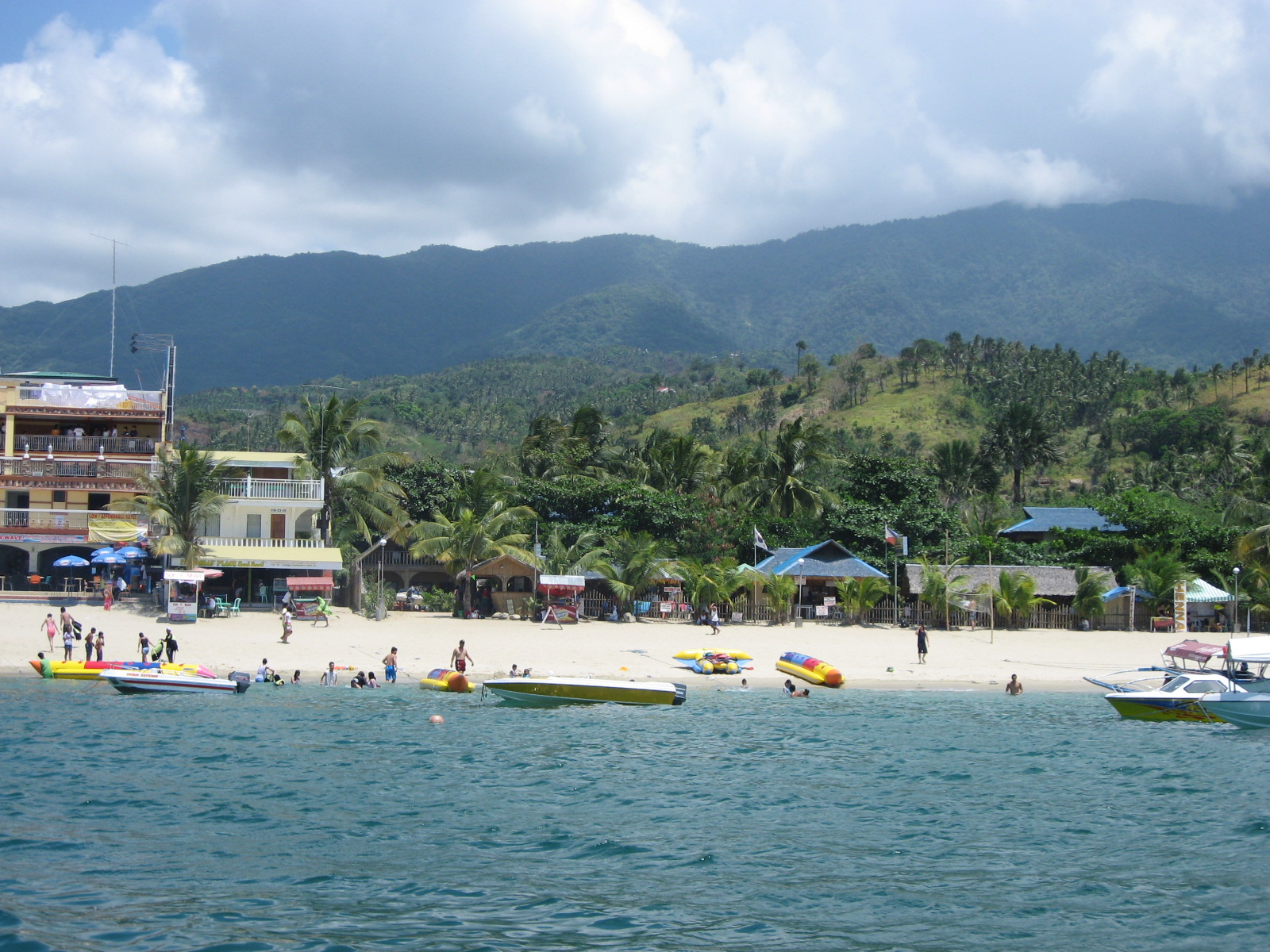
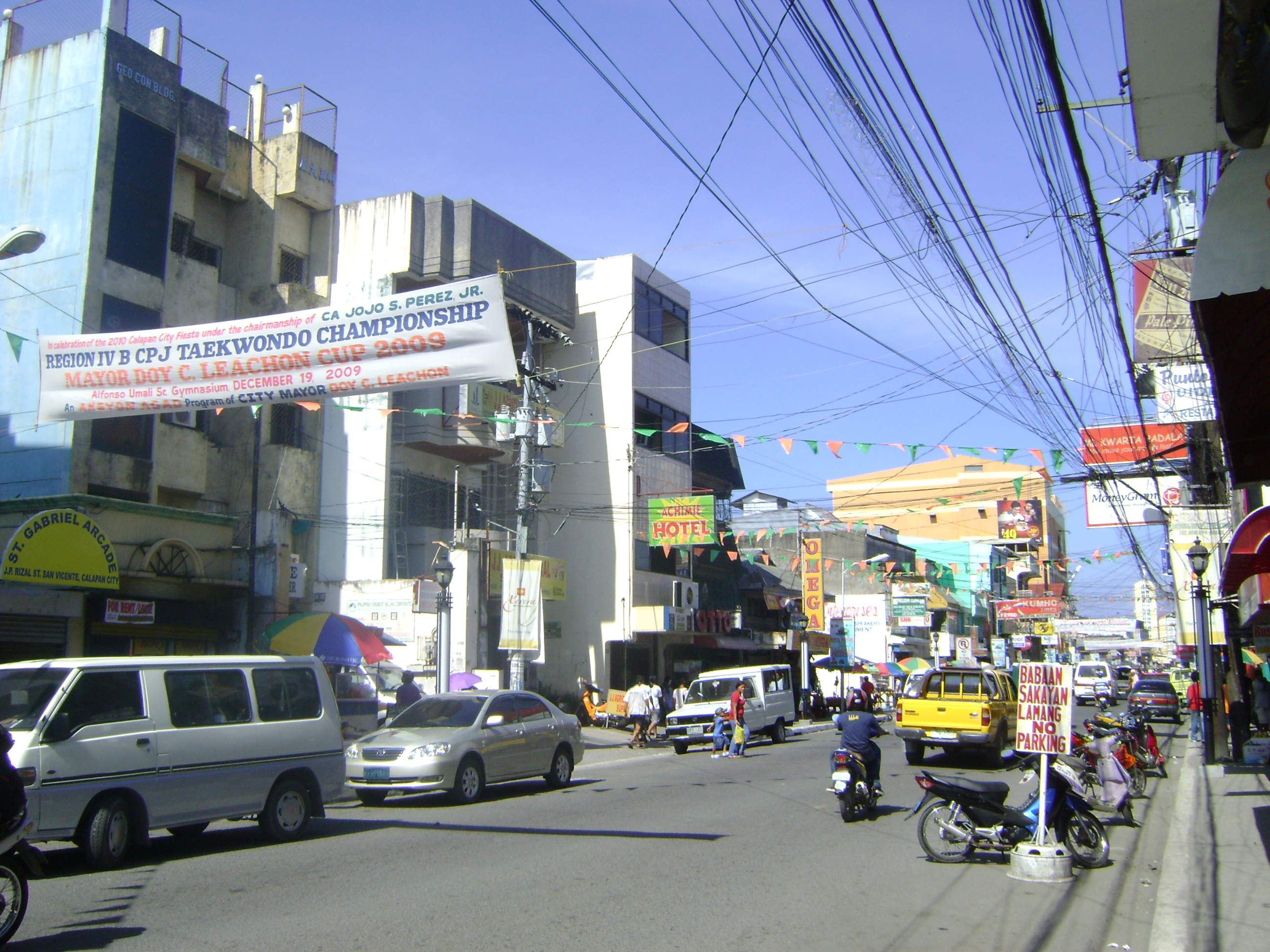
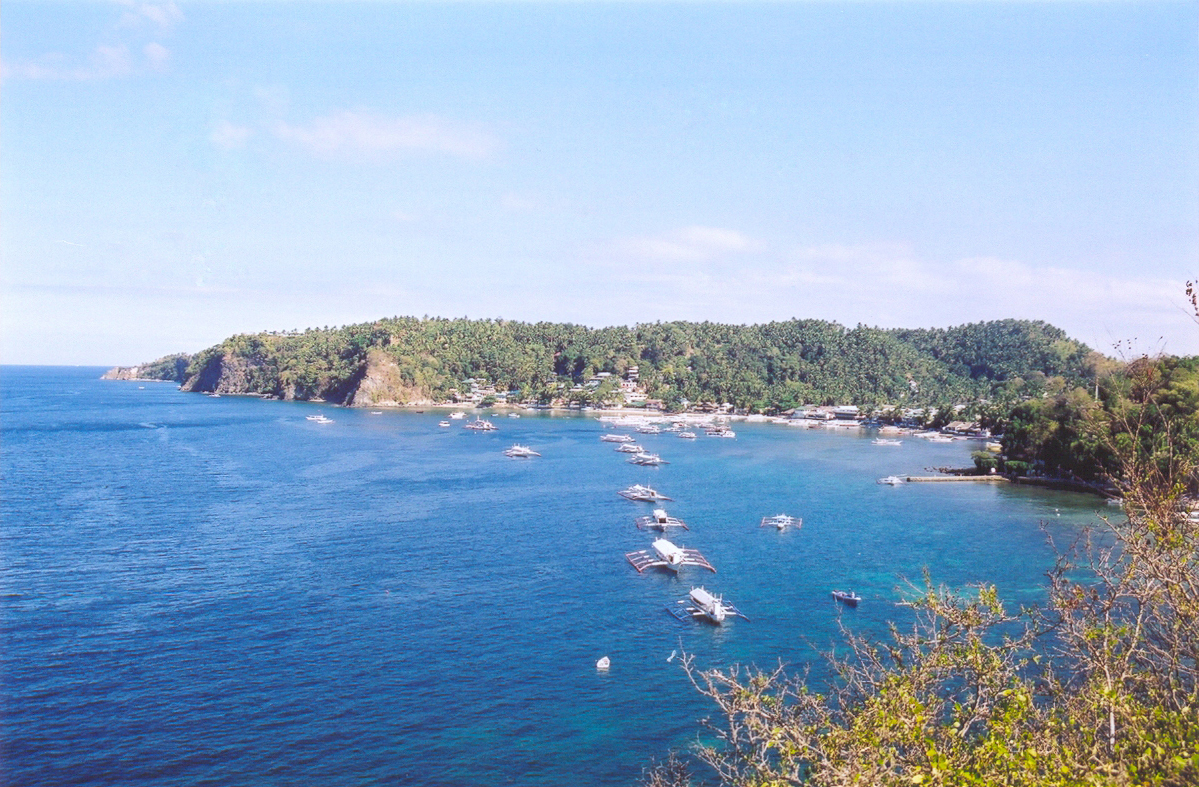
- (From top: left to right) Puerto Galera, Lake Naujan, Mount Halcon, Puerto Galera white beach, Calapan and Sabang Bay.

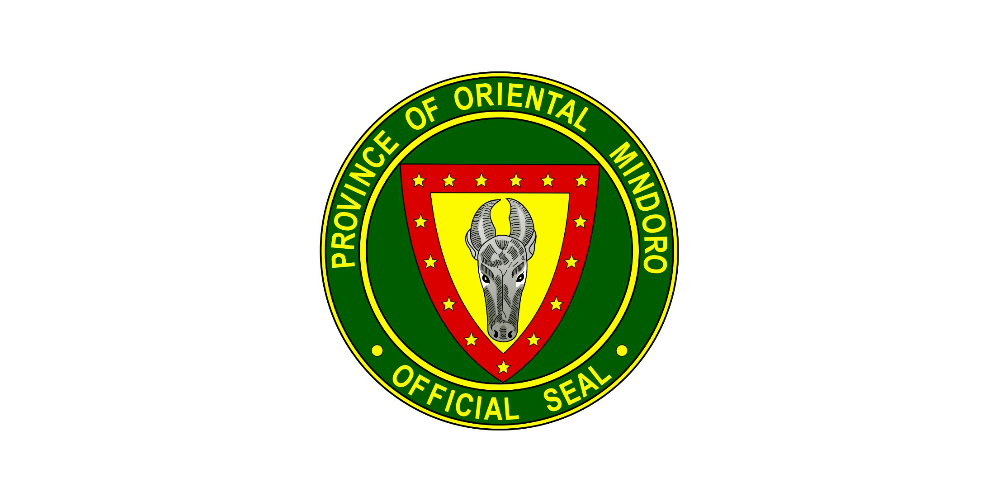
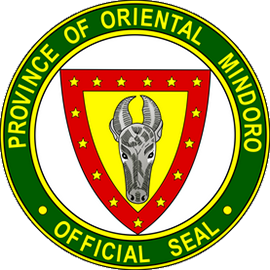
- Flag Seal
- Anthem: Martsa ng Silangang Mindoro (Oriental Mindoro March)
- Location in the Philippines
- Interactive map of Oriental Mindoro
- Coordinates: 13°00′N 121°25′E
- Country: Philippines
- Region: Mimaropa
- Founded: November 15, 1950
- Capital and largest city: Calapan

Government
  - Type: Sangguniang Panlalawigan
  - Governor: Humerlito "Bonz" A. Dolor (GSM)
  - Vice Governor: Antonio S. Perez Jr. (MBS)
  - Legislature: Oriental Mindoro Provincial Board
  - Electorate: 569,601 voters (2025)

Area
  - Total: 4,238.38 km^{2} (1,636.45 sq mi)
  - Rank: 28th out of 82
- Highest elevation (Mount Halcon): 2,616 m (8,583 ft)

Population (2024 census)
  - Total: 919,504
  - Rank: 33rd out of 82
  - Density: 216.947/km^{2} (561.890/sq mi)
  - Rank: 47th out of 82
  - Households: 215,076
- Demonyms: Mindoreño; Mindorense

Divisions
  - Independent cities: 0
  - Component cities: 1: Calapan
  - Municipalities: 14: Baco; Bansud; Bongabong; Bulalacao; Gloria; Mansalay; Naujan; Pinamalayan; Pola; Puerto Galera; Roxas; San Teodoro; Socorro; Victoria
  - Barangays: 426
  - Districts: Legislative districts of Oriental Mindoro

Economy
  - Income class: 1st provincial income class
  - Poverty incidence: 14.1% (2023)
  - Revenue: ₱ 3,178 million (2024)
  - Assets: ₱ 11,136 million (2024)
  - Expenditure: ₱ 2,309 million (2024)
  - Liabilities: ₱ 2,462 million (2024)
- Time zone: UTC+8 (PHT)
- PSGC: 175200000
- IDD : area code: +63 (0)43
- ISO 3166 code: PH-MDR
- Spoken languages: Tagalog; Mangyan; English; Karay-a
- Website: www.ormindoro.gov.ph

Oriental Mindoro (Tagalog: Silangang Mindoro), officially the Province of Oriental Mindoro (Tagalog: Lalawigan ng Silangang Mindoro (Oriental Mindoro)), is a province in the Philippines located on the island of Mindoro under Mimaropa region in Luzon, about 140 kilometres (87 mi) southwest of Manila. The province is bordered by the Verde Island Passage and the rest of Batangas to the north, by Marinduque, Maestre de Campo (or known as Sibale but official name is Concepcion) Island, Tablas Strait and the rest of Romblon to the east, by Semirara and the rest of Caluya Islands, Antique to the south, and by Occidental Mindoro to the west. Its provincial capital Calapan, the only city in the island, is the most-populous in the province, and Mimaropa's regional center.

Oriental Mindoro is touted as the country's emerging eco-tourism destination. In 2005, the Philippines was found to be the center of marine fish biodiversity and the home of the most diverse marine ecosystem in the world, by American biologists Kent Carpenter and Victor Springer. Most of the endemic species in the Philippines are found in the Verde Island Passage between Mindoro island and the main island of Luzon. The passage houses 2,983 individual species of algae, corals, crustaceans, mollusks, fishes, marine reptiles, and marine mammals, based on a study conducted by Carpenter and Springer in 2005.

UNESCO declared Puerto Galera a biosphere reserve under its Man and the Biosphere Programme in the 1970s. The Verde Island Passage is at the apex of the so-called Coral Triangle – the Philippines, Indonesia, and Malaysia – which has the distinction of being the "center of the center of the world's marine biodiversity" and the "center of the center of marine shorefish biodiversity".

== History ==
=== Japanese occupation ===
A Japanese force landed on northeastern Mindoro in the Philippine Islands on 27 February 1942.

Almost three years later, after the invasion of Mindoro by Allied forces, they proceeded to land to Bongabong and heading to and capturing Calapan, the capital of the united Mindoro Province at the time on 24 January 1945.

=== Philippine independence ===
==== Foundation ====
After World War II, reconstruction and rehabilitation of infrastructure and the economy took place on the island, which then constituted a single province. This was partitioned on 13 June 1950 into Oriental Mindoro and Occidental Mindoro by virtue of Republic Act No. 505.

In the decades after the War, Mindoro attracted settlers from overpopulated provinces in the Philippines. Apart from the hope to become landowners or to have better tenancy conditions, the Hukbalahap Rebellion in Central Luzon was an important factor for migration. Under the settlement program of the National Resettlement and Rehabilitation Administration (NARRA) founded in 1954, families from Central Luzon were settled in the Bongabong-Pinamalayan area. This project ended in 1956 after 606 families (3,636 people) were settled on 8,600 hectares (21,000 acres) of public land. Since then, new settlers have continued to migrate to Mindoro until today.

=== Contemporary ===
On November 15, 1994, a magnitude 7.1 earthquake struck the Verde Island Passage located north of Oriental Mindoro, killing 69 people in the province, with most casualties due to the tsunami caused by the earthquake. Within a year after the calamity, however, the provincial government under Governor Rodolfo G. Valencia was able to successfully rehabilitate the province in a brisk manner, and was thus conferred the Disaster Management Award by the National Disaster Coordinating Council in July 1995.

The island currently sees an ongoing conflict between the Armed Forces of the Philippines and insurgents. On March 6, 2010, eleven soldiers were killed and seven were hurt in a gun battle with the New People's Army in Mansalay, Oriental Mindoro.

== Geography ==
Oriental Mindoro covers a total area of 4,238.38 square kilometres (1,636.45 sq mi) occupying the eastern section of Mindoro island in Mimaropa region. The province is bordered by the Verde Island Passage to the north, by Marinduque, Maestre de Campo, Tablas Strait and the rest of Romblon to the east, by Semirara and the rest of Caluya Islands, Antique to the south, and by Occidental Mindoro to the west.

Administrative divisions of Oriental Mindoro

The western portion of the province is mountainous or rugged, while the east has hills and flood plains. Mount Halcon, standing 2,582 metres (8,471 ft) above sea level, is the 18th highest mountain in the country and is the province's and island's highest peak. Lake Naujan, the fifth largest lake in the country with an area of approximately 8,125 hectares (20,080 acres) of open water, is located in the northeastern part of the island and the province.

=== Administrative divisions ===
Oriental Mindoro comprises 14 municipalities, with one city, Calapan serving as the provincial capital.

- † Provincial capital and component city
- Municipality

City or municipality^{[A]}		District	Population			±% p.a.	Area		Density		Barangay	Coordinates^{[B]}
			(2020)		(2015)		km^{2}	sq mi	/km^{2}	/sq mi		
Baco		1st	4.4%	39,817	37,215	1.30%	216.23	83.49	180	470	27	13°21′29″N 121°05′47″E
Bansud		2nd	4.7%	42,671	40,992	0.77%	343.47	132.61	120	310	13	12°51′37″N 121°27′22″E
Bongabong		2nd	8.5%	76,973	72,073	1.26%	498.20	192.36	150	390	36	12°44′43″N 121°29′12″E
Bulalacao (San Pedro)		2nd	4.9%	44,366	39,107	2.43%	321.86	124.27	140	360	15	12°19′31″N 121°20′37″E
Calapan	†	1st	16.0%	145,786	133,893	1.63%	250.06	96.55	580	1,500	62	13°24′25″N 121°10′40″E
Gloria		2nd	5.6%	50,496	45,073	2.19%	245.52	94.80	210	540	27	12°58′12″N 121°28′40″E
Mansalay		2nd	6.5%	59,114	54,533	1.55%	446.62	172.44	130	340	17	12°31′11″N 121°26′18″E
Naujan		1st	12.1%	109,587	102,998	1.19%	503.10	194.25	220	570	70	13°19′27″N 121°18′11″E
Pinamalayan		2nd	10.0%	90,383	86,172	0.91%	282.26	108.98	320	830	37	13°02′19″N 121°28′48″E
Pola		1st	3.9%	35,455	34,701	0.41%	159.34	61.52	220	570	23	13°08′37″N 121°26′30″E
Puerto Galera		1st	4.6%	41,961	36,606	2.63%	247.85	95.70	170	440	13	13°30′06″N 120°57′15″E
Roxas		2nd	6.5%	58,849	53,201	1.94%	85.26	32.92	690	1,800	20	12°35′23″N 121°31′00″E
San Teodoro		1st	2.1%	19,121	17,904	1.26%	341.00	131.66	56	150	8	13°26′11″N 121°01′12″E
Socorro		1st	4.6%	41,585	39,099	1.18%	151.38	58.45	270	700	26	13°03′22″N 121°24′22″E
Victoria		1st	5.7%	52,175	50,492	0.63%	146.23	56.46	360	930	32	13°10′24″N 121°16′43″E
Total				908,339	844,059	0.52%	4,238.38	1,636.45	210	540	426	(see GeoGroup box)
1. Former names are italicized.; 2. Coordinates mark the city/town center, and are sortable by latitude.

=== Climate ===
Oriental Mindoro has no distinct wet or dry season. Average temperature ranges from 28 to 32 °C (82 to 90 °F). The province experiences maximum rainfall during the months of June to September. Relative humidity is registered at 87%.

== Demographics ==
Population census of Oriental Mindoro
Year	Pop.	±% p.a.
1903	26,359	—
1918	43,738	+3.43%
1939	92,530	+3.63%
1948	124,556	+3.36%
1960	228,998	+5.20%
1970	328,364	+3.67%
1975	388,744	+3.44%
1980	446,938	+2.83%
1990	550,049	+2.10%
1995	608,616	+1.91%
2000	681,818	+2.46%
2007	735,769	+1.06%
2010	785,602	+2.41%
2015	844,059	+1.38%
2020	908,339	+1.56%
2024	919,504	+0.29%
Source: Philippine Statistics Authority

The population of Oriental Mindoro in the 2024 census was 919,504 people, with a density of 220 inhabitants per square kilometre or 570 inhabitants per square mile.

The province is largely rural, with 70% of the population engaged in agriculture and fishing and with only 30% living in urban centers.

=== Languages ===
Tagalog and English are widely spoken in the province. Tagalog is usually spoken with Batangas dialect both due to its geographical contact with Batangas and Batangueño residents in the province, although it has been greatly influenced by the native Mangyan and Visayan languages, creating another unique dialect. Other languages spoken are Ilocano, Bicolano, Kapampangan, Maranao, Maguindanaon, Tausug and Cebuano, to varying degrees by their respective communities within the province. Dialects of the Mangyan language are Arayan, Alagnan, Buhid, Hanunoo, and Tadyawan. People from the southern part can understand Hiligaynon and Karay-a due to its closeness facing Panay.

=== Religion ===
A very large portion of the population are of Roman Catholic conviction (81%). Other Christian and Islamic beliefs constitute most of the remaining religious affiliations in the province. Other populations practice indigenous Philippine folk religions, animism, or atheism.

=== Indigenous people ===
The indigenous people of Oriental Mindoro are the Mangyans (Manguianes in Spanish, Mañguianes in Old Tagalog), consisting of seven distinct tribes. They occupy the interior, especially the highlands. Mangyans have inhabited the island since pre-history. They are believed to have originally traveled from Indonesia and settled down for good on the island.

== Economy ==
Poverty incidence of Oriental Mindoro (%)

Source: Philippine Statistics Authority

Oriental Mindoro's rich and arable land is suitable for agriculture. It produces large quantities of rice, corn, coconut, vegetables and fruits like calamansi, banana, rambutan, marang or uloy, lanzones and durian. For that, Oriental Mindoro is also known as the Rice Granary and Fruit Basket of Southern Tagalog. It still is the Banana King and Calamansi King of the region. Its total agricultural area is 169,603.34 hectares (419,099.0 acres). Based on agricultural statistics, 85,244 hectares (210,640 acres) are devoted to palay production while 21,671 hectares (53,550 acres)s to coconut plantation. For 2019, the province has been one of the top producers of rice becoming a source of rice for the National Food Authority's rice procurement target.

== Tourist attractions ==
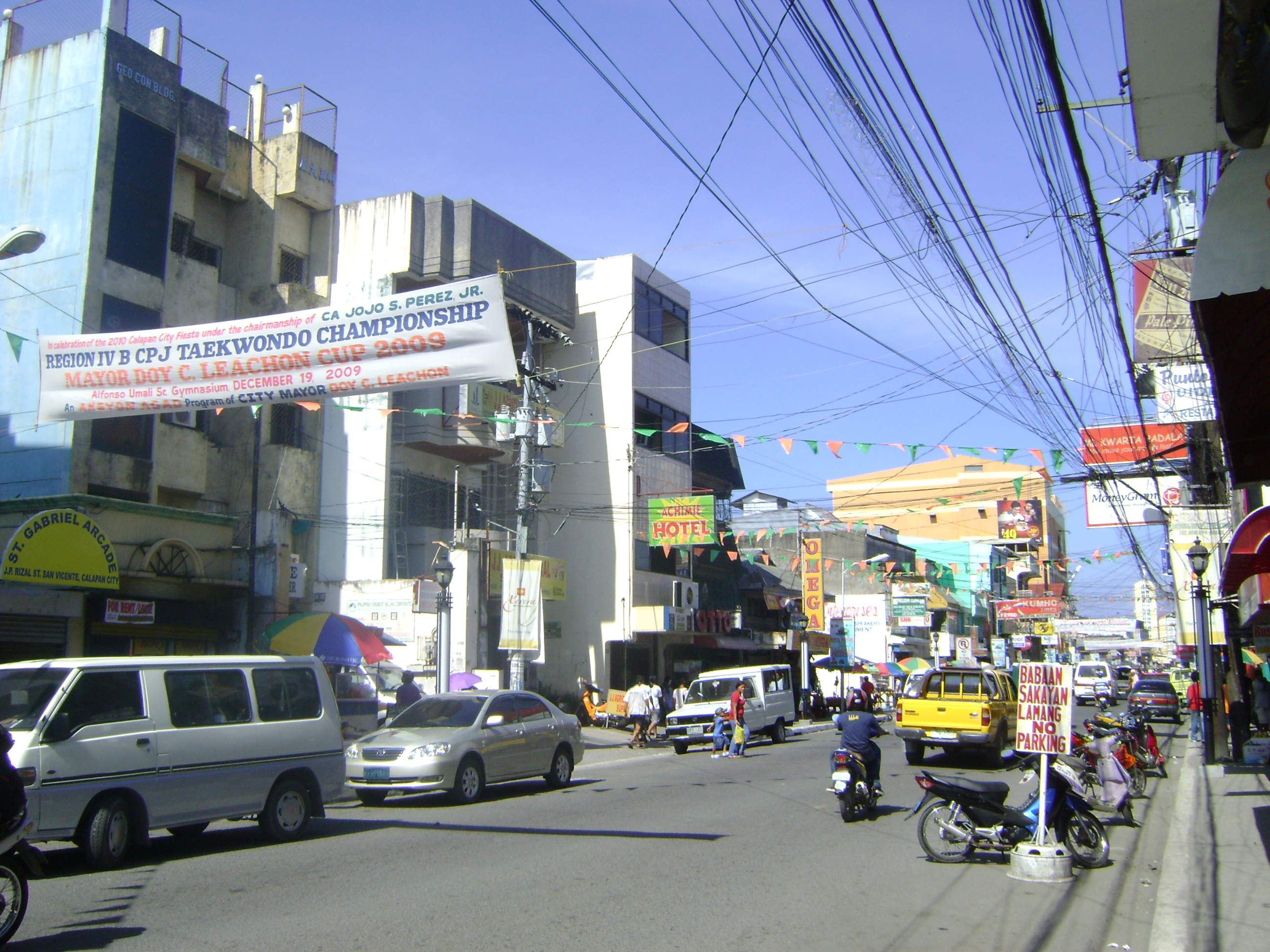
Calapan in the northeast of Mindoro Island is the capital and largest city in the province.

Access from Luzon via the Batangas ports mostly goes through the Verde Island Passage to reach Puerto Galera, the key entry point to Oriental Mindoro. In November 2004, Puerto Galera was voted a member of the UNESCO-affiliated ‘The Club of the Most Beautiful Bays in the World. Puerto Galera features a natural harbor which also protects ships, yachts and bancas from strong typhoons sweeping in from the Pacific.

Puerto Galera, known for its white sand beaches and the accompanying honky tonk bar scene on some key beaches, is known for its dive sites with a biodiversity of marine life in and around the coral reefs. Underwater rock formations and coral gardens are home to a variety of marine life, which include numerous species of nudibranch, mantis shrimp, sea anemone, moray and sea fan sea horses. The seas off the coast are host to passing dolphin pods and even the rarer whale shark, and are part of the migratory small whale route from the Visayas.

Towering 8,488 feet (2,587 m) above sea level, Mount Halcon in Baco, is a popular mountain climbing destination. Local and migratory birds allow birdwatching activities. The province is home to endemic wildlife like the tamaraw, a straight-horned water buffalo.

Other tourist destinations include:

=== Hidden Paradise ===
The attraction consists of a natural spring with a swimming pool and picnic cottages. It is located in Baco, and can be reached in 45 minutes by taking a jeepney bound for the Calapan market.

=== Alibatan Island ===
The island measures 5 ha and is noted for its white sand. The place serves as the breeding place of seagulls and turtles. Corals and oysters can be found all around the area. The island is also called "Target Island" because Americans used the island for bombing practice in 1946. It is located in Baco, and can be reached in an hour through a motorized banca from the market square.

=== Buyayao Island ===
It is a rocky island, except for the area facing Buyayao Peninsula. Big snakes called "sobre kama" are found in the mountains. The water around the island is suitable for deep-sea fishing. It is located off the coast of Mansalay, and can be reached in 30 minutes by motorized banca from Mansalay market.

=== Suqui Beach ===
This is a public beach with cottages and other facilities. It is a favorite place for the local people, especially during the summer. It is located in Suqui, Calapan, and can be reached in 15 minutes by taking a tricycle from the town proper.

=== Banilad Beach ===
The place is a good spot for picnicking and swimming, especially during the summer. It is located in Pili, Pinamalayan, and can be reached by taking a jeepney to the port of Barangay Wawa, then an hour's ride by motorized banca to the beach.

=== Bongol Beach ===
It is a secluded beach, with a 2-kilometre (1.2 mi) white sand beach. It is located in Bongol, Pinamalayan, and can be reached in two hours by boarding a Bongol-bound jeepney from the town proper of Pinamalayan and then a tricycle to the beach area.

=== Tamaraw Falls ===
The 423-foot (129 m) waterfalls, situated alongside the road, are actually a series of asymmetrical falls, leading to the grand one, dropping to a frothy waterbed below. The cascading waterfalls are a great attraction to passers-by. Tamaraw Falls is located in Barangay Villaflor, Puerto Galera. It can be reached in two hours by taking a jeepney bound for Barangay Villaflor from Puerto Galera, or Calapan.

=== La Laguna Beach ===
An ideal place for swimming, snorkeling, and scuba diving. There are a number of resorts that offer accommodation and other travel and aqua sports facilities to both domestic and international tourists. It is located in La Laguna, Puerto Galera, and can be reached in 30 minutes from the town proper of Puerto Galera by taking a jeepney bound for La Laguna.

=== Sabang Beach ===
This area is ideal for swimming, snorkeling, and scuba diving. A cluster of nightspots abound in this area, which makes it popular for evening socials. Cottages with entertainment facilities stand close to each other. Low-budget accommodations are available. It is located east of Puerto Galera, and can be reached in 15 minutes from the Puerto Galera pier by taking a jeepney or an outrigger banca.

=== Small La Laguna ===
Contrary to its name, Small La Laguna is bigger than La Laguna, and has more facilities. It has coral reefs, and its water is ideal for snorkeling and scuba diving. There are diving equipment for rent at nearby dive shops. It is located beside Sabang Beach, and can be reached in 20 minutes from the pier by taking a jeepney bound for Sabang.

=== Talipanan Beach ===
This area is not as busy as the other beaches in Puerto Galera. Thus, it is an ideal site for private swimming. It is located in Puerto Galera, and can be reached in 40 minutes by taking a jeepney or an outrigger boat from the town pier.

=== White Sand Beach ===
The white sandy strips of this beach offer excellent opportunities for swimming. Resorts in this area provide entertainment facilities for tourists' greater amusement and leisure. It is located in Barangay San Isidro, Puerto Galera, and is accessible in 30 minutes from the town proper by a jeepney or a boat.

=== Punta Guarda Beach ===
This beach is far from the busy areas of Puerto Galera; thus, it is ideal for those who seek privacy and retreat. It is located in Puerto Galera, Oriental Mindoro, and can be reached by taking a 10-minute jeepney ride from the town proper, to about one kilometer on the beach mark. The remaining distance is covered on foot.

=== Melco Beach ===
It is a beige-colored sandy beach with cottages for rent. It is located in Roxas, Oriental Mindoro, and can be reached in 10 minutes by a banca from the pier.

== Education ==
Higher education institutions in the province:

- Abada College
- ACMCL College
- AMA CLC College of Calapan (ACLC College)
- Baco Community College
- Clarendon College
- CLCC Institute of Computer, Arts & Technology
- Dalubhasaan ng Lungsod ng Calapan (City College of Calapan)
- Divine Word College of Calapan
- Eastern Mindoro College
- Eastern Mindoro Institute of Technology and Sciences
- Erhard Science and Technological Institute - Oriental Mindoro Inc. Archived 13 January 2014 at the Wayback Machine
- Filipino Academy of Scientific Trades
- Grace Mission College
- Innovative College Of Science in Information Technology
- IATEC Computer College
- Institute of Business Science and Medical Arts
- John Paul College
- Luna Goco Colleges
- Mindoro State University
- Mindoro Bible College
- Paradigm College of Science and Technology
- Pinamalayan Maritime Foundation and Technological College, Inc.
- Polytechnic University of the Philippines - Bansud
- Prince of Peace College
- Colegio De Puerto Galera
- Southwestern Institute of Business and Technology
- Southwestern Maritime Institute Foundation
- Saint Augustine Seminary
- Simeon Suan Vocational and Technical college
- St. Anthony College Calapan

== Notable people ==
- Rafael Arenillo Cusi – artist
- Arra San Agustin – Filipina noontime show presenter host of Eat Bulaga! and actress
- Néstor Vicente Madali González – Internationally acclaimed writer and educator
- 3rd Lt. Jose Protacio C. Gozar – Pilot officer with the Philippine Army Air Corps who received the Distinguished Service Cross for his gallantry during the air war at the onset of World War II.
- Jason Francisco – actor, 3rd Placer of Pinoy Big Brother: Double Up
- Karen Reyes – actress, 2nd Big Placer of Pinoy Big Brother: Teen Edition 4
- Charo Santos-Concio – Actress, ex-president of ABS-CBN Corporation, host of Maalaala Mo Kaya
- Col. Pedro A. Serran (USAFFE-AFP) – Son of Isidro and Maxima Serran, born November 26, 1913, in Calapan. Known as the "Liberator of Zarraga," Iloilo Province during World War II. His life-size statue stands on the park named after him in Zarraga.
- Joseph Mercado – Vice President, Polytechnic University of the Philippines
- Jose Antonio N. Carrion – Governor of Marinduque, 2007 – 2010
- Zaijian Jaranilla – Filipino actor and model who has primary allegiance with ABS-CBN Corporation under Star Magic while having secondary ones conditionally with other media companies (GMA Network and TV5 Network) and best known for his role as the orphan Santino in the 2009–2013 ABS-CBN religious-themed teleserye, May Bukas Pa
- Zymic Jaranilla – Zaijian Jaranilla's sibling who originally worked with ABS-CBN briefly and currently a GMA Network contract artist.
- Noli De Castro – journalist, news anchor, 12th Vice President of the Philippines (2004-2010)
- Ejay Falcon – Pinoy Big Brother: Teen Edition Plus big winner, actor, and Oriental Mindoro vice-governor
- Rachel Anne M. Bustamante, a.k.a. Shey Bustamante – Miss Oriental Mindoro 2009, Binibining Pilipinas 2010 Contestant and a Pinoy Big Brother: Teen Clash 2010 Housemate. She is one of the Artist and Talent of Star Magic of ABS-CBN.
