= Tagbanwa (disambiguation) =

The Tagbanwa are an ethnic group of Palawan, Philippines.

Tagbanwa may also refer to:

- Aborlan Tagbanwa language
- Calamian Tagbanwa language
- Central Tagbanwa language
- Tagbanwa alphabet
  - Tagbanwa (Unicode block)

== See also ==
- Tagabawa language, a Manobo language of Davao City and Mount Apo in Mindanao, the Philippines
