= Calamian Islands =

Group of islands in the Philippines

Calamianes
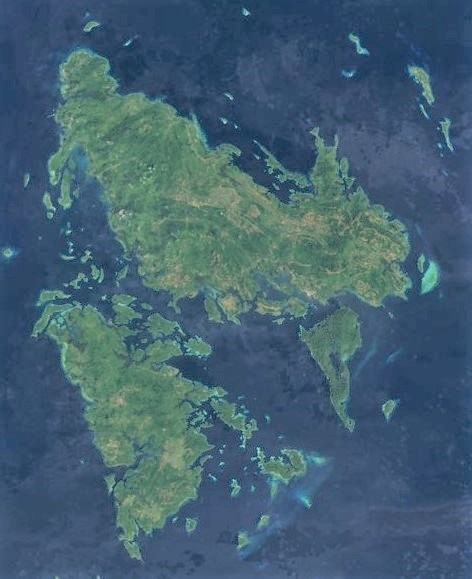
- Calamian islands satellite image captured by Sentinel-2 in 2016

- Location within Palawan

Geography
- Coordinates: 11°54′N 120°14′E
- Adjacent to: Linapacan Strait; Mindoro Strait; South China Sea; Sulu Sea
- Major islands: Busuanga Island; Coron Island; Culion Island; Calauit Island; several other islets

Administration
- Philippines
- Region: Mimaropa
- Province: Palawan

The Calamian Islands or the Calamianes is a group of islands in the province of Palawan, Philippines. The archipelago comprises the islands of Coron, Culion, Busuanga, and Linapacan, along with numerous smaller islands.

== History ==
Historically, before the Spanish came, the Calamianes was part of the nation of Sandao a vassal state of Ma-i at nearby Mindoro. Then, the Calamianes fell to the Brunei and Sulu Sultanates. Eventually, the Calamianes was site of the Spanish politico-militar Provincia de Calamianes. It became the site of a Presidio or a Spanish military garrison, and the small group of islands received, almost 100 Mexican soldier-colonists in the 1670s. The Spanish Empire later purchased mainland Paragua from the Sultan of Borneo. By the end of the 1700s, the Calamianes had 2,289 native families too. In 1818, there were 2 settler Spanish families in Calamanianes. 1 Spanish family were Spaniards from Spain and the other Spanish family were Spaniards born in the Philippines. During the American occupation (1898–1948), the old Provincia de Calamianes was dissolved and jointly administered with the Island of Paragua as the new province of Palawan.

== Geography ==
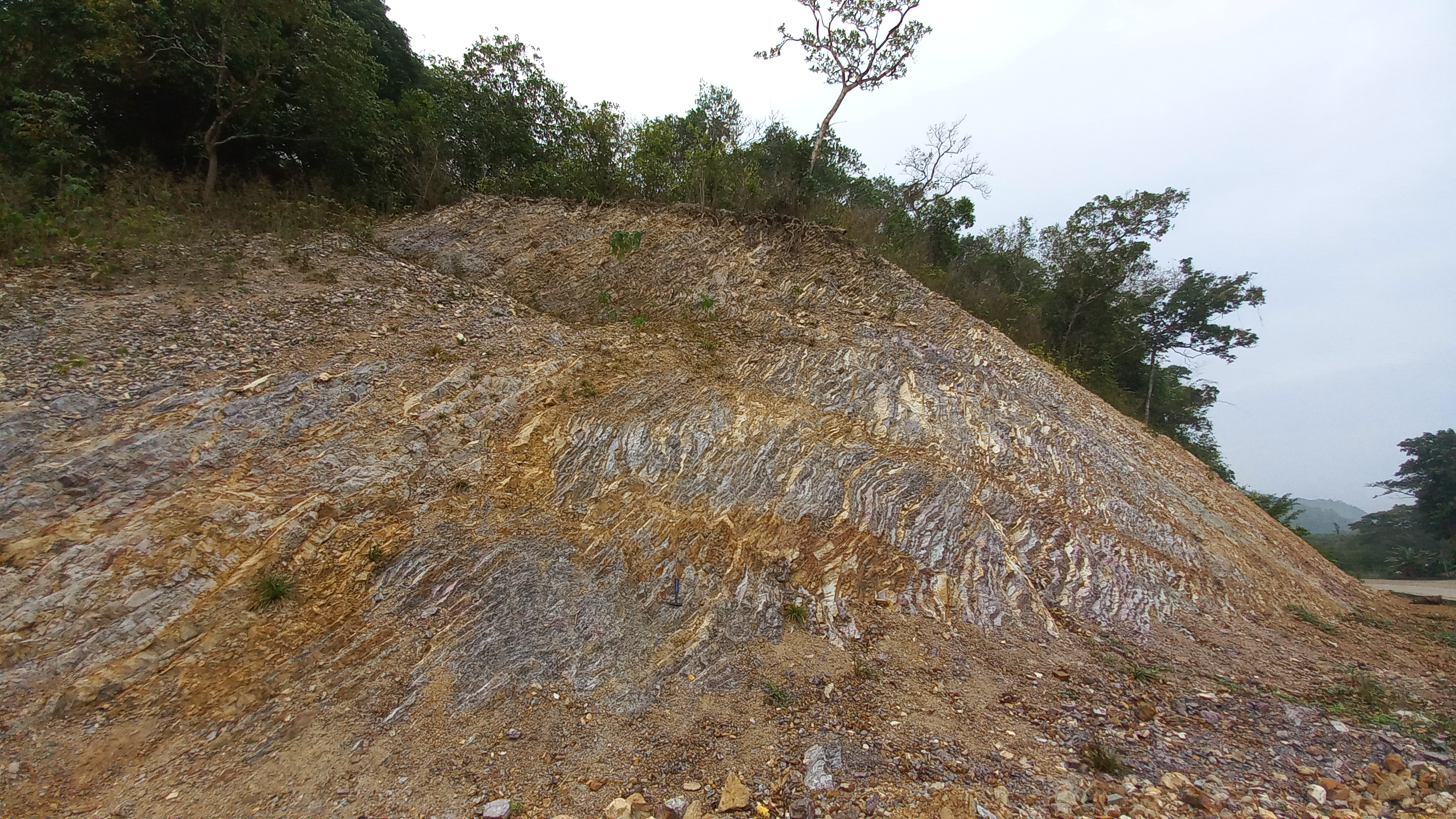
Highly deformed bedded cherts of the Liminangcong chert, exposed in the town of Coron, Busuanga Island

The Calamian Islands span around 680 square miles (1,800 km^{2}) of sea and include major islands such as Coron, Culion, Busuanga, and Linapacan, along with numerous smaller islands. Coron Island, the third-largest, features steep limestone cliffs, karst formations, mangrove forests, and eleven inland lakes. Notable lakes include Kayangan Lake—considered as the cleanest lake in the country—Barracuda Lake, and Lake Cabugao.

Part of the North Palawan Block, a microcontinental fragment characterized by accretionary complexes composed of Upper Paleozoic to Mesozoic sedimentary rocks, including cherts, clastics, and limestones. Busuanga and Culion islands consist mainly of the Liminangcong Formation, a Permian to Late Jurassic chert. This chert forms the distinguishing mountain ranges, with the Middle-Late Jurassic Guinlo Formation clastics forming the valleys on Busuanga.

Calauit Island hosts a wildlife sanctuary originally established in the 1970s by President Ferdinand Marcos to house African species like giraffes and zebras. The park now also supports endemic Philippine fauna including Philippine macaques, wild pigs, hornbills, sea turtles, and dugongs.

== Indigenous communities ==
The Calamian Tagbanwa are an indigenous group distinct from mainland Palawan Tagbanwa. They traditionally lead semi-nomadic, marine-based lives and have legal recognition over ancestral domains, including Coron Island. In 2004, they were granted a Certificate of Ancestral Domain Title covering 24,520 hectares.

The Tagbanwa observe customary laws regulating resource use, including prohibitions on illegal fishing and protection of sacred sites. However, traditional practices face pressure from modernization, migration, and limited government support.
