= Indigenous religious beliefs of the Tagbanwa people =

The indigenous religious beliefs of the Tagbanwa people includes the religious beliefs, mythology and superstitions that has shaped the Tagbanwa way of life. It shares certain similarities with that of other ethnic groups in the Philippines, such as in the belief in heaven, hell and the human soul.

== Overview ==
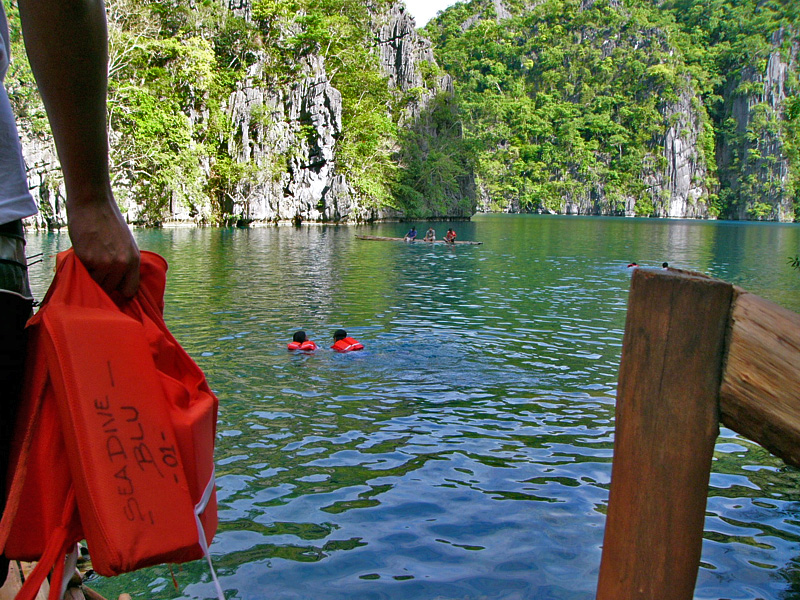
The Kayangan Lake is considered a sacred place by the Tagbanwa people.

The Tagbanwa's relationship with the spirit world is the basis for their rituals, celebration, and dances. The many ceremonial feasts punctuating Tagbanwa life are based on a firm belief in a natural interaction between the world of the living the world of the dead. These ceremonies and rituals takes place on all levels, ranging from rituals perform within the family, to those led by the community's leader on behalf of the people. Such celebrations call for special structures to be built, such as ceremonial platforms and rafts. Rituals offering include rice, chicken and betel nut.

The Tagabanwa tribe has four major deities. The first, the lord of the heavens, was called Mangindusa or Nagabacaban, who sits up in the sky and lets his feet dangle below, above the earth. The god of the sea was named Polo and was deemed a benevolent spirit. His help was invoked in times of illness. The third was the god of the earth named Sedumunadoc, whose favor was sought in order to have a good harvest. The fourth was called Tabiacoud, who lived in the deep bowels of the earth.

For these gods, the Tagbanwa celebrated a big feast each year, right after harvest, when there is much singing, dancing, courting, and conclusion of blood compacts. The babaylan (shaman) called for the people to converge at the seashore, carrying food offering of all kinds. The babaylan took the chickens and roosters brought for the ceremony, and hung them by their legs on tree branches, killing them by beating with a stick. They were allowed only one blow for each animal, and those who survive went free, never to be harmed again, because Polo, the sea god, took them under his protection. The fowl that died were seasoned, cooked and eaten. After eating, they danced and drank rice wine. At midnight, as Buntala, a heavenly body, passed the meridian, the babaylan entered the sea waist dipped, all the while dancing and pushing a raft made of bamboo, which had offering on it. If the offering was returned to the shore by waves and winds, it meant the sea god refused the people's offering. But if the raft disappeared, there was rejoicing. Their offering was accepted and their year would be a happy one.

Other spirits inhabit the forests and environment, and belief in their existence necessitates rituals to placate them or gain their favors. The babaylan performs rituals of life, from birth to death. It is believed that there is a deity who accompanies the soul of the dead to its final destination. Hunters invoke the assistance of the spirits of the dead relatives in asking the owners of the wild pigs to allow their hunting dogs to locate the prey. A mutya (charm) is commonly used to help its possessor succeed in the hunt.

However, the Tagbanwas of the North inhabiting Coron Island are now predominantly Christians due to evangelization efforts of foreign missionaries during the late sixties and seventies.

== The Tagbanwa deities ==
=== Major gods ===
- Mangindusa or Nagabacaban - the highest-ranking deity who lives in Awan-awan, the region beyond the Langit; the god of the heavens; Mangindusa dwells in a sacred area called Awan-awan, a place lying beyond the langit, in a region between the sky world and the earth. He lives with his wife Bugawasin, his messengers, and other celestial beings. While Mangindusa is considered the highest-ranking deity, there is no traditional ascription to him as the sole "creator" of the world, although Christian mythology has had some influence in imbuing Mangindusa with more powers than he used to possess. In fact, the creation of the world and of human beings is said to have been the handiwork of the diwata. Mangindusa has always been traditionally considered the punisher of dusa (crime). In Tagbanua society, the only recognized public dusa is sumbang (incest). In this case, Mangindusa holds the society responsible for the sumbang. Mangindusa's punishment of the society may take the form of withholding the rains. In the past, society punished the offenders by drowning them in the sea. In present society, a huge fine is imposed and in top of this a special lumbay ritual must given in honor of Mangindusa.
- Polo - the benevolent god of the sea; whose help is invoked during the time of illness
- Sedumunadoc - the god of the earth, whose favor is sought in order to have a good harvest
- Tabiacoud the god of the underworld in the deep bowels of the earth

=== The Diwatas ===
The diwatas control the rain, and they are believed to be the creator of the world and of the human beings. They live where the tree trunks that hold up the Langit ("an infinitely high canopy"), which is the visible celestial region.

- Diwata Kat Sidpan - a deity who lives in Sidpan (West)
- Diwata Kat Libatan - a deity who lives in Babatan (East)

=== Celestial beings ===
- Bugawasin - the wife of Mangindusa
- Tungkuyanin - sits on the edge of Langit, with his feet dangling in the vastness of the cosmos and his eyes always cast down toward the earth
- Tumangkuyun - washes the trunks of the trees that hold up the Langit with blood of Tagbanwa who died in epidemics
- Bulalakaw or Diwata Kat Dibuwat - flying deities who roam the region of the clouds, ready to come to the aid of any Tagbanwa needing their help

=== Other deities ===
- Taliyakad - the watcher who guards the vine bridge called Balugu
- Anggugru - the "keeper of the fire," who welcomes the soul to the underworld and gives it fire

== The Tagbanwa spirit world ==
- Awan-Awan - the zenith, or the area beyond Langit; the place where Mangindusa reigns from
- Langit - the visible celestial region where Tungkuyanin sits from
- Sidpan - the West; the placewhere Diwata Kat Sidpan lives at
- Babatan - the East; the place where Diwata Kat Libatan lives at
- Dibuwat - the skyworld of the Bulalakaw or Diwata Kat Dibuwat (flying deities); the "high" region; the place where souls who died of poisoning and violence roam around
- Kiyabusan - the place where souls who died of epidemics or sickness go to
- Basad - the underworld; the place where souls who died of natural death travels to
- Material world - refers to the environment; where souls who died of evil spirits or environmental causes inhabit

== The Tagbanwa soul ==
A Tagbanwa is believed to have six souls in all. A "true soul" called kiyarulwa, and five secondary souls called the payu. The kiyarulwa is a gift of Mangindusa to a child emerging from the mother's womb, while the other souls appear only during the lambay ritual for the child upon reaching one month or two. Lambay is any ceremony, which is directly addressed to Mangindusa. These other souls are found at the extremities of the hands and feet, and on top of the head. When a person dies the kiyarulwa wanders to four possible destinations. If the cause of death is epidemic or sickness, then the soul will go to the Kiyabusan, they become known as the salakap. If a person from poisoning or violence the souls goes to inhabit the Dibuwat. Those who died because their souls were caught by the environmental or evil spirits - their soul will transform into biyaladbad and will inhabit the environment. If a person dies of natural death, the souls travels to Basad, the underworld, and becomes the tiladmanin.

When a Tagbanwa dies, his or her soul remains on earth for seven days, until the kapupusan or rites for the dead are finished. For seven days, the soul lingers on in the grave at daytime, but returns to its former house at night to observe the behavior of those left behind.

=== Basad ===
In its journey to the underworld, the soul encounters several places. These include:

- Kalabagang - the sacred river where souls meets Taliyakad
- Balugu - the vine bridge

In Basad, the spirits of the dead live a life that mirrors exactly that of the living. But everything is the reverse of what happens in the world of living. As the sun rises on earth, it goes down in Basad or planting time on earth is harvest time in Basad.

== The Tagbanwa rituals ==
=== Lambay ===
The lambay is held two times a year. It is observed first in January, and involves ritual appears to the deities for days of sunshine and winds that sufficiently dry the forests and prepare them for clearing and planting. A second one is held in May, when the people ask for moderate rains that will make their upland rice grow.

There are two rituals, which seeks protection for all Tagbanwa wherever they may be, from the feared salakap, the spirits of epidemic, sickness and death. These two rituals are the pagbuyis and the runsay.

=== Pagbuyis ===
The pagbuyis is performed three times a year. The first is in November, and second in December. The third is when the moon can be seen during the daytime, called magkaaldawan.

=== Runsay ===
The runsay is described as the most dramatic of all Tagbanwa rituals. It is observed only once a year, at nighttime, on the fourth day after the full moon of December. It takes place on the beach near the mouth of the Aborlan River. The runsay, like the pagbuyis, is held to ask for protection against epidemic. The ritual begins at dusk and ends at dawn.

==== Phases of Runsay ====
There are five distinct phases in the runsay. These include:

- 1st phase - the building of the bangkaran or banglay, a 3.6m ceremonial raft
- 2nd phase - the panawag, invocation to the spirits of the dead and the nine deities who rode the kawa on the sea; the burning of incense on the kadiyang atop the bangkaran; prayers by the rituals leader; lighting of the candle and offering of ritual foods to the deities
- 3rd phase - the second call to the deities to partake of the food, which the signal for the children to dive into the mound of food on the raft, and eat as much as they can; and the cleaning up and repair of the raft.
- 4th phase - the third invocation to the nine deities, followed by the individual family offerings represented by a woman; the tying of the chicken to the platform and the lighting of candles beside it; the hoisting of the raft towards the sea; the re-lighting of candles blown out by the wind; the throwing of a pinch of rice to the sea; and the voyage seaward of the bankaran.
- 5th phase - includes group singing and dancing after the raft has disappeared

=== Pagdiwata ===
At the center of the diwata rituals is the babaylan, who has the responsibility of selecting the areas for a new clearing, placating the spirits of the surroundings, providing magical charms for hunters and fishers, and curing all kinds of ailments. While any adult can invoke the spirits of the dead in other Tagbanwa rituals, only the babaylan can summon them in the pagdiwata.

=== Bilang ===
The bilang ceremony is the all-important ritual for the dead. It takes place after the rice harvest, a time when tabad becomes plentiful. Every family is expected to host one or more bilang rituals. The bilang rituals begin with the rite of divination, to determine which among the spirit relatives has caused a person's illness. This makes use of the babaylan, who performs the brief rite of panawag near the grave of the dead relative by making offerings of the betel quids and ceremonial cigarettes, and promises tabad should the ill become well. The celebrants together with the offerings prepare a jar of tabad with sipping reeds. The bilang ceremony involves the paurut (invocation) of as many spirit relatives as possible through incantation, and the burning of the parina (incense) whose pleasant smells attract the deities and spirits of the dead. The gongs are played as the paurut is being performed, and their music is an added incentive for the spirit to descend on the gathering. After the ritual offering of the articles have been laid out on the mat, the food is distributed to the children first, and then to the guests; then the bilang mat is removed. The communal drinking of tabad through the reed straws follows, a very festive social event that lasts through the night.
