= Palawano language =

Austronesian language spoken in the Philippines

Palawano
- Native to: Philippines
- Region: Palawan
- Native speakers: 97,620 (2010 census)
- Language family: Austronesian: Malayo-Polynesian; Philippine; Greater Central Philippine; Palawanic; Palawano
- Dialects: Quezon Palawano; Bugsuk Palawano; Southwest Palawano
- Writing system: Ibalnan, Latin alphabet

Language codes
- ISO 639-3: Variously: plw – Brooke's Point Palawano plc – Central Palawano plv – Southwest Palawano
- Glottolog: nucl1738

The Palawano languages are spoken in the province of Palawan in the Philippines, by the Palawano people.

== Classification ==
There are three Palawano languages: the Quezon Palawano (PLC) which is also known as Central Palawano; Brooke's Point Palawano (PLW) and its dialect the Bugsuk Palawano or Southwest Palawano (PLV). The three Palawano languages share the island with several other Palawanic languages which are not part of the Palawano cluster, though they share a fair amount of vocabulary.

== Phonology ==
The following overview is based on Revel-MacDonald (1979).

=== Consonants ===
		Labial	Alveolar	Palatal	Velar	Glottal
Nasal		m	n		ŋ	
Plosive	voiceless	p	t		k	ʔ
Plosive	voiced	b	d		ɡ	
Fricative			s			h
Lateral			l			
Rhotic			ɾ			
Approximant		w		j		

=== Vowels ===
	Front	Back
Close	i	u
Open	a	ɔ

Phoneme	Allophones
/i/	[i], [ɪ], [e], [ɛ]
/u/	[u], [ʊ], [o]
/ɔ/	[ɔ], [ə], [ä]

== Grammar ==
Verb conjugations are similar to other Filipino dialects with prefixes and suffixes indicating tense, object or actor focus, as well as intention (i.e. commands). These prefixes and suffixes can be used to create various parts of speech from the same root word. For example, biyag, meaning 'life', can be manipulated to mean 'to live' (megbiyag), 'full of food' (mebiyag), 'to raise to life' (ipebiyag), 'living' as an adjective (biyagen), or 'living' as a present tense verb form (pebibiyag).

Palawano creates a diminutive prefix by copying the first CV of the base together with the final base consonant: kusiŋ ('cat'): kuŋ-kusiŋ ('kitten'), bajuʔ ('clothing'): bäʔ-bajuʔ ('child's clothing'), libun ('woman'): lin-libun ('girl'), kunit ('yellow'): kut-kunit ('yellow flycatcher' (bird)), siak ('tears'): sik-siak ('crocodile tears/false tears').

=== Pronouns ===
The following set of pronouns are the pronouns found in the Southwest Palawano language. Note: the direct/nominative case is divided between full and short forms.

	Direct/Nominative	Indirect/Genitive	Oblique
1st person singular	ako (ko)	ko	daken/dag
2nd person singular	ikew (ke)	mo	dimo
3rd person singular	ya (ye)	ye	kenye
1st person dual	kite (te)	te	kite
1st person plural inclusive	kiteyo (teyo)	teyo	kiteyo
1st person plural exclusive	kami (kay)	kay	damen
2nd person plural	kemuyo (kaw)	muyo	dimuyo
3rd person plural	diye	diye	kedye

== Vocabulary ==
There are many linguistic variations among Palawan family groups with words changing from one valley to the next (i.e. tabon for 'mountain' versus bukid). Tagalog is frequently used to supply words lacking in the local dialect for modern objects and actions which can cause confusion, especially among the younger generation, between Tagalog and Palawan. The more familiar a family or village is with the Tagalog lowland culture, the more common the language overlap. The Palawano language has also historically incorporated a great number of Malay words. There is also some Bisayan influence similar to what is exhibited in the other parts of Palawan.

Some Brooke's Point Palawan words are:

- bibila` or ibeyba – friend
- maman – uncle (also a term of respect for an older man)
- minan – aunt (also a term of respect for an older woman)
- indu` – mother
- ama` – father
- isi` – get
- karut – sack
- tengeldew – midday
- mangelen – purchase/buy
- surung – go
- bukid or tabon – mountain
- manga`an – eat
- menunga – good
- kusing, demang, esing – cat
- pegingin – love (noun)

Phrases:

- Embe surungan mu la`? – friendly way of asking "Where are you going friend?", as a form of greeting.
- Dun bukid ti`, mengisi` ku et karut – means 'There, to the mountain, I will get a sack.'
- Endey mengagat – this is usually referring to the dog, as a way to say "don't bite"
- Embe tena'an mu? – Where are you going?
- Dut daya. – Up the hill
- Menungang Meriklem. – Good morning

=== Comparative wordlist ===
The following compares the Palawano languages with other Greater Central Philippine languages.

English	one	two	three	four	person	house	dog	coconut	day	new	we (inclusive)	what	fire
Central Palawano 1	sengbat	dowa	telo	epat	taw	benwa	ido	niyog	eldew	bago	kiteyo	ono	apoy
Central Palawano 2	sambat	duwa	talu	apat	ta'u	bənwa'	idəng	nyog	əldaw	ba'agu	kiteyo	ənu	apoy
Southwest Palawano 1	isa'	dua	telo	epat	taaw	benwa	ideng	nyug	eldew	bago	kiteyo	eno	apoy
Southwest Palawano 2	sɔmbat	dua	tɔlu	ɔpat	ta'o	bənua	idɔng	nyug	aldɔw	ba'go	kiteyo	ɔno	apuy
Tagalog	isa	dalawa	tatlo	apat	tao	bahay	aso	niyog	araw	bago	tayo	ano	apoy
Aklanon	isaea, sambilog	daywa	tatlo	ap-at	tawo	baeay	ayam	niyog	adlaw	bag-o	kita	ano	kaeayo
Hiligaynon	isa	duha/dua	tatlo	apat	tawo	balay	ido	lubi	adlaw	bag-o	kita	ano	kalayo

== Writing system ==
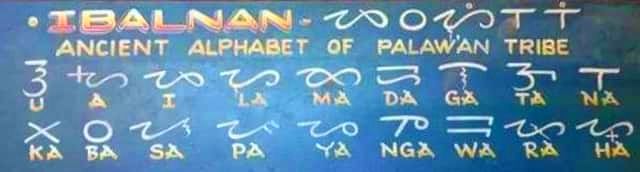
The Ibalnan alphabet

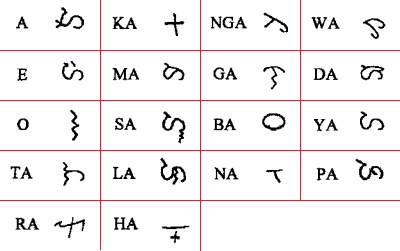
Another sample of the Ibalnan script

=== Latin alphabet ===
The spelling is controversial with multiple translators using separate spelling methods, some using Tagalog-based spelling while others use other systems.

Brooke's Point Palawano uses 23 letters: a, b, [k], d, e, g, h, i, j, k, l, m, n, ng, o, p, r, s, t, u, w, y, and ' (glottal stop). Borrowed: c, f, q, x, z. The 'e' stands for schwa and "dy" makes a 'j' sound.

=== Ibalnan script ===
In the 20th century, the Tagbanwa script was adopted from the Tagbanwa people by the Palawan people further south in the island. They call this alphabet Ibalnan and the vowel mark an ulit.
