= Rodolfo Aguilar I =

Filipino tribal chief

Rodolfo Aguilar was a famous Tagbanwa Tribal Chieftain of Coron Island Ancestral Domain in the Philippines.

== IPRA law ==
The management and control of Coron Island (also called Calis by the tribe) was only revived upon passage of the Indigenous Peoples' Rights Act of 1997 (IPRA law) that accords tribal minorities rights and privileges allowing them control over their ancestral lands. Aguilar was instrumental in the passing of the IPRA law. He stood in the halls of the Senate of the Philippines and explained the importance of territorial skies above ancestral lands for inclusion in the IPRA law. He also fought for the inclusion of the island's surrounding waters into the ancestral domain.
