= Coron Island =

Island in the Calamian Islands in Palawan in the Philippines

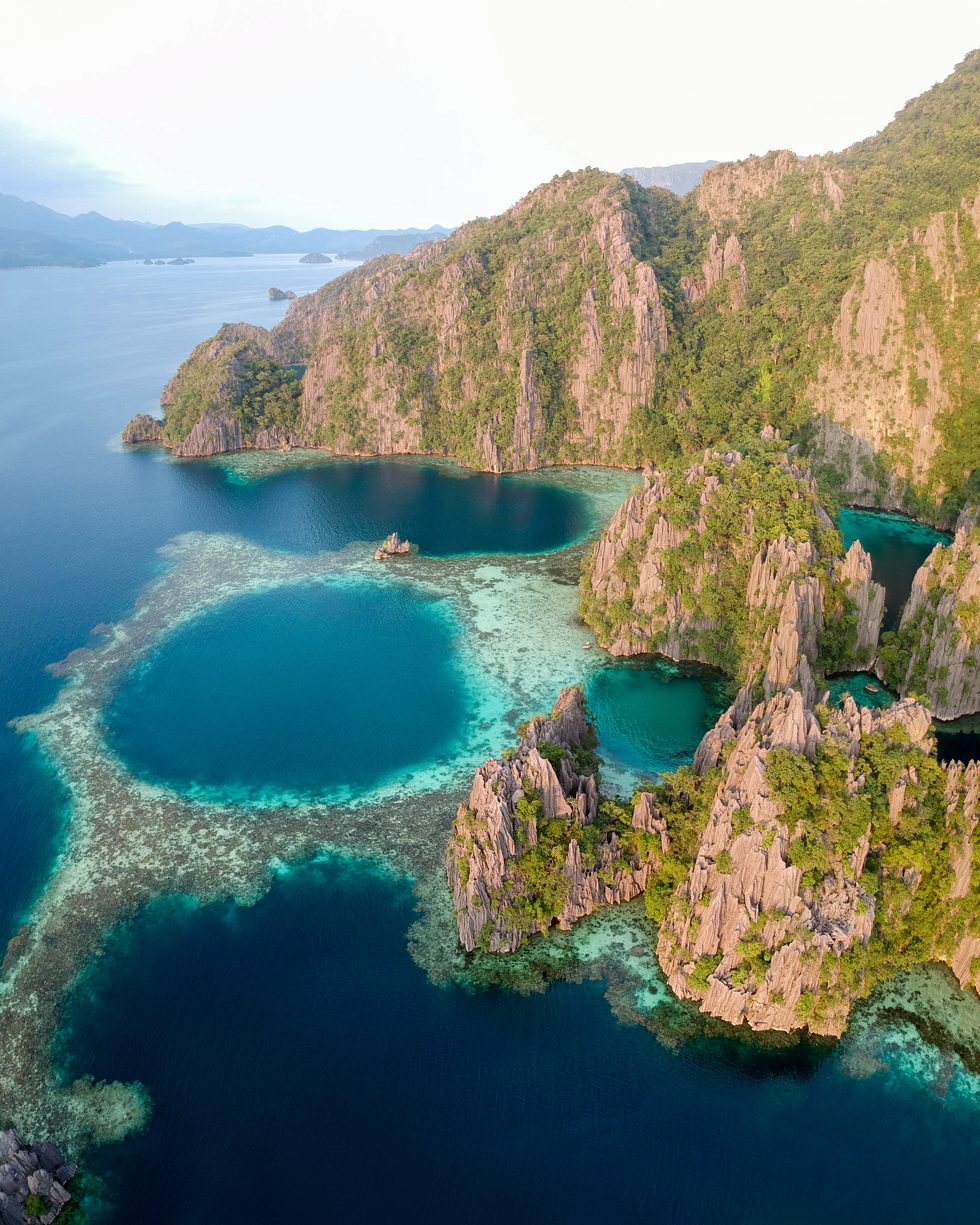
- Twin Lagoon, Coron Island

- Location within Philippines

Geography
- Coordinates: 11°55′45″N 120°14′30″E
- Archipelago: Calamian Group of Islands
- Adjacent to: Sulu Sea
- Area: 71 km^{2} (27 sq mi)
- Length: 20 km (12 mi)
- Width: 9 km (5.6 mi)
- Highest elevation: 600 m (2000 ft)

Administration
- Philippines
- Region: Mimaropa
- Province: Palawan
- Municipality: Coron

Demographics
- Population: 2649 (2010)

Coron is the third-largest island in the Calamian Islands in northern Palawan in the Philippines. The island is part of the larger municipality of the same name. It is about 170 nautical miles (310 km) southwest of Manila and is known for several Japanese shipwrecks from World War II. Because of its unique ecological features, the entire area is protected by several legal proclamations.

The island and its surrounding fishing grounds are part of the ancestral domain of the indigenous Tagbanwa people, officially designated as such on June 5, 1998. The island is known as Calis among the Tagbanwas and Coronians, and its tribal chieftain is Rodolfo Aguilar I.

The island comprises two barangays within the municipality of Coron: Banuang Daan and Cabugao.

== Geography ==
Coron Island is situated between Busuanga and Culion islands, faces the Sulu Sea and forms the eastern side of Coron Bay. It is about 20 kilometres (12 mi) long from north to south, and 9 kilometres (5.6 mi) at its widest point.

Part of the North Palawan Block, Coron Island is distinguished by its Late Triassic Coron Limestone.

The island contains 15 lakes within its rugged terrain, of which three have underground connections to the sea. Mangroves are found along some coastal areas.

== Diving ==
The areas around some of the shipwrecks have rock formations that provide snorkeling opportunities, with underwater visibility of up to 80 feet (24 m). The water is often calm.

Coron is known for wreck diving. Its world-renowned wreck dive sites are found at depths ranging from 6 metres (20 ft) to 46 metres (151 ft). The ten shipwreck diving sites in Coron Bay include the Akitsushima, Irako, Kogyo Maru, Kyokuzan Maru, Okikawa Maru, Olympia Maru, SS.Morazan, Terukaze Maru, and the 'Lusong Gunboat.

Dive sites around Coron include shipwreck dives, and reefs. Barracuda Lake has water temperatures that increases during descent to more than 38 °C (100 °F) producing thermoclines. Its mixture of salt and fresh water creates holocline where the two layers meet.

"Günter's Cave", also known as Cathedral Cave, has a hole in the cave ceiling through which, at a specific time of day, a beam of sunlight illuminates the inside. It is situated in the south east, It is possible to surface in the cave because fresh air enters through the hole. The cave is named after Günther Bernert, who was part of the first dive group to explore it after hearing about its existence from local fishermen.

== Other points of interest ==
Ecotourism has surpassed diving as a major draw to Coron Island. With domestic tourism on the rise, Coron Island is home to some notable sights:

- Kayangan Lake
- Luluyuan "Barracuda" Lake
- Twin Lagoon

== Gallery ==
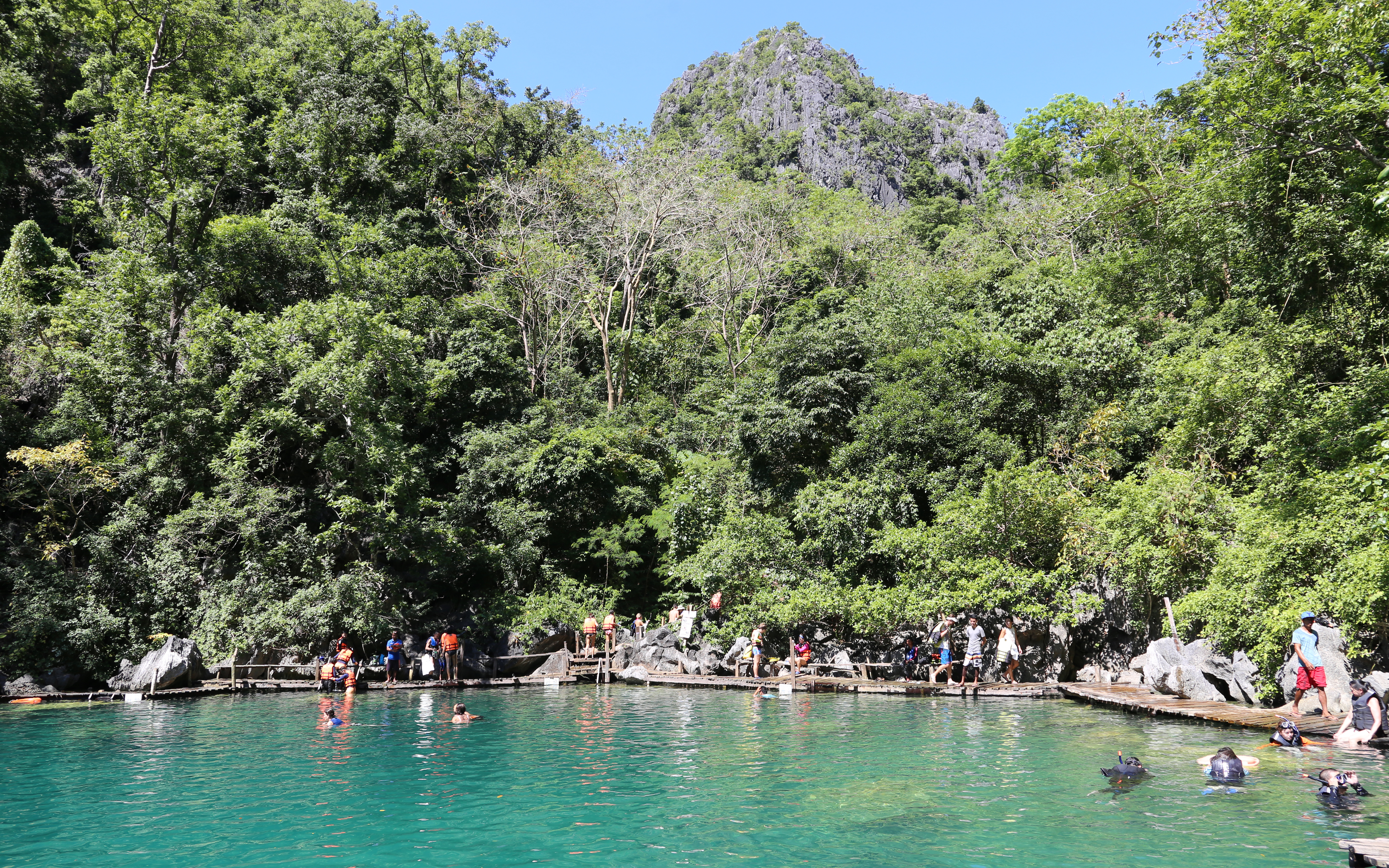
Kayangan Lake, dubbed the cleanest lake in Asia

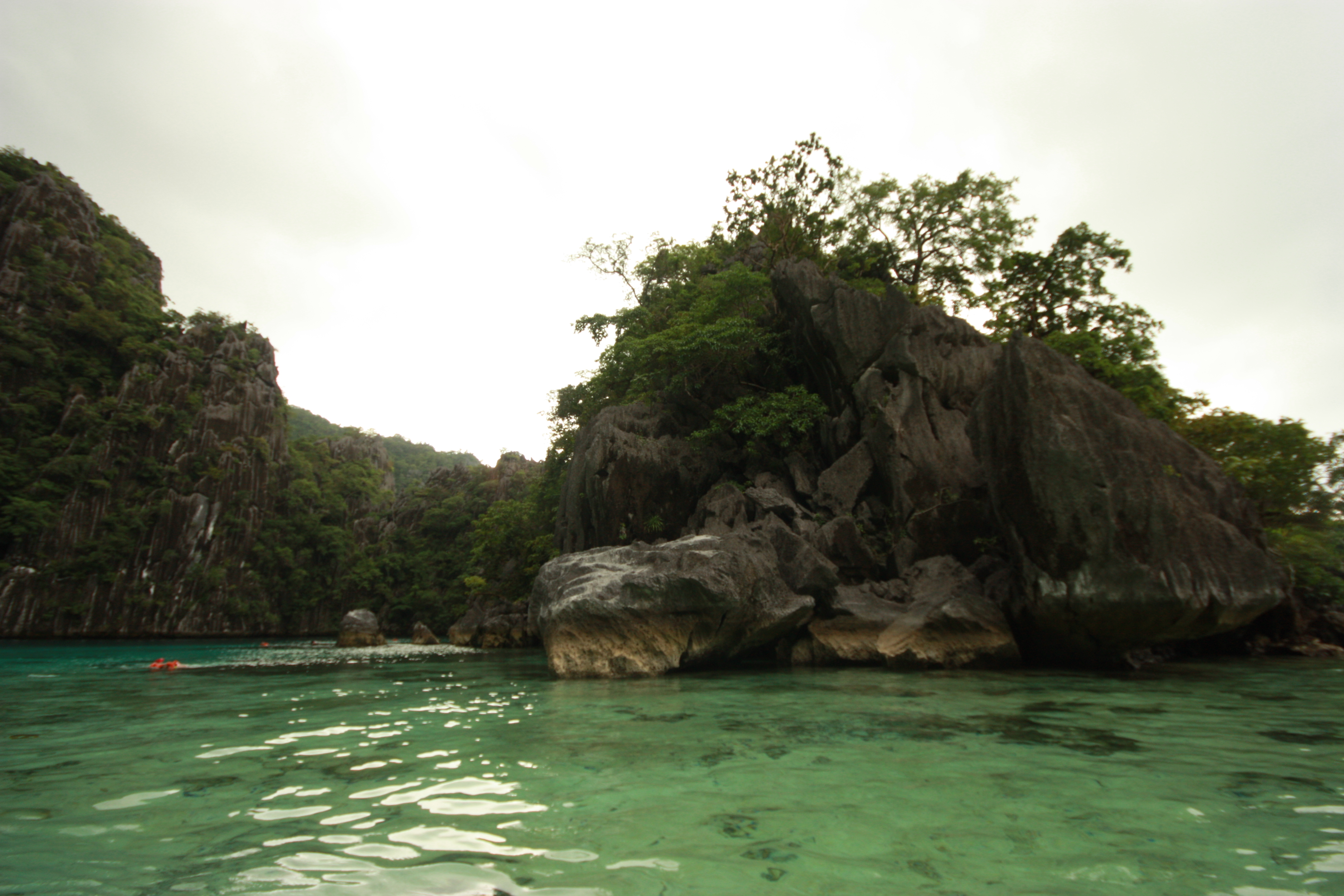
The Twin Lagoon in Coron Island

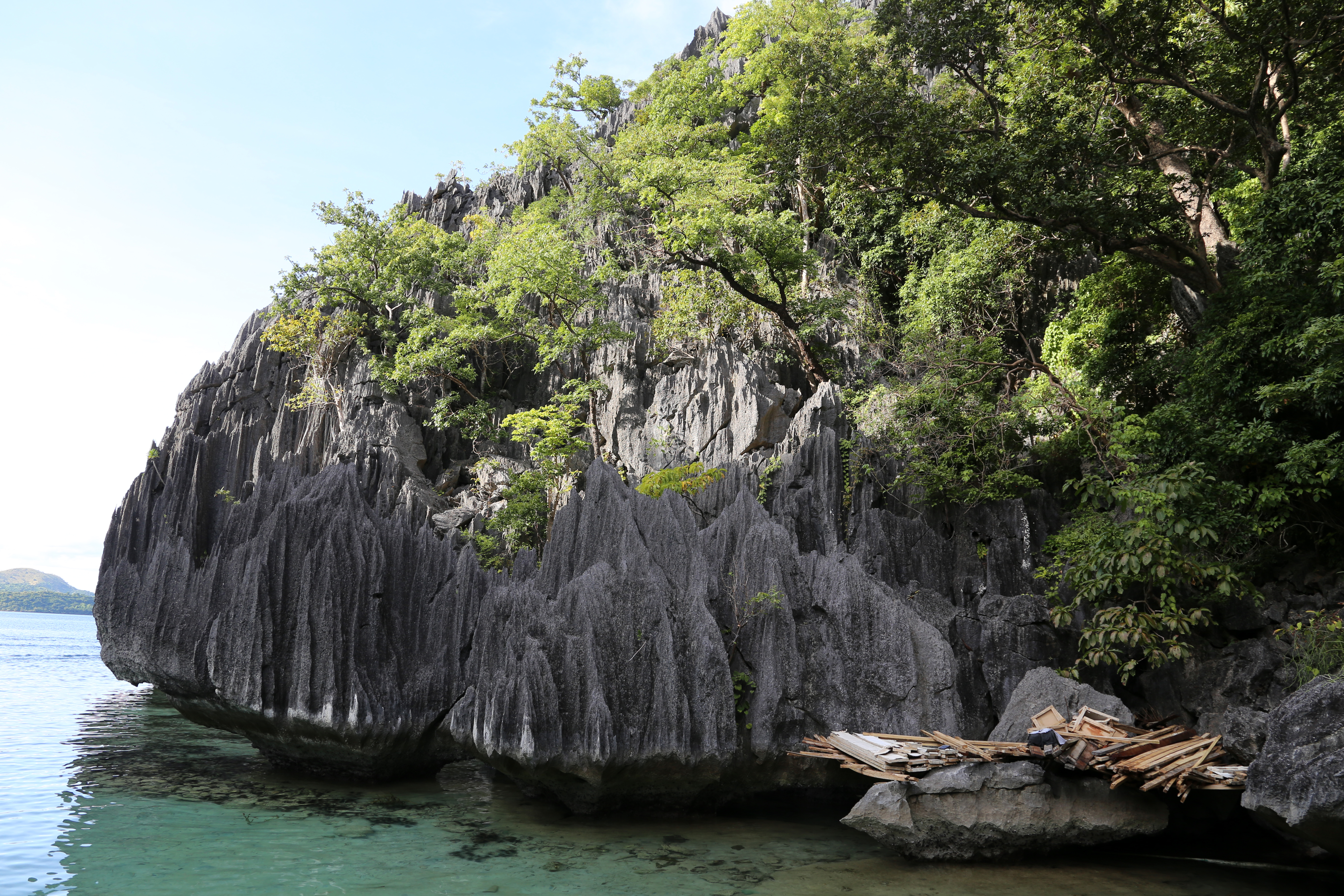
Large rock formations at the Barracuda Lake

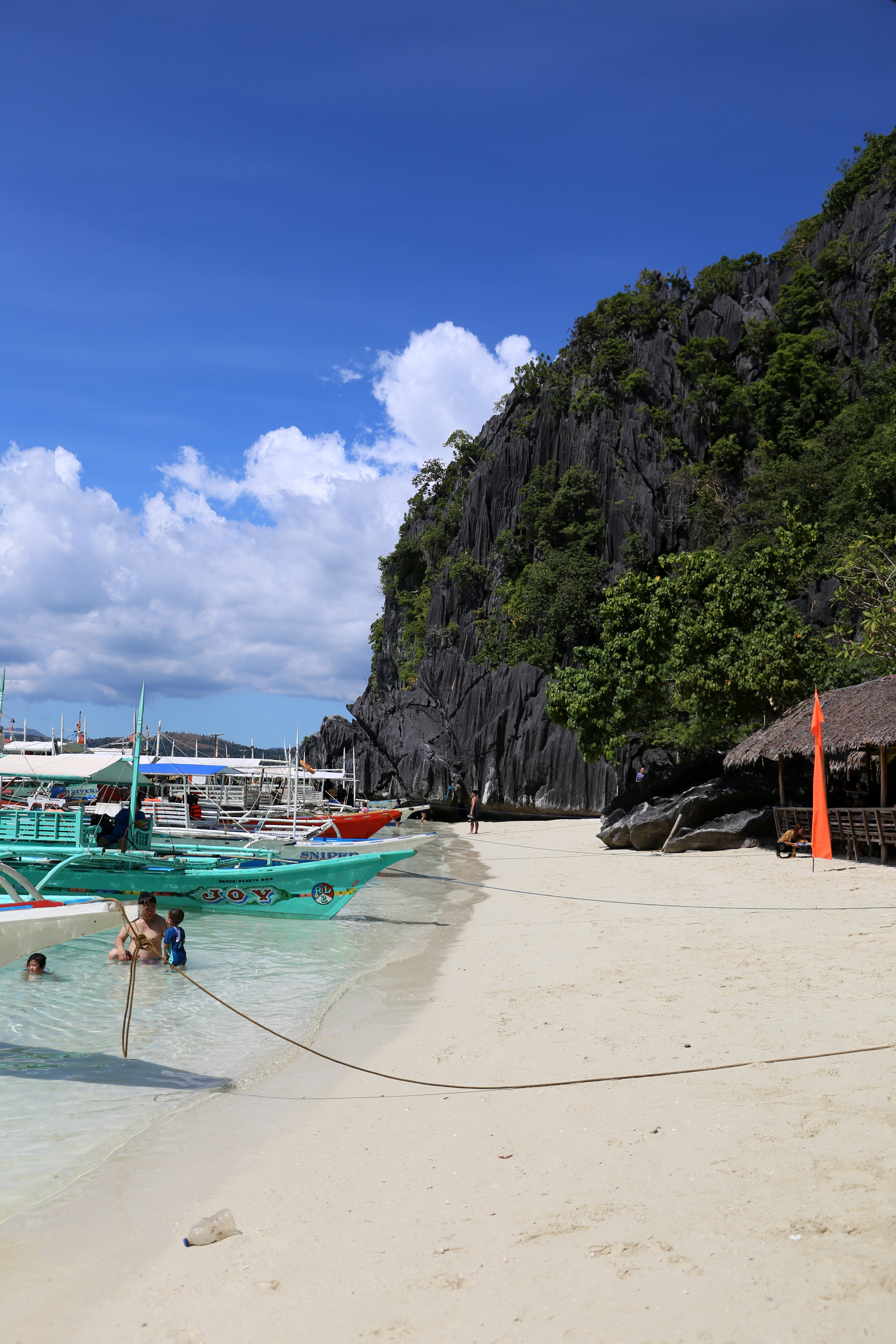
Banol beach on Coron Island

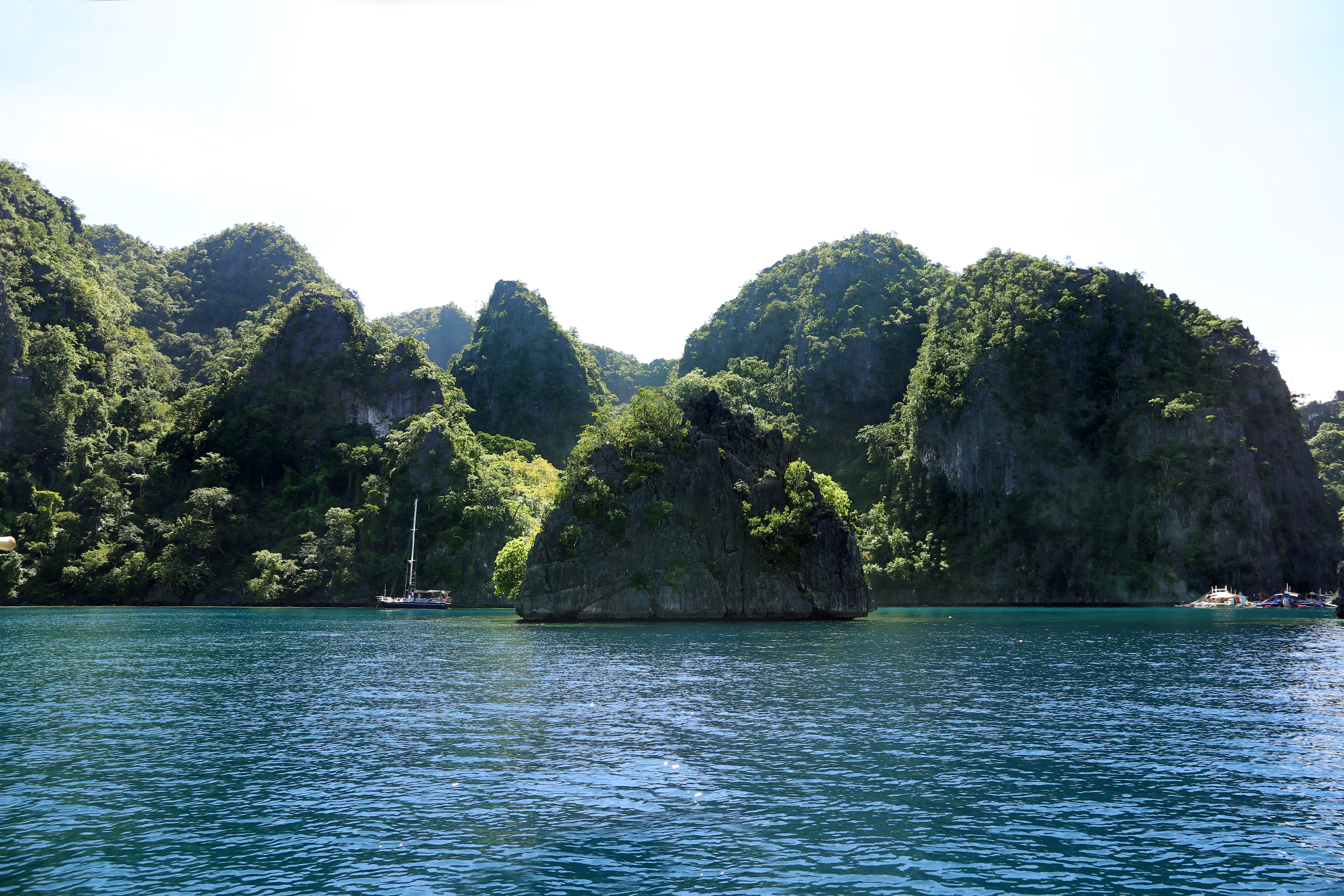
Coron Island rock formations

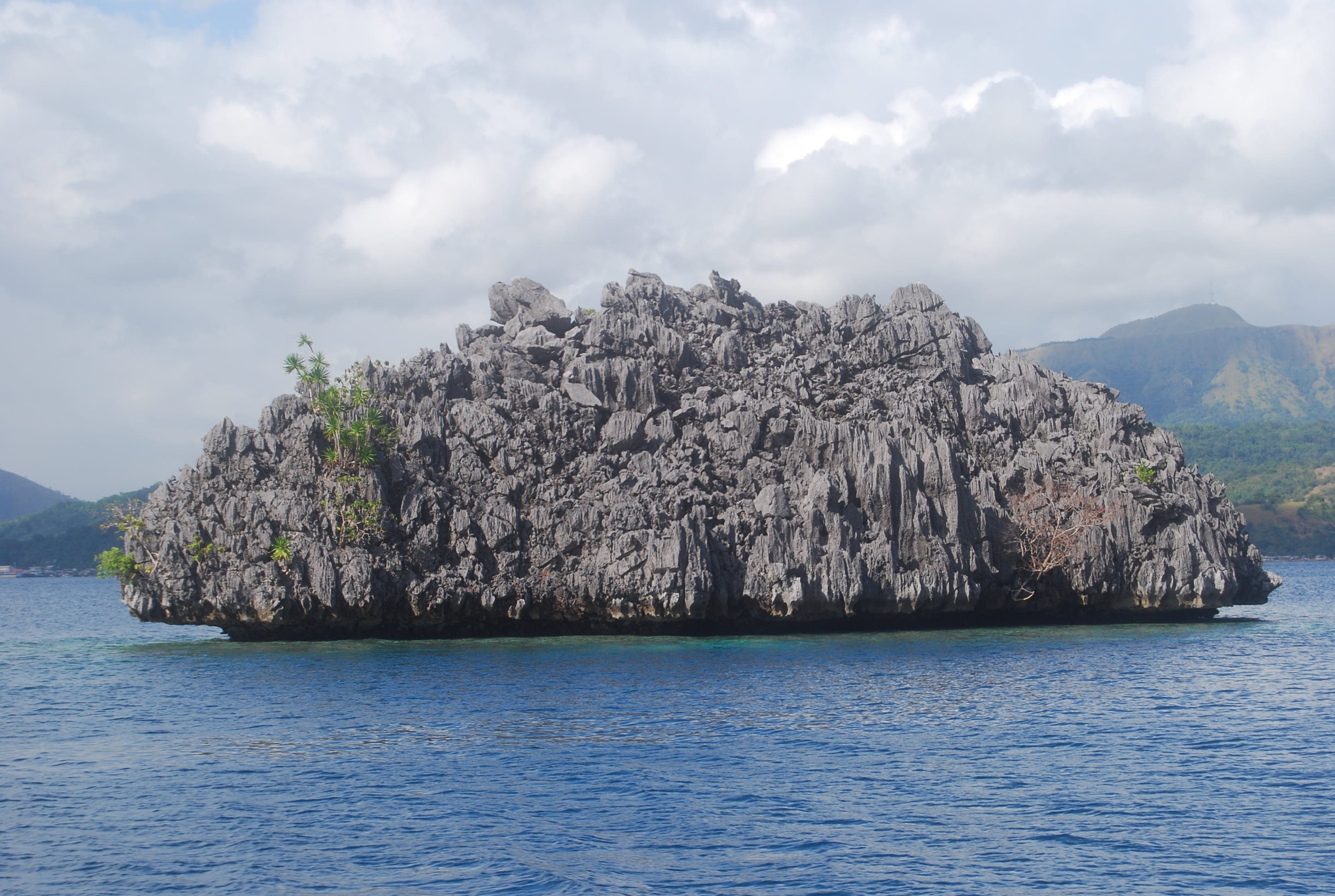
A stone islet in Coron Island

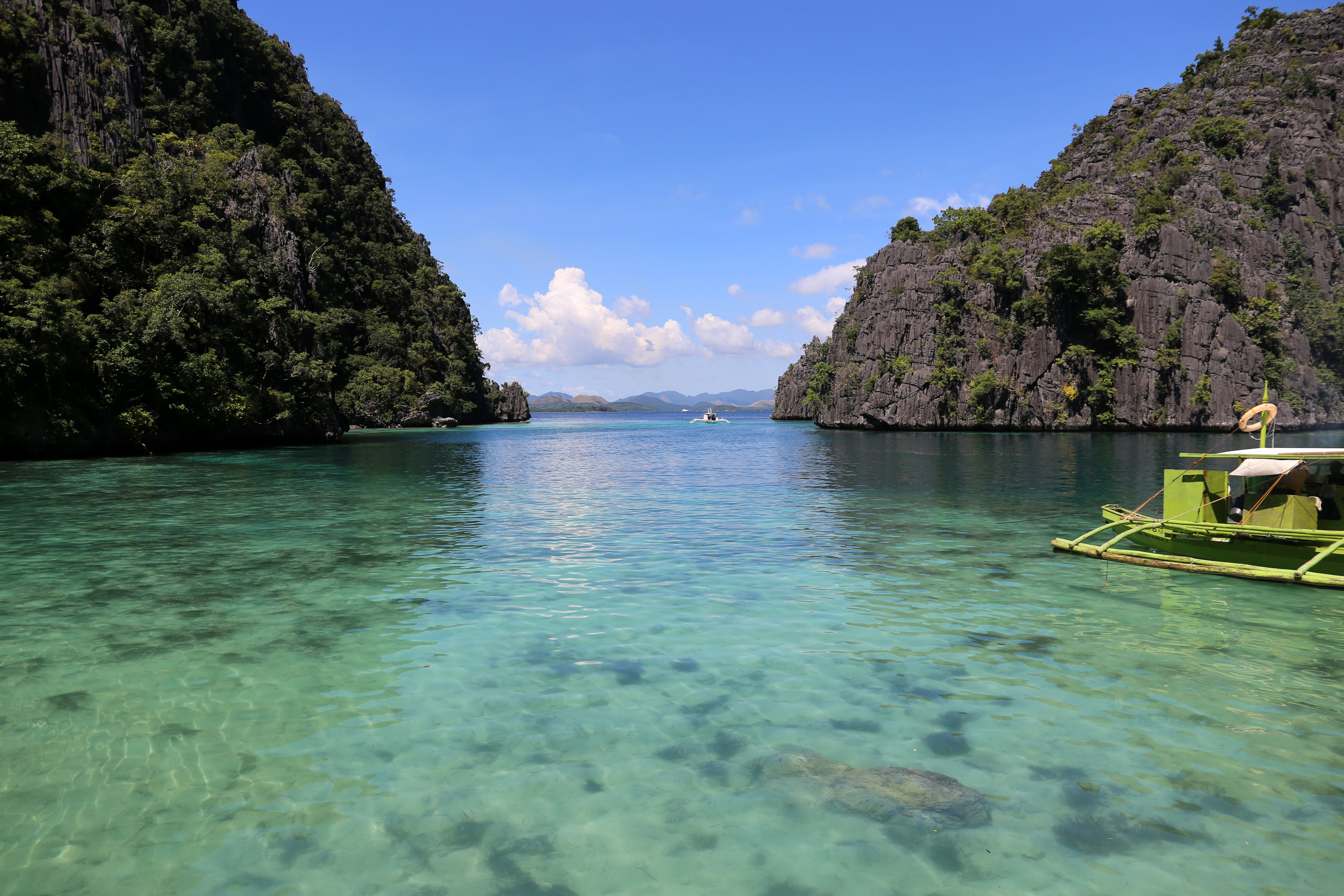
The bay near Kayangan Lake

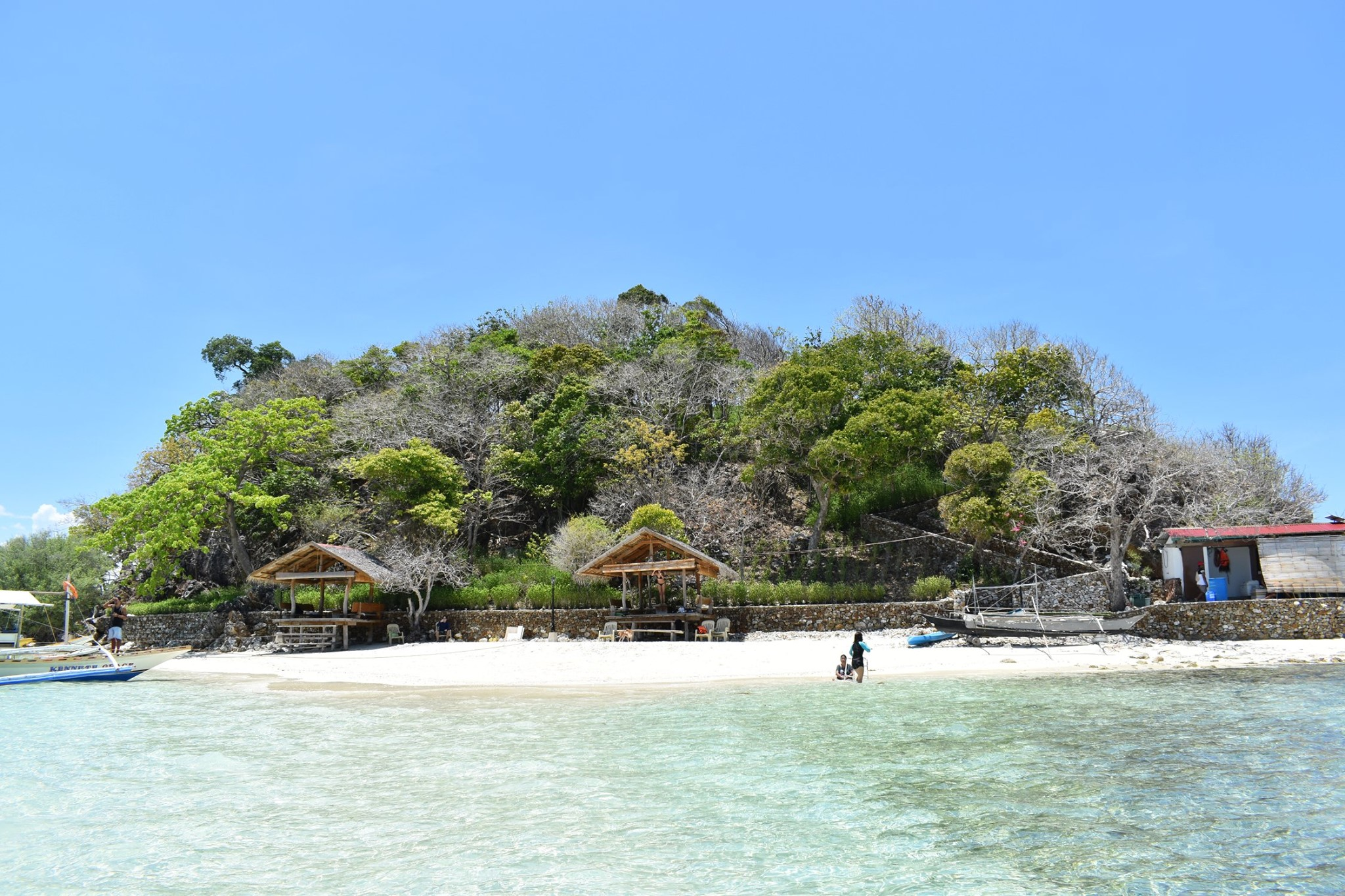
Waling-Waling Island

== See also ==
- List of islands of the Philippines
- Francisco B. Reyes Airport
