= Tagbanwa (Unicode block) =

- Range: U+1760..U+177F (32 code points)
- Plane: BMP
- Scripts: Tagbanwa
- Major alphabets: Tagbanwa
- Assigned: 18 code points
- Unused: 14 reserved code points

Unicode version history
- 3.2 (2002): 18 (+18)

Unicode documentation
- Code chart ∣ Web page

Tagbanwa is a Unicode block containing characters for writing the Tagbanwa languages.

Tagbanwa^{[1]}^{[2]} Official Unicode Consortium code chart (PDF)
| | 0 | 1 | 2 | 3 | 4 | 5 | 6 | 7 | 8 | 9 | A | B | C | D | E | F |
| U+176x | ᝠ | ᝡ | ᝢ | ᝣ | ᝤ | ᝥ | ᝦ | ᝧ | ᝨ | ᝩ | ᝪ | ᝫ | ᝬ | | ᝮ | ᝯ |
| U+177x | ᝰ | | ᝲ | ᝳ | | | | | | | | | | | | |
Notes: 1. As of Unicode version 16.0; 2. Grey areas indicate non-assigned code points

== History ==
The following Unicode-related documents record the purpose and process of defining specific characters in the Tagbanwa block:

| Version | Final code points (Note: Proposed code points and characters names may differ from final code points and names) | Count | L2 ID | WG2 ID | Document |
|---|---|---|---|---|---|
| 3.2 | U+1760..176C, 176E..1770, 1772..1773 | 18 | L2/98-217 | N1755 (pdf, Attach) | Everson, Michael (1998-05-25), Proposal for encoding the Philippine scripts in the BMP of ISO/IEC 10646 |
| 3.2 | U+1760..176C, 176E..1770, 1772..1773 | 18 | L2/98-397 | | Everson, Michael (1998-11-23), Revised proposal for encoding the Philippine scripts in the UCS |
| 3.2 | U+1760..176C, 176E..1770, 1772..1773 | 18 | L2/99-014 | N1933 | Everson, Michael (1998-11-23), Revised proposal for encoding the Philippine scripts in the UCS |
| 3.2 | U+1760..176C, 176E..1770, 1772..1773 | 18 | L2/98-419 (pdf, doc) | | Aliprand, Joan (1999-02-05), "Philippine Scripts", Approved Minutes -- UTC #78 & NCITS Subgroup L2 # 175 Joint Meeting, San Jose, CA -- December 1-4, 1998, "[#78-M8] Motion:To accept document L2/98-397, Revised proposal for encoding Philippine scripts, for addition to the Unicode Standard after Version 3.0." |
| 3.2 | U+1760..176C, 176E..1770, 1772..1773 | 18 | L2/99-232 | N2003 | Umamaheswaran, V. S. (1999-08-03), "9.4.1", Minutes of WG 2 meeting 36, Fukuoka, Japan, 1999-03-09--15 |
| 3.2 | U+1760..176C, 176E..1770, 1772..1773 | 18 | L2/00-097 | N2194 | Sato, T. K. (2000-02-22), Philippino characters (status report) |
| 3.2 | U+1760..176C, 176E..1770, 1772..1773 | 18 | L2/00-357 | | Everson, Michael (2000-10-16), Philippine Scripts (draft block description) |
| 3.2 | U+1760..176C, 176E..1770, 1772..1773 | 18 | L2/01-050 | N2253 | Umamaheswaran, V. S. (2001-01-21), "7.14 Philippine scripts", Minutes of the SC2/WG2 meeting in Athens, September 2000 |
