= Taawʼt Bato language =

Austronesian language spoken in Philippines

Taawʼt Bato
- Native to: Philippines
- Region: Singnapan Valley in Rizal, Quezon, and Brooke's Point municipalities in Palawan
- Ethnicity: Taawʼt Bato
- Native speakers: (87 cited 1983)
- Language family: Austronesian: Malayo-Polynesian; Philippine; Greater Central Philippine; Palawanic; Taawʼt Bato

Language codes
- ISO 639-3: None (mis)
- Glottolog: taut1234

Taawʼt Bato (Tauʼt Batu) is one of several closely related languages spoken on Palawan Island in the Philippines. It is spoken by the indigenous peoples of Taawʼt Bato on the municipal boundary of Rizal, Quezon, and Brooke's Point in Palawan province also known as the Singnapan Valley.
