= Tagbanwa script =

Native writing system of Tagbanwa languages and other indigenous languages of Palawan

Tagbanwa script ᝦᝪᝯ
- Script type: Abugida
- Period: c. 1300–present
- Direction: Left-to-right
- Region: Palawan Island
- Languages: Palawanic languages

Related scripts
- Parent systems: Egyptian hieroglyphs: Proto-Sinaitic script; Phoenician alphabet; Aramaic alphabet; Brahmi script; Pallava script; Kawi script; Baybayin; Tagbanwa script
- Sister systems: In the Philippines: Baybayin; Buhid script; Hanunó'o script; Kulitan; In Indonesian Archipelago: Balinese; Batak; Javanese; Lontara; Sundanese; Rencong; Rejang; Bima; Makasar

ISO 15924
- ISO 15924: Tagb (373), Tagbanwa

Unicode
- Unicode alias: Tagbanwa
- Unicode range: U+1760–U+177F

Tagbanwa is one of the scripts indigenous to the Philippines, used by the Tagbanwa and the Palawan people as their ethnic writing system.

The Tagbanwa languages (Aborlan, Calamian and Central), which are Austronesian languages with about 8,000-25,000 total speakers in the central and northern regions of Palawan, are dying out as the younger generations of Tagbanwa are learning and using non-traditional languages such as Cuyonon and Tagalog, thus becoming less knowledgeable of their own indigenous cultural heritage. There are proposals to revive the script by teaching it in public and private schools with Tagbanwa populations.

== Origin ==
The Tagbanwa script was used in the Philippines until the 17th century. Closely related to Baybayin, it is believed to have come from the Kawi script of Java, Bali and Sumatra, which in turn, descended from the Pallava script, one of the southern Indian scripts derived from Brahmi.

== Features ==
Tagbanwa is an alphasyllabary or abugida in which each letter represents a syllable consisting of a consonant and an inherent vowel /a/, a feature that it shares with many related scripts from SE Asia as they derive from variants of the Brahmic scripts of India. Similar to these scripts, vowels other than /a/ are indicated by the addition of a diacritic above (for /i/) or below (for /u/) the letter. Lone vowels are represented by their own, independent letters, thus /a/, /i/ and /u/ since there are only three. Syllables ending in a consonant are written without the final consonant. Tagbanwa is distinguished from Baybayin by the shapes of several letters, most notably ‹ka› and ‹wa› that are markedly different from other varieties.

Tagbanwa is traditionally written on bamboo in vertical columns from bottom to top and left to right. However, it is read from left to right in horizontal lines.

Tagbanwa syllables
vowels		consonants												
ᝠ a		ᝣ ka	ᝤ ga	ᝥ nga	ᝦ ta	ᝧ da	ᝨ na	ᝩ pa	ᝪ ba	ᝫ ma	ᝬ ya	ᝮ la	ᝯ wa	ᝰ sa
ᝡ i	ᝲ i	ᝣ + ᝲ ᝣᝲ ki	ᝤ+ ᝲ ᝤᝲ gi	ᝥ + ᝲ ᝥᝲ ngi	ᝦ + ᝲ ᝦᝲ ti	ᝧ + ᝲ ᝧᝲ di	ᝨ + ᝲ ᝨᝲ ni	ᝩ + ᝲ ᝩᝲ pi	ᝪ + ᝲ ᝪᝲ bi	ᝫ + ᝲ ᝫᝲ mi	ᝬ + ᝲ ᝬᝲ yi	ᝮ + ᝲ ᝮᝲ li	ᝯ + ᝲ ᝯᝲ wi	ᝰ + ᝲ ᝰᝲ si
ᝢ u	ᝳ u	ᝣ + ᝳ ᝣᝳ ku	ᝤ + ᝳ ᝤᝳ gu	ᝥ + ᝳ ᝥᝳ ngu	ᝦ + ᝳ ᝦᝳ tu	ᝧ + ᝳ ᝧᝳ du	ᝨ + ᝳ ᝨᝳ nu	ᝩ + ᝳ ᝩᝳ pu	ᝪ + ᝳ ᝪᝳ bu	ᝫ + ᝳ ᝫᝳ mu	ᝬ + ᝳ ᝬᝳ yu	ᝮ + ᝳ ᝮᝳ lu	ᝯ + ᝳ ᝯᝳ wu	ᝰ + ᝳ ᝰᝳ su

Tagbanwa writing makes use of single (᜵) and double (᜶) punctuation marks.

== Ibalnan ==
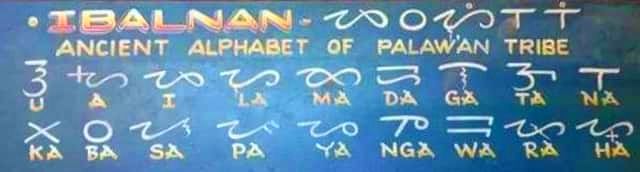
The Ibalnan alphabet

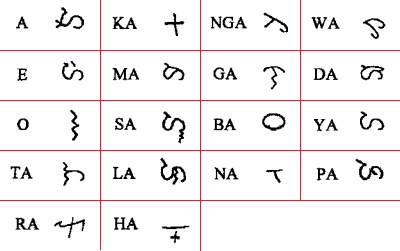
Another sample of the Ibalnan script

In the 20th century, this script was adopted from the Tagbanwa by the Palaw'an further south in the island. They call this alphabet Ibalnan and the vowel mark an ulit.

== Unicode ==
Tagbanwa script was added to the Unicode Standard in March, 2002 with the release of version 3.2.

The Unicode block for Tagbanwa is U+1760–U+177F:

Tagbanwa^{[1]}^{[2]} Official Unicode Consortium code chart (PDF)
	0	1	2	3	4	5	6	7	8	9	A	B	C	D	E	F
U+176x	ᝠ	ᝡ	ᝢ	ᝣ	ᝤ	ᝥ	ᝦ	ᝧ	ᝨ	ᝩ	ᝪ	ᝫ	ᝬ		ᝮ	ᝯ
U+177x	ᝰ		ᝲ	ᝳ												
Notes 1.As of Unicode version 17.0 2.Grey areas indicate non-assigned code points

== See also ==
- Suyat
- Baybayin
- Buhid script
- Hanunó'o script
- Kulitan
- Kawi script
- Filipino orthography
