= Busuanga Island =

Island in the Calamian Group in the Philippines

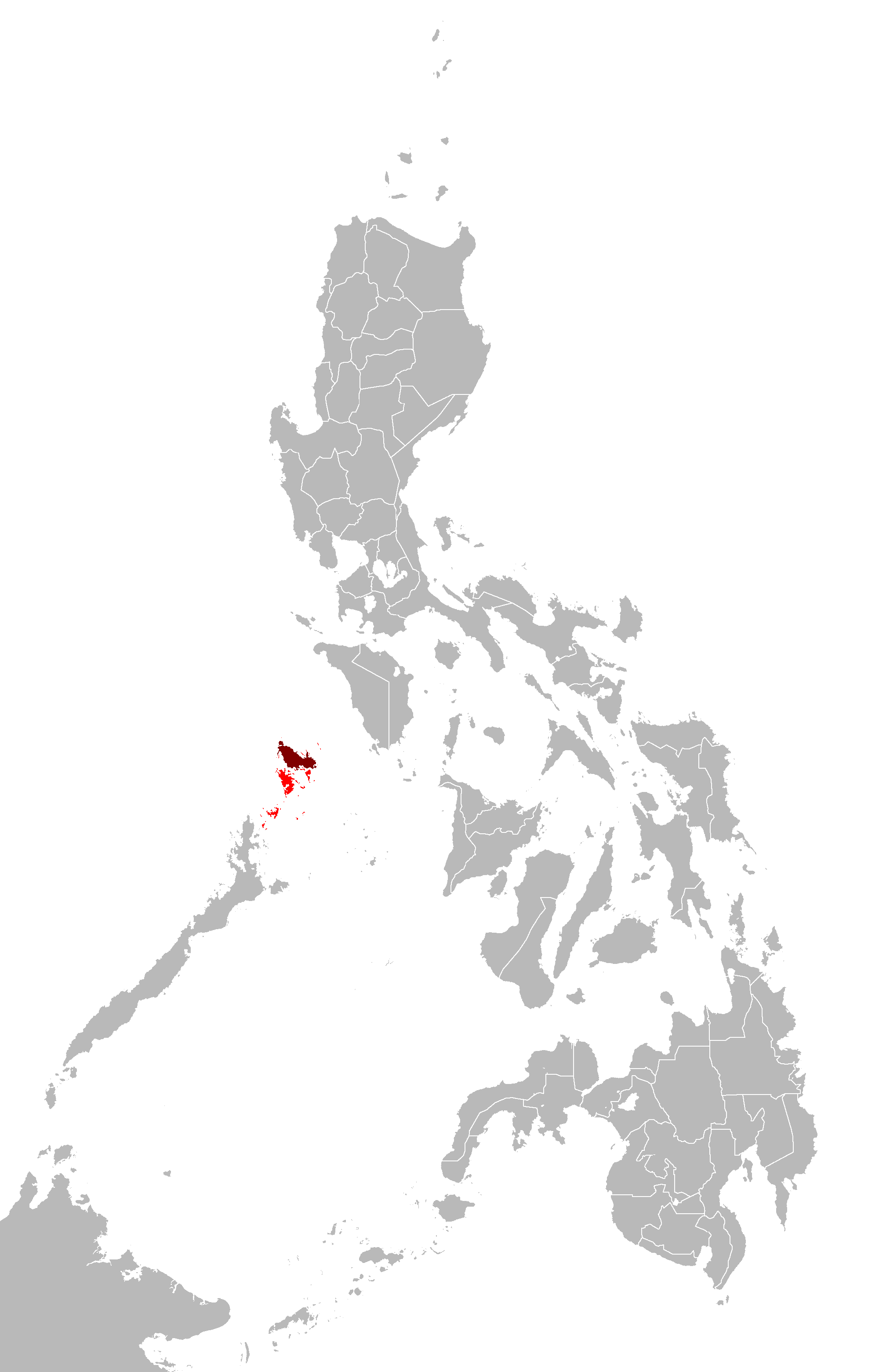
- Map showing the Calamian Group (in red) and Busuanga Island (in maroon)

- Location within Palawan

Geography
- Location: Mindoro Strait
- Coordinates: 12°8′42″N 120°5′41″E
- Archipelago: Calamianes
- Adjacent to: South China Sea; Sulu Sea
- Area: 890 km^{2} (340 sq mi)
- Highest elevation: 2,034 ft (620 m)
- Highest point: Mount Dalara

Administration
- Philippines
- Region: Mimaropa
- Province: Palawan
- Municipalities: Busuanga; Coron

Demographics
- Population: 73,849 (as of 2015)

Additional information
- Official website: https://coron-busuanga.com/

Busuanga, is the largest island in the Calamian Group of islands in the province of Palawan in the Philippines. Busuanga Island is the second largest island in the province after Palawan island itself. The island is located halfway between the islands of Mindoro and Palawan with the South China Sea located to the west and the Sulu Sea to the southeast. South of the island are the two other major islands of the Calamian Group: Culion Island and Coron Island. The western third of the island is under the municipality of Busuanga and the eastern two-thirds belong to the municipality of Coron.

Busuanga Island is known as a recreational diving location due to World War II Japanese wrecks that were sunk by American navy bombings in Coron Bay, a natural anchorage near the town center of Coron, on September 24, 1944.

== Geology ==
Part of the North Palawan Block, Busuanga Island consists mainly of the Liminangcong Formation, a Permian to Late Jurassic chert. This chert forms the distinguishing mountain ranges, with the Middle-Late Jurassic Guinlo Formation clastics forming the valleys on Busuanga. Busuanga was known for its tabular manganese deposits found within the chert sequence, 1 meter (3 ft 3 in) thick and extending laterally up to 200 meters (660 ft). Braunite is the common manganese mineral type found in the ore.

=== Geology Gallery ===
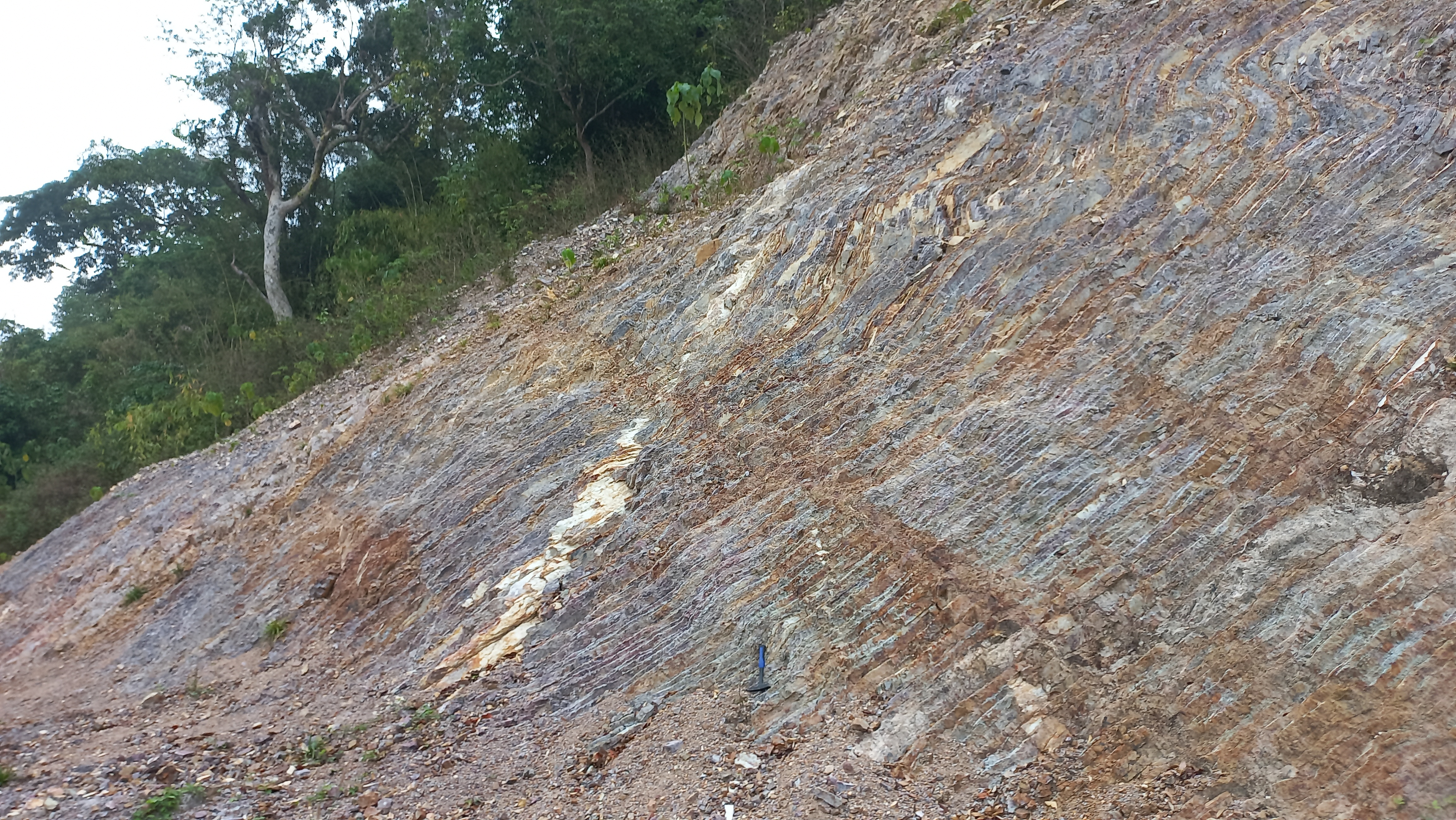
An outcrop of deformed Liminangcong chert along the Coron-Busuanga road near the Marina del Sol yacht club

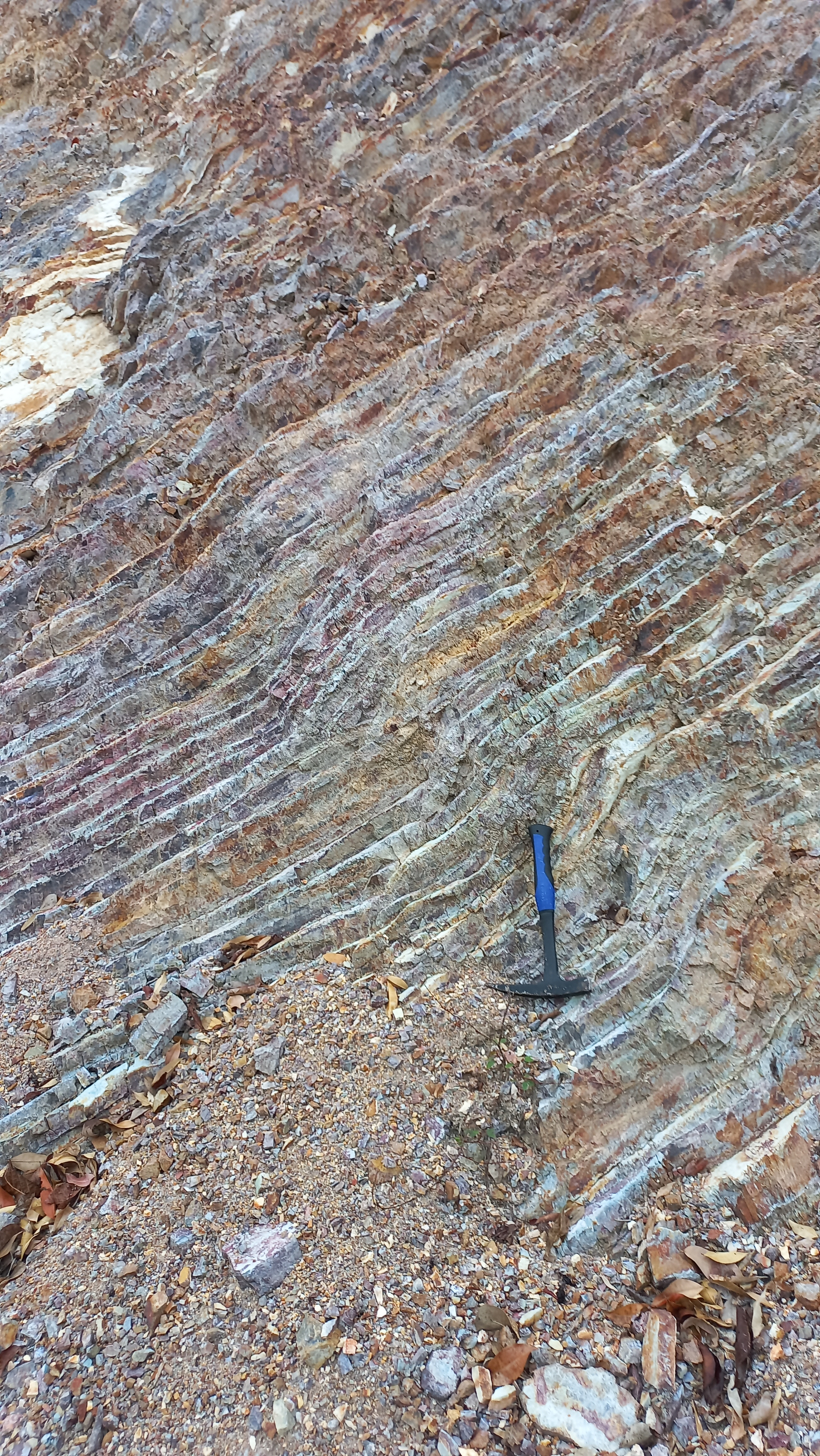
Close-up view of the folded layers of Liminangcong chert in Busuanga

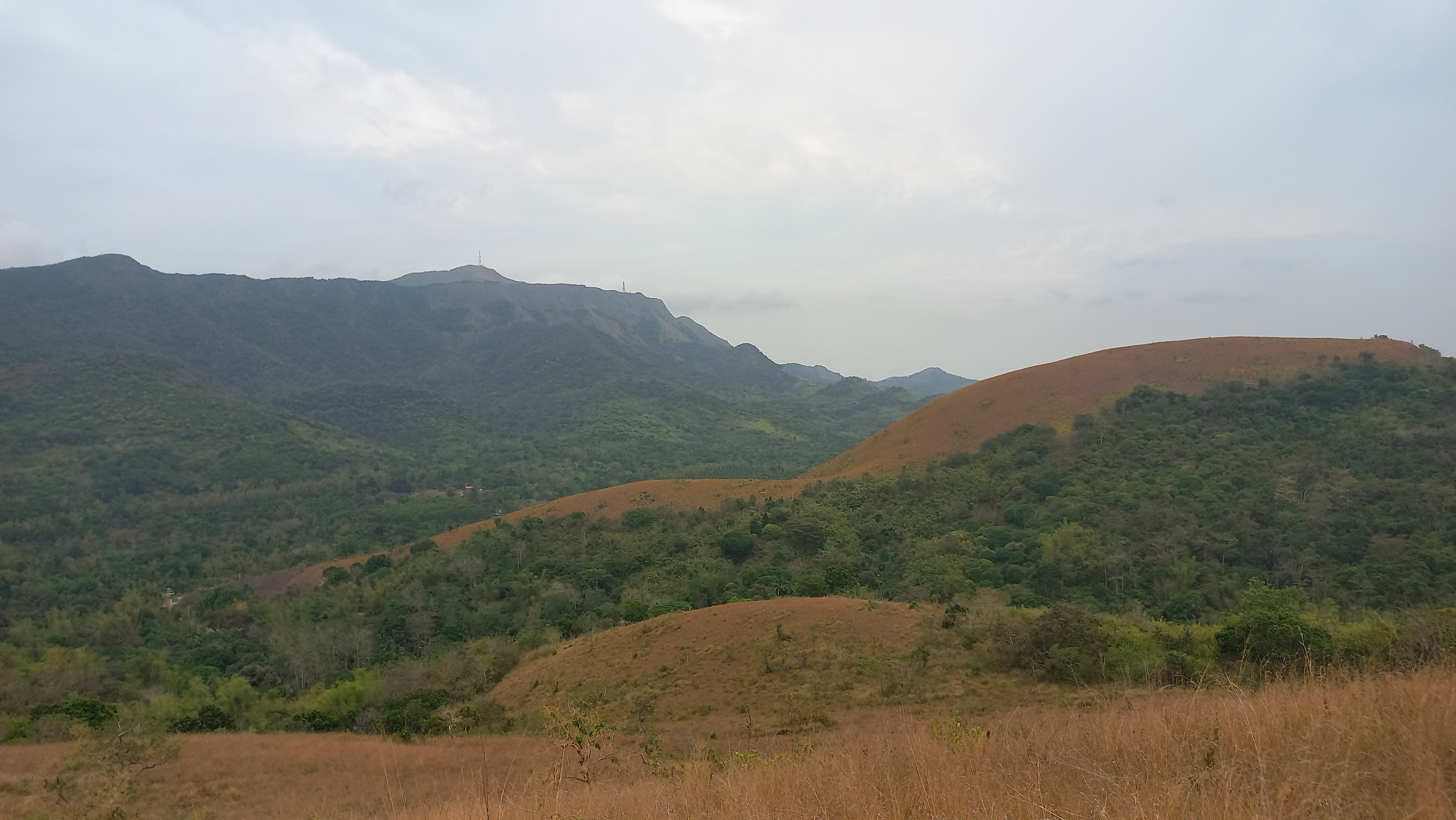
View of Mt. Dalara, the tallest mountain in Busuanga Island from Mt. Tapyas in Coron Town

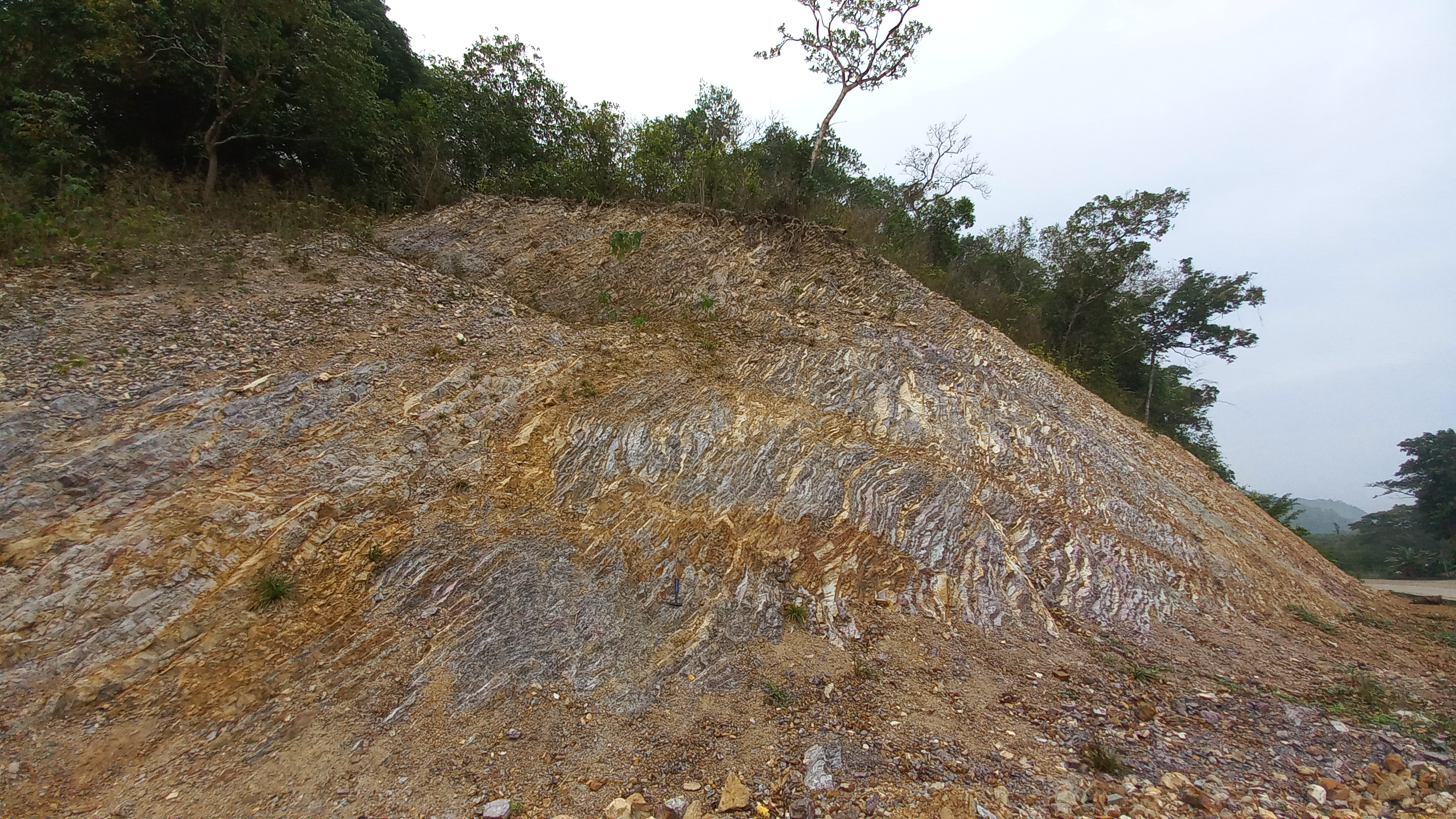
Another outcrop of heavily-deformed Liminangcong chert in Guadalupe, Coron
