= Palawanic languages =

Subgroup of the Austronesian language family

Palawanic
- Geographic distribution: Palawan, Philippines
- Linguistic classification: Austronesian: Malayo-Polynesian; Philippine; Greater Central Philippine; Palawanic
- Proto-language: Proto-Palawanic

Language codes
- Glottolog: pala1354

The Palawanic languages are a subgroup in the Greater Central Philippine-family spoken on the island of Palawan and nearby islets.

== Languages ==
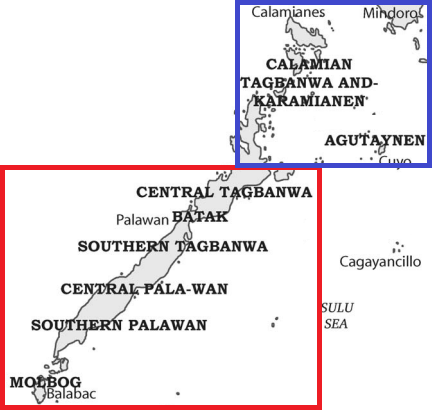
Palawanic [red] languages of Palawan

The Palawanic languages are:

- Palawano (a language cluster)
  - Brooke's Point Palawano
  - Central Palawano
  - Southwest Palawano
    - Tau't Batu
- Aborlan Tagbanwa
- Central Tagbanwa (not to be confused with Kalamian Tagbanwa)
- Batak (not to be confused with the Batak languages)

Molbog may also be in this group, closest to Palawano. Ethnologue classifies Bonggi as Palawanic.

== Reconstruction ==
Proto-Palawanic has been reconstructed by Thiessen (1980).
