= Palawan people =

Austronesian ethnic group

Palawan
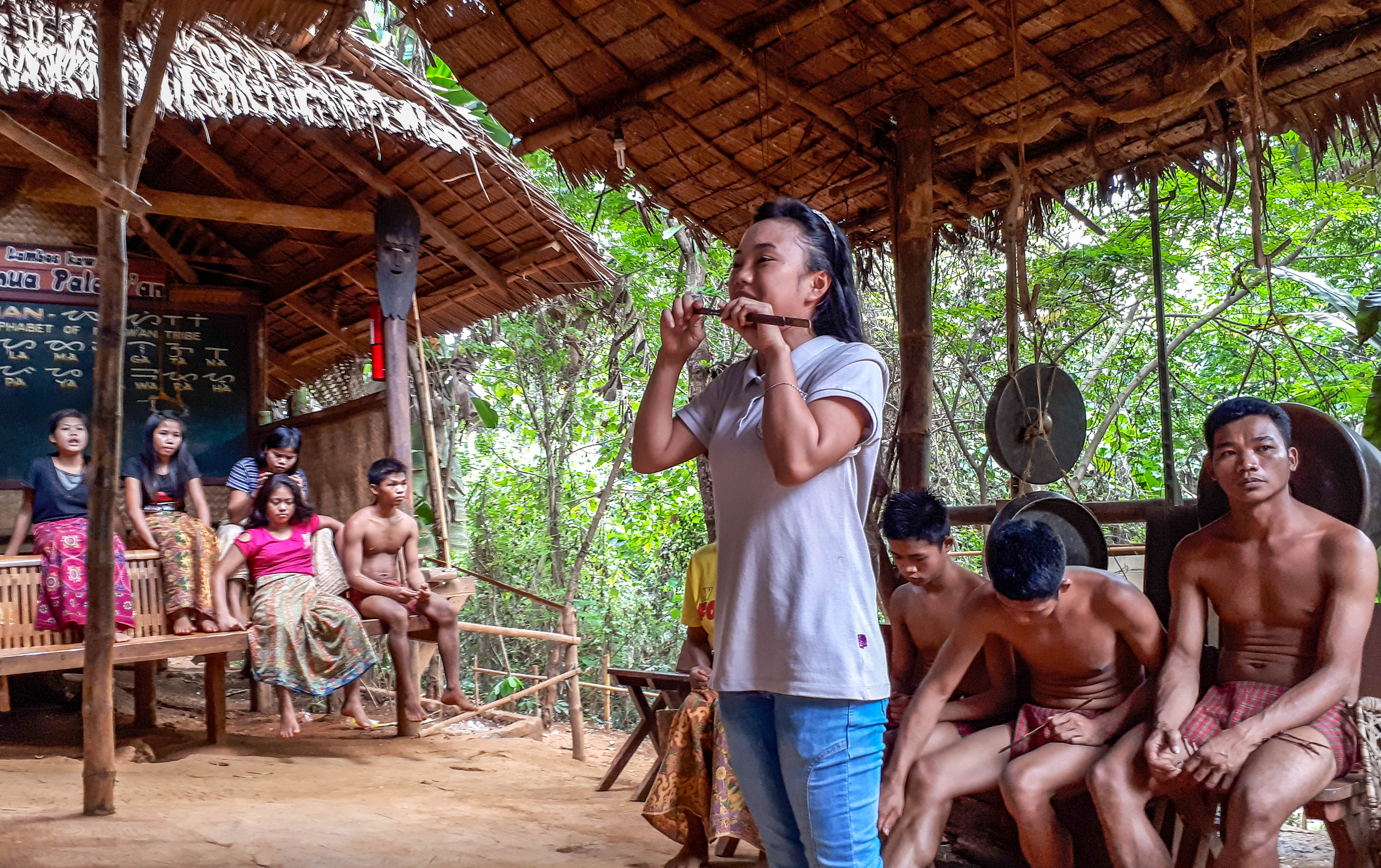
- Palaw'ans demonstrating a musical instrument.

Regions with significant populations
- Philippines: 119,857 (2020 census)

Languages
- Native; Palawano; Also; Tagalog (Palawan dialect) • Filipino • English

Religion
- Roman Catholic and traditional religion (majority); Sunni Islam (minority)

Related ethnic groups
- Others indigenous peoples of Palawan

The Palawan, also known as Palaw'an or Palawano, are an ethnic group native to the Palawan island group in the Philippines. They are the main indigenous population of Palawan. The name of the island they inhabit is named after this ethnic group.

== Classification ==
They are divided into four ethno-linguistic subgroupings. These are Quezon Palawano (Central Palawano), Bugsuk Palawano (South Palawano), Brooke's Point Palawano, and Southwest Palawano. The Quezon Palawano subgroup are found in Southern Palawan, particularly on the western section of the municipality of Quezon including the eastern part of Abo-Abo of the municipality of Sofronio Espanola, going southward down to the northern section of the municipality of Rizal. A large group of Palawans can also be found in Sitios Gugnan, Kambing, Tugpa, and Kalatabog of Barangay Panitian. The Taaw't Bato of the municipality of Rizal at the foot of Mt. Matalingahan also belongs to this same Palawan tribal group although their language is 15% different from the Quezon Palawanos.

== Description ==
The Pala'wans were originally a tribe in Southern Palawan until agrarian settlers started to occupy their once vast domain. They are divided into two sub groups namely:

1. Panimusan (Low landers) 2. Kunoy (Highlanders)

Panimusan's settled on the coastal areas. Most of them embraced the Islamic faith when the Moros from Mindanao reach their shores.

Kunoy's settled on the mountains. Taawt bato was also belongs to the group.

The tribe would exploit the most fertile piece of land and move on to next. Their family units were very small, possibly due to high mortality rates. They built their houses usually on a hillside but close to the river or stream using four skinny trunks of trees. The floor is roughly 15 to 20 feet from the ground. Families used a slanted log to climb or to enter their houses, except for single or bachelor's shanties where a suspended rope is preferred.

They hunt wild animals using spears with a lethal poison at the tip. They catch fish by using a special root sap called "Tuba" that is diluted in a shallow stream or river. The tribe hardly domesticate chicken nor hogs although dogs were their favorite pet because they can also be used in hunting. The Palawans do not usually use sea salt on their food. Their usual diet is made up of rice, banana, cassave, vegetables, rimas or breadfruit, fruits, wild pigs from hunting, birds such as wild quails and tikling, wild chicken/labuyo, and freshwater fish. They prepare a delicious festival dish called pinyaram. A rice cake fried from coconut oil and placed on top of banana leaves after cooking that is quite similar to the Tagalog's bibingka.

They were naive in socializing with their outside world, and they would welcome you with extreme precaution as they were always scared of getting sick. At the onset of this fear, they would immediately abandon their area. It is believed that they have the shortest life span of all peoples but no statistical data are however available to support this claim. They do not have a concept of year or years. When asked when were they born, they would reference it to a standing tree, explaining that they were born when a particular tree was just about a certain height.

Their choices of clothing were loincloth for men and patadyong for women or the so-called native wraps similar to the more popular malong.

One of their children's playtoys is a top that is flat, usually about a third of an inch thick that is spun on the ground using a rope of one and a half meters in length.

== Influences from agrarian settlers, government, and NGOs ==
The influx of agrarian settlers in Southern Palawan had gradually influenced the cultural orientation and some of the traditional practices of the Palawan tribe. The way they build their houses had slowly changed adopting more and more the styles of their agrarian settler neighbors. Construction materials however had remained the same. As they become aware of the concept of property rights, they started to build small villages and stopped being nomadic people resulting to little linguistical differences among villages. Studies in 1990s had identified four ethno-linguistic subgroups as mentioned above. However, more studies are needed in order to categorize each of the villages scattered in Southern Palawan. Sizes of their families remained small and life expectancy remained low. They now provide hired labor during rice planting and harvesting periods to lowland farmers. However, their main source of income is rattan gathering or production of yantok which is used in nipa weaving or in the construction of nipa houses.

The Palawans are a protected tribal people under the Strategic Environmental Plan (SEP) Law or Republic Act 7611. Section 7 of the law states:

SEP shall establish a graded system of protection and development control over the whole of Palawan, including its tribal lands, forest, mines, agricultural areas, settlement areas, small islands mangroves, coral reefs, seagrass beds and the surrounding sea. This shall be known as the Environmentally Critical Areas Network, hereinafter referred to as ECAN, and shall serve as the main strategy of the SEP. Item 4 of this section states that the ECAN shall ensure the "protection of tribal people and the preservation of their culture".

The term cultural preservation is a vague language since culture is an evolving part of human existence. Many non-government organizations also advocate the preservation of the tribal culture of Palawans. An abstract term since people always have desires for change, advancement and modernization. This puts a question on what kind of cultural preservation is under the SEP Law. It is certain that the touristic appeal of the tribal people is positively correlated with the preservation of their culture. The more they remain the way they are, the better is the province's appeal as a tourist destination. Some may view this to be unfair as it benefits the government to deny advancement or influence the tribal people not to aspire to modernize. It lowers their status as a people to merely just a tourist attraction or just a recreational resource. It contradicts the basic human tenet of equality of all peoples regardless of ethnicity or race. PCSD Resolution No. 93-38a, Resolution Adopting the Guidelines for the Identification and Delineation of Ancestral Domain and Land Claims in Palawan could grant land rights to Palawans - an incentive so they would remain indigenous.

The Palawans are a socio-economically vulnerable tribe because they still lack basic education. At present this indigenous tribe is working with anti-mining activists and environmental groups to prevent nickel mining concessions from being established in Southern Palawan.

It is apparent however that the most important things to the lives of Palawans are not being given attention especially by the government such as the need to increase their life expectancy, to provide them with proper education, and to improve their social and economic status. They needed proper clothing to protect them from the elements, medical services, potable water supply, educational services, infrastructure, and livelihood opportunities.

== Language ==
There are many linguistic variations among Palawan family groups with words changing from one valley to the next (i.e. tabon for mountain verses bukid). Tagalog is frequently used to supply words lacking in the local dialect for modern objects and actions that can cause confusion, especially among the younger generation, between Tagalog and Palawan. The more familiar a family or village is with the Tagalog lowland culture, the more common the language overlap.

== Indigenous Pala'wan religion ==
=== Immortals ===
- Empuq: the supreme deity, lord, and owner; the creator of all things in the world; also referred as Ampu, the master who wove the world and created several kinds of humanity, hence, he is also called Nagsalad (the weaver); he is a protective watching presence who lives in his abode Andunawan
- Diwata: benevolent and protective deity who stays in the median space called Lalangaw; the mediator between humans and the supreme deity
- Beljan: the spirits of all beljan (shamans); able to travel to the vertical universe, divided into fourteen different layers, in order to heal the world and to re-establish cosmic balance; also referred to as Balyan
- Lenggam: demon-like beings of the forest who act as the caretakers of poisonous and biting animals such as scorpions and snakes; also called Langgam or Saytan, they can be harmful to humans but also benevolent bringers of inspiration and knowledge
- Ampu at Paray: the master of rice
- Linamin at Barat: the lady-goddess of the monsoon winds
- Linamin at Bulag: the lady-goddess of the dry season
- Upu Kuyaw: the grandfather god of thunder

== Tau't Bato ==
The Tau't Bato (Tao't Bato, Taaw't Bato) are a subgroup of the Palawan people numbering about 500 persons still practicing a simple lifestyle who live in the area of Singnapan Valley and take shelter in the large nearby caves during the rainy season. They grow various plants with cassava as the major product. They also supplement their diet by hunting, mostly for wild pigs.
