= Central Tagbanwa language =

Austronesian language spoken in the Philippines

Central Tagbanwa
- Native to: Philippines
- Region: Palawan
- Ethnicity: Tagbanwa people
- Native speakers: (2,000 cited 1985)
- Language family: Austronesian: Malayo-Polynesian; Philippine; Greater Central Philippine; Palawanic; Central Tagbanwa
- Writing system: Tagbanwa script

Language codes
- ISO 639-3: tgt
- Glottolog: cent2090
- ELP: Central Tagbanwa

Central Tagbanwa is spoken on Palawan Island in the Philippines. It is not mutually intelligible with the other languages of the Tagbanwa people.

== Phonology ==
=== Consonants ===
Central Tagbanwa consonants
		Labial	Alveolar	Palatal	Velar	Glottal
Plosive	voiceless	p	t		k	ʔ
Plosive	voiced	b	d		ɡ	
Fricative		β	s			h
Nasal		m	n		ŋ	
Lateral			l			
Rhotic			ɾ			
Approximant		w		j		

- /t/ preceding a high front vowel /i/ is usually realized as an affricate sound [tʃ].
- /k, ŋ/ tend to shift to uvular sounds [q, ɴ] when adjacent to /a/.

=== Vowels ===
Central Tagbanwa vowels
	Front	Central	Back
Close	i	ɨ	u
Open		a	

- /ɨ/ is usually a high central vowel sound, although it is occasionally moved further back to [ɯ], or lowered to [ə].
- An [o] sound is often heard when two back vowels are adjacent to one another, or as an allophone of /u/.

== Grammar ==
=== Pronouns ===
The following set of pronouns are the personal pronouns found in the Central Tagbanwa language. Note: some forms are divided between full and short forms.

Central Tagbanwa personal pronouns
	Direct/Nominative	Indirect/Genitive	Oblique
1st person singular	ako	ko	kakɨn (kɨn)
2nd person singular	kawa (ka)	mo	kanimo (nimo)
3rd person singular	kanya	niya (ya)	kanya
1st person plural inclusive	kita	ta	katɨn
1st person plural exclusive	kami	kamɨn	kamɨn
2nd person plural	kamo	mi	kanimi
3rd person plural	tila	nila	kanila

The demonstratives are as follows.

Central Tagbanwa demonstratives
	Direct/Nominative	Indirect/Genitive	Oblique
near speaker	lito	kalito	kaito, kito
near addressee	layan	kalayan	
far away	liti	kaliti	atan, doon
