= Aborlan Tagbanwa language =

Austronesian language spoken in the Philippines

Aborlan Tagbanwa
- Native to: Philippines
- Region: Palawan
- Ethnicity: Tagbanwa people
- Native speakers: 17,000 (2005); 500 monolingual (2002)
- Language family: Austronesian: Malayo-Polynesian; Philippine; Greater Central Philippine; Palawanic; Aborlan Tagbanwa
- Writing system: Tagbanwa script

Language codes
- ISO 639-3: tbw
- Glottolog: tagb1258

Aborlan Tagbanwa is spoken on Palawan Island in the Philippines. It is not mutually intelligible with the other languages of the Tagbanwa people.

== Phonology ==
=== Consonants ===
Aborlan Tagbanwa consonants
		Labial	Alveolar	Palatal	Velar	Glottal
Plosive	voiceless	p	t		k	ʔ
Plosive	voiced	b	d		ɡ	
Nasal		m	n		ŋ	
Fricative			s			h
Lateral			l			
Rhotic			ɾ~r			
Approximant		w		j		

=== Vowels ===
Aborlan Tagbanwa vowels
	Front	Central	Back
Close	i	ɨ	u
Open		a	

== Grammar ==
=== Pronouns ===
The following table contains the pronouns found in the Aborlan Tagbanwa language. Note: some forms are divided between full and short forms.

Aborlan Tagbanwa pronouns
	Direct/Nominative	Indirect/Genitive	Oblique
1st person singular	aku	ku	aken
2nd person singular	ikaw (ka)	mu	imu
3rd person singular	kanya	ya	kanya
1st person plural inclusive	kita (ta)	tami (ta)	aten
1st person plural exclusive	kami	namen	amen
2nd person plural	kamu	mu	imyu
3rd person plural	kanya	nira	kanira
