= Kayangan Lake =

Lake in Coron Island, Philippines

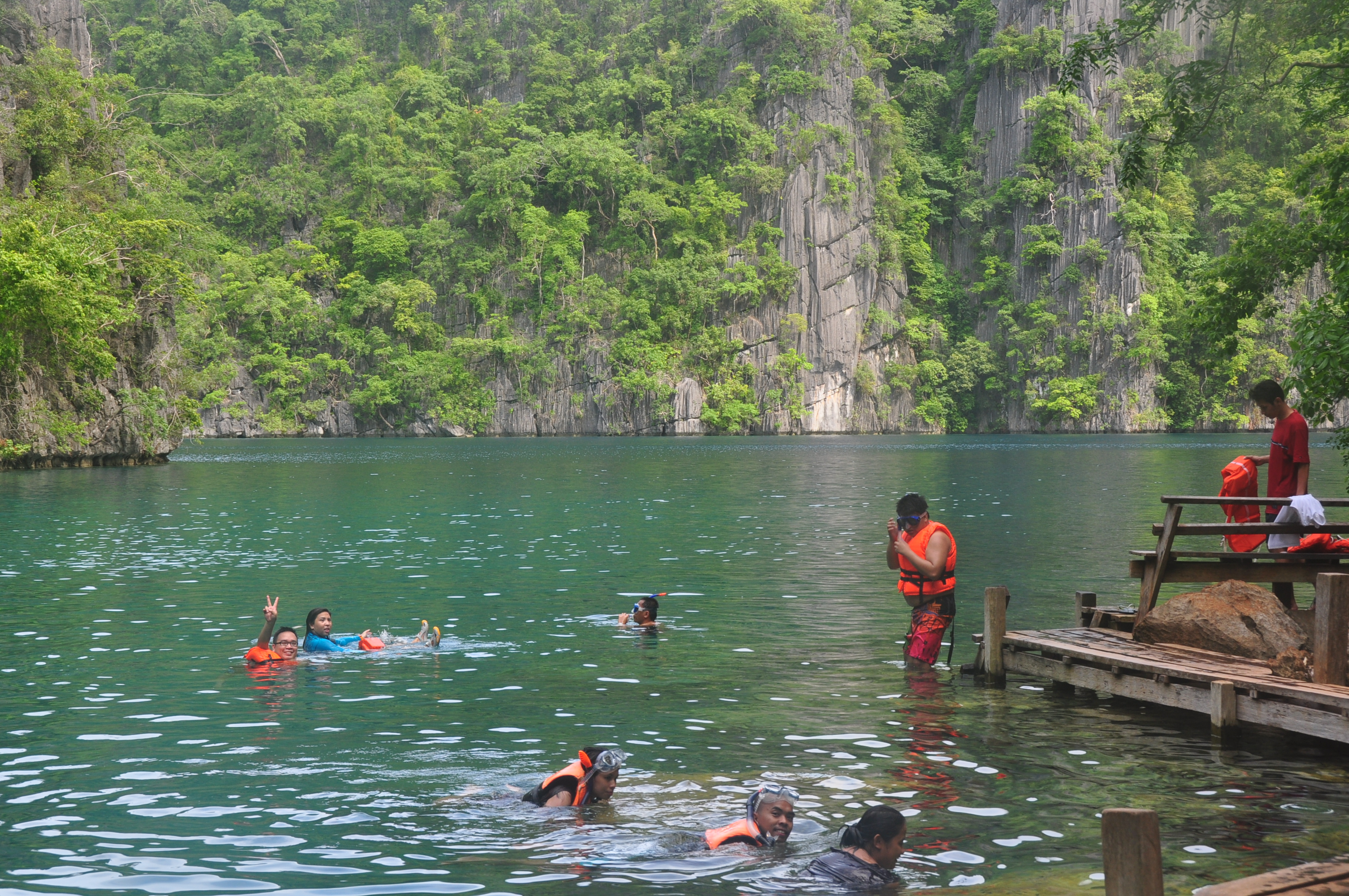
- Swimmers at the lake

- Location within Palawan Location within Philippines
- Location: Coron Island
- Coordinates: 11°57′15″N 120°13′27″E
- Max. depth: 10 m (33 ft)

Kayangan Lake is a brackish lake on Coron Island in the Philippines. Maintained by the local Tagbanwa people, the lake is one of the most popular tourist attractions on the island. It is considered as one of the cleanest lakes in the country and has been awarded the Presidential Fame of Award.

== History and activities ==
The lake is named after the local name for the red-vented cockatoo, "kayangag", and is one of thirteen lakes that are sacred to the local Tagbanwa. They believe that nature spirits lived in the lakes and that it was disrespectful to swim or fish in the waters. After more tourists began to visit the islands, the elders opened up two lakes, Kayangan Lake and Barracuda Lake for tourism in 2001. To make sure the lake was still sacred, they performed a ritual called uliwansag to get permission from the nature spirits to allow outsiders in the lake. The tribe received ancestral domain for the lake and much of the island from the government in 2002, after a long and difficult process. Accessible by boat and requiring an entrance fee, the lake is maintained by the native Tagbanwa people and became one of the most popular tourist attractions on the island.

Many tourists and visitors to the lake partake in swimming and snorkeling, though this is only permissible in certain parts of the lake. Life vests have been mandatory since two Czech tourists drowned in 2017 after freediving. Scuba diving is also restricted due to the lake's strong underwater currents. The water is additionally very clear, with the rock formations and fish under the water being visible from the surface. Guides rent bamboo rafts to tour people around the lake. The lake is surrounded by many limestone karsts and connected to Awuyuk Cave, a nearly pitch black cavern. The lake comprises 70% freshwater and 30% saltwater, and few animals are found in the lake due to the brackish water, but crabs and snails are common. One of the most common fish that can be found is the freshwater garfish.
