= Tagbanwa =

ᝦᝪᝯ
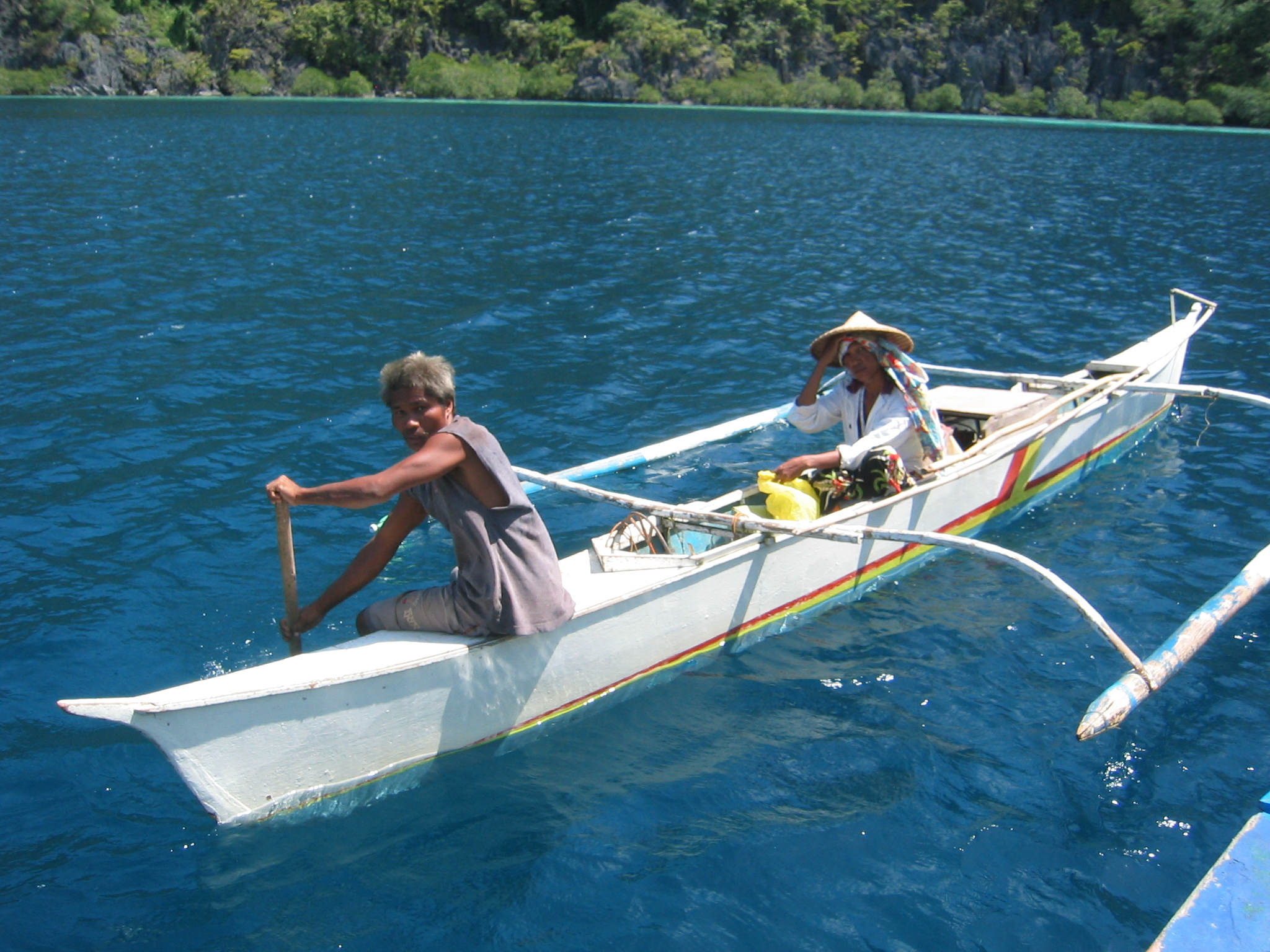
- The Tagbanwa people in Coron, Palawan

Total population
- 56,661 (2020 census)

Regions with significant populations
- Philippines (Palawan)

Languages
- Aborlan Tagbanwa, Calamian Tagbanwa, Central Tagbanwa, Cuyonon, Tagalog

Religion
- Roman Catholic, Paganism, Indigenous Tagbanwa Religion

Related ethnic groups
- other ethnic groups of Palawan, other Austronesian peoples

The Tagbanwa people (Tagbanwa: ᝦᝪᝯ) are an indigenous people and one of the oldest ethnic groups in the Philippines, mainly found in central and northern Palawan. Research has shown that the Tagbanwa are possible descendants of the Tabon Man, thus making them one of the original inhabitants of the Philippines. They are a brown-skinned, slim, and straight-haired ethnic group.

There are two major classifications based on the geographical location where they can be found. Central Tagbanwas are found in the western and eastern coastal areas of central Palawan. They are concentrated in the municipalities of Aborlan, Quezon, and Puerto Princesa. Calamian Tagbanwa, on the other hand, are found in Baras coast, Busuanga Island, Coron Island and in some parts of El Nido. These two Tagbanwa subgroups speak the same languages but different tone and pronunciation and do not exactly have the same customs. The Tagbanwa are believed to have descended from the Tabon Man, making them one of the original inhabitants of the Philippines. They have a long history of resistance against foreign invaders, from the Spanish colonial period to the American era.

They are known for their close relationship with nature, which is reflected in their beliefs and practices. They believe in a variety of spirits that inhabit the natural world, and they perform rituals to appease these spirits.

In terms of livelihood, the Tagbanwa are primarily fishermen, farmers, and gatherers. They are also skilled in weaving and pottery.

In spite of the challenges they face, such as land grabbing and the encroachment of modernization, the Tagbanwa continue to preserve their culture and traditions. They are an example of cultural diversity in the Philippines.

== History ==
According to folk history, the Tagbanwa had an early relationship with Brunei, with the first sultan of Brunyu, from the place called Burnay.

Formal history of the Tagbanwa tribe began in 1521 when Magellan's ships docked in Palawan for provisions. Antonio Pigafetta, Magellan's chronicler, recorded that the Tagbanwa practiced the ritual of blood compact, cultivated their fields, hunted with blowpipes and thick wooden arrows, valued brass rings and chains, bells, knives, and copper wire for binding fish hooks, raised large and very tame cocks for fighting, and distilled rice wine.

Until the latter part of the 17th century, southern Palawan was under the jurisdiction of the Sultan of Brunei, leading to friction between Spaniards and the Sultan. During this time, and for almost three hundred years, the Spaniards and the Muslims of Sulu, Mindanao, Palawan, and north Borneo were at war.

In the 19th century, the Tagbanwa continued to believe in their native gods. Each year, a big feast is celebrated after each harvest to honor their deities.

When the Spanish regime ended and the Americans occupied the Philippines, some changes came to the island of Palawan, and to the Tagbanwa. In 1904, Iwahig became the site of a penal colony, which displaced the Tagbanwa as it expanded. In 1910, the Americans put up a reservation for the Tagbanwa. In succeeding years, internal migration from the Visayan islands and from Luzon, the dominance of the Christian religion, and the absorption of the island into economic and political mainstream marginalized the Tagbanwa people.

== Ancestral domain ==
In 1998, the Tagbanwa of Coron Island were awarded a Certificate of Ancestral Domain Title (CADT) over more than 22,000 hectares of land and sea. CADT is the title to the land and the sea that have sustained the community for centuries. It gives the Tagbanwa the right to manage the area and preserve its rich marine and land resources.

The Coron Island Ancestral Domain of the Tagbanwa people covers the two villages of Banuang Daan and Cabugao, and the neighboring Delian Island. The ancestral domain is currently ruled by HM Tribal Chieftain Rodolfo Aguilar I, assisted by his Council of Elders.

The Calamian Tagbanwa of Coron filed the first formal legal claim in the Philippines for their "ancestral waters". The initiative also became the first ancestral waters claim to be recognized by a government. In March 2010, Tabganwas previously driven away from Calauit island were issued a CADT covering over 55,000 hectares in recognition of the communities' ancestral land and waters. The title covers the entire island and includes 50,000 hectares of ancestral waters surrounding the island.

== Culture ==
=== Language ===
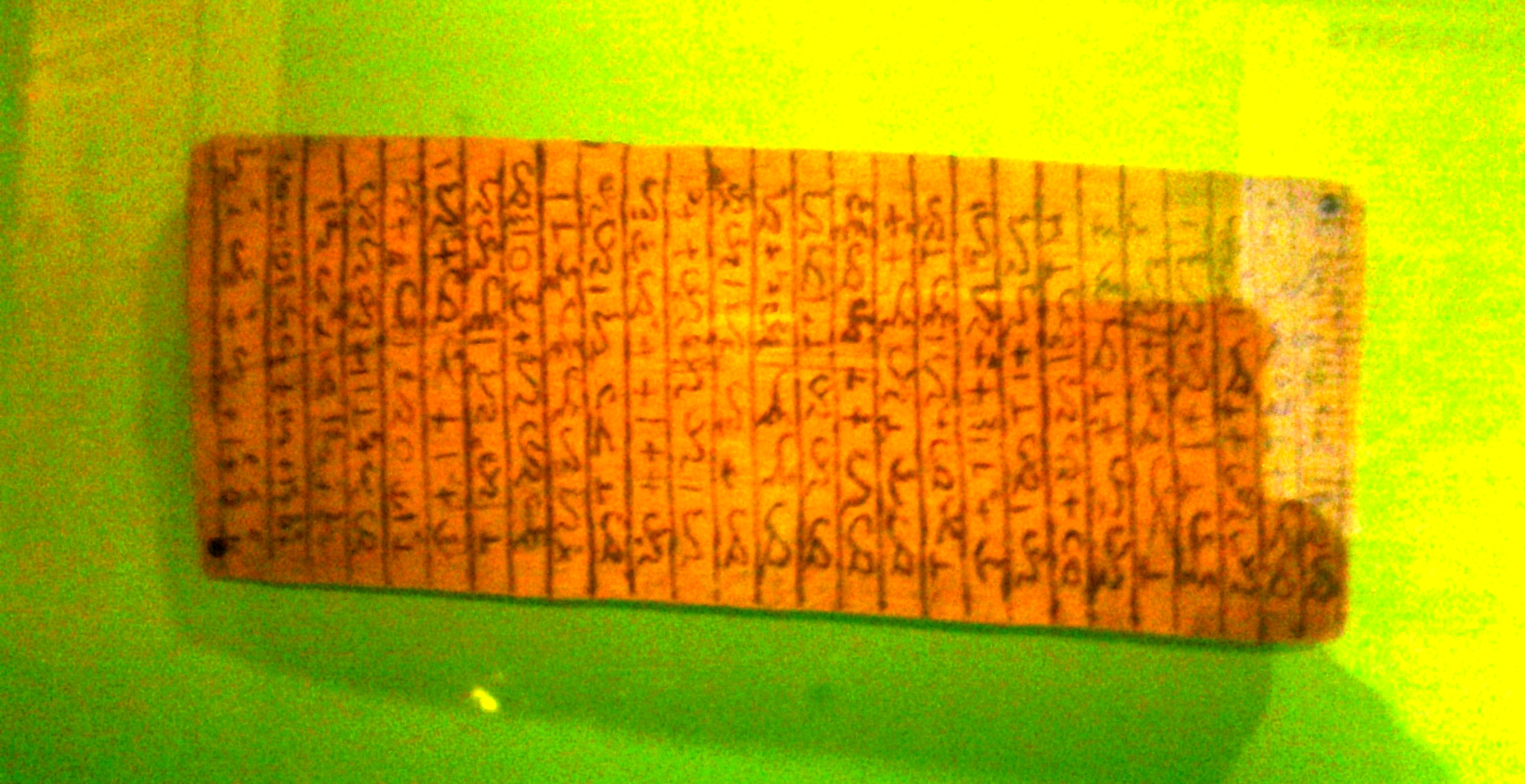
A sample of the Tagbanwa script at the Museo Palawan (Museum of Palawan).

The Tagbanwa people have their own native languages (Aborlan Tagbanwa, Calamian Tagbanwa, and Central Tagbanwa) and writing system, however, they are also proficient in speaking the Palawano language and several other dialects like Tandulanon, Silanganon, and Baras in each locality, while a significant number of them can comprehend Tagalog, Batak, Cuyonon, and Calawian languages.

=== Indigenous Tagbanwa religion ===
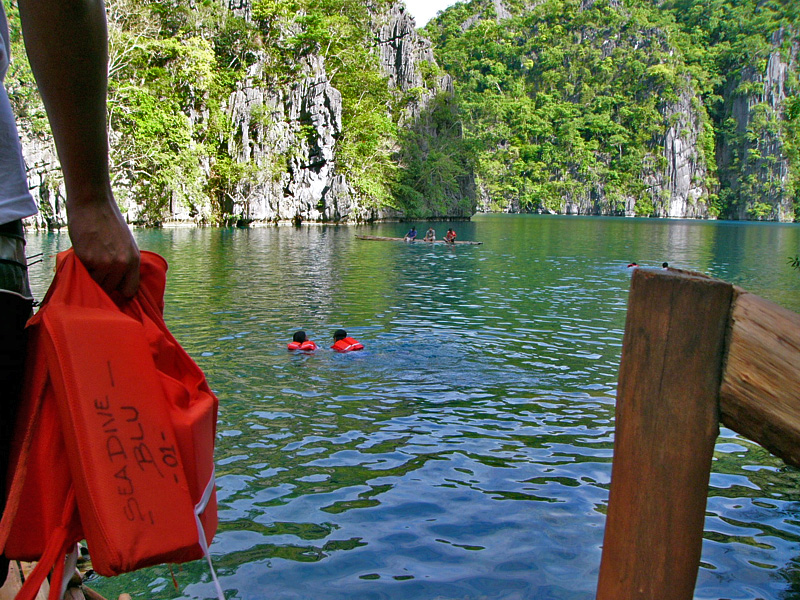
The Kayangan Lake is considered a sacred place by the Tagbanwa people.

=== Immortals ===
- Mangindusa: Also referred as Nagabacaban, the highest-ranking deity who lives in Awan-awan, the region beyond the Langit; the god of the heavens and the punisher of crime; also referred as Magindusa, the deity who gives humans their true souls called the kyaraluwa at birth, through the nose of the baby emerging from the vulva; never descends from Awan awan; he is depicted as sitting and swinging back and forth in a bintayawan
- Bugawasin: Wife of Mangindusa
- Dibuwatanin: The messengers of Mangindusa
- Tungkuyanin: Deity who sits on the edge of this sky-cover with his feet dangling into the universe; also sits looking down at the earth; if he were to raise his head and look up, he would fall into the nothingness
- Magrakad: A god found at exactly noontime on the other side of the sun; gives the warmth which sustains life and, when the people are ill, carries away sickness
- Bangkay: Spirits of the cloud region called Dibuwat; spirits of the people who have been killed by violence, poison, or those who died in giving birth
- Bulalakaw: Also called Diwata kat Dibuwat; they fly-travel throughout the cloud regions to help the people
- Polo: The benevolent god of the sea whose help is invoked during times of illness
- Sedumunadoc: The god of the earth, whose favor is sought in order to have a good harvest
- Tabiacoud: The god of the underworld in the deep bowels of the earth
- Diwata Kat Sidpan: A deity who lives in the western region called Sidpan; controls the rains
- Diwata Kat Libatan: A deity who lives in the eastern region called Babatan; controls the rain
- Tumangkuyun: Wash and keep clean the trunks of the two sacred cardinal trees in Sidpan and Babatan by using the blood of those who have died in epidemics; the blood he uses causes the colors of the sunrise and sunset
- Amyan: The hot, dry northeast winds
- Diwata katamyan: Invoked when the wet period lasts too long and these Amyan hot-dry winds are needed
- Salakap: The spirits of epidemic sickness which arrive on earth through the northwest winds
- Taliyakud: Chief god of the underworld who tends a fire between two tree trunks; asks the souls of the dead questions, where the soul's louse acts as the conscience that answers the questions truthfully; if the soul is wicked, it is pitched and burned, but if it is good, it passes on to a happier place with abundant food
- Diwata: General term for deities; they created the first man made from earth and gave him the elements of fire, the flint-like stones, iron, and tinder, as well as rice and most importantly, rice-wine, which humans could use to call the deities and the spirits of their dead

=== Family structure ===
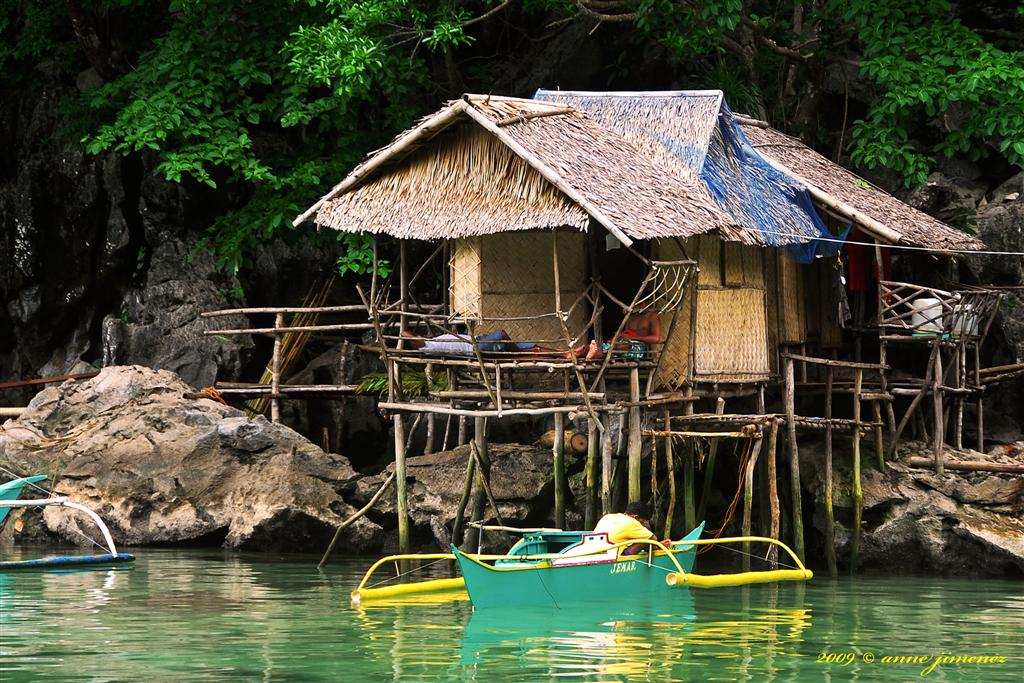
A typical Tagbanwa hut

The basic social unit of the Tagbanwas is their nuclear family composed of a married couple and their children. They are monogamous. They live in houses that are made up of bamboo and wood for a strong frame, anahaw leaves for roof and walls, and bamboo slats for the flooring. Tagbanwa live in compact villages of 45 to 500 individuals.

Families can either be free men or nobles, which, in the Southern tribes are known as Usba.

=== Visual arts and crafts ===
The traditional costumes of the Tagbanwa were fashioned from the bark of trees, particularly the salugin. The preparation of this bark was unique. After being felled, the tree would be cut around the trunk, the outer bark stripped off to expose the inner layer. A mallet would beat the layer, until it is soft enough to hang loose from the bole. This is washed and dried under the sun. In the past, menfolk wore simple loincloths, supported by a woven rattan waistband called ambalad, while women wore only brief wraparound skirts made from bark. The Tagbanua later adopt some articles of Muslim clothing. At present, while many Tagbanwa still wear their traditional apparel, western-type clothing has found its way among the people.

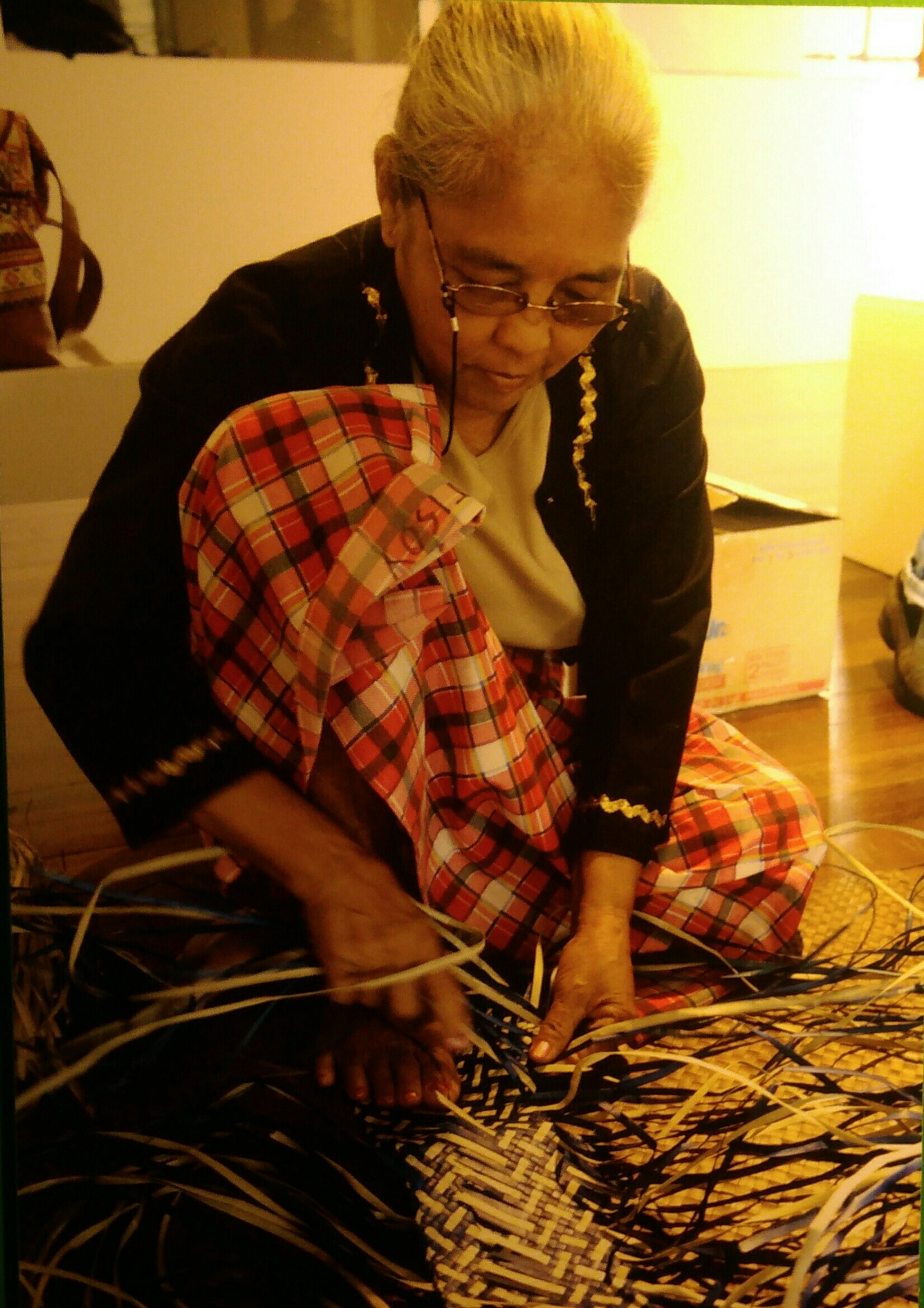
A Tagbanwa elder weaving a pandan mat.

In the past, when both men and women wore their hair long, they filed and blackened their teeth, and carved earplugs from the hardwood bantilinaw. The Tagbanwa also carved wooden combs and bracelets. They strung bead necklaces to be used in covering women's necks. Anklets of copper and brass wire were also crafted and worn by women.

Tagbanwa women wear bright body ornament and brightly colored clothes. They dress just like the non-tribe lowlanders but some elder men prefer to use G-strings for comfort while tilling the field or going fishing.

Baskets and woodcarvings are the more notable products of Tagbanwa artistic crafts today. They excel in the number of designs they apply to their tingkop (harvest basket). These baskets are made of blackened and natural bamboo, which makes the designs stand out. The cone-shaped type of basket is another fine example of Tagbanwa skilled artistry. Using black and natural color designs outside, the center of the cone has the bamboo strip skived slightly smaller, creating even holes for the screen. The funnel effect is accomplished through a close weaving of the bamboo strips towards the top.

The soft rice baskets, called bayong-bayong, are made with different unusual shapes. These have square bases and round tops. To produce interesting block and V-shapes, the plain buri sides superimposed with colored buri. Color is woven into the Tagbanwa basket with the used of dyed palm leaves.

Blackened woodcarvings of animals, with simple etched or incised features exposing the original white grain of the wood, are the most well known examples of Tagbanwa woodcarvings or sculpture.

Some of the objects carved are mammanuk (rooster), a ritual bowl, kiruman (turtle), kararaga (a native bird), dugyan (a small ground animal), lizards, and wild pigs. Carved animals are used with rice, betel nut, and other offerings to attract the deities and spirit relatives in the pagdiwata rituals. The turtles, for instance, floats on grains of palay in an ancient Ming trade bowl. Others that are not used in rituals become toys for children.

=== Performing arts ===
==== Music ====
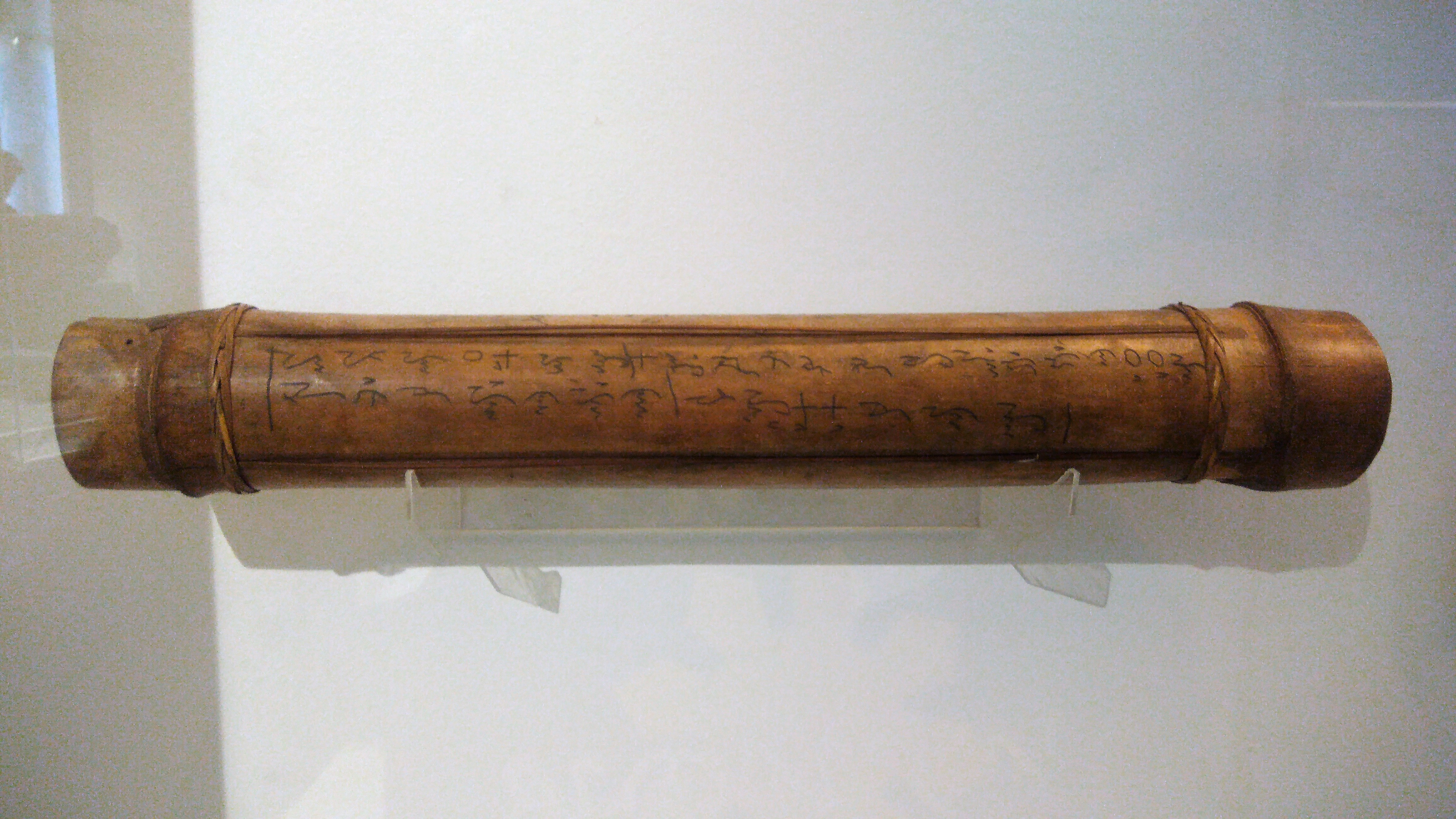
A Tagbanwa musical instrument (tube zither) made of bamboo inscribed with Tagbanwa script.

Complementing the rich Tagbanwa rituals and social gatherings in the past was an assortment of musical instruments. These included the aruding or jaw harp; the babarak or nose flute; the tipanu or mouth flute; the pagang and tibuldu, two variations of the bamboo tube zithers; the kudlung or boat lute; the gimbal or drum, whose top was made from the skin of the bayawak or monitor lizard; and the tiring, composed of lengths of bamboo with openings of various sizes producing different notes when struck with a stick. In addition, there were two generic types of gongs obtained from the shallow babandil. The mouth flute is still in use, and the gongs and drums are still played during rituals. Modern acoustic type guitar and the ukulele, which is fashioned from a half coconut shell, supplant the other instruments.

==== Dance ====
The known dances associated with the rituals are the following: abellano, also called soriano, a traditional dance performed by males; bugas-bugasan, a dance for all participants of a pagdiwata, after they have drunk the ceremonial tabad (rice wine); kalindapan, solo dance by the female babaylan and her attendants; runsay, ritual dances performed by the villagers on the seashore, where bamboo rafts laden with food offering are floated for the gods; sarungkay, a healing dance by the main babaylan as she balances a sword on her head and waves ugsang or palm leaf strip; tugatak and tarindak, dances perform by the villagers who attend an inim or pagdiwata; tamigan, performed by male combatants using round winnowers or bilao to represent shields.

The dancing accompanying the runsay, performed about midnight and lasting until daybreak, is possibly the most moving of all Tagbanwa dances, since it is a part of a sacred ritual that takes place only once a year, and is performed on the beach from where the ritual raft has been launched towards the sea world.

Guests who attend the albarka ritual watch dances such as the busak-busak, the spider dance; batak ribid, a dance simulating the gathering of camote; bungalon, a showing off dance; bugsay-bugsay, a paddle dance using fans; segutset, a courtship dance; and tarek, a traditional dance. The andardi is a festival dance of the Tagbanwa in and around Aborlan, perform at social gatherings. When dancing during a festival, the performers are dressed in their costumes, and hold in each hand a dried palm leaf called palaspas. The music of the andardi is composed of one part of twelve measures, played or sung continuously throughout the dance. Drum or gongs accompanies the music and the song.

==== Drama ====
Drama in Tagbanwa society is expressed in the mimetic dances imitating animals, such as busak-busak, and those showing occupations, such as batak ribid and bugsay-bugsay. But the most important mimetic forms are the rituals where the priestess is possessed by and plays the role of the deity to whom the offerings are being made.

== Economic activity ==
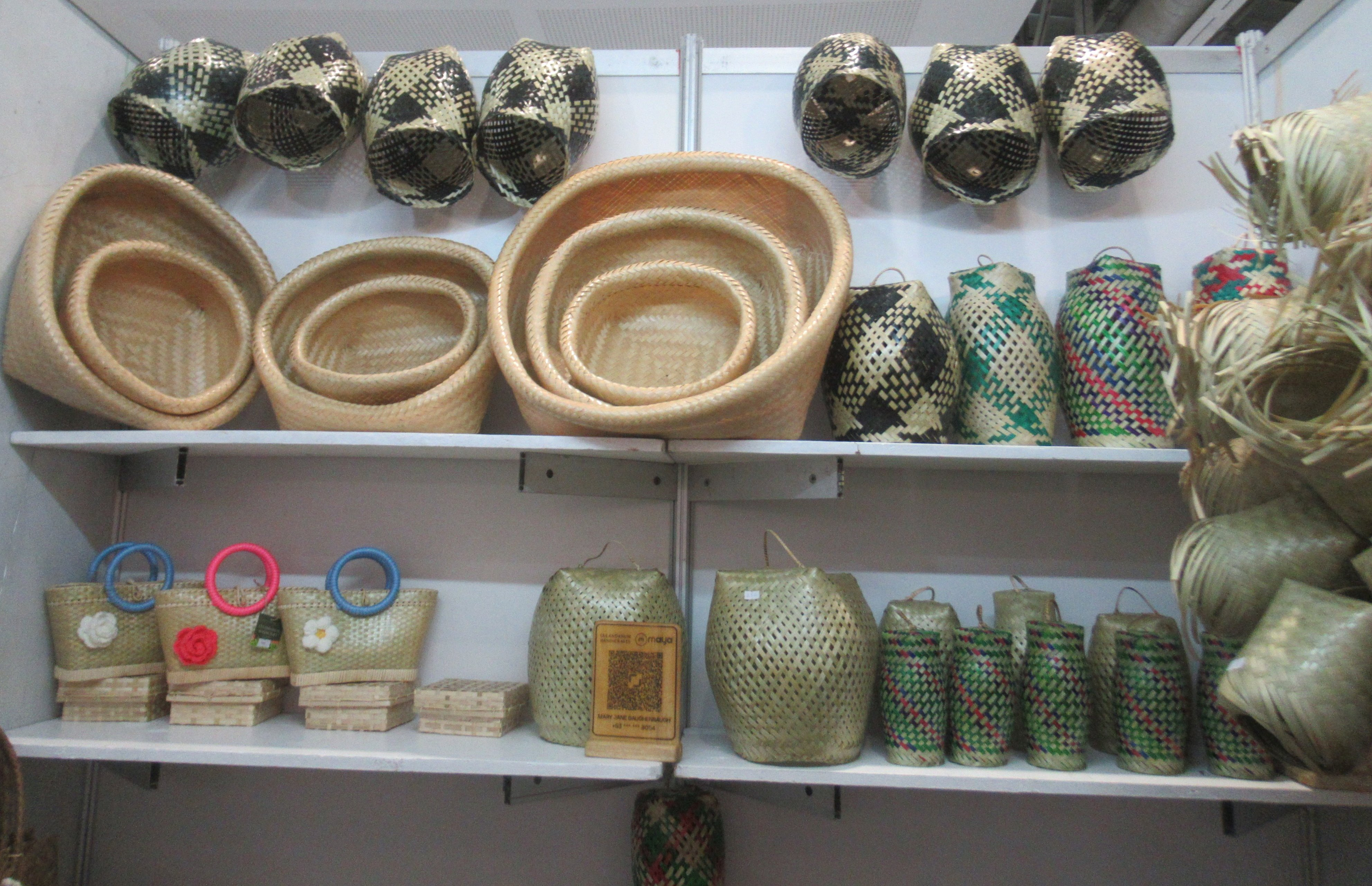
Aborlan-Puerto Princesa crafts

They cultivate rice in swidden or kaingin field that is intercropped with sweet potato, corn, and cassava. Those in the coastal areas indulge in fishing and exchange it with agricultural products for consumption. They also gather forest products such as gum, rattan, and honey for cash.

The highest potential source of income for the Tagbanwa are handicrafts particularly woodworking, mat making and basketry, the raw materials for which are readily available to them.
