= Edwin Gariguez =

Filipino religious leader and environmentalist

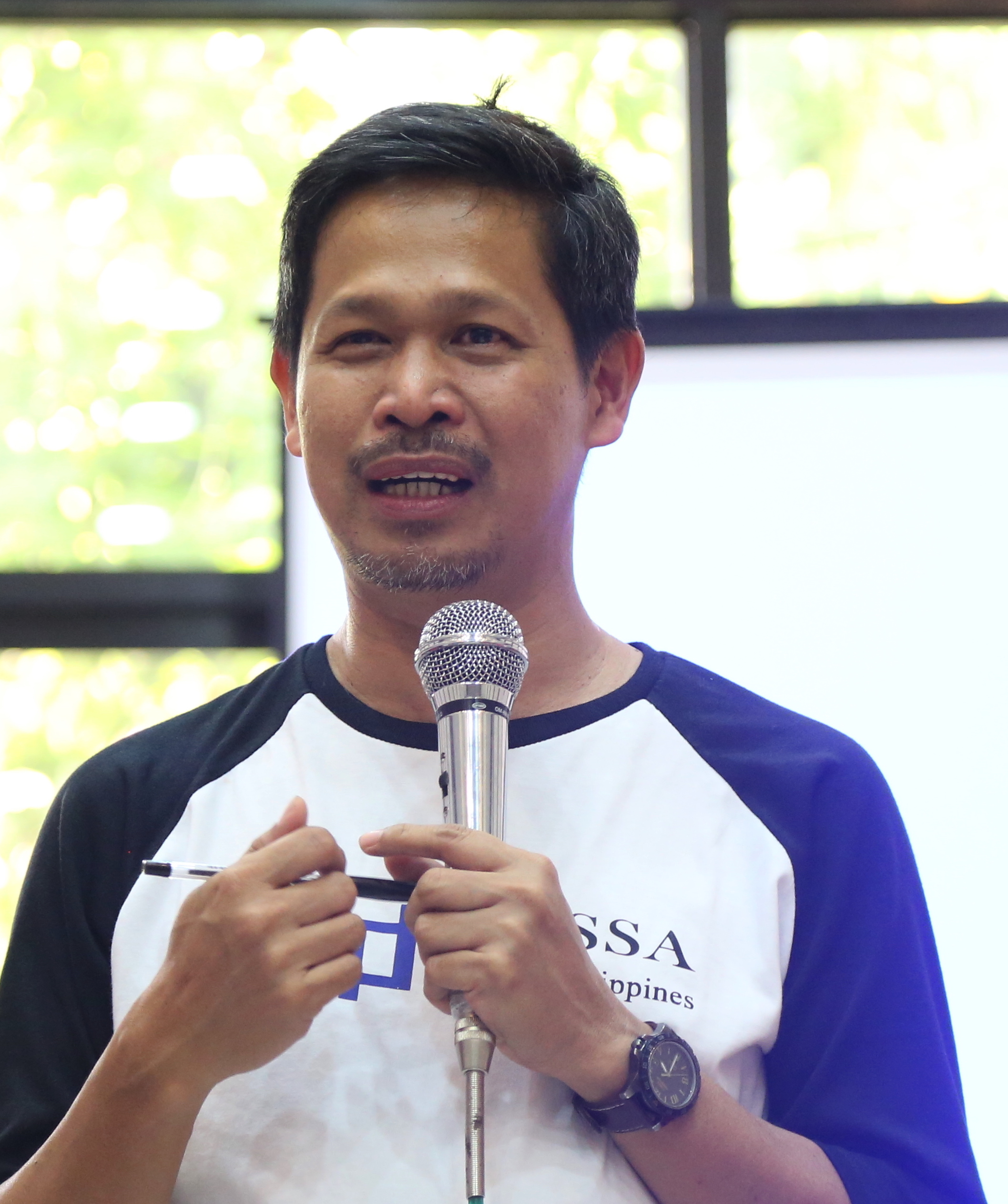
- Born: January 5, 1963 (age 63); Atimonan, Quezon
- Education: San Jose Seminary, Ateneo de Manila University
- Occupations: Religious leader and environmentalist, development worker for the Church of the Poor
- Known for: Ecospirituality, Agroecology, Integral Development, Climate Emergency, Land Rights, Renewable and Clean Energy, Rights of Nature, Indigenous Peoples' Rights, Campaign vs Mining & Extractive Industry

Edwin Gariguez (born January 5, 1963) is a Filipino Catholic priest and environmental activist. He was awarded the Goldman Environmental Prize in 2012, for his voicing of protests on behalf of Philippine indigenous peoples against large scale mining projects. Gariguez was former executive secretary of National Secretariat for Social Action (NASSA), the humanitarian, advocacy and social development arm of the Catholic Bishops' Conference of the Philippines (CBCP).

== Early Social Mission Involvement ==
Gariguez was ordained to the priesthood on April 1, 1993, being incardinated in the Diocese of Calapan in Oriental Mindoro. Along with the challenge of pursuing the agenda for being the "Church of the poor", he led the program for the major sectoral block of disadvantaged peasantry by organizing Peasant Empowerment and Advocacy Network (Peasant-Net), a provincial federation of poor farmers.

From 1998 to 2000, he took part in the campaign for transformative politics by accepting the position of executive secretary to the mayor of Victoria, Oriental Mindoro.

After his tenure in local government, he worked full-time for the Mangyan Mission, a Church-based non-governmental organisation (NGO) promoting the rights of the indigenous communities. As Advocacy Officer for the Mangyan Mission, he ran campaign programs, and empowered leaders and indigenous peoples (IP) communities to take action and effect collaborative partnerships to address critical issues affecting them, particularly their security for ancestral domain claims, and in promoting participatory and self-determined development programs for Mangyan communities. He also partnered with national and international organisations to protect indigenous peoples' rights.

== Environmental Campaign ==
With the aggressive promotion of mining in the Philippines, Gariguez worked with indigenous communities in pursuing self-determination and in ensuring their rights are respected as provided in the Indigenous Peoples' Rights Act of 1997. Part of this campaign is to oppose transnational mining companies encroaching on ancestral lands of and ecosystems. Large-scale mining, specifically the proposed Mindoro Nickel Project of Intex Resources, threatens the very survival of the indigenous peoples because a big part of the mining tenement overlaps with the ancestral domains of Alangan and Tadyawan tribes of the Mangyan.

At the national level, Gariguez is one of the convenors and member of the Council of Leaders of Alyansa Tigil Mina (ATM), a country-wide coalition of organizations and individuals from mining-affected communities, NGOs, POs, Church-based organizations and academic institutions that was formed in 2004. ATM serves as a watchdog that actively engages and challenges the government, international finance corporations, transnational mining corporations, and other key players to expose their wrongdoings and failures of laws and policies in the mining industry.

His engagement in addressing mining-related issues and campaigns is extensive. He is one of the founding members of ALAMIN (Alyansa Laban sa Mina), a provincial alliance of church, local government and civil society organizations in the island of Mindoro that waged a decade of sustained advocacy to protect the rights of the Indigenous Peoples and peasant communities to be impacted by extractive industry.

In November 2009, Gariguez and 25 members of ALAMIN launched a hunger strike before the Department of Environment and Natural Resources to protest the flawed and questionable issuance of Environmental Compliance Certificate (ECC) to the Norway-based mining company. And this effort to pressure the national government was successful and further investigation of the anomalous ECC was ordered to be conducted on the ground.

The arena of struggle for anti-mining campaign relies not only on the strength of local victories. Since the issue and the new hierarchy of power have assumed global character, the campaign necessarily has to assume global engagement. To this end, Gariguez embarked on several international lobbying and advocacy campaigns in Oslo, London and other parts of Europe.

In October 2011, Gariguez participated ima policy and performance standard review of the World Bank and International Finance Corporation in October 2010, wherein ALAMIN's experience on asserting free, prior and informed consent of the indigenous peoples was presented in a panel discussion at the World Bank headquarters in Washington, D.C..

Gariguez also collaborated with Clive Wicks and Robert Goodland in a case study on Mindoro and the impact of mining on agriculture and food security: "Philippines: Mining or Food." The full document is available at: https://web.archive.org/web/20130603000715/http://www.eccr.org.uk/module-htmlpages-display-pid-52.html

== Education ==
Gariguez entered San Jose Seminary College (Annex) and studied AB Pre-Divinity (Philosophy) at Ateneo de Manila University. He obtained his master's degree in theology from the university's Loyola School of Theology, graduating magna cum laude in 1992. He also obtained his Bachelor of Sacred Theology degree from affiliate school Fu Jen Catholic University in New Taipei City, Taiwan.

In 2005, he took up a semester of master's studies in Sociology-Anthropology in Ateneo de Manila University, transferring to Asian Social Institute (ASI) to enrol for the Doctoral Program on Applied Cosmic Anthropology (ACA). The ACA Program gives emphasis on the application of knowledge and research to the concrete social realities that students face as catalyst of development or as agents of change. Gariguez finished his PhD in 2008, with his dissertation expounding on the ecological spirituality of the indigenous peoples in Mindoro as a practical framework and alternative paradigm for sustainable development and well-being.

In 2016, Gariguez co-designed a capacity-building modular course in partnership with the Development Academy of the Philippines (DAP). He also joined the extended training program and obtained a Certificate in Productivity and Quality Management, with specialization in Community & Area Development, Resilience and Sustainability.

== Work in NASSA/Caritas Philippines ==
From 2010 to 2020, Fr Gariguez was appointed as the Executive Secretary the National Secretariat for Social Action (NASSA)/Caritas Philippines of the Catholic Bishops' Conference of the Philippines (CBCP). From November 2013 to 2017, he took responsibility for the over-all coordination of the Haiyan emergency response. NASSA/Caritas Philippines, under his leadership, had launched the most massive, far-reaching emergency, humanitarian program for the Church, with 3.2 Billion-Peso budget to sustain the rehabilitation program in 9 dioceses, for three years.

NASSA/Caritas Philippines is a national network serving the Church in its mission to be truly a Church of the Poor, implementing concrete programs and addressing pressing issues concerning the voiceless sectors and the less-privileged. NASSA, since its foundation in 1966, has been committed to carry out its mandate by underpinning sustainable development and social transformation efforts through development programs and projects that are designed to benefit the disadvantaged and the oppressed.

As development and advocacy arm of the Church, he had been involved in leading and participating in various campaigns and initiatives. His range of engagements include: partnership building, social movement mobilization, ecology and agrarian justice advocacy, Self-Help Approach in microfinance, promotion of indigenous peoples rights, community empowerment, integral and sustainable development, managing social development programs, change process management, media advocacy, climate justice, among others.

Internationally, Fr Gariguez represented Asia to the Representative Council of Caritas Internationalis in Rome, while at the same time being a member of Regional Commission for Caritas Asia from 2019 to 2020. He also served as chair for the Regional Working Group for Institutional Development and Community Strengthening (IDCS) for Caritas Asia from 2018 to 2020.

Locally, Fr Gariguez is a passionate advocate of social transformation, development issues and ecological movements, working in close collaboration with the civil society organizations. He served as convenor, member or chair of the Board of Trustees of several nation-wide organizations like Philippine Misereor Partnership, Inc. (PMPI), Alyansa Tigil Mina (ATM), Integrated Rural Development Foundation (IRDF), Center for Energy, Ecology and Development (CEED), Philippine Faith-Based Organization (FBO-PH), Shared Aid Fund for Emergency Response (SAFER), Tebtebba (Indigenous Peoples' International Center for Policy Research and Education), Ecowaste Coalition, Global Catholic Climate Movement (GCCM) and the Foundation for the Philippine Environment (FPE).

== Institutional Development and Capacity Strengthening Initiatives ==
In 2016, Fr Gariguez initiated a national program called "Lead To Heal" as a strategy for capacity building of the pastoral workers of the Church in the Philippines. This program was in partnership with the Development Academy of the Philippines and Future by Design - Pilipinas. During his term, NASSA/Caritas Philippines has attained a milestone in upscaling its humanitarian competence and global engagements locally and even globally. But the capacity strengthening strategy has to reach the level of the diocesan partners. It is to this end that the program aimed to provide technical expertise to improve the competences of the dioceses in doing development-sector-based engagements, humanitarian response, climate change adaptation and environment sustainability- driven development works and advocacy actions.

In 2018, Fr Gariguez, with encouragement and support from Caritas PH Board of Trustees, founded the Center for Resiliency, Empowerment and Integral Development (CREED), dubbed as the "social action academy" in the Philippines, envisioned to develop the required professionalism, leadership and pastoral competence among the diocesan social action workers.

== Present Engagement ==
In July 2020, he resigned as Executive Secretary of NASSA/Caritas Philippines and returned to Oriental Mindoro where he now works as Social Action Director for the Apostolic Vicariate of Calapan and Development Program Support Coordinator for the Mangyan Mission. Concurrently, he is also teaching Ecological Philosophy at St. Augustine College Seminary.

== Major Writings, Papers and Publications ==
“Harnessing Multi-stakeholder Mechanisms to Promote Global Environmental Priorities at the Local Level: The Case of Naujan Lake National Park.” In Taking the People's Road: Bold Experiments in Making Participatory Governance Work. (1997)

“Social Movement and the Struggle Against Globalized Mining: A Case Study of the Mindoro Nickel Project,” paper presented to the Department of Sociology and Anthropology, Ateneo de Manila University. (2003)

Articulating Mangyan-Alangans’ Indigenous Ecological Spirituality as Paradigm for Sustainable Development and Well-Being. (2008). Unpublished Dissertation, Asian Social Institute.

Alangan Mangyan of Mindoro. (2009). National Commission for Culture and the Arts (NCCA).

Mindoro Campaigns: Protecting Island Ecology, Defending Peoples’ Rights. (2012). National Secretariat for Social Action (NASSA).

“Peace and Resource Conflict: Mining and Philippine Church Experience,” paper delivered on the occasion of the 50th Anniversary of Pacem in Terris, at the Vatican City, Rome. (2013).

“Community Organizing for Environmental Defense,” case study on community organizing commissioned for documentation by CODE-NGO. (2013)

“Ecological Spirituality, Culture and Development: Approaches and Methodologies in Doing Dialogic Research,” In Unsettling Discourses: The Theory and Practice of Indigenous Studies. Cordillera Studies Center. (2014)

"The Challenge for Vatican II Renewal – From Anthropocentrism to Ecological Spirituality," paper delivered for the Forum on Church and Ecology, De La Salle University. (2014)

“Market Economy and the Process of Cultural Redefinition in Mangyan Society,” BAYBAYIN vo1, no.1, pp. 90–103. (2015)

Ecological Spirituality and the Mangyan Alangans of Mindoro. (2017). National Secretariat for Social Action (NASSA).

“Localization and Partnership Building in Haiyan Response,” research documentation report submitted to Caritas Asia for Localization Forum in Bangkok, January 27, 2020.

== Awards ==
2012 Goldman Prize Award, Island and Islands Nations

Awarded by the Xavier University, Ateneo de Cagayan the Honoris Causa: Doctor of Philosophy on March 12, 2016,

Awarded by the Earth Day Jam Foundation the GAIA Award in April 2016

== Link ==
Goldman Environmental Prize Award

Philippine Campaign for Clean Energy

TEBTEBBA Indigenous Peoples' International Center for Policy Research and Education

ALYANSA TIGIL MINA (ATM)
