= Hanunoo =

Hanunoo may refer to:

- Hanunó'o language, spoken by Mangyans in the Philippines
- Hanunó'o script, used to write the Hanunó'o language.
- Hanunoo (Unicode block)
