= Tawbuid language =

Austronesian language spoken in the Philippines

Tawbuid
- Native to: Philippines
- Region: Mindoro
- Native speakers: (14,000 cited 2000)
- Language family: Austronesian: Malayo-Polynesian; Philippine; Greater Central Philippine; South Mangyan; Tawbuid

Language codes
- ISO 639-3: Either: bnj – Eastern Tawbuid twb – Western Tawbuid
- Glottolog: bata1318

The Tawbuid language is a language spoken by Tawbuid Mangyans in the province of Mindoro in the Philippines. It is divided into eastern and western dialects. The Bangon Mangyans also speak the eastern dialect of Tawbuid.

== Geographic distribution ==
The Tau-buid (or Tawbuid) Mangyans live in central Mindoro.

In Oriental Mindoro, Eastern Tawbuid (also known as Bangon) is spoken by 1,130 people in the municipalities of Socorro, Pinamalayan, and Gloria.

In Occidental Mindoro, Western Tawbuid (also known as Batangan) is spoken by 6,810 people in the municipalities of Sablayan and Calintaan.

== Phonology ==
=== Western Tawbuid ===
==== Vowels ====
	Front	Central	Back
Close	i	ɨ	u
Mid	e		ɔ
Open		a	

==== Consonants ====
		Labial	Alveolar	Palatal	Velar
Nasal		m	n		ŋ
Plosive	voiceless	p	t		k
Plosive	voiced	b	d		g
Fricative		f	s		
Liquid	lateral		l		
Liquid	flap		ɾ		
Approximant		w		j	

==== Historical comparison ====
Comparison with related languages shows a gradual loss of /k/ > /h/ > /Ø/. For example:

Tagalog: ako, > Buhid: aho > Tawbuid: au 'I'
kami > hami > ami 'we'

There is a residual /k/ in the 1st person singular, in the affix /ak-/, usually shortened in speech to /k-/. E.g. kadasug kban (or akban) 'I will arrive.'

==== Glottals ====
There are no glottal phonemes, either /h/ or /ʔ/, in Tawbuid.

The glottal stop [ʔ] may be realized between adjacent identical vowels. Normally though, in connected speech, two adjacent vowels are either merged to form a lengthened vowel or differentiated by stress. For example:

fakafanyuun 'love' may be pronounced /fakafanyu'ʔun/ or /fakafan'yu:n/
fagfanyaan 'waiting place' /fakfanya'ʔan/ or /fakfan'ya:n/
naali 'dug' /na'ali/ or /na'ʔali/

Notice that in the above, the stress precedes the glottal, whereas without a glottal, the stress is in the normal position for that particular stress pattern. Vowels following /i/ and /u/ offer different interpretations as to whether a linking /y/ or /w/ is present. For example:

siu or siyu 'elbow'
tua or tuwa: grammatical marker

==== Assimilation ====
There is a remarkable absence of assimilation at the point of articulation of nasals with following sounds. For example:

lanbung 'shade, clothing' (rather than */lambung/) (cf. Tagalog: lambung)
sangdaw 'animal trap' (not */sandaw/)
angru 'dried bulu (kind of bamboo)' (not */anru/)
anbul 'taken, died' (not */ambul/)

==== Description of phonemes ====
/i/ close front spread

occurs syllable-initial, middle and final
idu 'dog'
lino 'lake, sea, body of water'
katsi 'now, today'

/e/ half close front spread

Established as a phoneme in contrast with /i/ by minimal pairs

lili 'said while tickling pig'
lele 'tongue'
liplip 'blink eyes, flash light'
leplep 'tongue'

Occurrence in similar environment:

seud 'steam or boil to cook'
siun 'right-hand side'

Historically this was most likely /ay/. It is a common occurrence in languages around the world for /ay/ to become /e/, as in French and English. (Tagalog also exhibits this trend, with may being pronounced /me/ in connected speech.) Comparison of Tawbuid with related languages shows this:

wase 'axe', cf. other dialects, including Alangan, Ilocano: wasay
sunge 'horn', cf. Tagalog sungay
abe 'winged bean' cf. Iraya abay.

Within Tawbuid, /ay/ and /e/ alternate with different grammatical forms of the same word.

sable 'cross a hill'
sablayan 'the place where you arrive after crossing a hill'
-duge 'a long time' (root word)
kadugean or kadugayan 'elapsed time'

/a/ open central unrounded

Vowel which occurs in syllable-initial, mid and final positions.

amlung 'species of vine'
ban 'species of tree'
fana 'arrow'

/o/ half-open back rounded

Established as a phoneme in contrast with /u/ by minimal pairs

biu 'species of shell'
bio 'eagle'
susu 'breast'
soso 'rinsed nami'

As with /e/, this is probably a historical development of /aw/. A similar process occurred in English and French.

o 'you (singular)' cf. Buhid haw
ano 'fan palm' cf. Tagalog anahaw
fiso 'bush knife' cf. Alangan, Indonesian, pisaw

/u/ close back rounded

Syllable-initial, middle and final

u 'fingernail, toenail'
ugak 'crow'
fagut 'tame'
alu 'mortar'

/ɨ/ close central unrounded

Syllable-initial, middle and final

vtv 'immediate, subsequent'
gvnas 'pull leaves off stalk'

In orthography, the letter v is used. In the 1950s when the Reeds started writing the language, that was a convenient (and unused) letter on the typewriter. It is the least frequent vowel (>1%), and in fact the least frequent phoneme (>0.5%) in the language. It mostly occurs with /a/ or /ɨ/ in an adjacent syllable. In all but one word (tibanglvn) /a/ and /ɨ/ are the only vowels used. (One exception noted: the name of a river near Tundayaw is Guribvy.)

/b/ voiced bilabial plosive

Syllable-initial and final. For example:

bio 'eagle'
kalub 'fall face down'

/p/ voiceless bilabial plosive

Environment: syllable-initial (but rare word-initial) and final

Variants: [p] voiceless unaspirated bilabial plosive

Environment: syllable-initial

patuy 'compressed lump of soaked nami'
paras 'small mouse species'
agipan 'scorpion'
apalya 'ampalaya, bitter gourd'
napsug 'full, satisfied with food'

[pʰ] voiceless slightly aspirated bilabial plosive

Environment: word-final

tap 'number'

/p/ is established as a phoneme in contrast with /f/ by the following:

There is at least one minimal pair:

tapi 'count (imperative)', from root tap plus suffix -i
tafi 'slash, chop mark from a knife'

/p/ is in contrastive distribution with /f/ under the following circumstances:

/f/ is never syllable-final, but /p/ can be.
/f/ cannot be followed by /ɨ/, but /p/ frequently is. (e.g./yapvs/ 'skin boil', /yafus/ 'cockroach')

/d/ voiced alveolar plosive

Syllable-initial and final.

dufa 'armspan'
galiad 'have a cut under one's toe'
baladbad 'woodpecker'

Realised as [t] before voiceless consonants, most frequently in the verb form CVd-root-an.

/kadkafanyu'an/ > [katkafanyu'an] 'loving one another'

/t/ voiceless alveolar plosive

Environment: syllable-initial and final

Variants:

[t] voiceless unaspirated alveolar plosive

Environment: syllable-initial

take 'arm'
makatu 'able'
[tʰ] voiceless slightly aspirated (or released without aspiration) plosive

Environment: word-final

mabiat 'heavy'
meut 'vegetation'

/g/ voiced velar plosive

Environment: syllable-initial and final, or initial cluster.

gewan 'come here'
ragbas 'cut grass'
salug 'floor'

Realised as [k] before voiceless consonants, for example in the verb prefix g-, and prefixes tag-, fag-.

/gted/ > [kted] 'holding'
/'gfili/ > ['kfili] 'choosing'
/tagti'ug/ > [takti'ug] 'the one who is sleeping'

/k/ voiceless velar plosive

Environment: syllable-initial and final

[k] voiceless unaspirated bilabial plosive

Environment: syllable-initial

kesug 'love, cherish'
nasuksuan 'hidden'

[kʰ] voiceless slightly aspirated plosive

Environment: word-final

sinduk 'peck'
atsik 'click'

There is a tendency for the initial /k/ to be lost in Tawbuid compared to similar words in related languages. For example:

Tag. kasalanan > Tb. asalanan 'sin'
Tag. Kinarawan > Tb. Inaruan 'river name'
Tag. katay > Tb. ate 'kill' (root word)

/f/ voiceless labiodental fricative

Environment: syllable-initial only. See comments on /p/ for contrastive features.

faglon 'second most recently born child in a family'
fatfat 'thrash around'

Rare in Austronesian languages. Historically related to Tagalog and other Philippine languages. /p/. For example:

afuy 'fire' (Tagalog: apoy)
fana 'arrow' (Tagalog: pana)
fag grammatical linker (other Mangyan languages except Buhid, pag)

/s/ voiceless alveolar fricative

Can occur in all syllable positions, and in the initial consonant cluster /st/. The affricate /ts/ is treated as a unit rather than two successive consonants.

/m/ bilabial nasal

Can occur in all syllable positions.

/n/ dental nasal

Environment: syllable-initial and final and syllabic

nanan 'cooked sweet potato'
ntama [n'tama] 'cooked'

/ŋ/ velar nasal

Environment: syllable-initial and final and syllabic

ngenge 'baby, youngest child in family'
song 'cough'
ngurang [ŋ'guraŋ] 'matured, grew up'

/l/ voiced alveolar palatalized lateral

Environment: syllable-initial and final

laman 'so that, in order to'
menal 'bitter, astringent tasting'

/R/ voiced alveolar flap

Environment: syllable-initial and (rarely) final

ria 'ginger'
makerker 'shoddy'

/w/ voiced bilabial approximant

Environment: syllable-initial and final

waswas 'chop with knife'
taw 'person'
madaylaw 'tiring'

/y/ voiced palatal approximant

Environment: syllable-initial and final

yukyuk 'kind of spirit'
sumyu 'finger, toe'
advy 'expression of pain'

Stress patterns

Primary stress in Tawbuid is either final or penultimate. Most words are stressed unpredictably, and in some speakers, all syllables seem to be equally stressed. Modification in stress occurs in affective speech (see below).

Some syllable patterns have predictable stress. A word containing two adjacent syllables with CVC patterns are stressed on the second of those two syllables, whether final or not.

/nabag'bag/ 'attacked with knife'
/bulat'lat/ 'species of grass'
/fag'lon/ 'second most recently born child'
/fan'dagum/ 'charm made of resin'
/kafan'donan/ 'night is falling'

Words with two identical CVC patterns interrupted by /-ar-/ or /-al-/ are also stressed on the second of those two CVC syllables.

/falung'fung/ 'sapling'
/balang'bang/ 'thigh'

Where the final and penultimate syllables are open, and the vowels are the same, the stress is penultimate.

susu 'breast'
lele 'tongue'
langipi 'wasp species'
gigi 'dent'
soso 'rinsed nami'
vtv 'immediate'

But when the vowels are different, stress can occur unpredictably.

final: /nla'fi/ 'flattened'
penultimate: /'lafi/ 'shoulder'
final: /a'fuy/ 'fire'
penultimate: /'kafuy/ 'cry noiselessly in sleep'

A root word can change its stress when affixes are added, because affixes carry their own inherent stress.

/'sadi/ 'one' (penultimate)
/ma'sadi/ 'united' (penultimate)
/fagmasadi'un/ 'unity' (final)
/namasadi'an/ 'agreement' (final)

In affective speech (utterances in which the speaker wishes to convey emotion), lengthening may change stress:

/na'taw/ 'what?' may become /:na:taw/ when said with rising pitch on the first syllable and low pitch on the second. This indicates acute surprise.

Secondary stress and tertiary stress

In words of more than three syllables there is a secondary and even a tertiary stress.

/²fagma³balyan¹anun/ 'power'
/³fag²kedkesu¹ganun/ 'mutual love'

Accent

Within the Western Tawbuid region, there are distinctive accents as well as vocabulary preferences. Taking the rebuke lag katanya 'don't do that':

Balani: mid, mid, mid-to-high rising, low.
Lagutay: mid-low falling, mid, mid-low falling, mid-low falling
Anawin: mid, mid, mid-semitone higher, mid.

A rebuke or any utterance conveying a negative emotion is frequently said with lips rounded throughout.

Syllable patterns

V

Monosyllabic words are: e, o, u

Some words beginning with a vowel have a V syllable-initial pattern.

alu, ogo, umu, vtv 'pestle', 'water-skater', 'royal jelly', 'immediate, subsequent'

V-CV

emad, ifag 'louse', 'sister/brother-in-law' V-CVC

C – in the case of the completed aspect prefix /n-/

ndasug 'arrived' C-CV-CVC

VC

agbvt, 'great, large' VC-CVC
amlung 'species of vine'
ekwan 'share of harvest'

CVC

ban 'species of tree' CVC
dot 'species of snake'
tap 'number'
faglon 'second youngest child' CVC-CVC
fadeg 'field' CV-CVC

CCV

ste 'here' CCV
glo, gbul 'going', 'getting' CCV
tsiuy 'there' CCV-VC

CVC with semivowels

inday 'which?' VC-CVC
araw 'forest' V-CVC
fuyfurit 'species of bat' CVC-CV-CVC
baybay 'plentiful' (root) CVC-CVC
