= Buhid =

Buhid may refer to:

- Buhid language, Austronesian language of the Philippines
- Buhid script, its script
- Buhid (Unicode block)
