= Iraya =

Iraya can refer to:

- Iraya people, an ethnic group of the Mangyan people
- Iraya language, spoken by Mangyans in the province of Mindoro in the Philippines.
- Iraya Robles, a queercore musician with band Sta-Prest
- Mount Iraya, a volcano in the Philippines
