= Mindanao languages =

Language family

Mindanao
- Southern Philippine
- (obsolete)
- Geographic distribution: Mindanao
- Linguistic classification: Austronesian: Malayo-Polynesian; Philippine; Greater Central Philippine; Mindanao
- Subdivisions: Manobo; Danao; Subanon

Language codes
- Glottolog: None

The Mindanao or Southern Philippine languages are an obsolete proposal for a subgroup of the Austronesian languages comprising the Danao languages, the Manobo languages and Subanon, all of which are spoken in Mindanao, Philippines.

Blust (1991) includes the three groups as separate branches in a larger Greater Central Philippine subgroup (together with the Central Philippine, Southern Mindoro, Palawan and Gorontalo–Mongondow branches), and there is no evidence that they are more closely related to each other than to the other branches of the Greater Central Philippine subgroup.
