= Northern Mindoro languages =

Subgroup of the Austronesian language family

Northern Mindoro
- North Mangyan
- Geographic distribution: Mindoro
- Linguistic classification: Austronesian: Malayo-Polynesian; Philippine; Central Luzon (?); Northern Mindoro

Language codes
- ISO 639-3: –
- Glottolog: nort2873

The Northern Mindoro (North Mangyan) languages are one of two small clusters of languages spoken by the Mangyan people of Mindoro Island in the Philippines.

The languages are Alangan, Iraya, and Tadyawan.

There is some evidence that points at a closer relationship of the Northern Mindoro languages with the Central Luzon languages. Both branches share the phonological innovation Proto-Austronesian *R > /y/ and some common lexical items such as *ʔakit 'to see', *dimla 'cold'.

== See also ==
- Southern Mindoro languages
- Ratagnon language
