= Batangan language =

Batangan may refer to:

- One of the South Mangyan languages
- Batangas Tagalog
