= Buhid script =

Writing system

Buhid ᝊᝓᝑᝒ
- Script type: Abugida
- Period: c. 1300–present
- Direction: Left-to-right
- Languages: Buhid, Tagalog

Related scripts
- Parent systems: Proto-Sinaitic alphabet: Phoenician alphabet; Aramaic alphabet; Brāhmī; Pallava; Old Kawi; Baybayin; Buhid
- Sister systems: Philippines: Hanunó'o script; Kulitan script; Baybayin; Tagbanwa script; Indonesian Archipelago: Balinese script; Batak script; Javanese script; Lontara script; Sundanese script; Rencong script; Rejang script

ISO 15924
- ISO 15924: Buhd (372), Buhid

Unicode
- Unicode alias: Buhid
- Unicode range: U+1740–U+175F

Surat Buhid is an abugida used to write the Buhid language. As a Brahmic script indigenous to the Philippines, it is closely related to Baybayin and Hanunó'o. It is still used today by the Mangyans, found mainly on island of Mindoro, to write their language, Buhid, together with the Filipino Latin script.

There are efforts to reinvigorate the use of Surat Buhid. Buhid script use varies across Northern (Bansud area) and Southern Buhid (Bongabong) communities.

== Structure ==
The Buhid script has 18 independent characters; 15 are consonants and 3 vowels. As an abugida, there are additional diacritic vowels. Consonants have an inherent /a/ vowel. The other two vowels are indicated by a diacritic above (for /i/) or below (for /u/) the consonant. Depending on the consonant, ligatures are formed, changing the shape of the consonant-vowel combination. Vowels at the beginning of syllables are represented by their own, independent characters. Syllables ending in a consonant are written without the final consonant.

Buhid syllables
vowels		consonants														
independent	dependent	consonants														
ᝀ a		ᝃ ka	ᝄ ga	ᝅ nga	ᝆ ta	ᝇ da	ᝈ na	ᝉ pa	ᝊ ba	ᝋ ma	ᝌ ya	ᝍ ra	ᝎ la	ᝏ wa	ᝐ sa	ᝑ ha
ᝁ i	◌ᝒ i	ᝃ + ◌ᝒ ᝃᝒ ki	ᝄ + ◌ᝒ ᝄᝒ gi	ᝅ + ◌ᝒ ᝅᝒ ngi	ᝆ + ◌ᝒ ᝆᝒ ti	ᝇ + ◌ᝒ ᝇᝒ di	ᝈ + ◌ᝒ ᝈᝒ ni	ᝉ + ◌ᝒ ᝉᝒ pi	ᝊ + ◌ᝒ ᝊᝒ bi	ᝋ + ◌ᝒ ᝋᝒ mi	ᝌ + ◌ᝒ ᝌᝒ yi	ᝍ + ◌ᝒ ᝍᝒ ri	ᝎ + ◌ᝒ ᝎᝒ li	ᝏ + ◌ᝒ ᝏᝒ wi	ᝐ + ◌ᝒ ᝐᝒ si	ᝑ + ◌ᝒ ᝑᝒ hi
ᝂ u	◌ᝓ u	ᝃ +‌ ◌ᝓ ᝃᝓ ku	ᝄ +‌ ◌ᝓ ᝄᝓ gu	ᝅ +‌ ◌ᝓ ᝅᝓ ngu	ᝆ +‌ ◌ᝓ ᝆᝓ tu	ᝇ +‌ ◌ᝓ ᝇᝓ du	ᝈ +‌ ◌ᝓ ᝈᝓ nu	ᝉ +‌ ◌ᝓ ᝉᝓ pu	ᝊ +‌ ◌ᝓ ᝊᝓ bu	ᝋ +‌ ◌ᝓ ᝋᝓ mu	ᝌ +‌ ◌ᝓ ᝌᝓ yu	ᝍ +‌ ◌ᝓ ᝍᝓ ru	ᝎ +‌ ◌ᝓ ᝎᝓ lu	ᝏ +‌ ◌ᝓ ᝏᝓ wu	ᝐ +‌ ◌ᝓ ᝐᝓ su	ᝑ +‌ ◌ᝓ ᝑᝓ hu

The letter order of the Buhid alphabet Buhid, is based on phonetic principles that consider both the manner and place of articulation of the consonants and vowels they represent.

Buhid writing makes use of single ᜵ and double ᜶ danda punctuation marks.

== Unicode ==
Buhid script was added to the Unicode Standard in March, 2002 with the release of version 3.2.

The Unicode block for Buhid is U+1740–U+175F:

Buhid^{[1]}^{[2]} Official Unicode Consortium code chart (PDF)
	0	1	2	3	4	5	6	7	8	9	A	B	C	D	E	F
U+174x	ᝀ	ᝁ	ᝂ	ᝃ	ᝄ	ᝅ	ᝆ	ᝇ	ᝈ	ᝉ	ᝊ	ᝋ	ᝌ	ᝍ	ᝎ	ᝏ
U+175x	ᝐ	ᝑ	ᝒ	ᝓ												
Notes: 1. As of Unicode version 17.0; 2. Grey areas indicate non-assigned code points

== See also ==
- Kulitan
- Kawi script
- Tagbanwa alphabet
- Filipino orthography
