= Reforms of Kapampangan orthography =

Reforms of Kapampangan orthography in the Latin script began with the adoption toward the end of Spanish colonial rule of an indigenized orthography. Up until then, Spanish norms were used in writing Kapampangan, which in turn meant that Kapampangan orthography was subject to the succession of reforms made by the Real Academia Española to Spanish orthography.

== History ==
From the 10th century AD to 1571, before the Spanish conquest of Lúsung Guo and Kingdom of Tondo which resulted in the creation of the province of Pampanga, Kapampangans used a writing system known as kulitan or súlat Kapampángan. Augustinian missionaries studied the Kapampangan language and its writing system.

As late as 1699, more than a century after the Spanish conquest, Spaniards continued studying the Kapampangan language and writing system. The Spanish introduced a Romanized orthography, known as the Bácolor orthography (súlat Bakúlud). Because of the number of works written in this orthography, which uses the letters q, c, f, ñ and ll, its users dub it tutûng Kapampángan—"genuine Pampangan".

By the end of Spanish colonial rule, the abakada, which was an "indigenized" orthography based on José Rizal's use of ⟨k⟩ for ⟨c⟩ and ⟨qu⟩ but which went further by eliminating ⟨ch⟩, ⟨ll⟩ and ⟨ñ⟩ and modifying general spelling rules, gained favor among Philippine nationalist writers among the Pampangans, two of them being Arturo Tolentino and Mónico Mercado. As many of these writers, including Tolentino and Mercado, were from Guagua, the abakada came to be known among Pampangans as súlat Wáwâ, "Guagua writing". Another Pampangan and member of the Institute of National Language (INL), Zoilo Hilario, would later support the imposition of súlat Wáwâ, with the addition of the Tagalog ⟨w⟩, on the Pampangan language. This action unwittingly introduced into the Pampangan literary scene the bitter orthographic conflict which had by then begun to take root at the national level between writers supportive of one spelling system and the other.

In 1970 (before his translation of the Bible into Kapampangan), Venancio Samson called the dispute over Kapampangan orthography to the attention of the Philippine Bible Society and submitted a proposal aimed at reconciling the old and the new spelling in Kapampangan writing with what is known as Ámung Samson's Hybrid Orthography. Samson's synthesis was readily accepted by the Catholic Archdiocese of Pampanga, which used it in most of its Kapampangan publications during the early 1970s.

In 1997, the organization Batiáuan ("sentry") said that the major obstacle to popularizing Kapampangan was the intense conflict over orthography. The prediction that the Kapampangans would be absorbed by the Tagalogs, at least linguistically, was seen by Kapampangan groups as a real threat, since Tagalog words were replacing indigenous words in spoken Kapampangan. They revised the abakada in Kapampangan writing, removing the ⟨w⟩ which was similarly absent in Spanish, and the acento grave. According to the Pampangan Academy (Akademiang Kapampángan), the Batiáuan revision complicates Kapampangan writing and confuses adherents of their proposed orthography. Batiáuan insists that the diacritical marks are essential in written Kapampangan, because many words are spelled the same but are pronounced differently. From this perspective, diacritical marks facilitate understanding instead of complicating the language. The ⟨w⟩ has since been reintroduced to the Batiáwan orthography, which is today regulated by the Sínúpan Singsing and promoted by Pampangan-cultural societies and vlogs.

In 2016, the Filipino-based orthography became the official orthography of the Kapampangan language. In 2018, in its Statement on the Harmonization of Orthographies, the Komisyon sa Wikang Filipino announced its goal of "harmonizing" the spelling systems of all the indigenous languages in the Philippines, on the basis that all "belong[ed] to one family of languages" and on the grounds that the previous orthographies were, as it claims, "inefficient" and of "Spanish" origin. Proponents of the adoption of kúlitan cite the endless orthographic disputes over the Latin script as a reason to shift to the modernized precolonial Brahmic script.

== See also ==
- Kulitan
