= Hanunoo (Unicode block) =

- Range: U+1720..U+173F (32 code points)
- Plane: BMP
- Scripts: Hanunoo (21 char.); Common (2 char.)
- Major alphabets: Hanunó'o
- Assigned: 23 code points
- Unused: 9 reserved code points

Unicode version history
- 3.2 (2002): 23 (+23)

Unicode documentation
- Code chart ∣ Web page

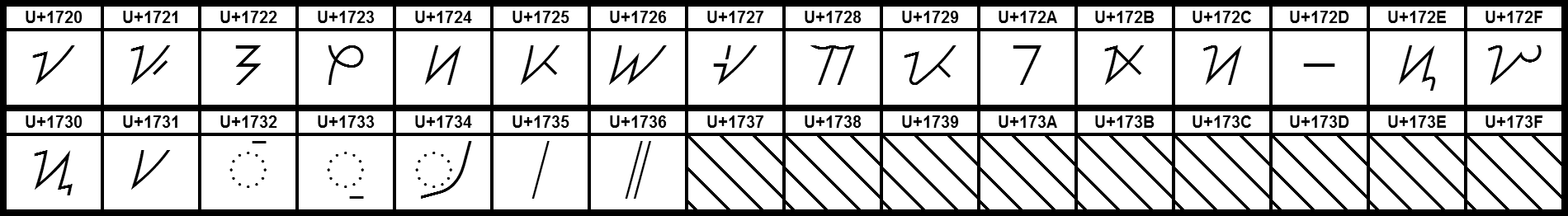
Graphical representation of the Hanunoo Unicode block

Hanunoo is a Unicode block containing characters used for writing the Hanunó'o language. It also contains the two punctuation marks (᜵ and ᜶) which are unified characters for all the Philippine scripts (Baybayin, Hanunoo, Buhid and Tagbanwa).

Hanunoo^{[1]}^{[2]} Official Unicode Consortium code chart (PDF)
	0	1	2	3	4	5	6	7	8	9	A	B	C	D	E	F
U+172x	ᜠ	ᜡ	ᜢ	ᜣ	ᜤ	ᜥ	ᜦ	ᜧ	ᜨ	ᜩ	ᜪ	ᜫ	ᜬ	ᜭ	ᜮ	ᜯ
U+173x	ᜰ	ᜱ	ᜲ	ᜳ	᜴	᜵	᜶									
Notes: 1. As of Unicode version 17.0; 2. Grey areas indicate non-assigned code points

== History ==
The following Unicode-related documents record the purpose and process of defining specific characters in the Hanunoo block:

Version	Final code points (Note: Proposed code points and characters names may differ from final code points and names)	Count	L2 ID	WG2 ID	Document
3.2	U+1720..1736	23	L2/98-217	N1755 (pdf, Attach)	Everson, Michael (1998-05-25), Proposal for encoding the Philippine scripts in the BMP of ISO/IEC 10646
3.2	U+1720..1736	23	L2/98-397		Everson, Michael (1998-11-23), Revised proposal for encoding the Philippine scripts in the UCS
3.2	U+1720..1736	23	L2/99-014	N1933	Everson, Michael (1998-11-23), Revised proposal for encoding the Philippine scripts in the UCS
3.2	U+1720..1736	23	L2/98-419 (pdf, doc)		Aliprand, Joan (1999-02-05), "Philippine Scripts", Approved Minutes -- UTC #78 & NCITS Subgroup L2 # 175 Joint Meeting, San Jose, CA -- December 1-4, 1998, "[#78-M8] Motion:To accept document L2/98-397, Revised proposal for encoding Philippine scripts, for addition to the Unicode Standard after Version 3.0."
3.2	U+1720..1736	23	L2/99-232	N2003	Umamaheswaran, V. S. (1999-08-03), "9.4.1", Minutes of WG 2 meeting 36, Fukuoka, Japan, 1999-03-09--15
3.2	U+1720..1736	23	L2/00-097	N2194	Sato, T. K. (2000-02-22), Philippino characters (status report)
3.2	U+1720..1736	23	L2/00-357		Everson, Michael (2000-10-16), Philippine Scripts (draft block description)
3.2	U+1720..1736	23	L2/01-050	N2253	Umamaheswaran, V. S. (2001-01-21), "7.14 Philippine scripts", Minutes of the SC2/WG2 meeting in Athens, September 2000
3.2	U+1720..1736	23	L2/21-117		Pournader, Roozbeh (2021-05-20), Pamudpod properties (Tagalog and Hanunoo) [Affects U+1734]
3.2	U+1720..1736	23	L2/21-130		Anderson, Deborah; Whistler, Ken; Pournader, Roozbeh; Liang, Hai (2021-07-26), "18 Tagalog and Hanunoo [Affects U+1734]", Recommendations to UTC #168 July 2021 on Script Proposals
3.2	U+1720..1736	23	L2/21-123		Cummings, Craig (2021-08-03), "Consensus 168-C29 [Affects U+1734]", Draft Minutes of UTC Meeting 168
