= Hanunoo script =

Abugida indigenous to Mindoro, Philippines

Hanunó'o (Mangyan Baybayin/Surat Mangyan) ᜱᜨᜳᜨᜳᜢ
- Script type: Abugida
- Period: c. 1300–present
- Direction: Left-to-right, bottom-to-top
- Languages: Hanunó'o, Tagalog

Related scripts
- Parent systems: Egyptian hieroglyphs: Proto-Sinaitic; Phoenician; Aramaic; Brahmi; Tamil-Brahmi; Pallava; Kawi; Baybayin; Hanunó'o (Mangyan Baybayin/Surat Mangyan)
- Sister systems: In the Philippines: Buhid (Mangyan Baybayin, Surat Mangyan); Kulitan (Súlat Kapampángan); Tagbanwa script Ibalnan script In the Indonesian Archipelago: Balinese; Batak; Javanese; Lontara; Sundanese; Rencong Rejang

ISO 15924
- ISO 15924: Hano (371), Hanunoo (Hanunóo)

Unicode
- Unicode alias: Hanunoo
- Unicode range: U+1720–U+173F

Hanunoo (IPA: [hanunuʔɔ]), also rendered Hanunó'o, is one of the scripts indigenous to the Philippines and is used by the Mangyan peoples of southern Mindoro to write the Hanunó'o language.

It is an abugida descended from the Brahmic scripts, closely related to Sulat Tagalog, and is famous for being written vertical but written upward, rather than downward as nearly all other scripts (however, it is read horizontally left to right). It is usually written on bamboo by incising characters with a knife. Most known Hanunó'o inscriptions are relatively recent because of the perishable nature of bamboo. It is therefore difficult to trace the history of the script.

== Structure ==
Fifteen basic characters of the Hanunó'o script each represent one of the fifteen consonants /p/ /t/ /k/ /b/ /d/ /ɡ/ /m/ /n/ /ŋ/ /l/ /r/ /s/ /h/ /j/ /w/ followed by the inherent vowel /a/. Other syllables are written by modifying each of these characters with one of two diacritics (kudlit) which change the vowel sound to /i/ or /u/. The glyph for /la/ is the same as that for /ra/ but /li/ and /ri/ are distinct, as are /lu/ and /ru/. There are three independent vowels (phonetically preceded by a glottal stop, transliterated as q). Final consonants are not written, and so must be determined from context. Dutch anthropologist Antoon Postma, who went to the Philippines from the Netherlands in the 1950s, introduced the pamudpod virama (᜴) to indicate a syllable final consonant. The pamudpod is also used in modern Baybayin.

Vowels and diacritics
ᜠ a	ᜡ i	ᜢ u	
	ᜲ -i	ᜳ -u	᜴ - pamudpod

Hanunó'o syllables and final consonants
ᜣ ka	ᜤ ga	ᜥ nga	ᜦ ta	ᜧ da	ᜨ na	ᜩ pa	ᜪ ba	ᜫ ma	ᜬ ya	ᜭ ra	ᜮ la	ᜯ wa	ᜰ sa	ᜱ ha
ᜣ + ᜲ ᜣᜲ ki	ᜤ + ᜲ ᜤᜲ gi	ᜥ + ᜲ ᜥᜲ ngi	ᜦ + ᜲ ᜦᜲ ti	ᜧ + ᜲ ᜧᜲ di	ᜨ + ᜲ ᜨᜲ ni	ᜩ + ᜲ ᜩᜲ pi	ᜪ + ᜲ ᜪᜲ bi	ᜫ + ᜲ ᜫᜲ mi	ᜬ + ᜲ ᜬᜲ yi	ᜭ + ᜲ ᜭᜲ ri	ᜮ + ᜲ ᜮᜲ li	ᜯ + ᜲ ᜯᜲ wi	ᜰ + ᜲ ᜰᜲ si	ᜱ + ᜲ ᜱᜲ hi
ᜣ + ᜳ ᜣᜳ ku	ᜤ + ᜳ ᜤᜳ gu	ᜥ + ᜳ ᜥᜳ ngu	ᜦ + ᜳ ᜦᜳ tu	ᜧ + ᜳ ᜧᜳ du	ᜨ + ᜳ ᜨᜳ nu	ᜩ + ᜳ ᜩᜳ pu	ᜪ + ᜳ ᜪᜳ bu	ᜫ + ᜳ ᜫᜳ mu	ᜬ + ᜳ ᜬᜳ yu	ᜭ + ᜳ ᜭᜳ ru	ᜮ + ᜳ ᜮᜳ lu	ᜯ + ᜳ ᜯᜳ wu	ᜰ + ᜳ ᜰᜳ su	ᜱ + ᜳ ᜱᜳ hu
ᜣ + ᜴ ᜣ᜴ -k	ᜤ + ᜴ ᜤ᜴ -g	ᜥ + ᜴ ᜥ᜴ -ng	ᜦ + ᜴ ᜦ᜴ -t	ᜧ + ᜴ ᜧ᜴ -d	ᜨ + ᜴ ᜨ᜴ -n	ᜩ + ᜴ ᜩ᜴ -p	ᜪ + ᜴ ᜪ᜴ -b	ᜫ + ᜴ ᜫ᜴ -m	ᜬ + ᜴ ᜬ᜴ -y	ᜭ + ᜴ ᜭ᜴ -r	ᜮ + ᜴ ᜮ᜴ -l	ᜯ + ᜴ ᜯ᜴ -w	ᜰ + ᜴ ᜰ᜴ -s	ᜱ + ᜴ ᜱ᜴ -h

The script makes use of single ( ᜵ ) and double ( ᜶ ) danda punctuation characters.

== Direction of writing ==
Hanunó'o alternative letters ra and wu

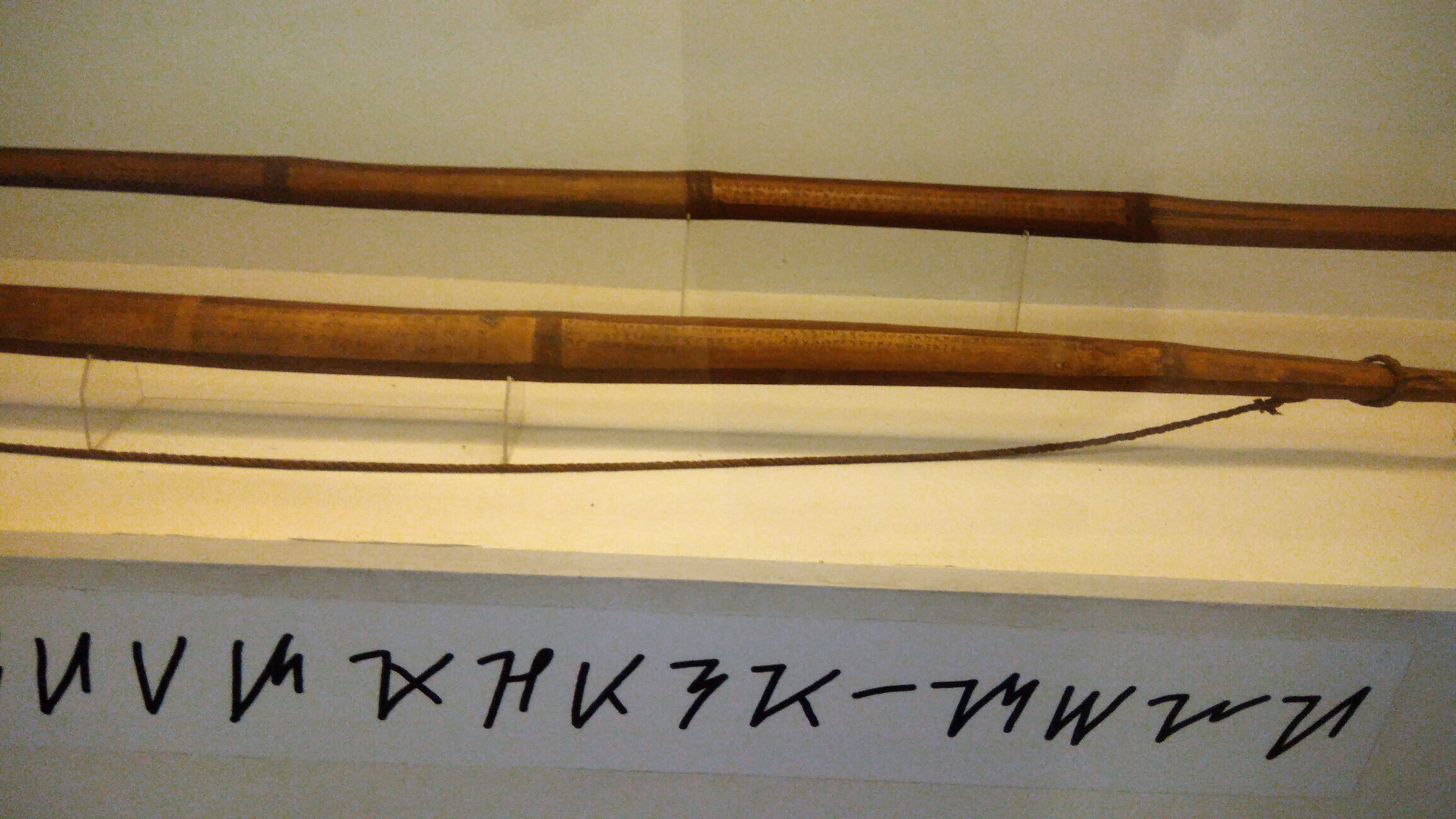
A bamboo bow (bayi, ᜪᜬᜲ) from Oriental Mindoro, inscribed with Hanunó'o

The Hanunó'o script is conventionally written away from the body (from bottom to top) in columns which go from left to right. Within the columns, characters may have any orientation but the orientation must be consistent for all characters in a text. The characters are typically vertical with the /i/ diacritic on the left and the /u/ on the right, or horizontal with the /i/ on the top and the /u/ on the bottom. Left-handed people often write in mirror image, which reverses both the direction of writing (right to left instead of left to right) and the characters themselves.

== Learning the script ==
Young Hanunó'o men and women (called layqaw) learn the script primarily in order to memorize love songs. The goal is to learn as many songs as possible, and using the script to write the songs facilitates this process. The script is also used to write letters, notifications, and other documents. The characters are not memorized in any particular order; learners typically begin by learning how to write their name. Literacy among the Hanunó'o people is high despite a lack of formal education in the script.

== Examples ==
The Hanunó'o people's poetry, Ambahan, consists of seven syllable lines inscribed onto bamboo segments, nodes, musical instruments or other materials using the tip of a knife. Charcoal and other black pigments are then used to make the characters stand out. The poems represent a Mangyan's personal thoughts, feelings or desires. It is recited during social occasions (without accompaniment), in courting ceremonies or when requested.

Hanunoo text

ᜰᜲ ᜠᜩᜳ ᜪ ᜢ ᜩ ᜧ
ᜨᜳ ᜣ ᜦᜲ ᜨ ᜤᜲ ᜧ ᜫ
ᜫ ᜢ ᜮ ᜫ ᜧᜲ ᜣ ᜨ
ᜫ ᜦ ᜣᜲ ᜫ ᜧᜲ ᜣ ᜯ
ᜨᜳ ᜣ ᜦᜲ ᜨ ᜤᜲ ᜧᜳ ᜫ
ᜤ ᜰᜲ ᜬᜳ ᜧᜲ ᜰ ᜠ ᜥ
ᜤ ᜩ ᜦ ᜧ ᜬᜳ ᜧ ᜫ ᜶

Hanunoo text with pamudpod

ᜰᜲ ᜠᜬ᜴ᜩᜳᜧ᜴ ᜪᜬ᜴ ᜢ ᜥ ᜧᜨ᜴
ᜨᜳ ᜣᜥ᜴ ᜦᜲ ᜨ ᜤᜲᜨ᜴ᜧᜳ ᜫᜨ᜴
ᜫᜬ᜴ ᜦ ᜣᜲᜩ᜴ ᜫ ᜧᜲ ᜣᜬ᜴ ᜯᜨ᜴
ᜫᜳ ᜣᜥ᜴ ᜦᜲ ᜨ ᜤᜲᜨ᜴ ᜧᜳ ᜫᜨ᜴
ᜤ ᜰᜲ ᜬᜳᜨ᜴ ᜧᜲ ᜰ ᜠᜧ᜴ ᜥᜨ᜴
ᜤ ᜩᜤ᜴ ᜦᜥ᜴ᜧ ᜬᜳᜨ᜴ ᜧᜲ ᜫᜨ᜴᜶

Transliteration

Si ay-pod bay u- pa- dan
No kang ti- na gin-du- man
May u- lang ma- di kag-nan
May ta- kip ma di kay-wan
Mo kang ti- na gin-du- man
Ga si- yon di sa ad- ngan
Ga pag- tang-da- yon di-man.

English

You my friend, dearest of all,
thinking of you makes me sad;
rivers deep are in between
forests vast keep us apart
But thinking of you with love;
as if you are here nearby
standing, sitting at my side.

== Unicode ==
The Unicode range for Hanunó'o is U+1720–U+173F:

Hanunoo^{[1]}^{[2]} Official Unicode Consortium code chart (PDF)
	0	1	2	3	4	5	6	7	8	9	A	B	C	D	E	F
U+172x	ᜠ	ᜡ	ᜢ	ᜣ	ᜤ	ᜥ	ᜦ	ᜧ	ᜨ	ᜩ	ᜪ	ᜫ	ᜬ	ᜭ	ᜮ	ᜯ
U+173x	ᜰ	ᜱ	ᜲ	ᜳ	᜴	᜵	᜶									
Notes 1.As of Unicode version 18.0 2.Grey areas indicate non-assigned code points

== See also ==
- Baybayin
- Buhid script
- Tagbanwa alphabet
- Kawi script
- Filipino orthography
- Kulitan
- See multilingual support for fonts supporting Hanunó'o
