= Kulitan =

Brahmic script

- Modern Kulitan script
- Script type: Abugida
- Period: 1900s – present
- Direction: Right-to-left script, vertical writing
- Languages: Kapampangan

Related scripts
- Parent systems: Proto-Sinaitic alphabet: Phoenician alphabet; Aramaic alphabet; Brāhmī; Tamil; Pallava; Old Kawi; Baybayin; Kulitan
- Sister systems: In the Philippines: Baybayin; Buhid; Hanunó'o; Tagbanwa script In other countries: Balinese; Batak; Javanese; Lontara; Sundanese; Rencong; Rejang

Kulitan is a reconstructed writing system in the Philippines based on baybayin, referred to as culit in the Kapampangan language of Central Luzon. Culit was used to write the language until it was gradually replaced by the Latin alphabet.

Kulitan is an abugida, or an alphasyllabary — a segmental writing system in which consonant–vowel sequences are written as a unit and possess an inherent vowel sound that can be altered with use of diacritical marks. There is a proposal to encode the script in Unicode by Anshuman Pandey, from the Department of Linguistics at UC Berkeley. There are also proposals to revive the script by teaching it in Kapampangan-majority public and private schools.

== History ==
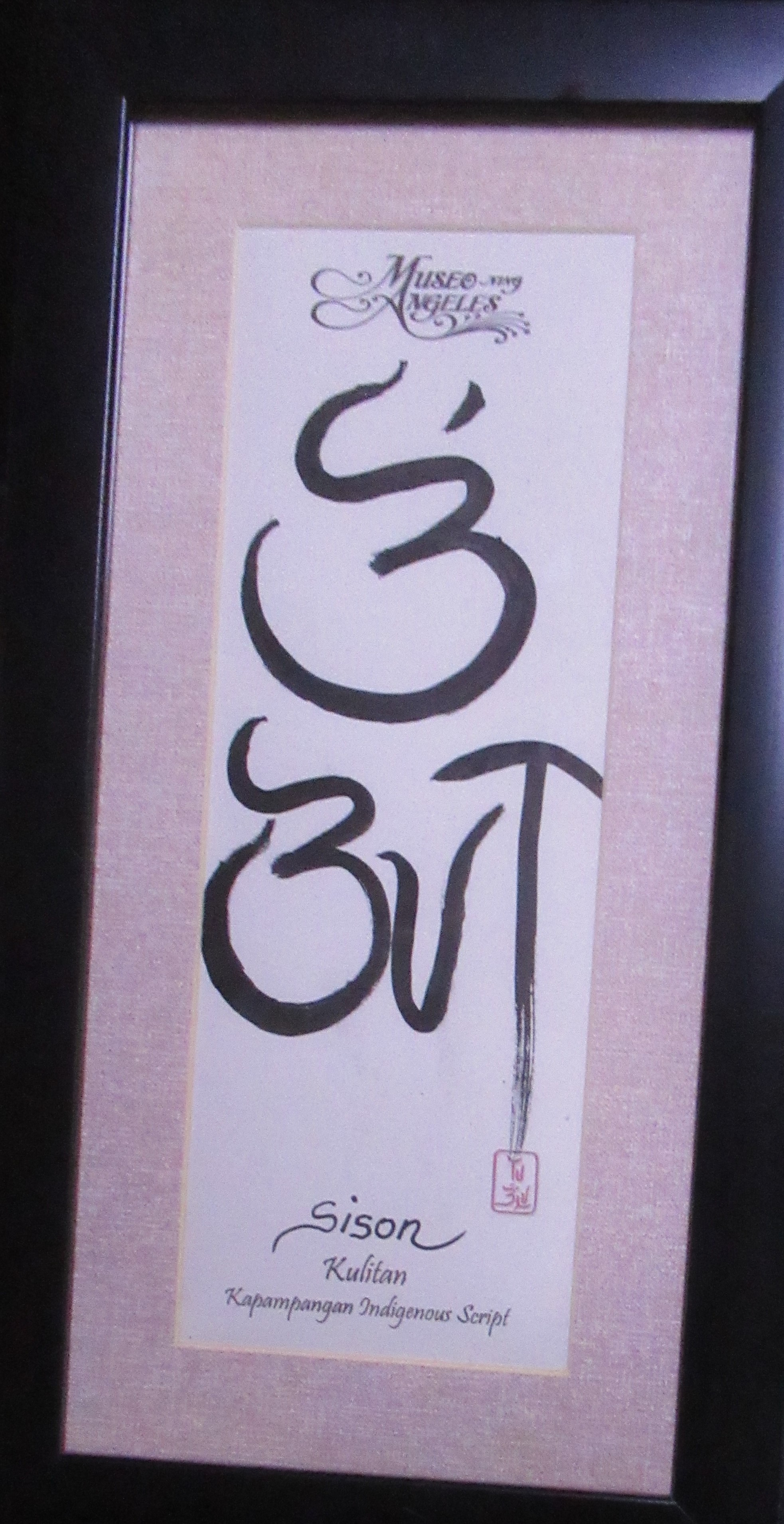
Kulitan calligraphy example from Angeles City Library

While the precise origins of kulitan are uncertain, it ultimately derives from the South Asian Brāhmī script. Pampanga had already developed special shapes for four letters by the early 1600s, different from the ones used elsewhere in the Spanish colony. What is used today, however, is a modernized version of the ancient script that employs consonant stacking, bringing it closer to other Brahmic scripts such as Burmese, Khmer and Tibetan.

Philippine nationalists of Pampangan ethnicity, such as Aurelio Tolentino and Zoilo Hilario, had employed kulitan in their writings in their efforts to expel the Spaniards and repel the invading Americans. There are currently active attempts to revive the use of the script.

== Structure ==
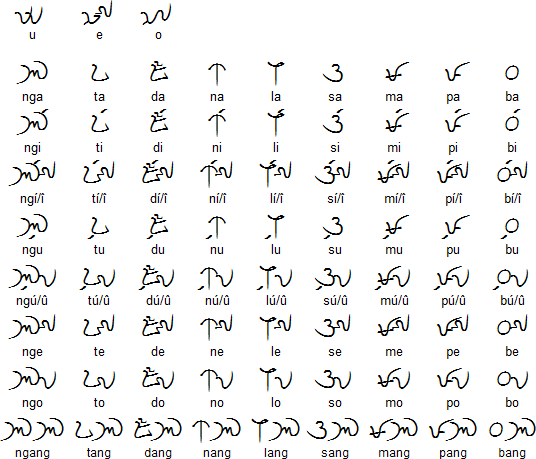
Partial Kulitan chart

The indigenous characters were recorded as culit by the early 17th and 18th century Spanish lexicographers (Benavente, 1699 and Bergaño, 1732). This served as inspiration for the name "Kulitan" which was recently coined to refer to the modern writing system. The ordinary folks simply called them Súlat Kapampángan to distinguish them from the Latin script.

Kulitan is made up of Indûng Súlat, or the "progenitor" (literally "mother") characters, and the Anak Súlat, or the "offspring" (literally "child") characters. The Indûng Súlat are the base characters with the unaltered inherent vowel sounds. They are the building blocks of Súlat Kapampángan. Indûng súlat gives birth to Anak Súlat or "offspring" characters whenever their inherent vowel sound has been altered by a ligature or a diacritical mark.

The siuálâ or vowels in Kulitan are usually written as garlit or diacritical marks placed above or below an individual Indûng Súlat or "mother" character. Ligatures are also sometimes used to further lengthen these vowel sounds or represent the monophthongized diphthongs AI (E) and AU (O). A glyph with a diacritical mark or ligature attached to it is an Anak Súlat or "offspring" character. A consonant can lose its following vowel if written at the right side of the preceding consonant.

The recital order of the Indûng Súlat characters are A, I, U, E, O, GA, KA, NGA, TA, DA, NA, LA, SA, MA, PA, BA.

== Direction of writing ==
Historic:, Traditional:, Modern:

Kulitan is currently the only indigenous script in the Philippines that is written and read vertically from top to bottom and from right to left. In contrast, the Surat Mangyan, Hanunóo and Buhid scripts are written vertically from bottom to top and from left to right but read in any orientation.

Handwritten samples and signatures found in 17th century land deeds at the University of Santo Tomas Archives indicate that Kulitan was rarely written vertically.

== See also ==
- Suyat
- Abugida
- Baybayin
- Basahan
- Buhid script
- Hanunó'o script
- Tagbanwa alphabet
- Filipino orthography
- Kawi script
