= Buhid (Unicode block) =

- Range: U+1740..U+175F (32 code points)
- Plane: BMP
- Scripts: Buhid
- Major alphabets: Buhid
- Assigned: 20 code points
- Unused: 12 reserved code points

Unicode Version History
- 3.2 (2002): 20 (+20)

Unicode documentation
- Code chart ∣ Web page

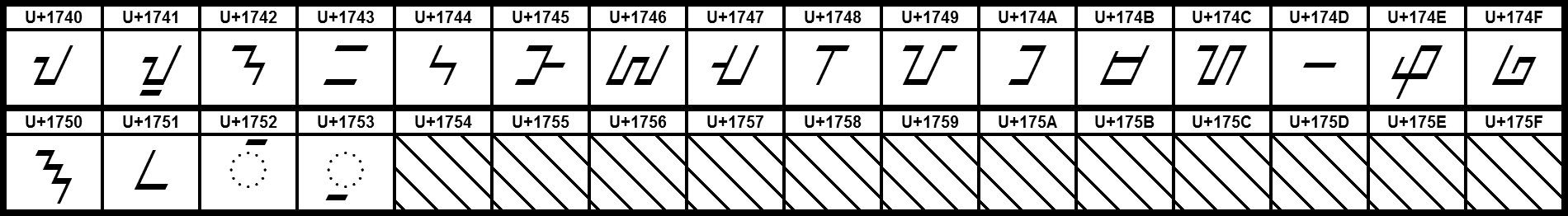
Graphical representation of the Buhid Unicode block. Hatched boxes indicate non-assigned code points.

Buhid is a Unicode block containing characters for writing the Buhid language of the Philippines.

Buhid^{[1]}^{[2]} Official Unicode Consortium code chart (PDF)
	0	1	2	3	4	5	6	7	8	9	A	B	C	D	E	F
U+174x	ᝀ	ᝁ	ᝂ	ᝃ	ᝄ	ᝅ	ᝆ	ᝇ	ᝈ	ᝉ	ᝊ	ᝋ	ᝌ	ᝍ	ᝎ	ᝏ
U+175x	ᝐ	ᝑ	ᝒ	ᝓ												
Notes 1.As of Unicode version 17.0 2.Grey areas indicate non-assigned code points

== History ==
The following Unicode-related documents record the purpose and process of defining specific characters in the Buhid block:

Version	Final code points (Note: Proposed code points and characters names may differ from final code points and names)	Count	L2 ID	WG2 ID	Document
3.2	U+1740..1753	20	L2/98-217	N1755 (pdf, Attach)	Everson, Michael (1998-05-25), Proposal for encoding the Philippine scripts in the BMP of ISO/IEC 10646
3.2	U+1740..1753	20	L2/98-397		Everson, Michael (1998-11-23), Revised proposal for encoding the Philippine scripts in the UCS
3.2	U+1740..1753	20	L2/99-014	N1933	Everson, Michael (1998-11-23), Revised proposal for encoding the Philippine scripts in the UCS
3.2	U+1740..1753	20	L2/98-419 (pdf, doc)		Aliprand, Joan (1999-02-05), "Philippine Scripts", Approved Minutes -- UTC #78 & NCITS Subgroup L2 # 175 Joint Meeting, San Jose, CA -- December 1-4, 1998, "[#78-M8] Motion:To accept document L2/98-397, Revised proposal for encoding Philippine scripts, for addition to the Unicode Standard after Version 3.0."
3.2	U+1740..1753	20	L2/99-232	N2003	Umamaheswaran, V. S. (1999-08-03), "9.4.1", Minutes of WG 2 meeting 36, Fukuoka, Japan, 1999-03-09--15
3.2	U+1740..1753	20	L2/00-097	N2194	Sato, T. K. (2000-02-22), Philippino characters (status report)
3.2	U+1740..1753	20	L2/00-357		Everson, Michael (2000-10-16), Philippine Scripts (draft block description)
3.2	U+1740..1753	20	L2/01-050	N2253	Umamaheswaran, V. S. (2001-01-21), "7.14 Philippine scripts", Minutes of the SC2/WG2 meeting in Athens, September 2000
