= Mindoro =

Island in the Philippines

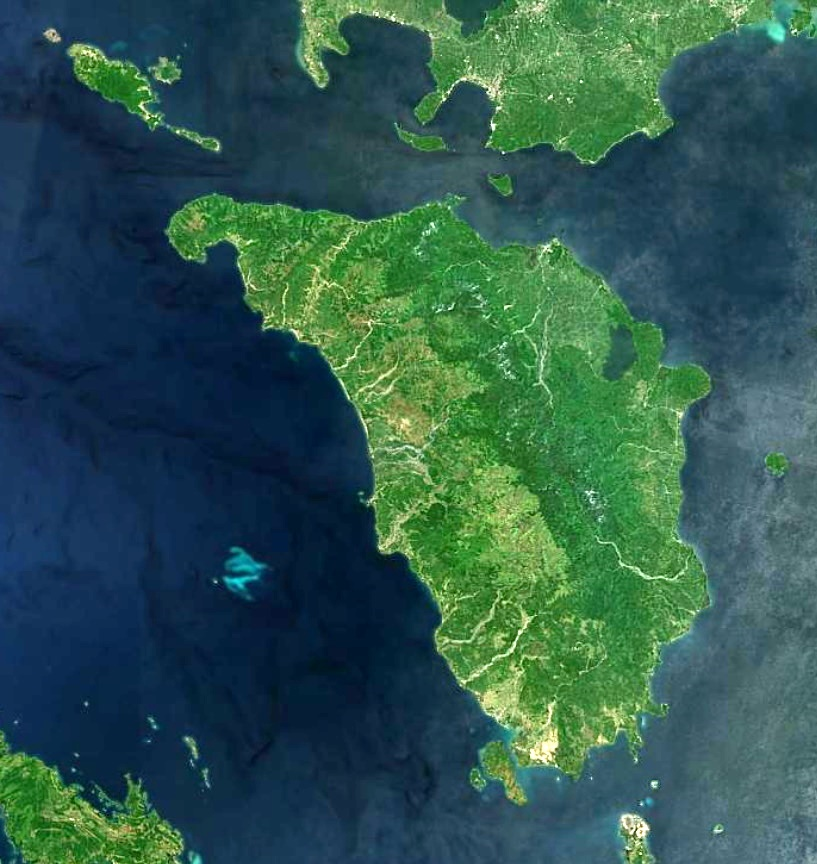
- 2020 satellite image of Mindoro

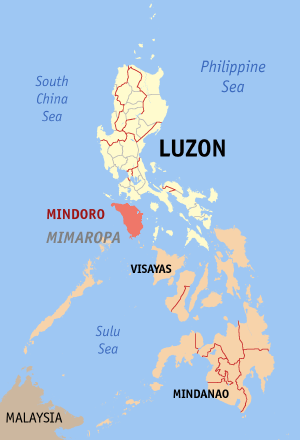
- Location of Mindoro in the Philippines

Geography
- Location: South East Asia
- Coordinates: 12°55′49″N 121°5′40″E
- Archipelago: Philippines
- Adjacent to: Calavite Passage; Mindoro Strait; Sibuyan Sea; South China Sea; Sulu Sea; Tablas Strait; Verde Island Passage
- Area: 10,571.8 km^{2} (4,081.8 sq mi)
- Area rank: 73rd
- Coastline: 618.8 km (384.5 mi)
- Highest elevation: 2,616 m (8583 ft)
- Highest point: Mount Halcon

Administration
- Philippines
- Provinces: Occidental Mindoro; Oriental Mindoro
- Largest settlement: Calapan (pop. 148,558)

Demographics
- Population: 1,430,921 (2024)
- Pop. density: 117.2/km^{2} (303.5/sq mi)
- Ethnic groups: Mangyan; Tagalog; Hiligaynon; Visayan

Mindoro is the seventh largest and eighth-most populous island in the Philippines. With a total land area of 10,571 km^{2} ( 4,082 sq.mi ), it has a population of 1,430,921, as of the 2024 census. It is located off the southwestern coast of Luzon and northeast of Palawan. Mindoro is divided into two provinces: Occidental Mindoro and Oriental Mindoro. Calapan is the only city on the island and largest settlement on the island with a total population of 148,558 inhabitants as of 2024. The southern coast of Mindoro forms the northeastern extremum of the Sulu Sea. Mount Halcon is the highest point on the island, standing at 8,484 feet (2,586 m) above sea level located in Oriental Mindoro. Mount Baco is the island's second highest mountain with an elevation of 8,163 feet (2,488 m), located in the province of Occidental Mindoro.

== Etymology ==
The name Mindoro was likely a corruption of the native name Minolo. Domingo Navarette ('Tratados...', 1676) wrote "The island which the natives call Minolo is named Mindoro by the Spaniards..." (trans. by Blair and Robertson).

== History ==
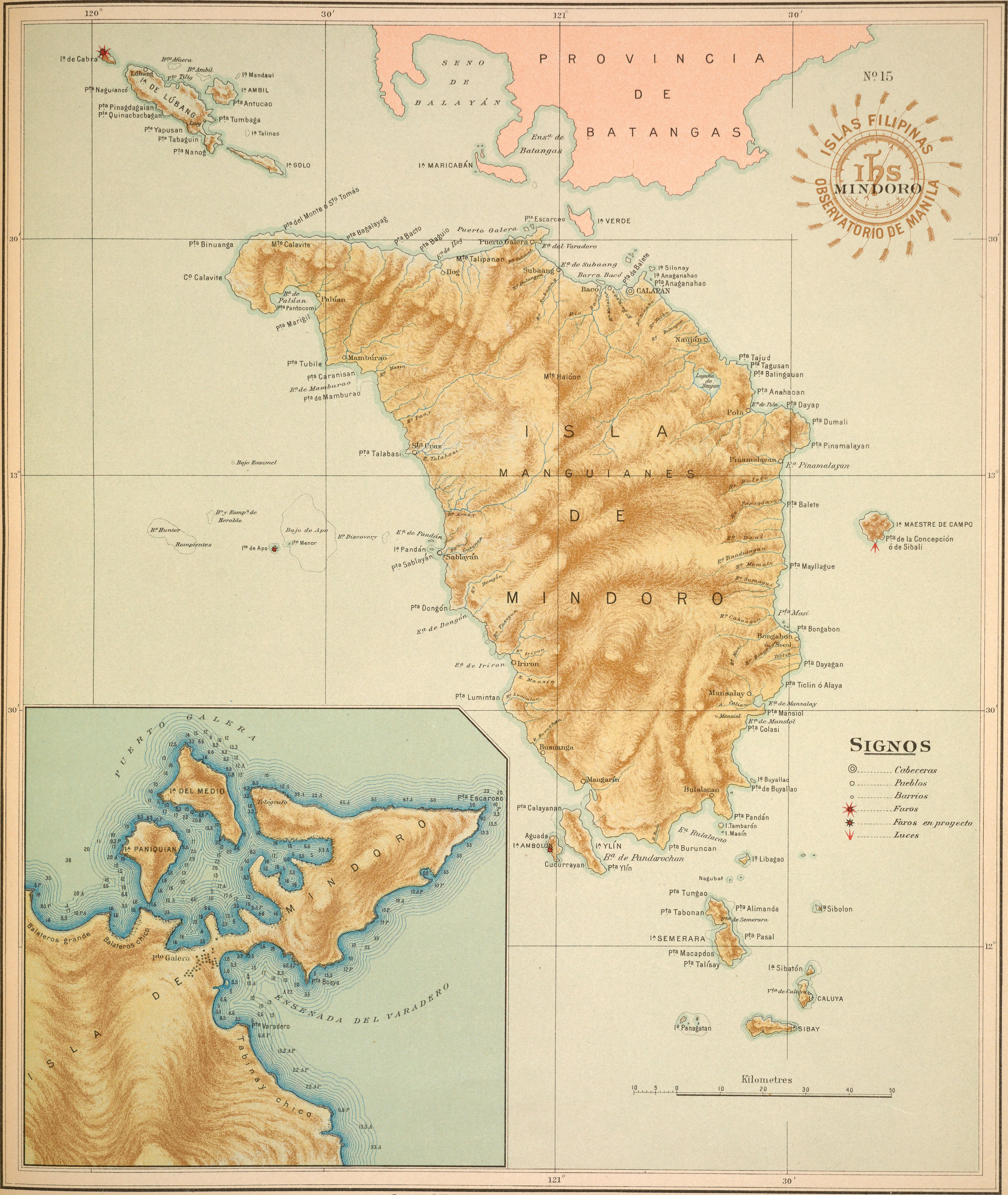
1900 map of Mindoro Island

In precolonial times, the island had been called Ma-i or Mait by Han Chinese traders. Indigenous groups are called Mangyans. The Spaniards called the place Mina de Oro ("gold mine"), from where the island derives the current form of its current name. According to the late historian William Henry Scott, an entry in the official history of the Song Dynasty for the year 972 mentions Ma-i as a state which traded with China. Other Chinese records referring to Ma-i or Mindoro appear in the following years.

The products that Mindoro traders exchanged with the Chinese included “beeswax, cotton, true pearls, tortoiseshell, medicinal betelnuts and yu-ta [jute?] cloth” for Chinese porcelain, trade gold, iron pots, lead, copper, colored glass beads and iron needles.

The island was invaded and conquered by the Sultanate of Brunei and housed Moro settlements before the Spanish invaded and Christianized the population. Afterward, the area was depopulated due to wars between the Spaniards and Moros from Mindanao who sought to enslave the Hispanized people and re-Islamize the island. Two conquistadors from Mexico: Miguel López de Legazpi, held a royal encomienda over coastal trade communities; tributary figures not recorded., he was followed by Felipe de Salcedo who was granted the remainder of Mindoro; and several thousand tributaries estimated. Consequently, most of the population fled to nearby Batangas and the once-rich towns of Mindoro fell into ruin. In the seventeenth century, Giovanni Francesco Gemelli Careri visited the island.

By the end of the 1700s, Mindoro had 3,165 native families and four Spanish Filipino families. In 1818, the number of Spanish-Filipino families greatly increased to 47. With Calapan having 8 Spanish-Filipino families, and Naujan having 6 Spanish-Filipino families. Marinduque which was also ruled from Mindoro had 1 Spanish-Filipino family in Santa Cruz de Napo, Boac had 31 Spanish-Filipino families, while Gazan only had 1.

In 1898, Mindoro joined in the Philippine Revolution against Spain due to the influx of rebels settling into the island from Cavite and Bataan. Local patriotism died down however during the American occupation of the Philippines and the Japanese era.

The island was the location of the Battle of Mindoro in World War II.

Nevertheless, upon Philippine independence from the United States in 1946, the area recovered. From 1920 to 1950, the island was a single province with Calapan as the provincial capital. In 1950, it was partitioned into its present-day provinces, Occidental Mindoro and Oriental Mindoro, following a referendum.

== Geography ==
Mindoro is the seventh (7th) largest island in the Philippines. It is divided into the provinces of Occidental Mindoro and Oriental Mindoro. The Mindoro Mountain Range is the largest and longest mountain range in the island, with a total length of 200 km (120 mi) north-south and 58 km (36 mi) width east–west. Mount Halcon, at 8,484 feet (2,586 meters), is the island’s highest point and is located in Oriental Mindoro.

Mindoro is a center of biodiversity in the Philippines, a megadiverse country, and has a large number of species found nowhere else in the archipelago. Mindoro additionally hosts its own ecoregion, the Mindoro rain forests, separate from neighboring Luzon. Mindoro's biodiversity and isolation is a result of the island not being connected to the rest of the Philippines during the Pleistocene; during this time, most of the Philippine islands were connected to each other during lower sea levels; however, the deeper channels surrounding Mindoro led to it being isolated from the rest of the Philippines during this time.

=== Topography ===
Mindoro Mountain Range List of highest Peaks by elevation.

- Mount Halcon 8,583 ft (2,616 m)
- Mount Baco 8,163 ft (2,488 m)
- Mount Wood 6,640 ft (2,020 m)
- Mount Sinclair 6,135 ft (1,870 m)
- Mount Patrick 5,515 ft (1,681 m)
- Mount Indie 5,472 ft (1,668 m)
- Mount Merril 5,151 ft (1,570 m)
- Mount Calavite 4,990 ft (1,520 m)
- Mount Tallulah 4,882 ft (1,488 m)
- Babuy Peak 4,757 ft (1,450 m)
- Mount Iglit 4,698 ft (1,432 m)
- Mount Roosevelt 4,567 ft (1,392 m)
- Mount Burburungan 4,255 ft (1,297 m)
- Mount Malasimbo 3,957 ft (1,206 m)
- Mount Balatic 3,934 ft (1,199 m)
- Mount Talipanan 3,812 ft (1,162 m)
- Mt. Abra de Ilog 3,533 ft (1,077 m)
- Mount Mearns 3,274 ft (998 m)
- Mount Alinyaban 3,008 ft (917 m)

=== River System ===
List of major river in Mindoro by length.

- Bucayao River 82 km (51 mi)
- Lumintao River 80 km (50 mi)
- Bongabong River 76 km (47 mi)
- Busuanga River 70 km (43 mi)
- Mantangcob River 65.2 km (40.5 mi)
- Balingkawing River 56.7 km (35.2 mi)
- Amnay River 56 km (35 mi)
- Mongpong River 48.2 km (30.0 mi)
- Mag-asawang Tubig 48.2 km (30.0 mi)
- Pagbahan River 48 km (30 mi)
- Arigoy River 48 km (30 mi)
- Lantuyan River 44.5 km (27.7 mi)
- Pandurucan River 43.5 km (27.0 mi)
- Pameyas River 38.8 km (24.1 mi)
- Santa Cruz River 34.2 km (21.3 mi)
- Anahawin River 31.4 km (19.5 mi)
- Abra de Ilog River 27.4 km (17.0 mi)
- Naujan River 19.2 km (11.9 mi)
- Calapan River 15.2 km (9.4 mi)

== Culture ==
=== Languages ===
The principal language in Mindoro is Tagalog, often the Batangas dialect due to its geographical proximity to Batangas and Batangueño residents on the island (the reason for making Mindoro part of Southern Tagalog), with some parts more greatly influenced by the native Mangyan and Visayan languages also spoken on the island. The former is endemic to Mindoro and has dialects, while Ilocano, Bicolano, Hiligaynon, Karay-a, Cuyonon and some foreign languages – e.g., English, Hokkien (the predominant Chinese language of Chinese Filipinos), to a lesser extent, Spanish.

The following indigenous languages (all of them being part of the Philippine branch of the Malayo-Polynesian languages family, as well as Ilocano, Bicolano, and the nationally designated Filipino) are spoken in Mindoro:

- Northern Mindoro languages – 16,000 speakers
  - Iraya – 10,000 speakers
  - Alangan – 2,150 speakers
  - Tadyawan – 4,200 speakers
- Southern Mindoro languages – 30,000 speakers
  - Buhid – 8,000 speakers
  - Tawbuid – 8,000 speakers
  - Hanuno'o – 14,000 speakers
- Visayan languages
  - Ratagnon language – 310 speakers

=== Religion ===
The predominant religion on the island is Christianity. The religion of the indigenous Mangyan population is animism. Though they are into animism as a principal religion, the Catholic Church in some of Mindoro's parts is also active, so are a few independent subdivisions, like Iglesia ni Cristo and Philippine Independent Church, as well as the Baptist Church.

== Economy ==
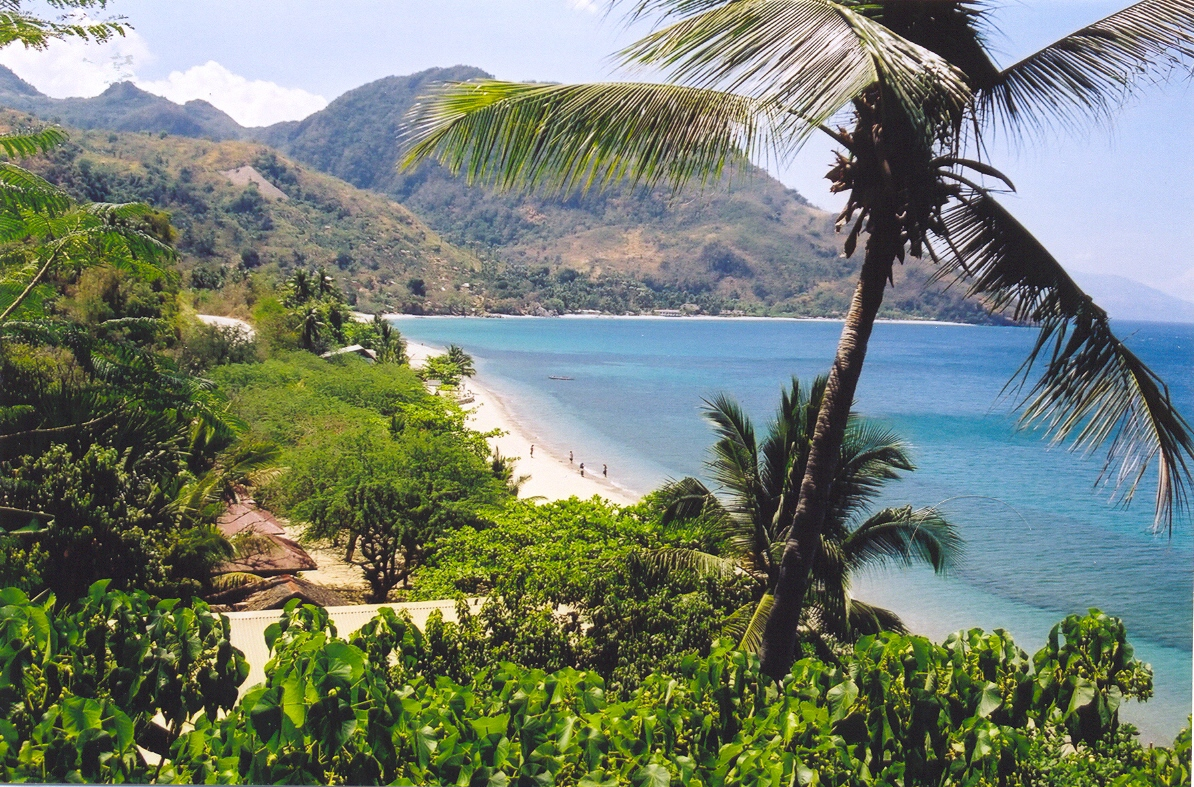
Beach in northern Mindoro

The economy of Mindoro is largely based on agriculture. Products consist of a wide variety of fruits, such as citrus, bananas, lanzones, rambutan and coconuts, grains (rice and corn), sugarcane, peanuts, fish (catfish, milkfish and tilapia), livestock and poultry. Logging and the mining of marble and copper also thrived. Only 5% of the original forest remains as a result of extensive logging, prevalent agricultural practices, and population growth.

Tourism is a lucrative business as well, with locations such as Apo Reef National Park, Lubang Island, Puerto Galera, Sabang Beach and Mount Halcon. Puerto Galera's beaches are the island's most-known tourist attraction and are widely visited.

An important aspect of the economy in Mindoro is mining, mostly by outside companies owned by foreign countries. While foreign countries make most of the money from these mines, the Philippine government still receives some economic and financial benefit from allowing them to mine on their lands. These companies include Pitkin Petroleum, a US-based company which is looking for nickel, oil, and gas in Mindoro, Crew Development Corporation, a Canada-based corporation mining nickel and other precious metals, and Intex, a Norwegian-based company operating the Mindoro Nickel Project. This project is supposed to last 15 years and should produce over 100 million tons of ore by the end of the project. Unfortunately, while the mines might be profitable for the national government, they have caused problems to the environment and the indigenous tribes living in Mindoro.

== Environment ==
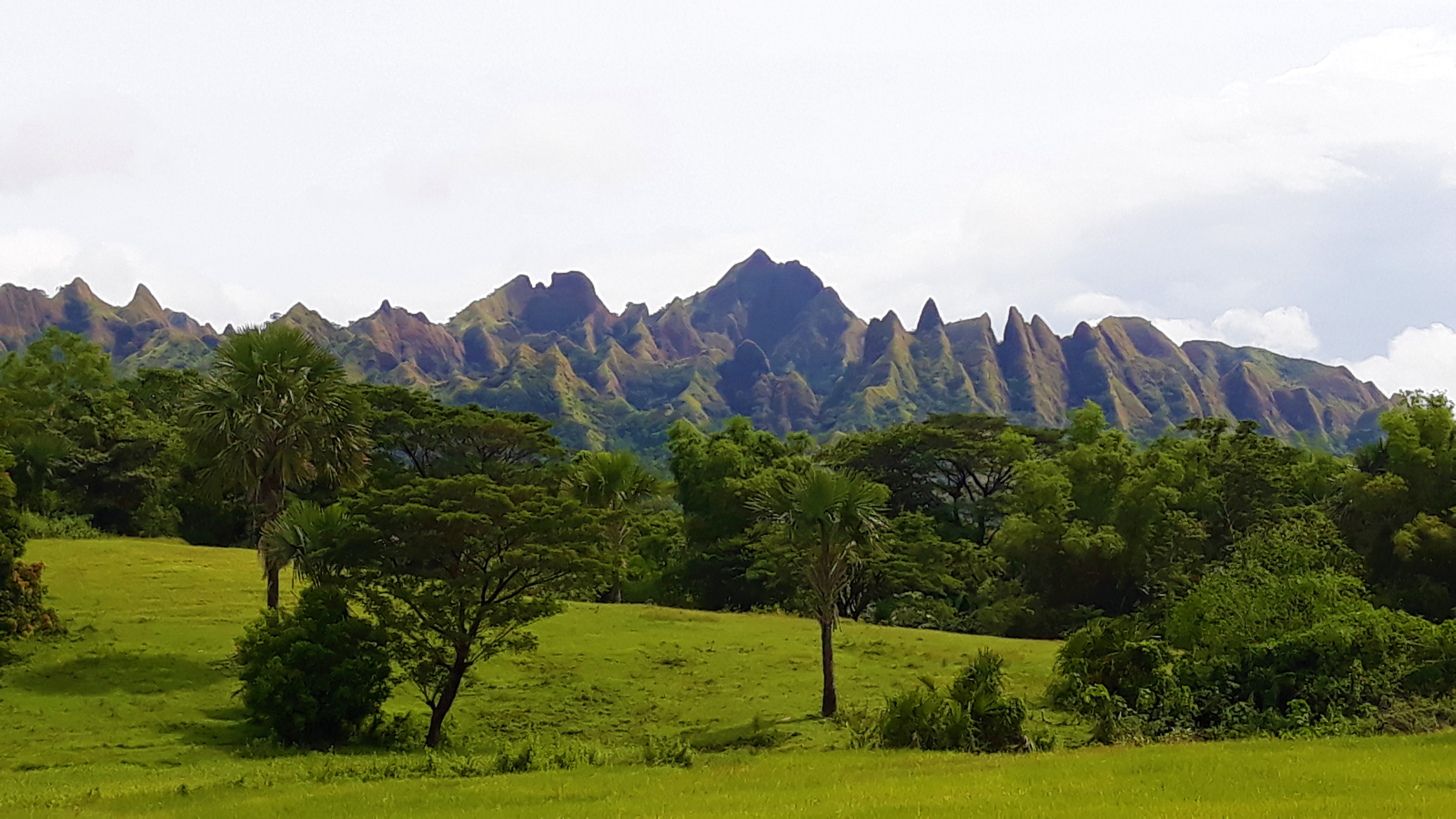
Resource-rich Devil's Mountain

Mining in Mindoro poses a significant risk to the island's environment. Local and international mining interests have disregarded the island's ecology to gain access to the rich tungsten veins that exist below the surface. Intex, a Norwegian Mining Company attempted to begin prospecting for tungsten deposits, but was halted by a regional environmental protection ordinance. Small scale, legal and illegal, environmentally degrading mining operations still persist throughout the island due to a lack of enforcement by the local police.

=== Fauna ===
Mammals

Mindoro dwarf buffalo or Tamaraw Bubalus mindorensis is a species of water buffalo endemic to the island and is an endangered species.

Mindoro Deer (Rusa marianna bandaranus) is a subspecies of the Philippine Deer in the family of Cervidae.

Mindoro warty pig (Sus oliveri) is a species of wild pig in the family of Suidae.

== Bibliography ==
- C.Michael Hogan. 2011. Sulu Sea. Encyclopedia of Earth. Eds. P.Saundry & C.J.Cleveland. Washington DC
