= Southern Mindoro languages =

Austronesian language cluster of the Philippines

South Mangyan
- South Mindoro
- Geographic distribution: Mindoro
- Linguistic classification: Austronesian: Malayo-Polynesian; Philippine; Greater Central Philippine; South Mangyan
- Subdivisions: Buhid; Tawbuid; Hanuno’o

Language codes
- ISO 639-3: –
- Glottolog: sout2915

The Southern Mindoro (South Mangyan) languages are one of two small clusters of Austronesian languages spoken by the Mangyan people of Mindoro Island in the Philippines. They make up a branch of the Greater Central Philippine subgroup.

These are among the few languages of the Philippines which continue to be written in indigenous scripts, though mostly for poetry.

== See also ==
- Northern Mindoro languages
- Ratagnon language
