= Danao languages =

Group of Austronesian languages spoken in the Philippines

Danao
- Geographic distribution: Mindanao, Malaysia (Sabah)
- Ethnicity: Maguindanaon, Maranao and Iranun
- Linguistic classification: Austronesian: Malayo-Polynesian; Philippine; Greater Central Philippine; Danao
- Proto-language: Proto-Danao

Language codes
- Glottolog: dana1253
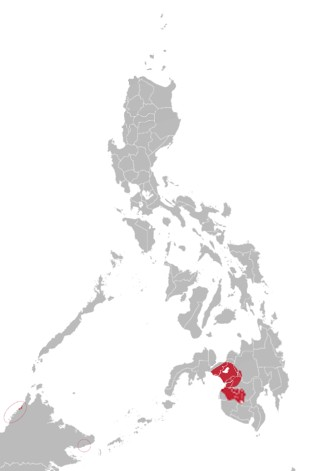
- Geographic extent of Danao languages based on Ethnologue maps

The Danao languages are a group of Austronesian languages spoken in the Philippines. They are the Maguindanaon and Maranao, each with approximately a million speakers; and Iranun with approximately 250,000 speakers.

== Numerals ==
Numerals in Danao languages
Numeral	Maguindanaon	Iranun	Maranao
1	isa	isa	isa
2	dua	duwa	dowa
3	telu	telu	telo
4	pat	pat	pat
5	lima	lima	lima
6	nem	nem	nem
7	pitu	pitu	pito
8	walu	walu	walo
9	siaw	siyaw	siyao
10	sapulu	sapulo	sapolo

== Sample texts ==
=== Universal Declaration of Human Rights ===
Maguindanaon:

Langun nu manusia na pimbata a maradika endu ebpantag-pantag sa maltabat endu hak. Naenggian silan sa akal endu hati endu wagib a enggalbek kanu isa-isa sa lekanilan sa niyawa nu kabpagalia.

Maranao:

Langon a taw na inimbawata a ndudon so kapaar ago ndatadatar sa bantogan ago kabnar. Bigan siran sa kabnar ago gagaw na aya patot a di kapakasusurota o omani isa ko kapakiphapagariya.

Iranun:

Langowan a manosiya na inimbawata na m'r'png r'p'ng ko maratabat ago kabenar. Siran na bigan sa lawod a paro ago g'da g'da ago rakhs nisisita a inggolalan o pithanggisaan so tanto a antap o kaoyag oyag.

English:

All human beings are born free and equal in dignity and rights. They are endowed with reason and conscience and should act towards one another in a spirit of brotherhood.

=== Noun phrases ===
Topic
Maguindanaon	Maranao	English
Pemasa su babay sa seda.	Pephamasa so babay sa seda.	The woman is buying fish.
Pemasa si Rocaya sa seda.	Pephamasa si Rocaya sa seda.	Rocaya is buying fish.
Pemasa sila Tearde sa seda.	Pephamasa siki Tearde sa seda.	Tearde and friends are buying fish.
Pemasa aku sa seda.	Pephamasa ako sa seda.	I am buying fish.
Pemasa ka sa seda.	Pephamasa ka sa seda.	You are buying fish.
Pemasa sekanin sa seda.	Pephamasa sekaniyan sa seda.	He/she is buying fish.
Pemasa ta sa seda.	Pephamasa ta sa seda.	You and I are buying fish.
Pemasa tanu sa seda.	Pephamasa tano sa seda.	We (all of us) are buying fish.
Pemasa kami sa seda.	Pephamasa kami sa seda.	We (excl. you) are buying fish.
Pemasa kanu sa seda.	Pephamasa kano sa seda.	We (incl. you) are buying fish.
Pemasa silan sa seda.	Pephamasa siran sa seda.	They are buying fish.
Pemasa inia sa seda.	Pephamasa aya sa seda.	This guy are buying fish.
Pemasa i nan sa seda.	Pephamasa nan sa seda.	That guy near you is buying fish.
Pemasa intu sa seda.	Pephamasa oto sa seda.	That guy over there is buying fish.

Possessive
Maguindanaon	Maranao	English
Mapulu i alaga nu banggala nu guru.	Mala i arga so bangkala o maistra.	The teacher's clothes are expensive.
Mapulu i alaga nu banggala ni Akmad.	Mala i arga so bangkala i Akmad.	Akmad's clothes are expensive.
Mapulu i alaga nu banggala nila Akmad.	Mala i arga so bangkala i kisi Akmad.	Akmad and co.'s clothes are expensive.
Mapulu i alaga nu banggala ku.	Mala i arga so bangkala aken.	My clothes are expensive.
Mapulu i alaga nu banggala nengka.	Mala i arga so bangkala aka.	Your clothes are expensive.
Mapulu i alaga nu banggala nin.	Mala i arga so bangkala iyan.	His/her clothes are expensive.
Mapulu i alaga nu banggala ta.	Mala i arga so bangkala ta.	Our (you and me) clothes are expensive.
Mapulu i alaga nu banggala tanu.	Mala i arga so bangkala tano.	Our (all of us) clothes are expensive.
Mapulu i alaga nu banggala nami.	Mala i arga so bangkala ami.	Our (excl. you) clothes are expensive.
Mapulu i alaga nu banggala tanu.	Mala i arga so bangkala iyo.	Our (incl. you) clothes are expensive.
Mapulu i alaga nu banggala nilan.	Mala i arga so bangkala iran.	Their clothes are expensive.
Inia a banggala na mapulu i alaga.	Mala i arga a bangkala ini.	This clothing is expensive.
Nan a banggala na mapulu i alaga.	Mala i arga a bangkala a nan.	That (with you) clothing is expensive.
Tu a banggala na mapulu i alaga.	Mala i arga a bangkala oto.	That (over there) clothing is expensive.

Referent
Maguindanaon	Maranao	English
Minangay su penginginseda sa guru.	Somiyong so panginginseda sa maistra.	The fisherman went to the teacher.
Minangay su penginginseda kani Akmad.	Somiyong so panginginseda ki Akmad.	The fisherman went to Akmad.
Minangay su penginginseda kanila Akmad.	Somiyong so panginginseda sa kisi Akmad.	The fisherman went to Akmad and family/friends.
Minangay su penginginseda sa laki.	Somiyong so panginginseda sii raken.	The fisherman went to me.
Minangay su penginginseda sa leka.	Somiyong so panginginseda sa reka.	The fisherman went to you.
Minangay su penginginseda sa lekanin.	Somiyong so panginginseda sa rekaniyan.	The fisherman went to him/her.
Minangay su penginginseda sa lekitanu.	Somiyong so panginginseda sii rektano.	The fisherman went to us.
Minangay su penginginseda sa lekami.	Somiyong so panginginseda sii rekami.	The fisherman went to ours.
Minangay su penginginseda sa lekanu.	Somiyong so panginginseda sa rekiyo.	The fisherman went to yours.
Mnangay su penginginseda sa lekanilan.	Somiyong so panginginseda sa rekiran.	The fisherman went to their house.
Minangay su penginginseda sia.	Somiyong so panginginseda saya.	The fisherman went here.
Minangay su penginginseda san.	Somiyong so panginginseda san.	The fisherman went there (near you).
Minangay su penginginseda lu.	Somiyong so panginginseda roo.	The fisherman went there (far away).

=== Time and space ===
Time
Maguindanaon	Maranao	English
Kanu i kinauma nengka sa Kutawatu?	Anda i kiyapakaoma ngka sa Cotabato?	When did you arrive in Cotabato?
Kanu Isnin.	Isako Isnin.	Last Monday.
Kanu Salasa.	Isako Salasa.	Last Tuesday.
Kanu Arba.	Isako Arbaa.	Last Wednesday.
Kanu Kamis.	Isako Kamis.	Last Thursday.
Kanu Giamat.	Isako Diyamaat.	Last Friday.
Kanu Saptu.	Isako Sapto.	Last Saturday.
Kanu Akad.	Isako Akad.	Last Sunday.
Ngin a kutika i kinangay nengka sa sinian?	Antonaa oras i kiyasong ka sa sine?	What time did you go to the movies?
Manga tenga na kaisa sa malulem.	Manga ala una i midiya .	Around one thirty.
Kanu i kambalingan nengka sa Amerika?	Anda i kambaling ka sa Amerika?	When will you return to America be?
Kanu i kinambalingan nengka sa Amerika ebpun sa Saudi?	Anda i kiyabaling ka sa Amerika poon sa Saudi?	When did you return to Americai from Saudi?

Space
Maguindanaon	Maranao	English
sa pulu na dulang	sa liwawaw a lamisan	on top of the table
sa didalem na dulang	sa dilalem a lamisan	beneath of the table
sa ligid na dulang	sa kilid a lamisan	to the side of the table
sa pulu na dulang	sa poro a lamisan	on the corner of the table
sa biwang na dulang	sa diwang a lamisan	to the left of the table
sa kawanan na dulang	sa kawanan a lamisan	to the right of the table
sa ludep na Masgit	sa soled a Masgit	inside of the Mosque
sa liyu na Masgit	sa liyo a Masgit	outside of the Mosque
sa unan na Masgit	sa una-an a Masgit	just past the Mosque
sa taligkudan na Masgit	sa talikudan a Masgit	behind of the Mosque
sa pantag na Masgit	sa pantag a Masgit	in front of the Mosque

=== Verbs and time ===
Time
Maguindanaon	Maranao	English
Embalingan silan saguna.	Mbaling siran imanto.	They are going home now.
Peginum silan uman gai.	Phaginom siran oman gawii.	They drink every day.
Midtalu silan kagai.	Mitharo siran kagai.	They spoke yesterday.
Pelakaw silan amag.	Pelalakaw siran roo mapita.	They will walk tomorrow.
Minangay silan den lu.	Miyakasong siran roo den.	They have gone there already.
Nailay ku den. su tudtul.	Miyakailay ako den. sa totul.	I was able to see the report.
Nakailay aku sa pilak sa lalan.	Miyakailay ako sa pirak sa lalan.	I happened to see some money on the road.
Makapangagi pan silan.	Makapengadi pen siran.	They can still study.
Edtalu kanu san.	Petero kano pasin.	Please speak, (you guys).

=== Negatives ===
Time
Type	Maguindanaon	Maranao	English
Present / Progressive	Penggalebek ka uman gai?	Penggalebek ka oman gawii?	Do you work every day?
	Di!	Di!	No, I don't!
Past	Midtalu ka kagina?	Mitharo ka kagiya?	Did you speak a while ago?
	Da!	Da!	No, I didn't!
Future	Pedtawag ka amay?	Phatawag ka roo imanto?	Will you call later on?
	Di!	Di!	No, I won't!
Possessions	Aden kaluma nengka?	Aden a karoma ngka?	Do you have a wife?
	Da!	Da!	No, I don't have!
Qualities	Wakil ka?	Abogado ka?	Are you a lawyer?
	Di!	Di!	No, I'm not!

=== Manga, A, Aden, Da ===
Time
Maguindanaon	Maranao	English
Pinamasa ku su manga seda.	Piyamasa aken so manga seda.	I am buying fish.
Mapia a kamal si Akmad.	Mapiya a mayor si Akmad.	Akmad is a good mayor.
Aden guru ku.	Aden a goro aken.	I have a teacher.
Da pilak ku.	Da a kwarta aken.	I don't have money.

=== Object-focus Sentences ===
Time
Tense	Maguindanaon	Maranao	English
Present	Pemasan ku su kitab.	Pemasaan ko so libro.	I am buying book.
Past	Pibpasa ku su walay.	Pipesa ko so walay.	I sold the house.
Present	Pemasan ku su kitab.	Pemasaan aken so libro.	I am buying book.
Past	Pinamasa ku su kamais.	Piyamasa aken so kamays.	I bought the corn.
Future (-en)	Pagyawen ku inia.	Barbikiun giya i.	I will barbecue this.
Future (-en)	Ilingan ku inia.	Kupiyaan giya i.	I will copy this.
Future (i-)	Ipelebeng ku i nan.	Ipelebeng aken anan.	I will say that.
Future (i-)	Enggay ku i nan.	Imbegay aken anan.	I will give that.
Future (-an)	Pedtalabukan ku i nan.	Pembisitaan aken anan.	I will visit that.
Future (-an)	Bayadan ku i nan.	Bayadan aken anan.	I will pay that.
Command (-a)	Pagedai ka inia.	Pageda ngka ini.	Ride this.
Command (-an)	Sigupi ka i nan.	Sigopan angka nan.	Smoke that.
Command (-i)	Ani ka i nan.	Galidi ngka nan.	Harvest that.
