= Iraya language =

Austronesian language spoken in the Philippines

Iraya
- Native to: Philippines
- Region: Mimaropa
- Native speakers: (10,000 cited 1991)
- Language family: Austronesian: Malayo-Polynesian; Philippine; Central Luzon (?); Northern Mindoro; Iraya

Language codes
- ISO 639-3: iry
- Glottolog: iray1237
- ELP: Iraya

The Iraya language is a language spoken by Mangyans on the island of Mindoro in the Philippines. Zorc (1974) places the Iraya language within the North Mangyan group of Malayo-Polynesian languages, though Lobel (2013) notes that it shows "considerable differences" to Tadyawan and Alangan, the other languages in this group. There are 6,000 to 8,000 Iraya speakers, and that number is growing. The language status of Iraya is developing, meaning that this language is being put to use in a strong and healthy manner by its speakers, and it also has its own writing system (though not yet completely common nor maintainable).

Ethnologue reports that Iraya is spoken in the following municipalities of northern Mindoro island.

- Mindoro Occidental Province: Paluan, Abra de Ilog, northern Mamburao, and Santa Cruz municipalities
- Mindoro Oriental Province: Puerto Galera and San Teodoro municipalities

Barbian (1977) also lists the location of Calamintao, on the northeastern boundary of Santa Cruz municipality (7 km (4.3 mi) up the Pagbahan River from the provincial highway).

The language is not well documented, though a translation of the Bible is available locally.

== Dialects and speech registers ==
There are different dialects spoken in the North East, North West, and Southwest areas. Some of these dialects are the following:

1. Abra de Ilog
2. Alag Bako
3. Pagbahan
4. Palauan-Calavite
5. Pambuhan

Basic vocabulary and grammar is shared across the dialects. Besides differences in pronunciation, the dialects differ in their preferred usage of words and expressions from the general Iraya vocabulary stock. Furthermore, there are regional borrowings from adjacent languages. Iraya from the lowland, living between the foothills and the plains, adopted some words from Tagalog. Iraya living in the foothills, or on the lower slopes of Ht. Halcon, adopted words from the closely related Alangan language.

Besides a generally used colloquial register called Ibaba, Iraya knows a quasi-liturgical speech register known as Ita'as. This type of speech is used in power songs used by shamans of Occidental Mindoro. Ita'as is only understood by Shamans, and other people do not recognize this speech. A recording of the power song can be found in the San Teodoro area of Oriental Mindoro.

== Phonemes ==
The Iraya languages distinguishes 20 phonemes:

- 13 consonants: p, b, m, t, d, l, s, r, k, g, ŋ, ‘
- 3 semivowels: w, y, h
- 4 vowels: i, a, e [ɨ], o

The following charts illustrate the phonemes by articulation. The consonant [ŋ] is represented as ⟨ng⟩ in common writing, and the high central vowel [ɨ] is represented by ⟨e⟩. The consonant /s/ can have both a dental or alveolar point of articulation.

Iraya consonants
	Labial	Dental	Palatal	Velar	Glottal
Voiceless stops	p	t		k	ʔ
Voiced stops	b	d		g	
Nasals	m	n		ŋ	
Fricatives		s			
Laterals		l			
Flaps (or Trills)		ɾ ~ r			
Semivowels	w		j		h

Iraya vowels
	Front	Central	Back
High	i	ɨ	
Mid			o
Low		a	

=== Intonation ===
Declarative paragraph: The first sentence starts at a high pitch. Then, each of the next sentences have a lower pitch. The last sentence will have the lowest pitch.

Emotional or dramatic paragraphs: This is the opposite of declarative paragraphs. Each sentence becomes higher than the previous sentence, until the last sentence ends with a more or less higher pitch and long pause.

=== Syllables ===
The following syllable types are used in the Iraya language. (C = consonant; V = vowel)

1. CV (e.g. ka.wu 'you'; ta.wa 'who')
2. CVC (e.g. na.kay 'why; what')
3. CCV (e.g. kwi.tis 'fireworks')
4. CCVC (e.g. pwis.tu 'place; put')

In consonant clusters, the Iraya language only uses /w/ or /r/ as the second consonant in an onset cluster, as in the two examples kwitis and pwistu presented above (the latter being a Spanish loanword).

== Pronouns ==
Nominative (or subjective) and genitive (or possessive) cases are distinguished for pronouns. For example, the pronoun 'I' translated to aku in Iraya, and the pronoun 'my' is na'ay. The Iraya language has dual pronoun forms based on the numeral 'two'. The following table presents the Iraya pronominal paradigm.

Iraya pronouns
		singular		dual	plural
		nominative	genitive	dual	plural
1st person	exclusive	aku	na'ay	kidawa	yamen
1st person	inclusive	aku	na'ay	kita	tamu
2nd person		kawu	kumu	kandawa	kuyu
3rd person		iya	kunin	sidawa	kura

== Demonstratives ==
Zorc (1974) lists the following demonstratives:

Directional
English	Iraya
this	tiya'
that (near)	nabah
that (far)	nata'
here	tuwa'
there (near)	sabah
there (far)	sata'

== Question words ==
Iraya question words
English	Iraya
How much	bidu'
How much	umaning
What	kayu, pakayu
Why	nakay
Where	saru

The two words bidu' and umaning both translate to 'how much, how many' but have different uses. Examples of these question words are given below:

- Bidu' mada dayu' ag gura'an? 'How far (how much distance) is it to town?'
- Umaning aku kuyay kawu? 'How much older am I than you?'

The latter sentence uses umaning because it is counting age.

== Temporal adverbs ==
Time
English	Iraya
A little while ago	aray
Previously	naruwa'an
Now	Nguna
Still	baywi
In the future	duma

== Numerals ==
Numbers
	Cardinal	Ordinal
One/first	sa'i	una
Two/second	darawa, darwa	ikadarawa, ikarawa
Three/third	tatlu	ikatatlu
Four/fourth	apat, upat	ika'apat

== Vocabulary ==
More words
English	Iraya
Both	tanan
No more, not anymore	balen
Few, some	buhida
All, whole	bu'u
More	iben-te
Small, fine	uman
Enough, sufficient	sibay
Each, every	tayma
