= Tadyawan language =

Austronesian language spoken in the Philippines

Tadyawan
- Native to: Philippines
- Region: Oriental Mindoro
- Native speakers: (4,200 cited 2000)
- Language family: Austronesian: Malayo-Polynesian; Philippine; Central Luzón (?); Northern Mindoro; Tadyawan

Language codes
- ISO 639-3: tdy
- Glottolog: tady1237

The Tadyawan language is a language spoken by Mangyans in the southern Lake Naujan in Oriental Mindoro, Philippines.

== Dialects ==
Tweddell (1970:195) lists four dialects.

- Nauhan
- East Aglubang
- West Aglubang
- Pola

Nauhan and East Aglubang are close to each other. The West Aglubang is spoken farthest out and has strong Alangan influence.

Barbian (1977) lists the following locations.

- Barrio Talapaan, Socorro, Oriental Mindoro
- Happy Valley, Socorro, Oriental Mindoro
- Pahilaan, Calatagan, Pola, Oriental Mindoro
