= Buhid language =

Austronesian language spoken in Philippines

Buhid
- ᝊᝓᝑᝒ
- Native to: Philippines
- Region: Mimaropa
- Native speakers: 12,000 (2010)
- Language family: Austronesian: Malayo-Polynesian; Philippine; Greater Central Philippine; South Mangyan; Buhid
- Writing system: Buhid

Language codes
- ISO 639-3: bku
- Glottolog: buhi1245

The Buhid language (Buhid: ᝊᝓᝑᝒ) is a language spoken by Mangyans in the island of Mindoro, Philippines. It is divided into eastern and western dialects.

It uses the Buhid script, which is encoded in the Unicode-Block Buhid (Buid) (1740–175F).

== Distribution ==
Barbian (1977) lists the following locations.

- Malfalon, Calintaan, Occidental Mindoro
- Barrio Rambida, Socorro, Oriental Mindoro
- Bato Eli, Barrio Monte Claro, San José Pandurucan (on the southern bank of the Bugsanga (Bisanga) River)
- Barrio Batangan, Panaytayan, Mansalay, Oriental Mindoro

== Phonology ==
=== Consonants ===
		Labial	Alveolar	Palatal	Velar	Glottal
Plosive	voiceless	p	t		k	ʔ
Plosive	voiced	b	d		ɡ	
Nasal		m	n		ŋ	
Fricative		f	s			h
Tap			ɾ			
Lateral			l			
Approximant		w		j		

=== Vowels ===
	Front	Central	Back
Close	i		u
Mid	ɛ	ʌ	o
Open		a	

- Sounds /k, ɡ/ can be heard as fricatives [x, ɣ] in intervocalic position.

== Sources ==
- Barham, R. Marie (1958). "The phonemes of the Buhid (Mangyan) language of Eastern Mindoro, Philippines". Studies in Philippine linguistics. Oceania Linguistic Monographs. Vol. 3. University of Sydney. pp. 4–9.
- Pennoyer, F. Douglas (1979). "Buhid and Tawbuid: A new subgrouping Mindoro, Philippines". In Naylor, Paz Buenaventura (ed.). Austronesian studies: Papers from the Second Eastern Conference on Austronesian languages. Michigan Papers on South and Southeast Asia. Vol. 15. Ann Arbor: University of Michigan. pp. 265–271.
