= Hanunoo language =

Austronesian language spoken in the Philippines

Hanunoo
- Hanunó'o
- ᜱᜨᜳᜨᜳᜢ
- Pronunciation: [hanunuʔɔ]
- Native to: Philippines
- Region: Mimaropa
- Native speakers: (13,000 cited 2000)
- Language family: Austronesian: Malayo-Polynesian; Philippine; Greater Central Philippine; South Mangyan; Hanunoo
- Writing system: Hanunuo

Language codes
- ISO 639-3: hnn
- Glottolog: hanu1241

Hanunoo, or Hanunó'o (IPA: [hanunuʔɔ]), is a language spoken by Hanunoo-Mangyans on the island of Mindoro, Philippines. It is written in the Hanunoo script. Hanunoo is part of the Austronesian language family, within the cluster of Southern Mindoro languages.

== Geographic distribution ==
Hanunoo is spoken in the following locations according to Barbian (1977):

- Barrio Tugtugin, San Jose, Occidental Mindoro
- Naluak, Magsaysay, Occidental Mindoro (on the upper Caguray River)
- Bamban, Magsaysay, Occidental Mindoro (also with Ratagnon and Bisayan residents)
- Barrio Panaytayan, Mansalay, Oriental Mindoro (about 5 km (3.1 mi) from the highway in the mountains southwest of Mansalay)

== Phonology ==
=== Consonants ===
Hanunoo has 16 consonant phonemes.

Consonants
		Labial	Alveolar	Palatal	Velar	Glottal
Plosive	voiceless	p ⟨p⟩	t ⟨t⟩		k ⟨k⟩	ʔ (Note: Hanunoo does not write glottal stops.)
Plosive	voiced	b ⟨b⟩	d ⟨d⟩		ɡ ⟨g⟩	
Nasal		m ⟨m⟩	n ⟨n⟩		ŋ ⟨ng⟩	
Fricative			s ⟨s⟩			h ⟨h⟩
Trill			r ⟨r⟩			
Lateral			l ⟨l⟩			
Approximant		w ⟨w⟩		j ⟨y⟩		

=== Vowels ===
Vowels
	Front	Central	Back
Close	i ⟨i⟩		u ⟨u⟩
Mid		(ə)	
Open		a ⟨a⟩	

- /a i/ can be heard as [ə ɪ] within closed syllables.
- /u/ can be heard as [o] within word-final syllables.
- /i/ can be heard as an open-mid [ɛ] among some speakers in certain words.

=== Diphthongs ===
Hanunoo also has four diphthongs: /ai̯/, /au̯/, /iu̯/, and /ui̯/.

== Grammar and syntax ==
Pronouns in Hanunoo are inflected to indicate grammatical case, number, tense, inclusion, and person. Verbs can be inflected for grammatical aspect, active versus passive voice, and grammatical mode. Adjectives can be inflected to show different degrees of comparison.

Word order can be determined by relative importance but the most common is verb–subject–object, with passive voice being preferred.

== Color categories ==
The Hanunoo language has four basic color terms, these being mabīru (the core of which is black; also includes violet, blue, indigo, dark green and all dark shades), malagtiˀ (white; also all very light tints of other colors), mararaˀ (orange-red; also all other warm tones), and malatuy (leaf green; also mixtures of greens, yellows, and light browns). Mararaˀ and malatuy are also used to refer to "dry" or "fresh" colors; for example, a freshly cut piece of brown bamboo would be malatuy rather than mararaˀ, despite brown being a warm color.

In addition to the four primary color terms, Hanunoo has several secondary color terms. Many of these terms come from existing nouns, either by using the noun outright (bulāwan refers both to the metal gold and to a golden color) or by adding the prefix ma- (lit. "exhibiting, having, to be"). For instance, madilaw (yellow) comes from dilaw, meaning "turmeric".

To refer specifically to the core colors the word gid will be added after the initial color term, such as mabīru gid (jet black, lit. "very black"). For hues further from the focal point the second part of the word is repeated, like mabīrubīru ("somewhat black") for a shade that isn't pure black, but it still in the mabīru category. This is also done with secondary color terms, for instance madīlawdīlaw ("weak yellow").

Color is usually not considered as important as texture or light reflectivity when describing objects in Hanunoo, with many descriptions being polymorphemic.

=== Color table ===
Color name	In Hanunoo script	In English
Core Colors
Mabīru	ᜫᜪᜲᜭᜳ	Black
Malagtiɂ	ᜫᜮᜤ᜴ᜦᜲ	White
Mararaɂ	ᜫᜭᜭ	Orange-red
Malatuy	ᜫᜮᜦᜳᜬ᜴	Leaf green
Secondary colors
Baɂilanún	ᜪᜡᜮᜨᜳᜨ᜴	A burnt reddish-brown
Bulāwan	ᜪᜳᜮᜯᜨ᜴	Golden (lit. "gold"")
Bulháw	ᜪᜳᜱᜯ᜴	Light blue
Dúlas (also Madulasdúlas)	ᜧᜳᜮᜰ᜴	"Reddish, shiny"
Maɂarum	ᜫᜠᜭᜳᜫ᜴	Violet
Madapug	ᜫᜧᜩᜳᜤ᜴	Grey (lit. "to be ash/[a] hearth")
Madilaw	ᜫᜧᜲᜮᜯ᜴	Yellow (lit. "to be turmeric")
Magilang	ᜫᜤᜲᜮᜥ᜴	Iridescent greens, blues, and purples (lit. "exhibits iridescence"

== Bibliography ==
- Epo, Yrrah Jane S. (2014). Discourse Analysis of Suyot: A Hanunuo-Mangyan Folk Narrative (MA thesis). Payap University.
