= Alangan language =

Austronesian language spoken in the Philippines

Alangan
- Native to: Philippines
- Region: Mimaropa
- Native speakers: 2,150 (2002)
- Language family: Austronesian: Malayo-Polynesian; Philippine; Central Luzon (?); Northern Mindoro; Alangan

Language codes
- ISO 639-3: alj
- Glottolog: alan1249

The Alangan language is a language spoken by Mangyans in the province of Mindoro in the Philippines.

Alangan is spoken by 2,150 people in the following municipalities of north-central Mindoro (Ethnologue).

- Sablayan municipality, Mindoro Occidental Province
- Naujan municipality, Mindoro Oriental Province
- Victoria municipality, Mindoro Oriental Province

The Ayan Bekeg dialect spoken on the northeast slopes of Mount Halcon is understood by Alangan speakers throughout the area (Tweddell 1970:193).

Barbian (1977) lists the following locations.

- Casague, Santa Cruz, Occidental Mindoro
- Kulasisi (tributary of the Mompong River), near Barrio Arellano, Sablayan, Occidental Mindoro
