= Mangyan =

Ethnic groups of Mindoro Island, Philippines

Mangyan people
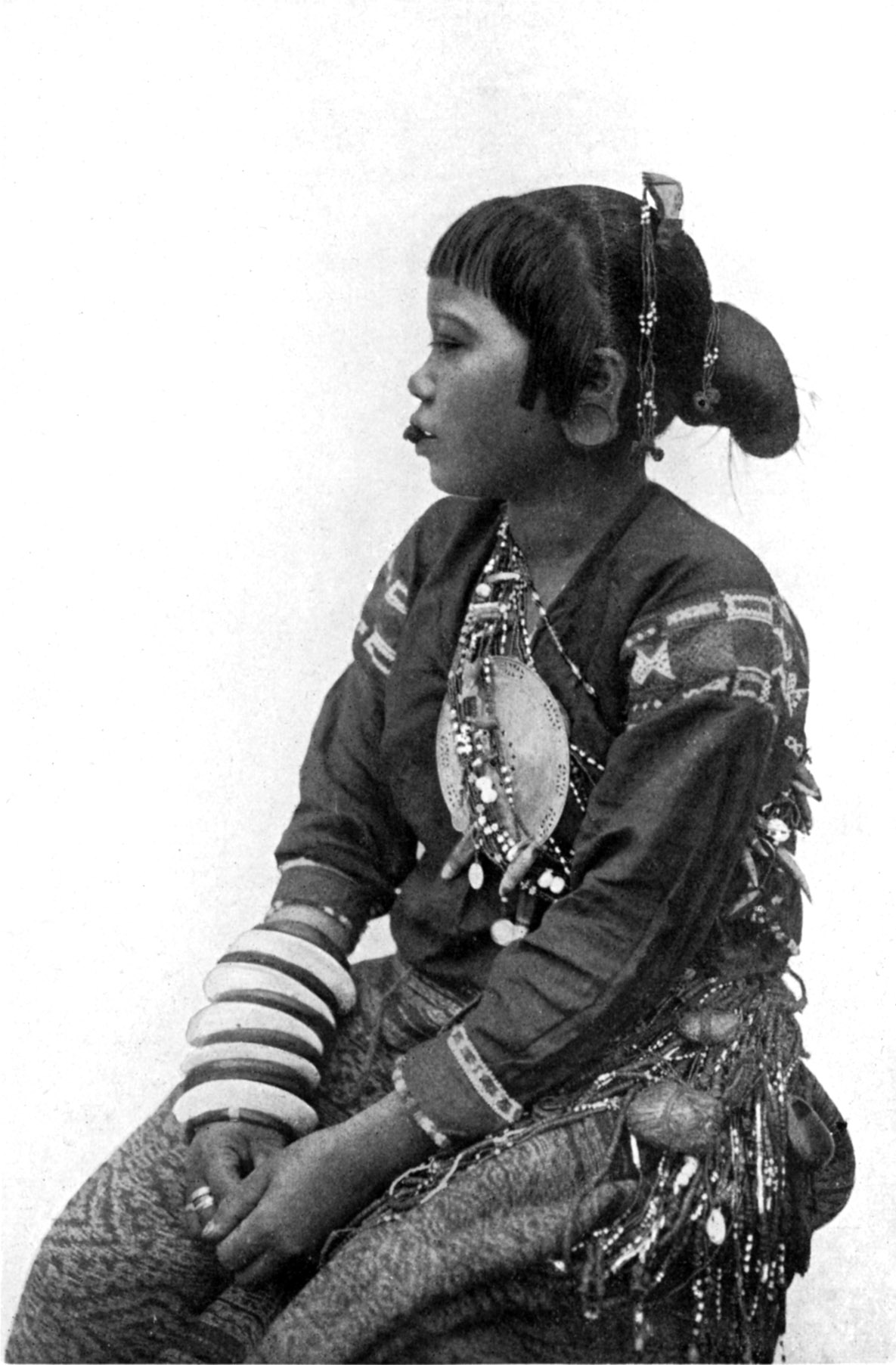
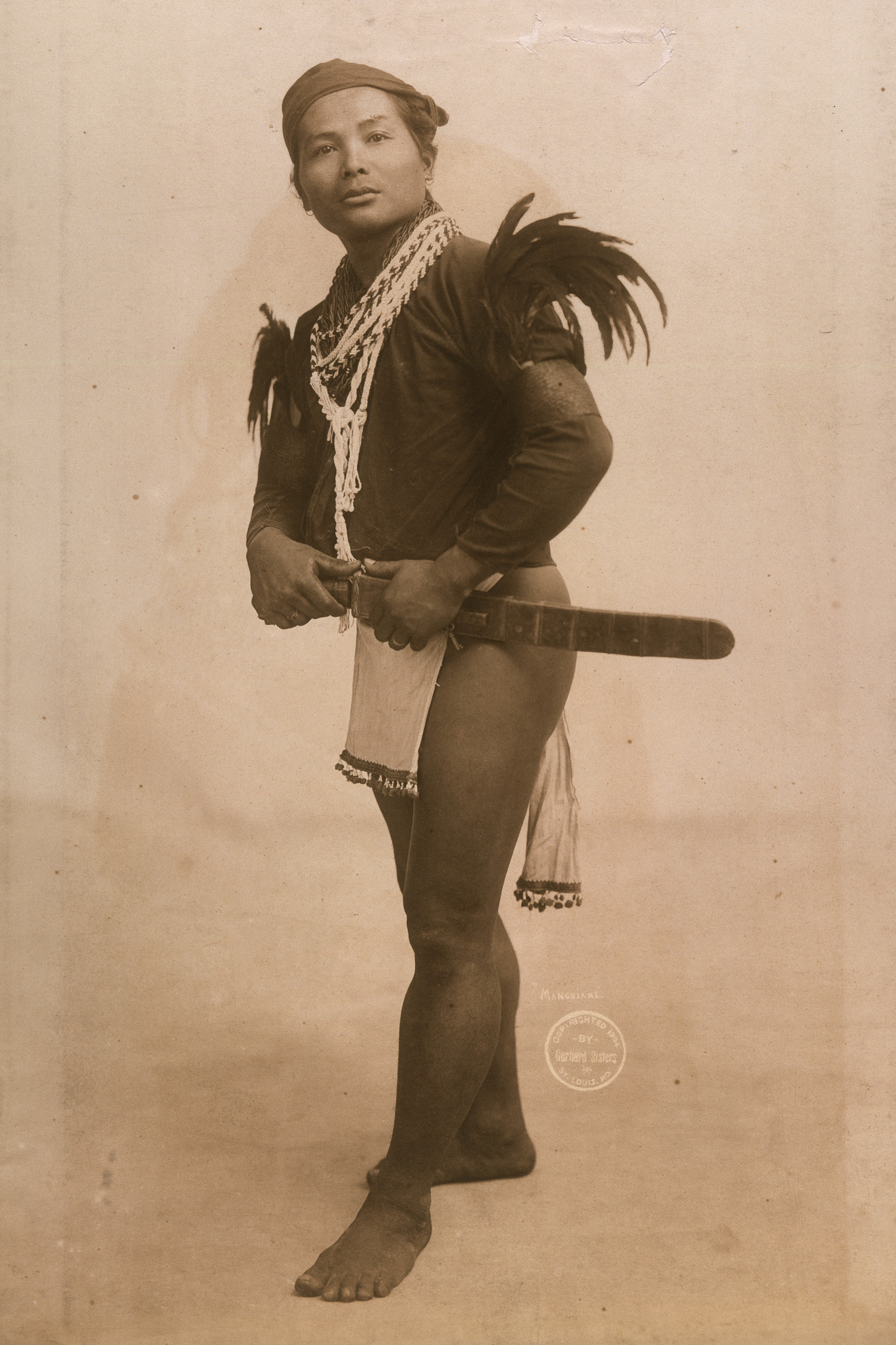
- Top: A Mangyan woman in traditional attire, c.1912; Bottom: A Mangyan man in traditional attire with bahag loincloth, c.1904

Regions with significant populations
- Philippines (Mindoro)

Languages
- Buhid, Taubuid, Hanunoo, Alangan, Iraya, Tadyawan, Tagalog, English

Religion
- Animism (majority), Christianity (Predominantly Catholic and Evangelical Protestant)

Mangyan is the generic name for the eight indigenous groups found in Mindoro each with its own tribal name, language, and customs. The total population may be around 280,001, but official statistics are difficult to determine under the conditions of remote areas, reclusive tribal groups and some having little if any outside world contact.

The ethnic groups of the island, from north to south, are: Iraya, Alangan, Tadyawan, Tawbuid (called Batangan by lowlanders on the west of the island), Buhid, and Hanunoo. An additional group on the southernmost tip is the Ratagnon, who appear to be intermarried with neighboring Bisaya (Cuyonon) lowlanders. The group known on the east of Mindoro as Bangon may be a subgroup of Tawbuid, as they speak the 'western' dialect of that language. They also have a kind of poetry called the ambahan.

== Origins ==
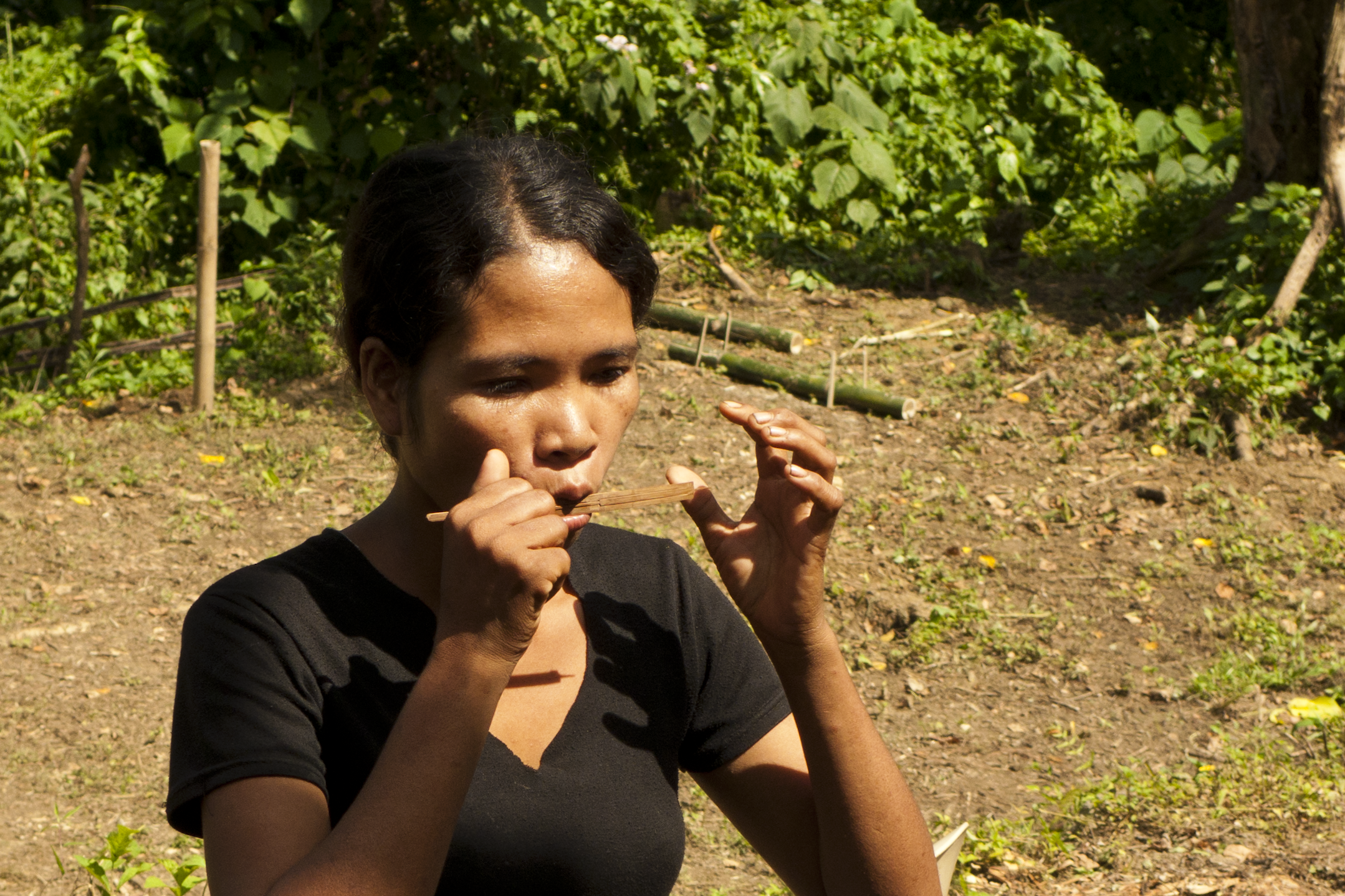
A Mangyan woman playing a mouth harp

The Mangyans were once the only inhabitants of Mindoro. Being coastal dwellers at first, they have moved inland and into the mountains to avoid the influx and influence of foreign settlers such as the Tagalogs, the Spanish and their conquests and religious conversion, and raids by the Moro. Today, the Mangyans live in relative seclusion along rivers in the highlands but periodically descend lowland to trade. Their sustenance are farming, fruit gathering, and hunting. A certain group of Mangyans living in Southern Mindoro call themselves Hanunó'o, meaning "true", "pure" or "genuine", a term that they use to stress the fact that they are strict in the sense of ancestral preservation of tradition and practices.

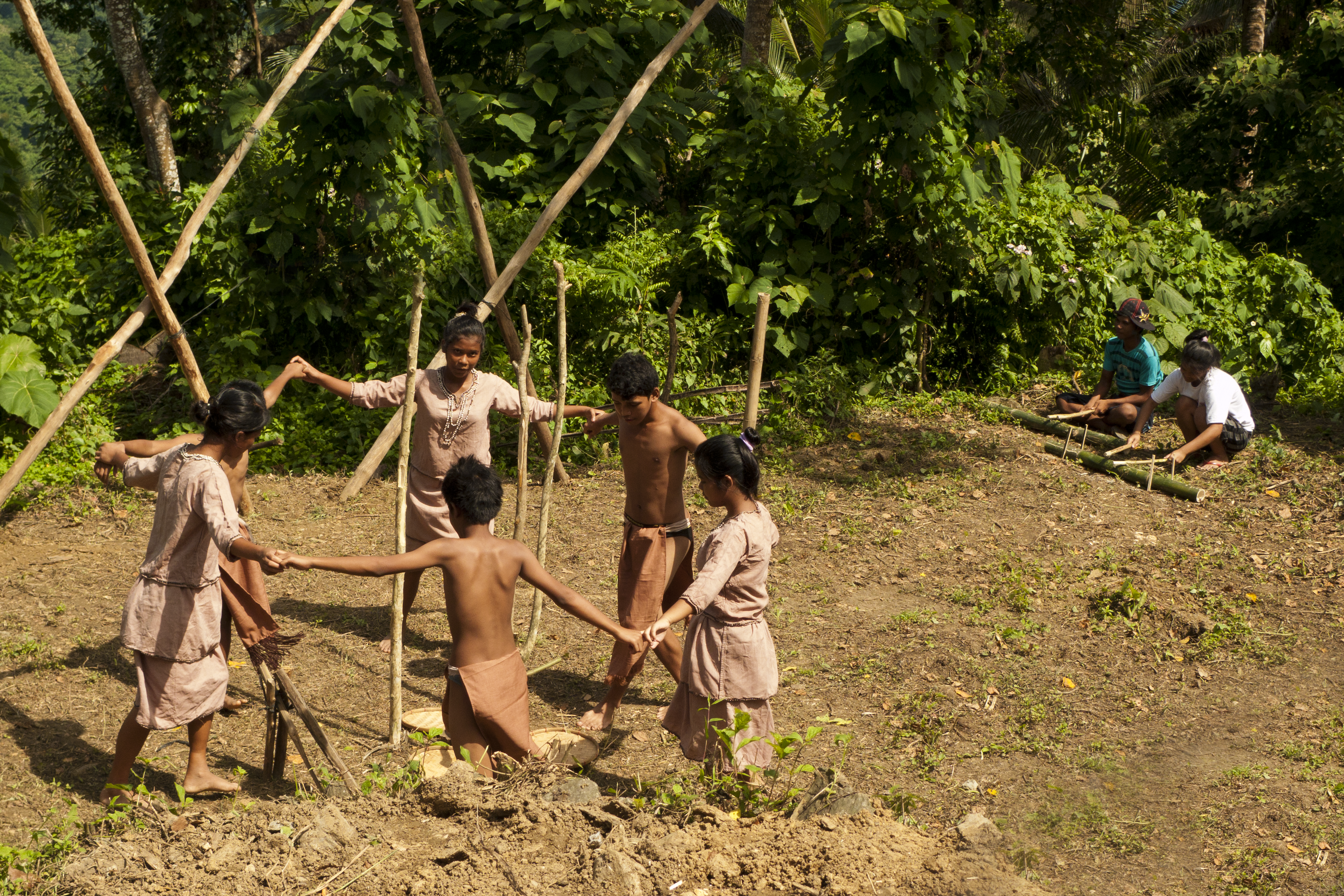
A ritual of the Iraya Mangyan to prepare land for kaingin (swidden farming)

Before the Spaniards arrived in Mindoro, the people traded with the Chinese extensively, with thousands of pieces of supporting archaeological evidence found in Puerto Galera and in written Chinese references. A division was created among the people of Mindoro when the Spaniards came. There were the Iraya Mangyans, who isolated themselves from the culture of the Spaniards, and the lowland Tagalogs who submitted themselves to Christianity. These two groups only interacted for economic matters through trading forest goods from the Mangyan and consumer goods for the lowlanders.

Despite being grouped as one tribe, Mangyans differ in many ways. In comparison to the technological advance between the two geographical divisions, the southern Mangyan are considered more advanced as seen in their use of weaving, pottery and system of writing. In contrast, the northern Mangyan are simpler in their way of living. Their language, as in the rest of the Philippines, came from the Austronesian language family. However, even if they are defined as one ethnic group, the tribes used different languages. On the average, they only share 40% of their vocabulary.

Another difference between tribes is the date of their arrival in the Philippines. A theory suggests that the southern Mangyan were already present by 900 AD while the northern Mangyan are believed to have arrived hundreds of years later. The Spanish authorities had documented their existence since their arrival in the 16th century. However, historians suggest that the Mangyans may have been the first Filipinos to trade with the Chinese. Examples of this relationship are seen in the burial caves, as porcelains and other potteries abound. However, not much ethnographic research has been made except for the tribal and linguistic differences that may lead to the indication that the tribes can be treated separately.

== Ancestral lands ==
Mangyan communities inhabit the island of Mindoro, laying claim to 40,000 hectares of forest lands. Hanunuo, Gubatnon, and Ratagnon (Hagura) Mangyan of Occidental Mindoro received a certificate of ancestral domain title (CADT) in December 2010 from President Benigno Aquino III. In July 2022, Tadyawan and Tau-buid Mangyan were the first Indigenous communities in Oriental Mindoro to receive their CADT from the National Commission on Indigenous Peoples. The title covers 3,270.78 hectares of ancestral lands in Sabang in Pinamalayan town and Buong Lupa in Gloria town. Mangyan ancestral lands have been subjected to militarization and land-grabbing while Mangyan communities have been subjected to violent attacks, arrests, and various forms of human rights violations.

== Culture and practices ==
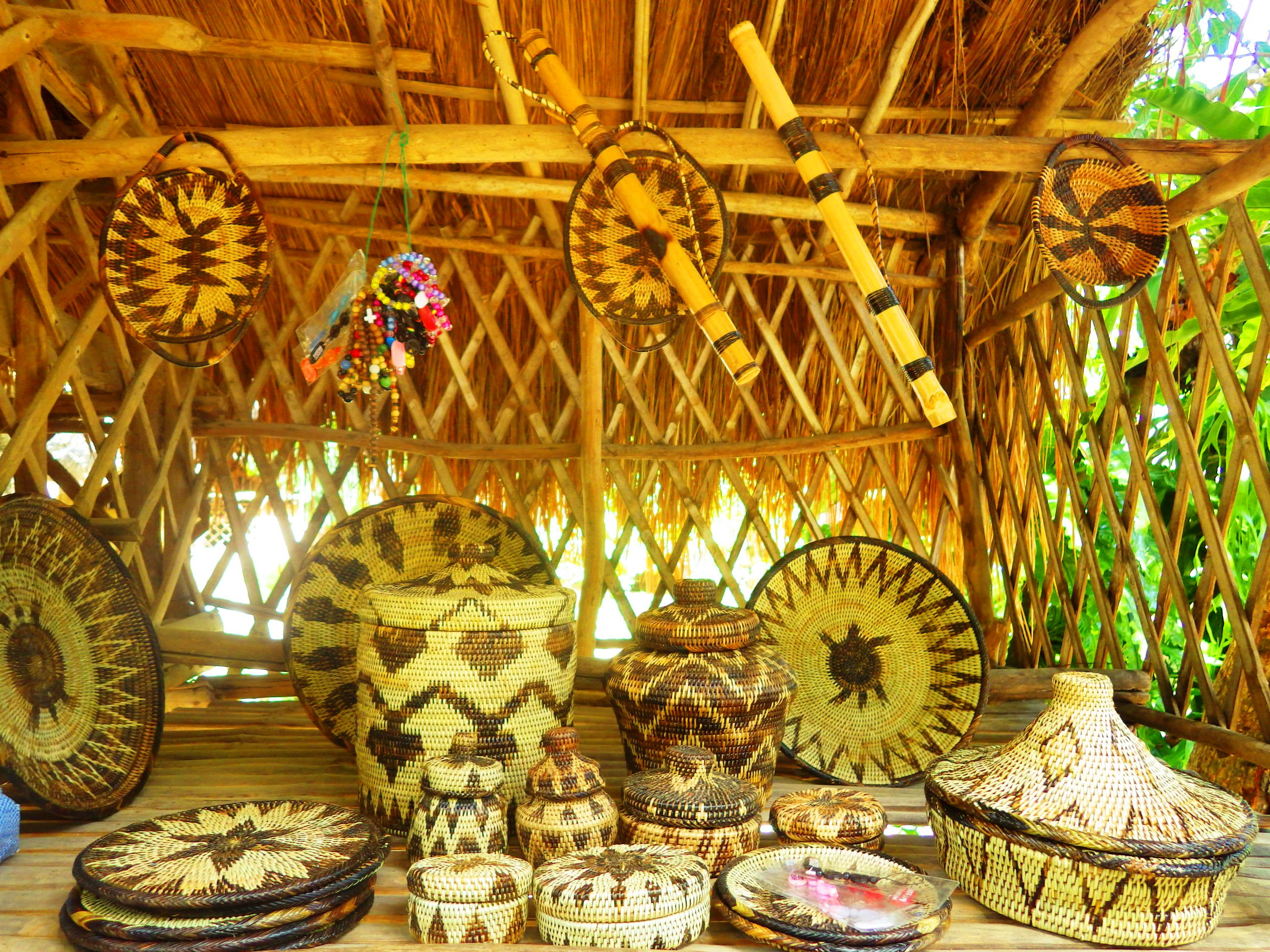
Handicrafts made by the Iraya people at the Iraya Mangyan Community Village in Talipanan, Puerto Galera, Oriental Mindoro. They are skilled basket weavers and produce crafts of high quality.

Mangyan are mainly subsistence agriculturalists, planting a variety of sweet potato, upland (dry cultivation) rice, and taro. They also trap small animals and wild pig. Many who live in close contact with lowland Filipinos sell cash crops such as bananas and ginger.

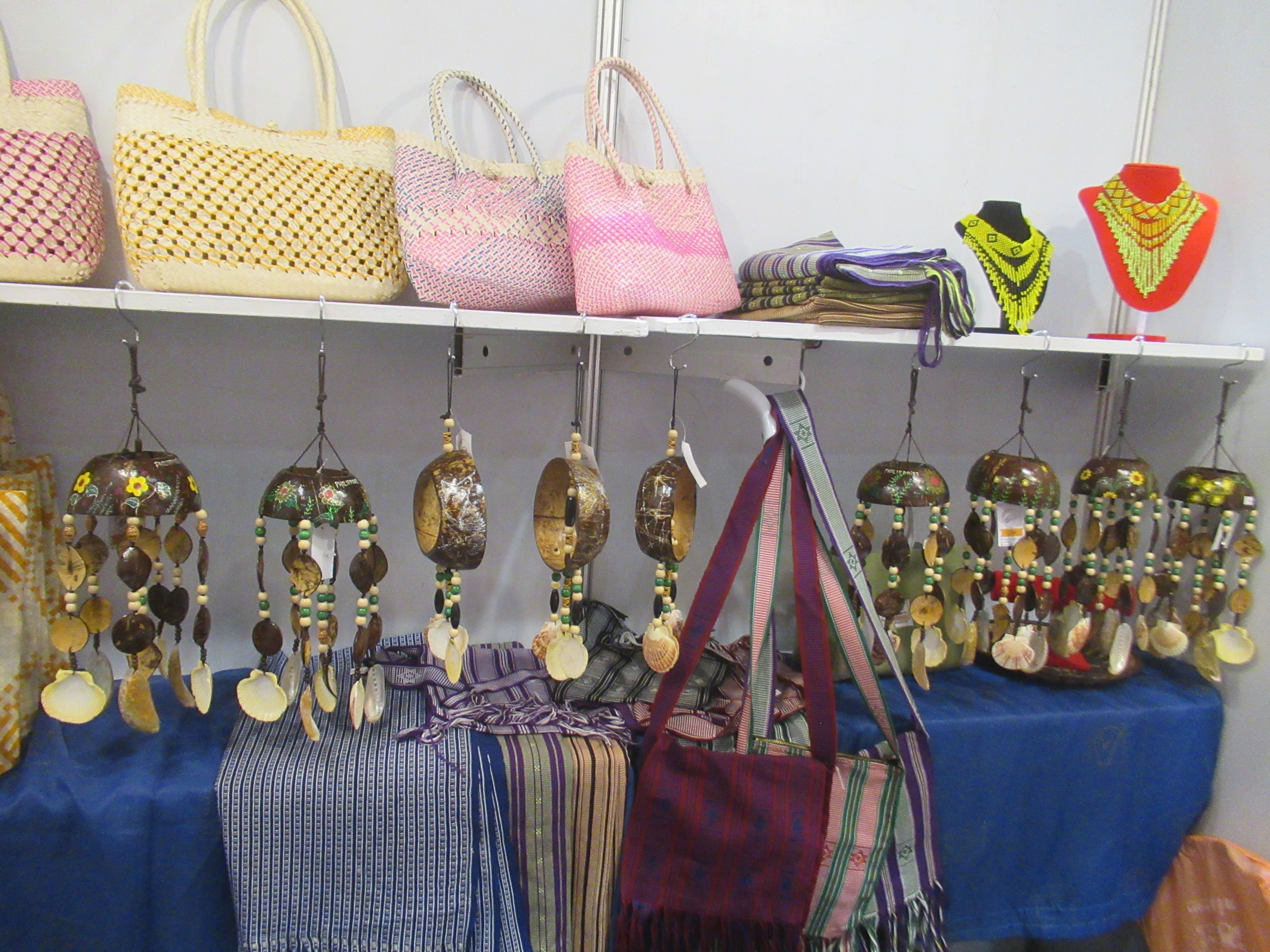
San Jose, Occidental Mindoro Mangyan inspired-handicrafts

Their languages are mutually unintelligible, though they share some vocabulary and use Hanunó'o script to write: Tawbuid and Buhid are closely related, and are unusual among Philippine languages in having an /f/ phoneme; Tawbuid is divided into eastern and western dialects; Western Tawbuid may be the only Philippine language to have no glottal phonemes, having neither /h/ or /ʔ/. They call the lowlanders or the people who live in local suburbs and plains damuong.

Their traditional religious world view is primarily animistic; around 10% have embraced Christianity, both Catholicism and Evangelical Protestantism (The New Testaments have been published in six of the Mangyan languages).

=== Storytelling ===
Historically, Mangyan stories were orally transmitted. A select group of stories were preserved in poems and written in syllabic writing. These poems were carved into materials such as bamboo with a sharp object. Practicing oral tradition came with its own set of rules for the Mangyans. For example, folk tales called suyot were only to be told after the sun had set. The Mangyans believed telling stories during daylight would lead to rotting of the teeth.

There were several distinct types of oral works that the Mangyans practiced. There are no English equivalents for the names of Mangyan story categories. English speakers have given descriptive names for these categories.

- Song poems – Contain the taboos, beliefs, and customs of the Mangyan people. These stories were used to describe the origin of customs and the importance of practicing those customs.
- Folk beliefs and customs – These stories contain the taboos, beliefs, and customs of the Mangyan people. These stories were used to describe the origin of customs and the importance of practicing those customs.
- Riddles – These stories were used for entertainment. They were mind games and comical stories told in the evening to pass the time.
- Folk tales – There were three different types of folk tales told among the Mangyan people. Suyot is the oldest of the oral traditions. They were tales of legend, folklore, and fables. Sugklanon was another type of story, acquired through Bisayan influences. Tultulanon were stories of historical events.

The Mangyans also told stories about their day-to-day life to describe the world around them. There were stories about different medicines they used, and stories used to describe the varieties and characteristics of rice they cultivated. Most of our understanding of Mangyan culture and practices is derived from these oral and written accounts.

== Indigenous Mangyan religion ==
The Mangyan have a complex spiritual belief system which includes the following deities:

- Mahal na Makaako – The Supreme Being who gave life to all human beings merely by gazing at them.
- Binayi – Owner of a garden where all spirits rest.
- Binayo – Is a sacred female spirit, caretaker of the rice spirits (kalag paray). She is married to Bulungabon. The kalag paray must be appeased to ensure a bountiful harvest. It is for this reason that specific rituals are conducted in every phase of rice cultivation. Some of these rituals include the panudlak, the rite of the first planting; the rite of rice planting itself; and the rites of harvesting which consist of the magbugkos or binding rice stalks, and the pamag-uhan, which follows the harvest.
- Bulungabon – The spirit aided by 12 fierce dogs. Erring souls are chased by these dogs and eventually drowned in a cauldron of boiling water. He is married to Binayo.

== Artifacts ==
The Indigenous Mangyans offer a myriad of culturally rich artifacts that give insight into their culture and trade. The people living in Southern Mindoro during the pre-Hispanic era are exceptional in their weaving, pottery, and system of writing. Their clothing differs between genders. The male generally wears bahag loincloths as covering for the lower body, whereas the female would wear a skirt and a shirt for the top. The terms and materials would differ from tribe to tribe, but more exceptional designs would come from the Hanunó'os. Their textiles are dyed in indigo blue, with an embroidery design called pakudos at the back, and can also be found on their woven bags.

Their system of writing, called surat Mangyan, is a pre-Hispanic syllabic system and is believed to be of Indic origin. It is still practiced today and is still being taught in different Mangyan schools of Oriental Mindoro. The Hanunó'os also practice their own traditional poetry called the ambahan, a rhythmic poetic expression with a meter of seven syllables presented through recitation and chanting or inscribed on bamboo.

== See also ==
- Ethnic groups in the Philippines
  - Indigenous peoples of the Philippines
