= Taotao =

Taotao may refer to:

Austronesian cultures

- Taotao ("little human"), carved figures of anito spirits in the Philippines
- Taotao Mona, ancestor spirits in the Marianas Islands
- Taotao, the Chamorro language word for person or people (singular and/or plural)

Other

- Taotao (TV series), Japanese anime series
- Taotao (giant panda), a Giant Panda of Jinan Zoo
