= Moehau =

Māori mythological creature

In New Zealand folklore, the moehau (also called the maeroero) is a creature said to dwell in the Coromandel Peninsula's Moehau of New Zealand's North Island. Some Māori people suggest that the creature is a descendant of the maero (sometimes described as giants or wild men of the woods), but another explanation for the moehau is that it was an exaggerated report of an escaped gorilla or baboon. An old retired seafarer who lived at Kikowhakarere had told a story of a pet baboon, on a ship anchored off the bay, which had been teased by the crew. To escape taunts it had taken refuge in the rigging. Approached by its tormentors, it leaped to the water, swam ashore and disappeared into the hills. George Dean, Director of Auckland Zoo, refuted the baboon theory, pointing out "among other things, that owing to climatic conditions and lack of suitable food such an animal as a baboon could not survive in the New Zealand bush."

However, in 1970, County Councillor Jim Reedy told Robyn Gosset that the Hairy Moehau was an exaggeration started from a joke. Also in 1970, Bob Grey told researcher Robyn Gosset that the term Moehau Monster came from a name given to a Yankee steam hauler that was utilized for logging.

== See also ==
- Maero
- Patupaiarehe
- The Catlins
