= Aitu =

Spirits, sickness or demons in Polynesian cultures

In Polynesian languages the word aitu refers to ghosts or spirits, often malevolent. The word is common to many languages of Western and Eastern Polynesia. In the mythology of Tonga, for example, ʻaitu or ʻeitu are lesser gods, many being patrons of specific villages and families. They often take the form of plants or animals, and are often more cruel than other gods. These trouble-making gods are regarded as having come from Samoa. The Tongan word tangi lauʻaitu means to cry from grief, to lament.

In Māori mythology, the word aitu refers to sickness, calamity, or demons; the related word aituā means misfortune, accident, disaster. In Tahitian, aitu (syn. atua/raitu) can mean 'god' or 'spirit'; in other languages, including Rarotongan, Samoan, Sikaiana, Kapingamarangi, Takuu, Tuamotuan, and Niuean, aitu are ghosts or spirits.

In Cook Islands Aitu is also the name of ancient tribes who came from the east.

According to tradition, some of the Aitu tribes settled on the islands of Aitutaki, Atiu and Mangaia. At Aitutaki (Aitu-taki) they were eventually destroyed or driven away. At Mangaia they were from time to time slaughtered in order to provide sacrifice to the gods. There still exists at Mangaia the remains of a great oven named te umu Aitu where large numbers of these people were cooked after being slain.

In the Samoa Islands, aitu also means ghost. In other Austronesian cultures, cognates of aitu include the Micronesian aniti, Bunun hanitu, Filipino and Tao anito, and Malaysian and Indonesian hantu or antu.

== See also ==
- Atua
- Kupua
- Nuku-mai-tore
- Polynesian mythology
- Taotao Mona
- Tui Fiti
- Ghosts in Polynesian culture
