= Anito =

Spirits and deities in indigenous Philippine folk religions

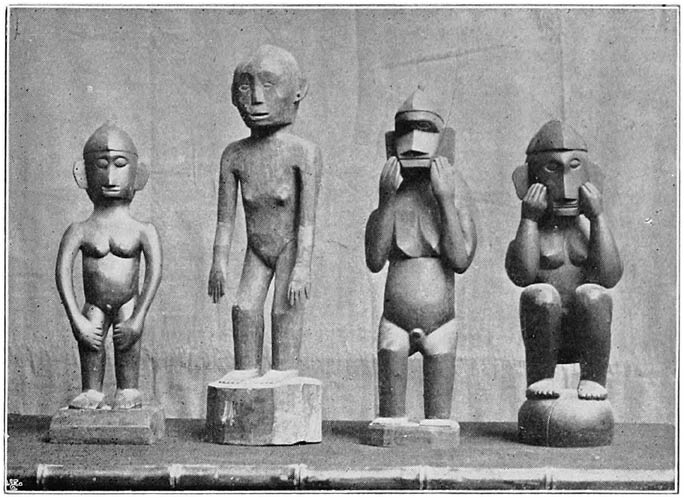
Various Igorot bulul depicting ancestor spirits (c. 1900)

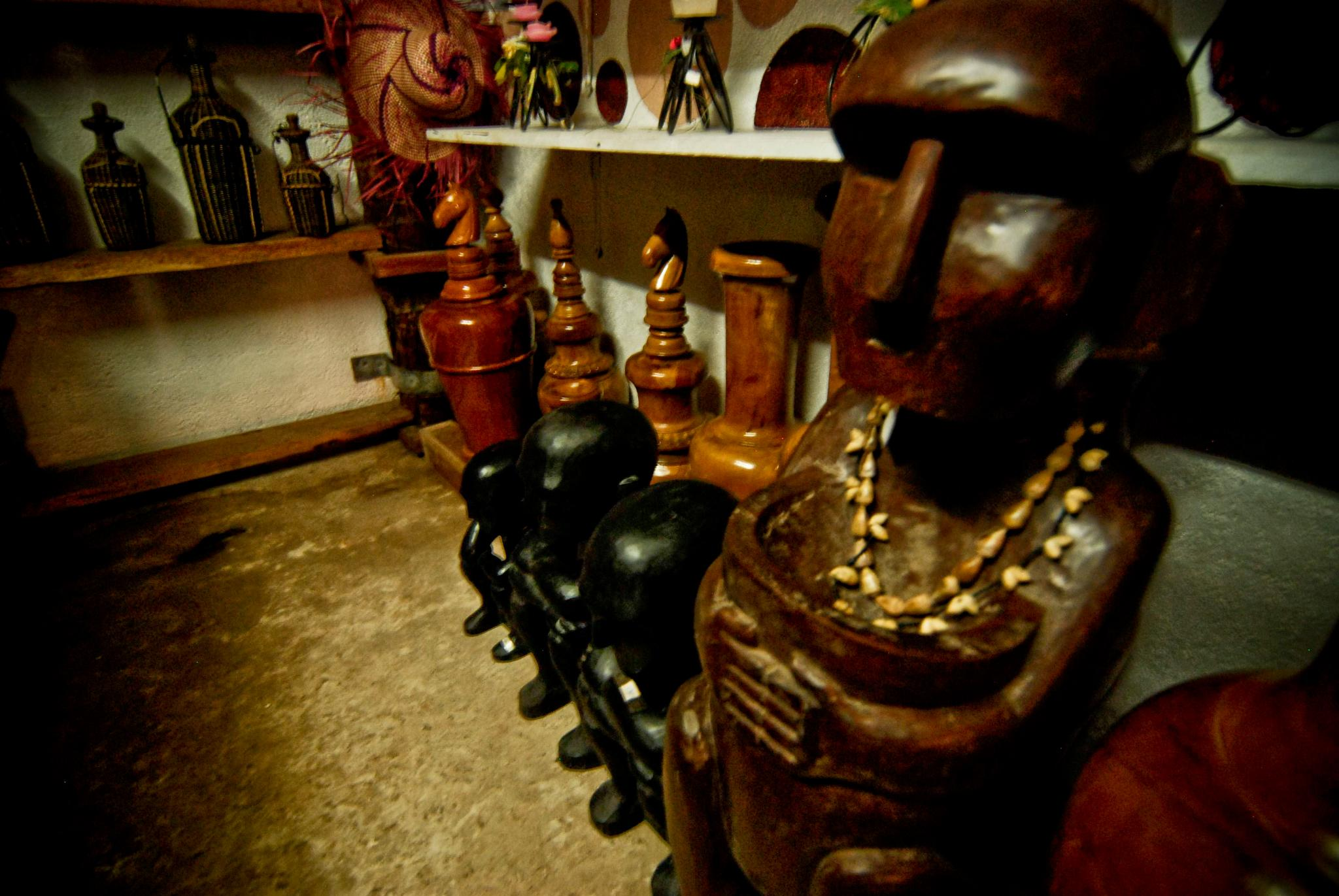
Taotao carvings sold in a souvenir shop in Siquijor Island

Anito, also spelled anitu, refers to ancestor spirits, nature spirits, and deities in the Indigenous Philippine folk religions from the precolonial age to the present, although the term itself may have other meanings and associations depending on the Filipino ethnic group. It can also refer to carved humanoid figures, the taotao, made of wood, stone, or ivory, that represent these spirits. Anito (a term predominantly used in Luzon) is also sometimes known as diwata in certain ethnic groups (especially among Visayans).

Pag-anito refers to a séance, often accompanied by other rituals or celebrations, in which a shaman (Visayan: babaylan, Tagalog: katalonan) acts as a medium to communicate directly with the dead ancestors and spirits. When a nature spirit or deity is specifically involved, the ritual is called pagdiwata. The act of worship or a religious sacrifice to a spirit and deities.

The belief in anito are sometimes referred to as Anitism in scholarly literature (Spanish: anitismo or anitería).

== Spirits ==
Pre-colonial Filipinos were animistic. They believed that everything has a spirit, from rocks and trees to animals and humans to natural phenomena. These spirits are collectively known as anito, derived from Proto-Malayo-Polynesian *qanitu and Proto-Austronesian *qaNiCu ("spirit of the dead"). Cognates in other Austronesian cultures include the Micronesian aniti, Malaysian and Indonesian hantu or antu, Nage nitu, and Polynesian atua and aitu. As well as Tao anito, Taivoan alid, Seediq and Atayal utux, Bunun hanitu or hanidu, and Tsou hicu among Taiwanese aborigines. Anito can be divided into two main categories: the ancestor spirits (ninunò), and deities and nature spirits (diwata).

=== Ancestor spirits ===
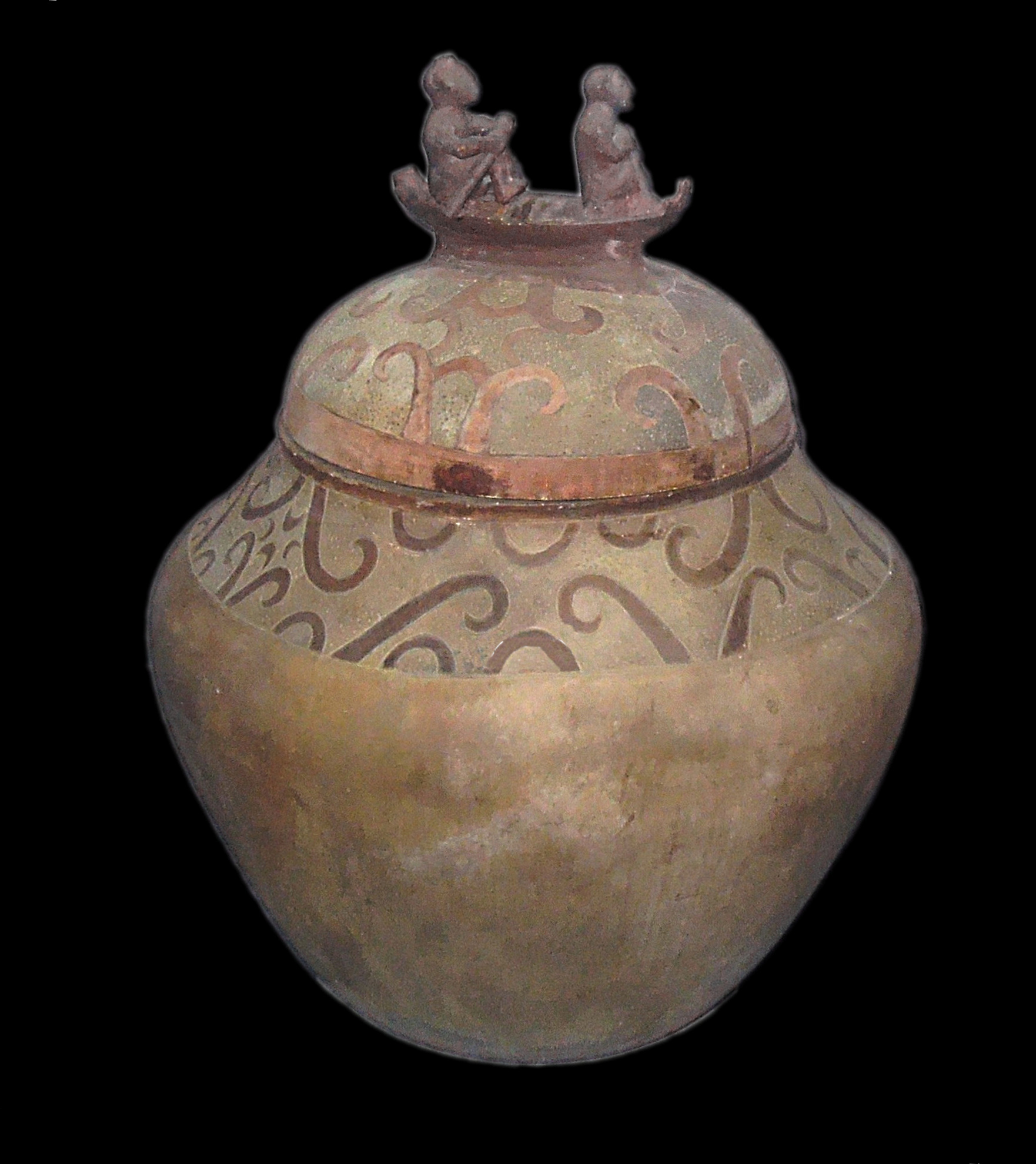
The Neolithic Manunggul burial jar from the Tabon Caves, Palawan, depicts a soul and a psychopomp journeying to the spirit world in a boat (c. 890–710 BCE)

The ninunò (lit. "ancestor") can be the spirits of actual ancestors, cultural heroes, or generalized guardian spirits of a family. Pre-colonial Filipinos believed that upon death, the "free" soul (Visayan: kalag; Tagalog: kaluluwa) (Note: Among most Filipino ethnic groups, a person is believed to be composed of at least two souls – the breath of life, will, or awareness (ginhawa or hininga, which stays with the living body) and the astral soul (kalag or kaluluwa, which can travel to the spirit world). The concept of soul dualism is sometimes referred to as "twin souls" or "double souls" and is a common belief in Austronesian cultures and other shamanistic cultures. Other names for the life soul include nyawa or nyawalihan (Tausug), niyawa (Maranao), niyawa-lihan (Jama Mapun), lennawa (Batad Ifugao), and nawa (T'boli). Other names for the astral soul include kaluha, dungan (Visayan); kalag (Bicol); kaduwa (Isneg), ab-abiik (Kankanaey), karurua (Ilocano), ikaruruwa (Ibanag), karaduwa (Mangyan), kiyaraluwa (Tagbanwa), makatu (Bukidnon), and kadengan-dengan or gimokud (Manobo). (Scott, 1994; Tan, 2008; Mercado, 1991; Talavera, 2014) Most of the terms for the astral soul literally translate to "twin" or "double", from PAN *duSa, "two". (Yu, 2000; Blust, 2010)) of a person travels to a spirit world, usually by voyaging across an ocean on a boat (a bangka or baloto).

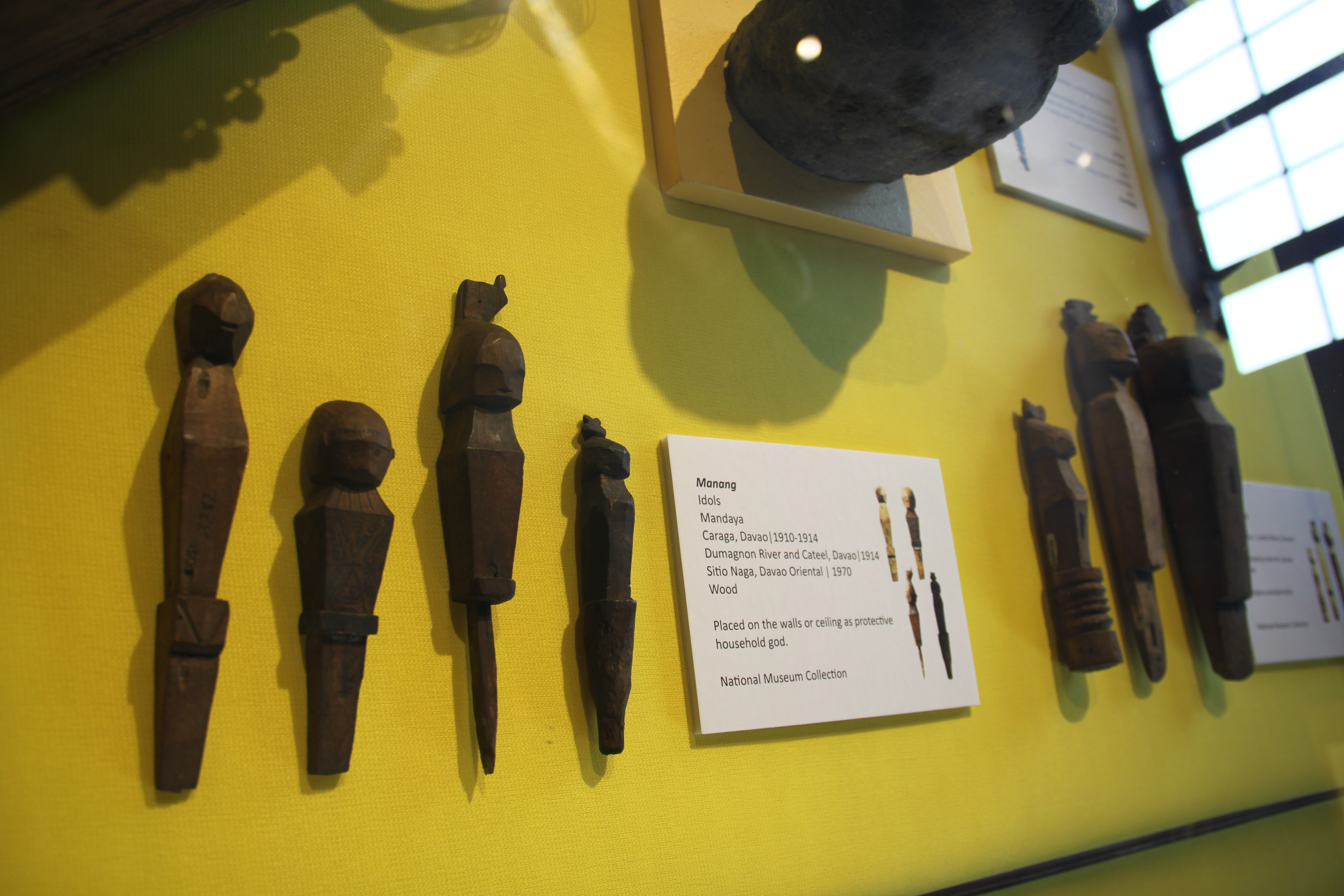
Manang carved images of household guardian spirits from the Mandaya people

There can be multiple locations in the spirit world, varying in different ethnic groups. (Note: Compare with the Greek underworld) Which place souls end up in depends on how they died, the age at death, or the conduct of the person when they were alive. There was no concept of heaven or hell prior to the introduction of Christianity and Islam; (Note: After Spanish contact, various spirit worlds were syncretized into the Christian concept of heaven and hell in dictionaries and Bible translations. They struggled in determining which terminology to use because of the absence of the heaven and hell dichotomy in the Filipino concept of the spirit world. Spanish missionaries and European authors usually equated heaven with maca and calualhatian; and hell with casan (also casanaan, casauaan, or catanaan; sometimes misread as kasamaan). However, in the Boxer Codex maca and casan were synonyms for the Visayan and Tagalog underworlds. The 1754 version of Vocabulario de la lengua tagala used casanaan for both heaven and hell; with casanaan nang hirap as hell, and casanaan nang tova as heaven. Calualhatian (modern spelling: kaluwalhatian) was simply a region in the Tagalog spirit world that souls can enter by crossing a torrential river on a narrow plank. (Rath, 2013)) rather, the spirit world is usually depicted as an otherworld that exists alongside the material world. Souls reunite with deceased relatives in the spirit world and lead normal lives in the spirit world as they did in the material world. In some cases, the souls of evil people undergo penance and cleansing before they are granted entrance into a particular spirit realm. Souls would eventually reincarnate after a period of time in the spirit world.

In some cultures (like among the Kalinga people), the acceptance of a soul by ancestors into a certain realm in the spirit world requires tattoos (batok), by which they can gauge the worthiness of a soul. In other cultures, tattoos illuminate and guide the spirits during the journey to the afterlife.

Souls in the spirit world still retain a degree of influence in the material world, and vice versa. Pag-anito may be used to invoke good ancestor spirits for protection, intercession (kalara or kalda), or advice. Ancestor spirits that become intercessors with deities are known as pintakasi or pitulon. Vengeful spirits of the dead can manifest as apparitions or ghosts (mantiw) (Note: Also mua, mamaw, mamanhig, pamahoy, mamamahoy (McCoy, 1982); later multo. from Spanish muerto, "dead person" (Tan, 2008)) and cause harm to living people. Pag-anito can be used to appease or banish them. Ancestor spirits also figured prominently during illness or death, as they were believed to be the ones who call the soul to the spirit world, guide the soul (a psychopomp), or meet the soul upon arrival.

Ancestor spirits are also known as kalading among the Igorot; tonong among the Maguindanao and Maranao; umboh among the Sama-Bajau; nunò or umalagad among Tagalogs and Visayans; nonò among Bicolanos; umagad or umayad among the Manobo; and tiladmanin among the Tagbanwa.

=== Nature spirits and deities ===
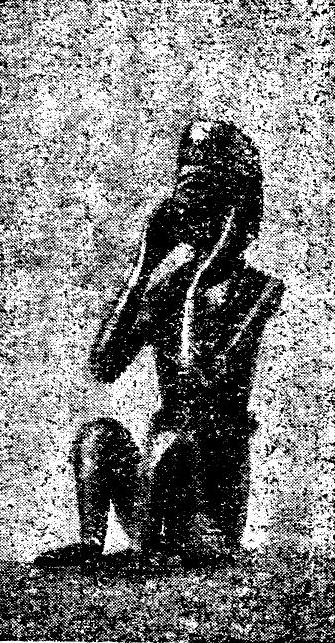
A golden anito figurine of the Igorot people, from the mines of Suyoc, Mankayan, Benguet (1909)

Spirits that have never been human are differentiated in some ethnic groups as diwata. These spirits can range from simple spirits like the diwata of a particular inanimate object, plant, animal, or place, (Note: e.g. Nuno sa punso, a dwarf-like anito that lives in anthills; and Dayang Masalanta, the Tagalog diwata of Mount Makiling) to deities who personify abstract concepts and natural phenomena, (Note: e.g. Mayari, the Tagalog goddess of the moon; Barangaw, the Visayan god of rainbows; and Makapatag, the Visayan god of vengeance) to deities who are part of an actual pantheon. (Note: e.g. Bathala, the chief deity of the Tagalogs; Magbabaya, the supreme creator of the Lumad people; and Pilandok, trickster spirit of the Maranao) They are also known as dewatu, divata, duwata, ruwata, dewa, dwata, diya, etc., in various Philippine languages (including Tagalog diwa, "spirit" or "essence"); all of which are derived from Sanskrit devata (देवता) or devá (देव), meaning "deity". These names are the result of syncretization with Hindu-Buddhist beliefs due to the indirect cultural exchange (via Srivijaya and Majapahit) between the Philippines and South Asia.

However, what entities are considered diwata varies by ethnic group. In some ethnic groups like the B'laan, Cuyonon Visayans, and the Tagalog, Diwata refers to the supreme being in their pantheon, (Note: Tagalogs differentiated between Diwata, the universal supreme being, and life creator Bathala, the supreme deity exclusive to them (Hislop, 1971)) in which case there are different terms for non-human spirits. (Note: The most widespread names for these spirits in various Philippine ethnic groups are diwata or anito. Other names of diwata or specific types of diwata include fieu awas, kahoynon (B'laan); mahomanay, tahamaling (Bagobo); panya'en (Batak); tawong lipod, magindara (Bikol); magtitima, tawo sa talonan (Bukidnon); aled (Gaddang); annani (Ibanag); bakayauwan, monduntug, palasekan, pili, pinading (Ifugao); mangmangkit, katataoan/katawtaw-an, kibaan, litao (Ilocano); apdel, sasailo (Itneg); tumungaw (Kankana-ey); laman labuad, manglilili (Kapampangan); kama-kama/kamakaon (Karay-a); tuglinsau, tagbusau, mandangum (Mandaya); andagaw (Mangyan); tawagenen, manaog (Manobo); karibang (Maranao); kaybaan (Pangasinan); kamanan-daplak (Sambal); dayamdam, piritay (Tagalog); tawo sa talonan (Tagbanwa); lewenri, bawa, katao/kataw, tumawo/tamawo, tawong lupa (Visayan); and guban-on, digkusanon, dalaketnon (Waray).) Like in ancestor spirits, diwata are referred to in polite kinship titles when addressed directly, like apo ("elder") or nuno ("grandparent").

There are three general types of non-human spirits. The first are the environmental or nature spirits "bound" to a particular location or natural phenomenon (similar to genii loci). They "own" places and concepts like agricultural fields, forests, cliffs, seas, winds, lightning, or realms in the spirit world. Some were also "keepers" or totems of various animals and plants. They have inhuman and abstract qualities, reflecting their particular dominions. They do not normally appear in human form and are usually gender-less or androgynous. They rarely concern themselves with human affairs. Rituals involving these spirits are almost always conducted outdoors.

The second type of spirits are the "unbound" spirits which have independent existence. They appear in animal (usually as birds) or human-like forms, have gender differentiation, and have personal names. They are most similar to the elves and fairies of European folklore. (Note: With strong parallels to human-like beings like elves and aos sí, as well as diminutive human-like beings like brownies and pixies. (Buenconsejo, 2002)) These are the most common types of spirits to become abyan (spirit guides of babaylan), as they are the most "sociable" and can take interest in human activities. These spirits are usually referred to as engkanto (from Spanish encanto) in modern Filipino folklore. Unlike the "bound" spirits, these spirits can be invited into human households, and their rituals can take place both outdoors and indoors.

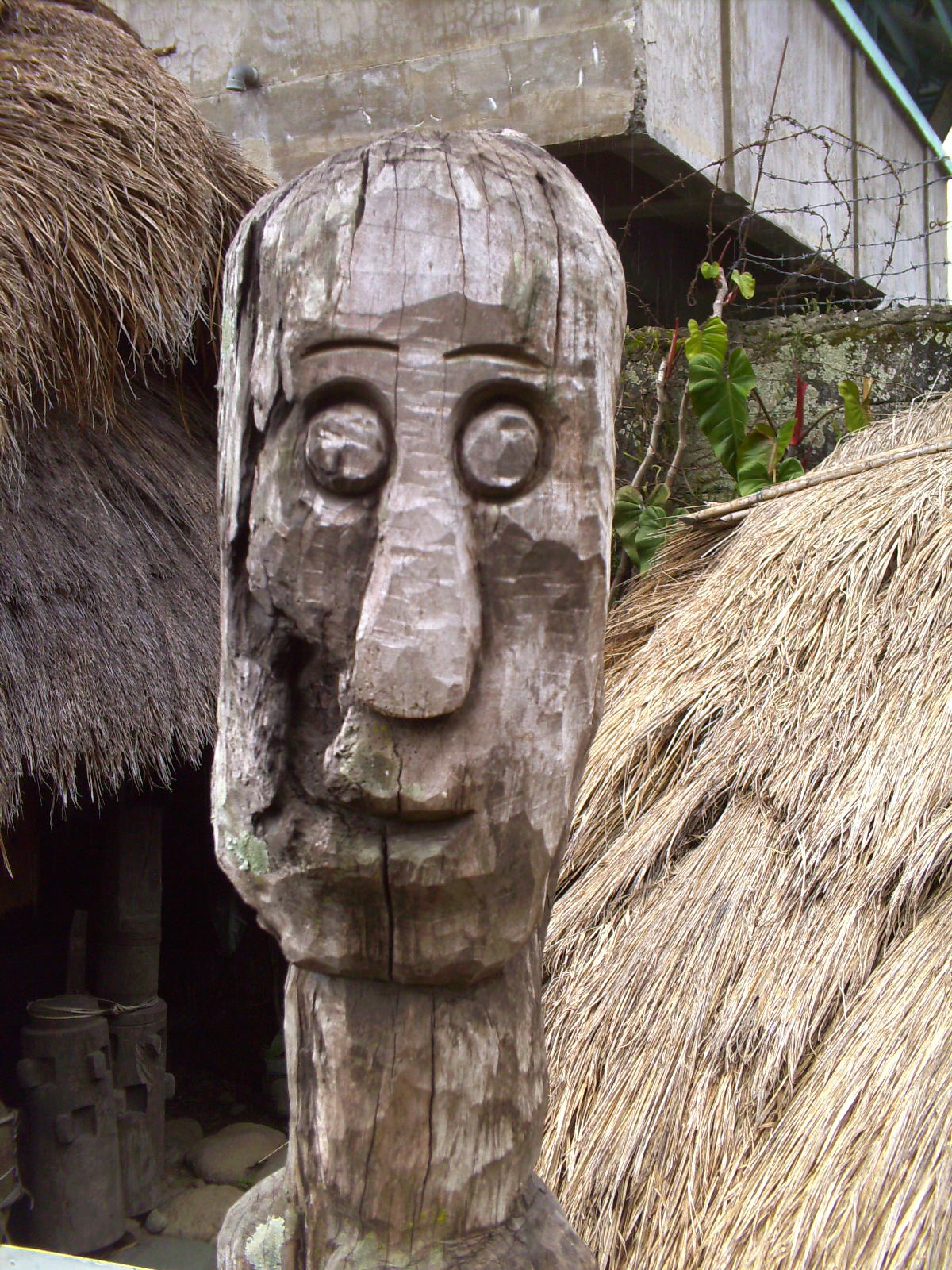
A fertility god of the Bontoc people in an ato (communal meeting circle)

The last is a class of malevolent spirits or demons, as well as supernatural beings, generally collectively known as aswang, yawa, or mangalos (also mangalok, mangangalek, or magalos) among Tagalogs and Visayans. There are numerous kinds of aswang with specific abilities, behavior, or appearance. Examples include sigbin, wakwak, tiyanak, and manananggal. The first two categories of diwata can also be malevolent, what sets the third category apart is that they can not be appealed to with offerings and they are utterly pitiless. Most practices associated with them is to ward them off, banish them, or destroy them. They are never addressed nor worshiped in religious rituals.

Diwata are rarely spoken about openly for fear of attracting their attention. Instead they are referred to with euphemisms like "those unlike us" (Visayan: dili ingon nato) or various names, like banwaanon or taga-banwa, (Note: Not to be confused with the Tagbanwa and Mamanwa ethnic groups, all derived from PAN *banua, "home" or "homeland". In modern Filipino languages, banwa has been supplanted by Spanish lugar, thus taglugar is used in place of tagabanwa (Hislop, 1971; Tan, 2008).) that translate literally to "dweller of a place". Among Tagalogs, non-human nature spirits are also euphemistically referred to as lamanglupa ("[dwellers of] the bowels of the earth") or lamangdagat ("[dwellers of] the depths of the sea"), depending on their domain.

Diwata exist in both the material world and the spirit world. They can be formless or have a material body. They can also take over a body through spirit possession (Visayan: hola, hulak, tagdug, or saob; Tagalog: sanib), an ability essential for the séances in pag-anito. They are believed to be capable of shapeshifting (baliw or baylo), becoming invisible, or creating visions or illusions (anino or landung, lit. "shadow"). Their powers, however, are limited to their particular domain. A diwata of a forest, for instance, has no dominion over the sea. Most are generally benevolent or capriciously neutral, although they can cause misfortunes and illnesses if angered, disrespected, or mistakenly encountered. Other common characteristics of diwata are that they are perceived as an invisible "cold" presence (in contrast to "warm" human spirits); that they leave no footprints (unlike human spirits); and that they sense the world and "eat" by means of smelling. (Note: Diwata can cause harm by "eating" (smelling) the "vital force" or "breath" (ginhawa) of human beings. They are also said to be annoyed by perfume, as well as salt and spices. (Buenconsejo, 2002)) Diwata who take human form are said to be pale-skinned and could be distinguished from humans by the absence of a philtrum on the upper lip.

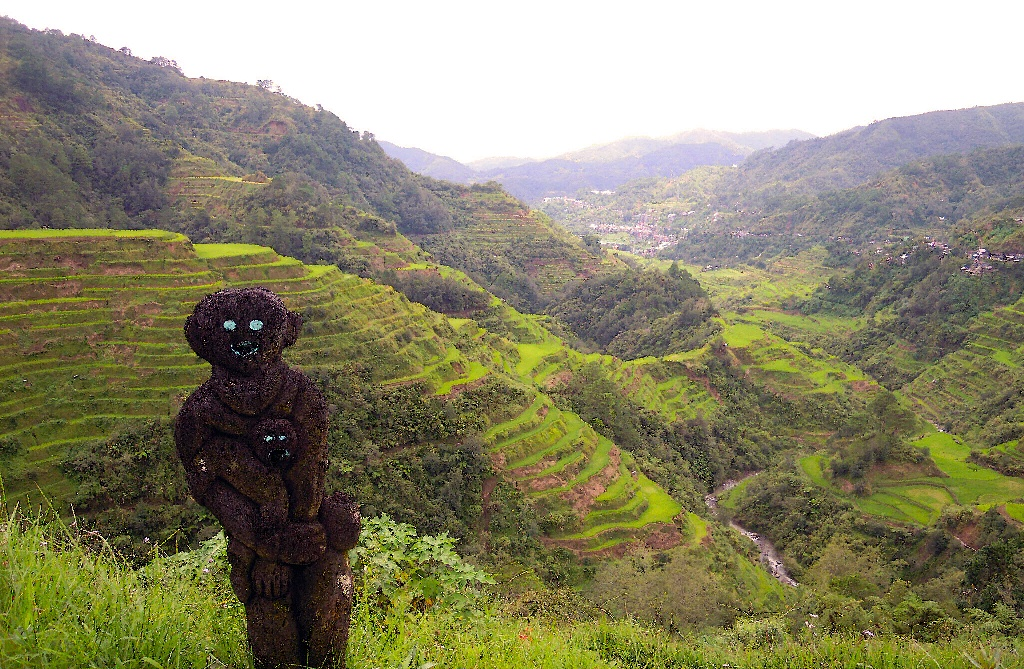
Ifugao hogang in the Banaue Rice Terraces, guardian spirits carved from tree fern trunks usually placed along pathways and in village outskirts

Diwata are often depicted as appearing to unsuspecting people in human or animal form, sometimes causing unintentional harm. They can also deliberately play tricks on mortals, like seducing or abducting beautiful men and women into the spirit world. Certain places are believed to be owned by diwata or are borders to the spirit world. These are normally avoided or only entered with precautions, especially during twilight when diwata are believed to cross over from the spirit world into the material world. Harm or illness caused by diwata are known as buyag in Visayan and usog in Tagalog. People who were harmed by interactions with diwata are euphemistically described as having been "greeted" (Visayan: gibati, Tagalog: nabati) or "played with" (Visayan gidulaan, Tagalog: napaglaruan or nakatuwaan) by diwata.

To avoid inadvertently angering a diwata, Filipinos perform a customary pasintabi sa nuno ("respectfully apologizing or asking permission from ancestors for passing"). (Note: From sintabi, "to respectfully ask permission" or "to give due respect", cf. "excuse me") This is done by saying the phrase "tabi po" or "tabi apo" ("by your permission, elder") (Note: In Ilocano, the traditional phrase is "bari bari, apo", with the same meaning (Tan, 2008)) when passing by a place believed to be inhabited by a diwata.

Conversely, it was customary to call out "tao po ako" ("I am a human") before asking for permission to enter someone's household, to reassure the homeowner of your humanity. This was due to the belief that shapeshifting supernatural beings will trick people into letting them enter their homes, but are incapable of declaring themselves as humans. Over time, this has shortened to the modern form "tao po," which is now used as a simple greeting to alert someone of your presence.

Diwata are also believed to be able to mate with humans. People born with congenital disorders (like albinism or syndactyly) or display unusual beauty or behavior are commonly believed by local superstition to be the children of diwata who seduced (or sometimes raped) their mothers.

During the Spanish period, diwata were syncretized with elves and fairies in European mythology and folklore, and were given names like duende (goblin or dwarf), encantador or encanto ("spell [caster]"), hechicero ("sorcerer"), sirena ("mermaid"), or maligno ("evil [spirit]"). In Islamized ethnic groups of the Philippines, these nature spirits are usually called jinn or saitan, due to the influence of Islamic mythology.

== Religious objects and places ==
=== Taotao figures ===
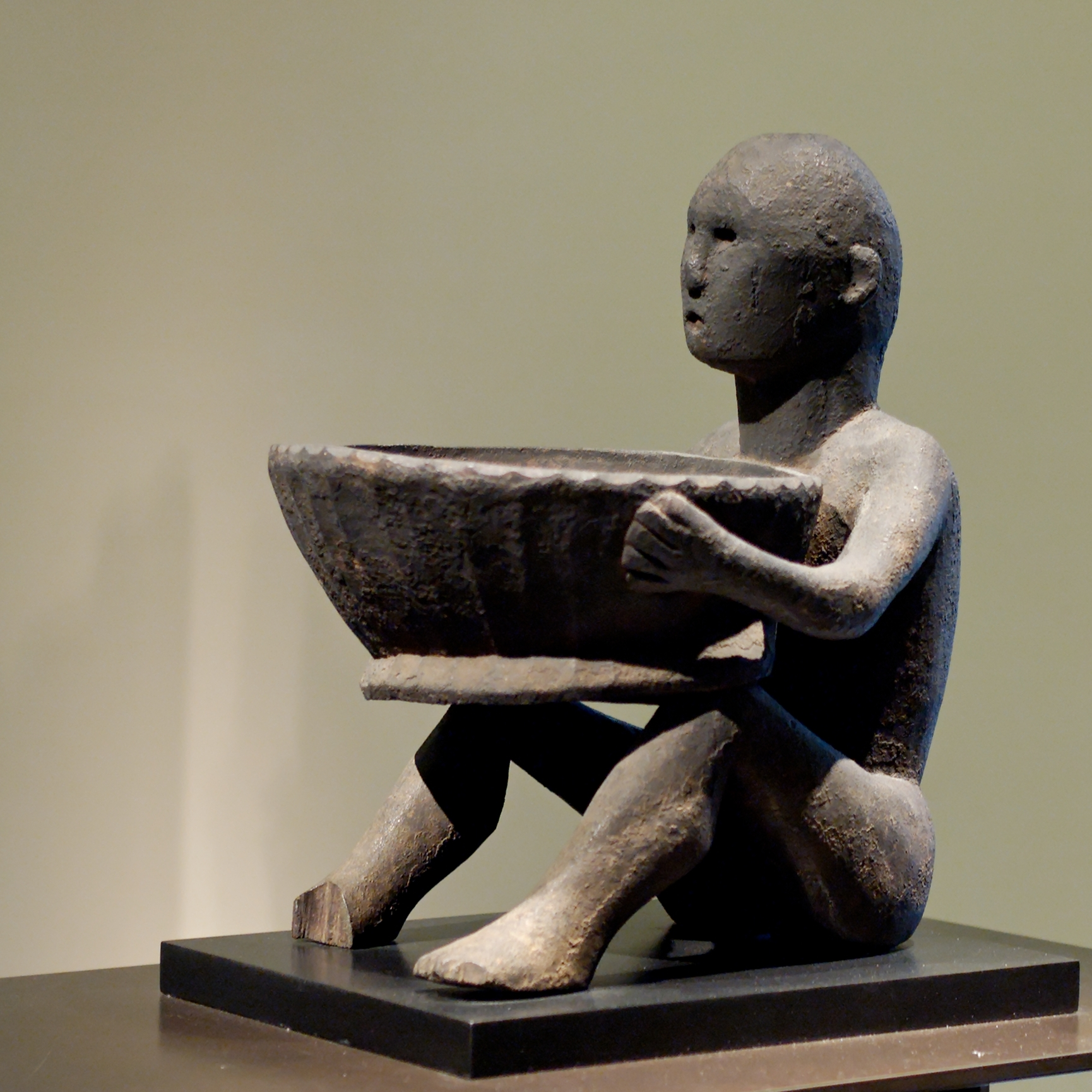
15th century bulul with a pamahan (ceremonial bowl) in the Louvre Museum

Ancestor spirits were usually represented by carved figures. These were known as taotao ("little human", also taotaohan, latawo, tinatao, or tatao), (Note: From Proto-Malayo-Polynesian *tau, ultimately from Proto-Austronesian *Cau, "human" or "person"; compare with Toraja tau tau statues) bata-bata ("little child"), ladaw ("image" or "likeness"; also laraw, ladawang, lagdong, or larawan), or likha ("creation"; also likhak) in most of the Philippines. Other names include bulul (also bulol or bul-ul) among the Ifugao; tinagtaggu (also tinattaggu) among the Kankanaey and Tuwali Ifugao; (Note: Tinagtaggu is a cognate of taotao in the Tuwali language; from tagu, "human") lablabbon among the Itneg; manaug among the Lumad; and tagno among Bicolanos. Among Tagalogs, taotao were also sometimes referred to as lambana ("altar" or "sacred place"), (Note: The term lambana was later syncretized with fairies, commonly depicted as tiny winged beings in modern illustrations. homonym for the alternate term dambana has come to mean "shrine" or "chapel" in modern Tagalog) after the location in which they are usually kept.

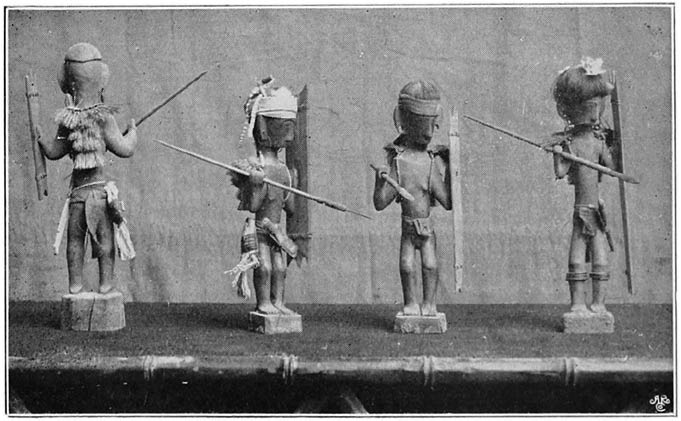
Igorot hipag depicting war deities (c. 1900)

Taotao were usually austere roughly-carved figures made from wood, stone, or ivory. Some taoatao encountered by the Spanish were made from precious metals or ornamented with gold and jewelry, but these were very rare. Taotao were almost always depicted in the squatting position with the arms crossed over the knees, which is reminiscent of the fetal position, the everyday conversing posture, and the position bodies are arranged during death among Ancient Filipinos. Some figures, however, are depicted standing or doing everyday activities like dancing, pounding rice, or nursing infants.

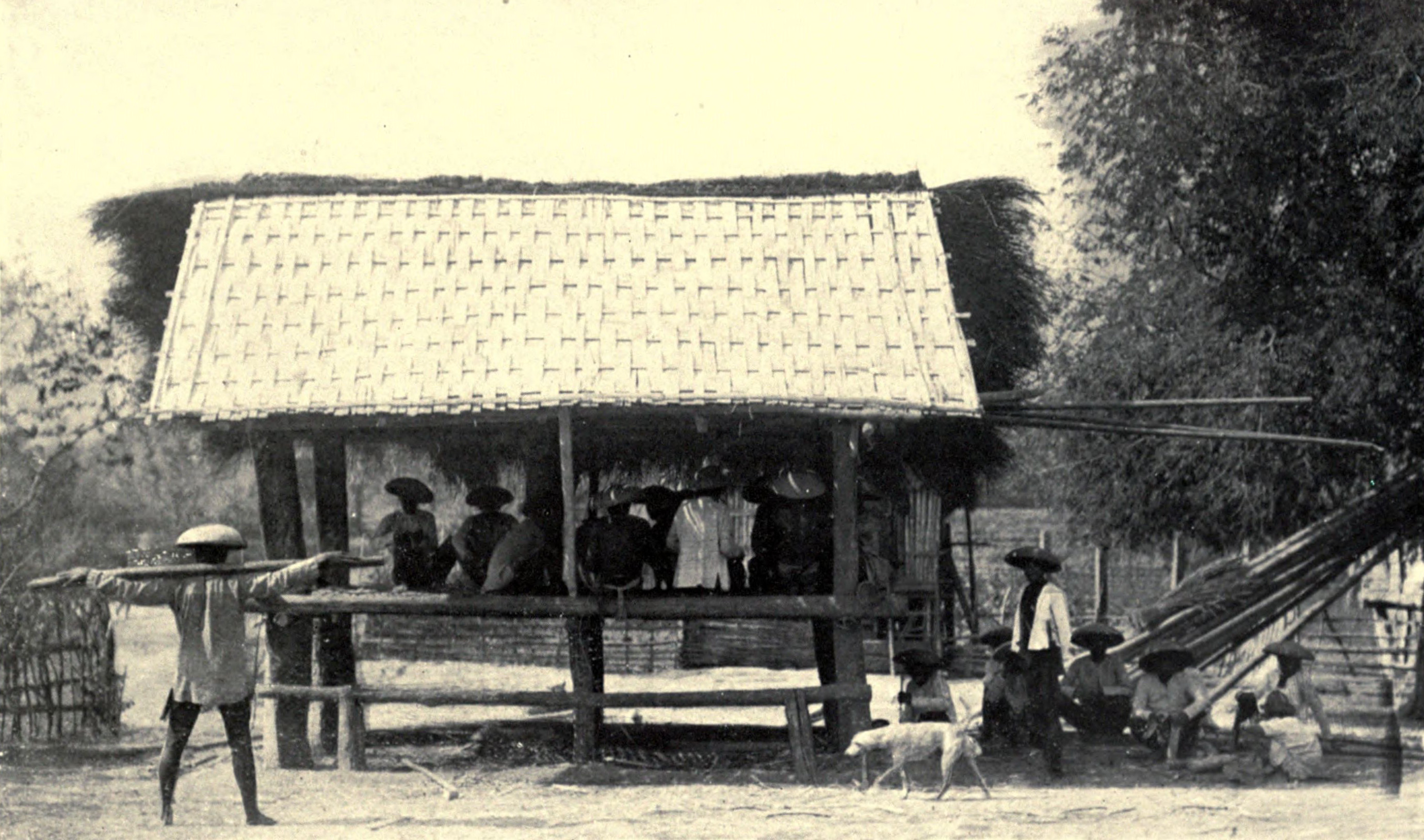
A balaua, a large spirit house used for community rituals to anito among the Itneg people (1922)

Most taotao represent an actual deceased person, usually carved by the community upon their funeral. As such, there can be hundreds of taotao in a single village, some of them centuries old.

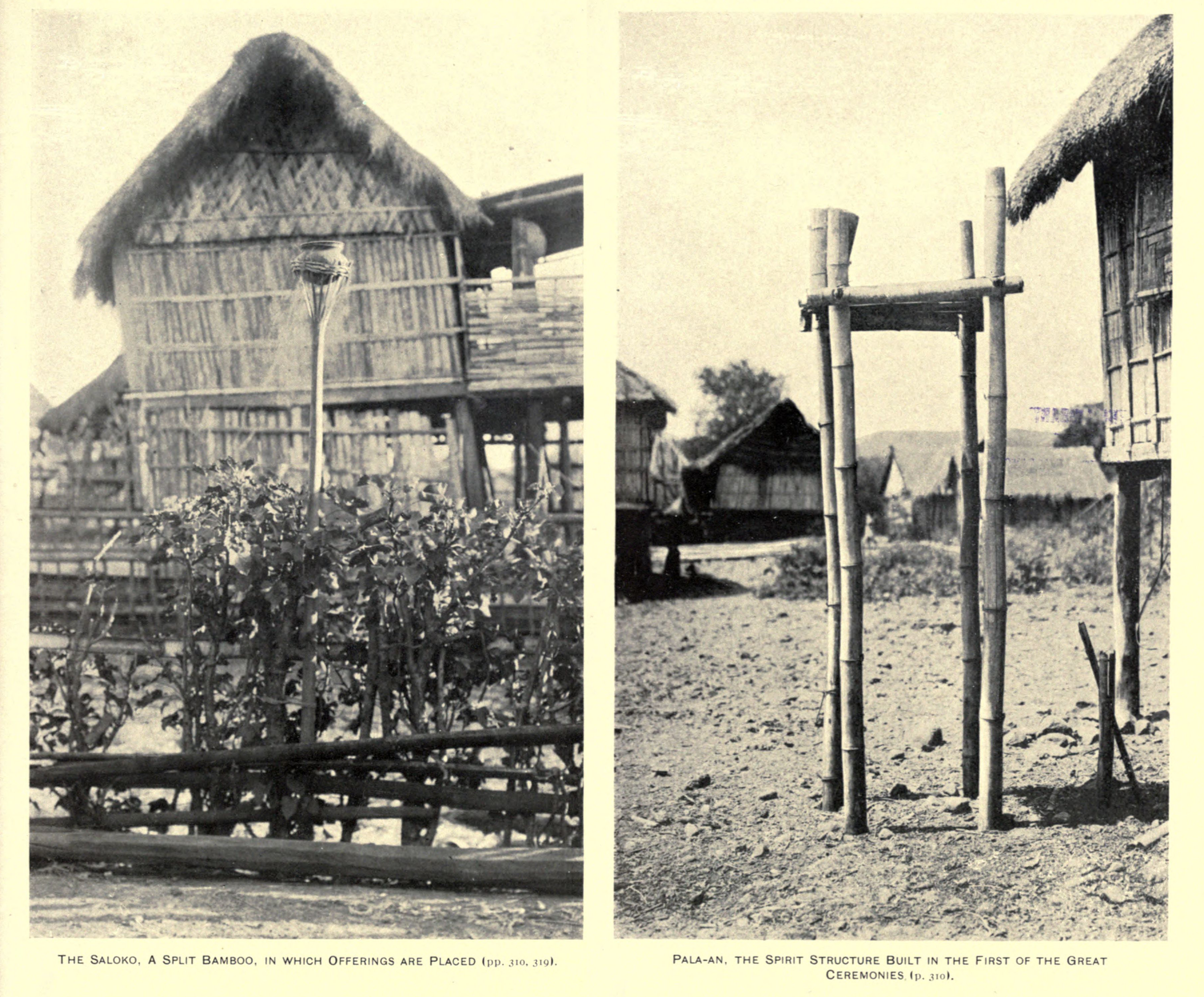
Salako (left) and palaan (right) ceremonial altars among the Itneg people (1922)

In very rare cases, diwata can be depicted as taotao in anthropomorphic form, as chimeras or legendary creatures, or as animals. These include a special class of figures called hipag among the Igorot which depict war deities, as well as kinabigat (carved houseposts) and hogang (carved tree fern posts used as boundary markers and as wards against harm). As a rule, however, diwata are not usually depicted as taotao or by any man-made representations.

Taotao were not intrinsically sacred. They were representations of the spirits, not the actual spirits themselves. They only became sacred during their use in a pag-anito ritual. Without the spirit they represent, they are treated as mundane carved pieces of wood or sculpted stone. The anonymous author of the 1572 Relación de la conquista de la isla de Luzón describes pag-anito rituals of the Tagalog people as such:

When any chief is ill, he invites his kindred and orders a great meal to be prepared, consisting of fish, meat, and wine. When the guests are all assembled and the feast set forth in a few plates on the ground inside the house, they seat themselves also on the ground to eat. In the midst of the feast (called manganito or baylán in their tongue), they put the idol called Batala and certain aged women who are considered as priestesses, and some aged Indians—neither more nor less. They offer the idol some of the food which they are eating, and call upon him in their tongue, praying to him for the health of the sick man for whom the feast is held. The natives of these islands have no altars nor temples whatsoever. This manganito, or drunken revel, to give it a better name, usually lasts seven or eight days; and when it is finished they take the idols and put them in the corners of the house, and keep them there without showing them any reverence.

Regardless, very old taotao handed down through generations are prized as family heirlooms. Among the Igorot, pieces of taotao may also be chipped off and boiled into a medicinal tea.

Taotao were commonly kept in corners or small shelves inside houses or granaries. Spanish missionaries recorded that taotao were present in every Filipino household, no matter how poor.

When Spanish missionaries arrived in the Philippines, the word "anito" came to be associated with these physical representations of spirits that featured prominently in pag-anito rituals. During the American rule of the Philippines (1898–1946), the meaning of the Spanish word idolo ("a thing worshiped") was further conflated with the English word "idol". Thus in the modern Filipino language, anito has come to refer almost exclusively to the carved taotao figures, instead of the actual spirits themselves.

=== Shrines, altars, and sacred areas ===
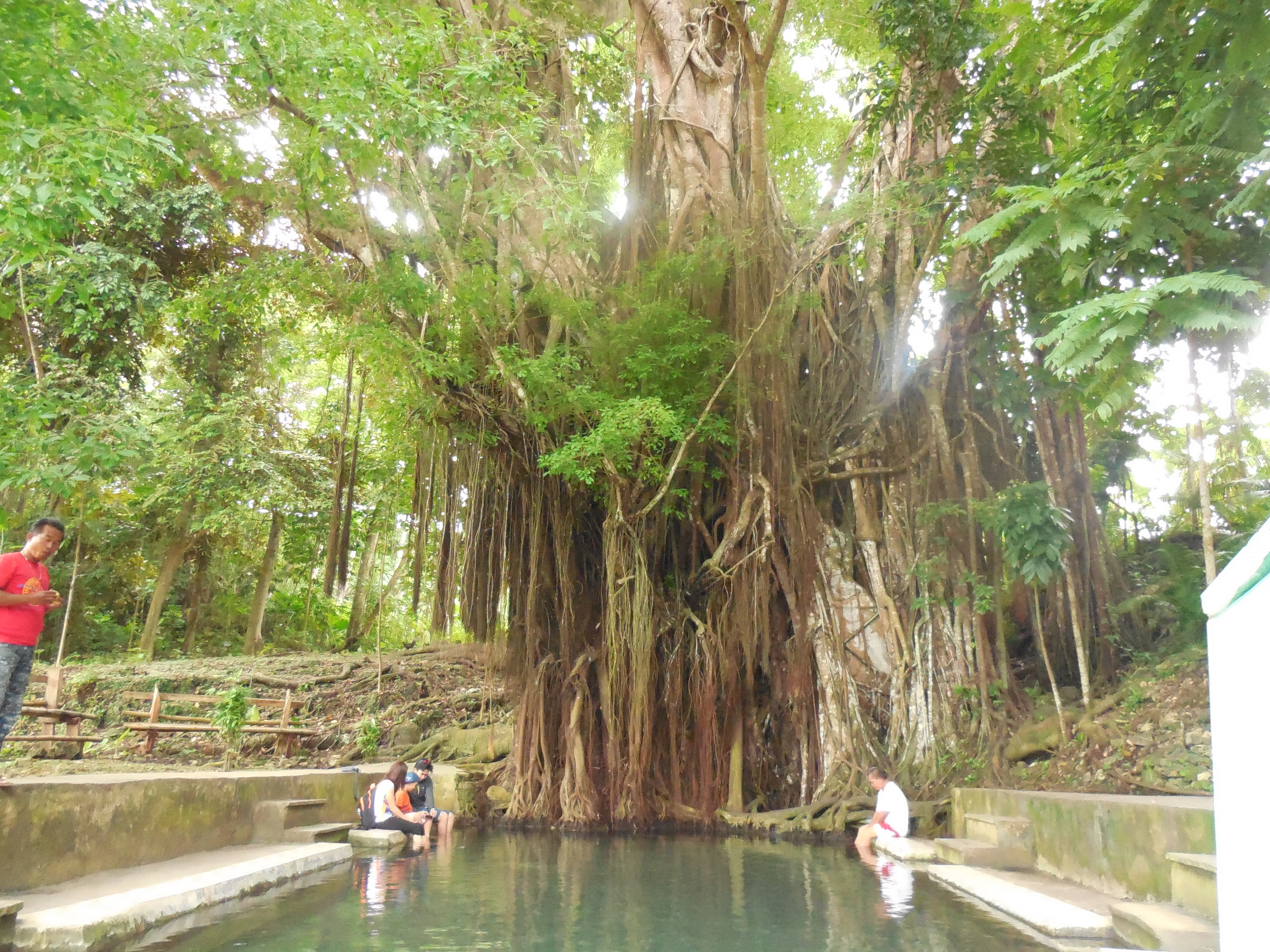
Diwata are believed to inhabit this 400-year old balete tree in Lazi, Siquijor with a natural spring between its roots

Ancient Filipinos and Filipinos who continue to adhere to the Indigenous Philippine folk religions generally do not have so-called "temples" of worship under the context known to foreign cultures. However, they do have sacred shrines, which are also called as spirit houses. They can range in size from small roofed platforms, to structures similar to a small house (but with no walls), to shrines that look similar to pagodas, especially in the south where early mosques were also modeled in the same way. These shrines were known in various indigenous terms, which depend on the ethnic group association. (Note: Known as magdantang in Visayan and ulango or simbahan in Tagalog. Among the Itneg, shrines are known tangpap, pangkew, or alalot (for various small roofed altars); and balaua or kalangan (for larger structures). In Mindanao, shrines are known among the Subanen as maligai; among the Teduray as tenin (only entered by shamans); and among the Bagobo as buis (for those built near roads and villages) and parabunnian (for those built near rice fields).(Kroeber, 1918)) They can also be used as places to store taotao and caskets of ancestors. Among Bicolanos, taotao were also kept inside sacred caves called moog.

During certain ceremonies, anito are venerated through temporary altars near sacred places. These were called latangan or lantayan in Visayan and dambana or lambana in Tagalog. (Note: Also saloko or palaan (Itneg); sakolong (Bontoc); salagnat (Bicolano); sirayangsang (Tagbanwa); ranga (Teduray); and tambara, tigyama, or balekat (Bagobo)) These bamboo or rattan altars are identical in basic construction throughout most of the Philippines. They were either small roof-less platforms or standing poles split at the tip (similar to a tiki torch). They held halved coconut shells, metal plates, or martaban jars as receptacles for offerings. Taotao may sometimes also be placed on these platforms.

Other types of sacred places or objects of worship of diwata include the material manifestation of their realms. The most widely venerated were balete trees (also called nonok, nunuk, nonoc, etc.) and anthills or termite mounds (punso). Other examples include mountains, waterfalls, tree groves, reefs, and caves.

=== Spirit animals and plants ===
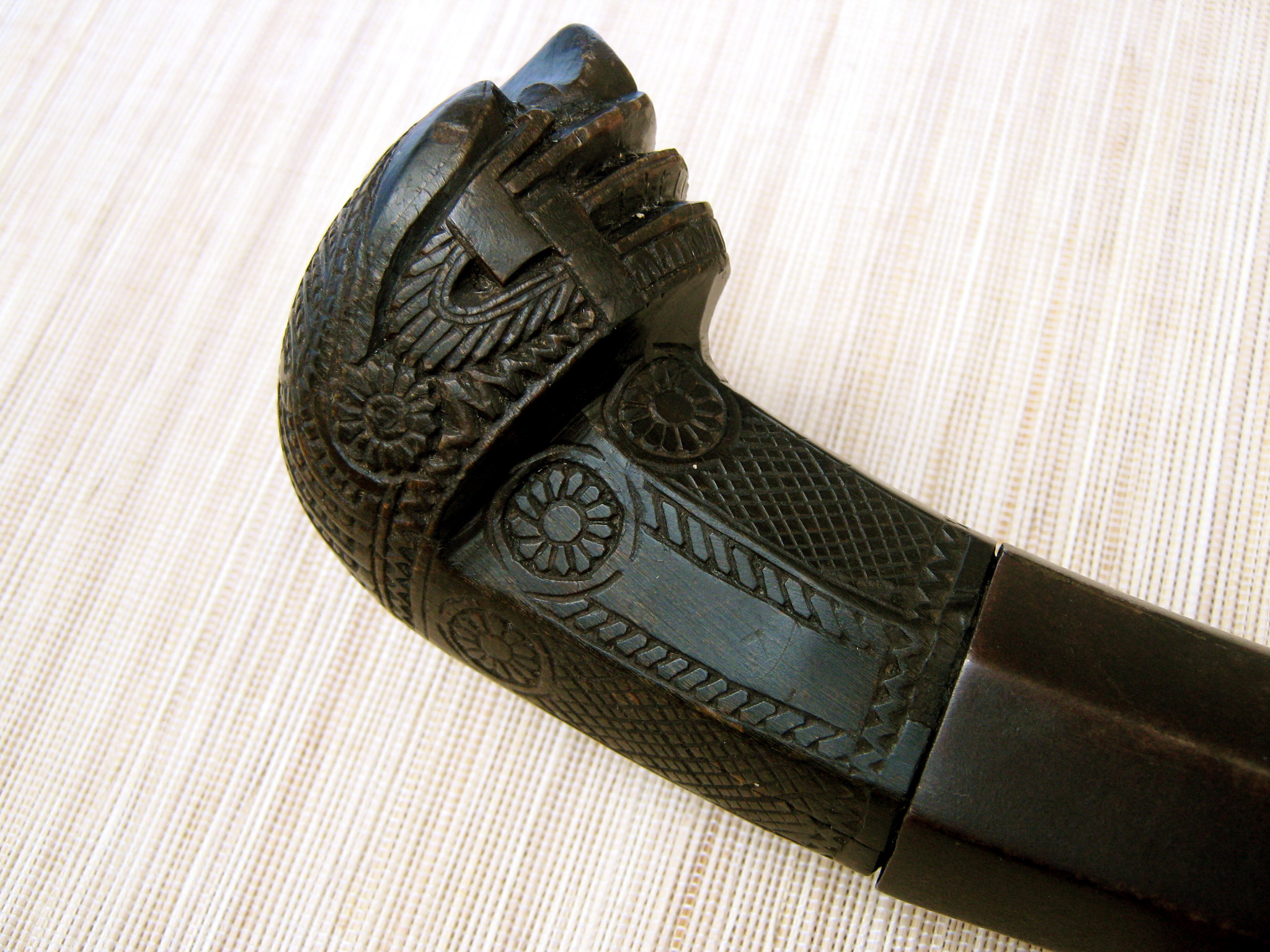
Bakunawa pommel from a Visayan tenegre sword

Some animals like crocodiles, snakes, monitor lizards, tokay geckos, and various birds were also venerated as servants or manifestations of diwata, or as powerful spirits themselves. These include legendary creatures like the dragon or serpent Bakunawa, the giant bird Minokawa of the Bagobo, and the colorful Sarimanok of the Maranao.

Omen birds were particularly important. The most common omen birds were doves with green or blue iridescent feathers called limokon (usually the common emerald dove, imperial pigeons, or brown doves). (Note: Limokon in most of Visayas and among the Lumad; also almúgan (Blaan), alimúkun (Cebuano), alimúkeng (Ilocano); limoken (Maranao); muhen (T'boli); lemuguen (Teduray); and limukun (Subanen)) Other omen birds include fairy-bluebirds (tigmamanukan, balan tikis, balatiti, or bathala among Tagalogs; and batala among Kapampangans); kingfishers (salaksak among the Ilocano, Igorot, and Sambal); and flowerpeckers (pitpit, ichaw, ido, or labeg among the Igorot).

Certain animals (in addition to omen birds) are also believed to be manifestations of spirits, and there were taboos when interacting with them or speaking about them as their connections to the spirit world make them innately dangerous. This belief was universal among early Austronesian animism, existing not only in the Philippines, but also among the Taiwanese indigenous peoples, other Islander Southeast Asians, and Pacific Islanders. When spoken of, these spirit creatures are marked with a prefix, reconstructed as proto-Austronesian *qali- or *kali-, (Note: With numerous variants in proto-Malayo-Polynesian including *buli-, *dali-, *kala-, *kali-, *kalu-, *kula-, *kuli-, *kuliN-, *kulu-, *pali-, *qali-, *qaNi-, *qari-, *quNi-, *sali-, *tali-, etc. (Blust, 2001)) which still survive fossilized in modern languages in Austronesian cultures, though the beliefs may have long been forgotten. Only very specific creatures were regarded in this way, the most prominent being butterflies which are still widely associated with ghosts. The animals in this category include the following:

- Ants, winged ants, or winged termites, e.g. Cebuano alibusbus, Pinatubo Aeta alidakdak, and Maranao kalalapa
- Aphid, e.g. Bikol alusiwsiw
- Bats, e.g. Teduray kelimbungan, Bikol kulapnit, and Kapampangan talibatab
- Beetles, e.g. Hanunóo alutatip and Teduray kelefutey
- Birds (various), examples:

- Doves, e.g. Cebuano alimukun, Tagalog kalapati, ahd Maranao limoken
- Hanging parrots, e.g. Hanunóo kalusisi and Tagalog kulasisi
- Hornbills, e.g. Teduray kelimetan
- Coucals, e.g. Hanunóo balikaku
- Owls, e.g. Ilocano kolalabang
- Roosters (especially colorful fighting cocks), e.g. Tagalog alimbuyugin and Cebuano balakiki
- Swiftlets, e.g. Ilocano kalapini, Tausug kalasiyaw and Ivatan alpasayaw
- Woodpeckers, e.g. Cebuano balalatuk and Isneg kalittaxa

- Bumblebees, e.g. Hanunóo alibúyug, Ilocano alimbubúyog, and Itawis arabiyóngen
- Butterflies and large moths, e.g. Cebuano alibangbáng, Ilocano kulibangbang, Ivatan kulivaavang, and Tagalog aliparó
- Caterpillars, e.g. Ilocano alimbobódo, Bikol alaláso
- Centipedes, e.g. Cebuano aluhipan and Ivatan alipuan
- Crabs, e.g. Tagalog alimango, Cebuano alimasag, and Ilocano arimbukéng
- Dragonflies, e.g. Kankanaey alallaóngan, Cebuano alindanaw, and Ilocano alimbubungáw
- Earthworms, e.g. Bikol aluluntí, Hanunóo alukáti, and Pangasinan alombáyar
- Fireflies, e.g. Cebuano aniníput, Tagalog alitáptap, and Ilocano kulalantí
- Fish (various), examples:

- Spadefish, e.g. Casiguran Dumagat Agta kalibongbong
- Sailfin catfish, e.g. Cebuano alimusan
- Sillago, e.g. Cebuano alasuus

- Fleas, e.g. Ibanag aliffúngo and Kankanaey atilalagá
- Gecko, e.g. Ilocano alutíit and Kapampangan lupísak
- Grasshoppers, e.g. Cebuano alisiwsiw, Sangir kalimbotong, and Maranao karakeban
- Stingless bees, e.g. Cebuano ligwán, Hanunóo alibúbug, and Kapampangan anig-guan
- Leeches

- Land leech, e.g. Cebuano alimátuk, Tagalog limátik, and Ilocano alimátek
- Paddy (aquatic) leeches, e.g. Ilocano alintá, Tagalog lintá, and Isneg alimtá

- Snakes, e.g. Tagalog alimuranin, Bikol alibusógon, Ilocano alindáyag, and Isneg arimarán
- Mollusks

- Limpets, e.g. Cebuano alipadnu
- Windowpane oyster, e.g. Ilocano kulintipay

- Spiders, e.g. Aklanon talimbabága, Isinai alingakáwa, Sangir kalibangkang, and Sarangani Blaan kalmamo
- Wasps, e.g. Ilocano alumpinig and Cebuano lampining

The category also includes numerous plants, many of which are or were used in shamanic or medicinal applications, including Lepisanthes rubiginosa (Tagalog kalimayo), Ticanto crista (Tagalog kalumbibit), Tabernaemontana pandacaqui (Aklanon alibutbut), Excoecaria agallocha (Aklanon alipata), Musa acuminata (Tagalog alinsanay), Diospyros pilosanthera (Tagalog alintataw), Basella rubra (Tagalog alugbati), and nettles (Hanunóo alingatngat and Isneg alalatang), among many others.

The prefix also extended to terms for actual spirits, like Tagalog kaluluwa ("soul"), Isneg Kalapataw (a totemic spirit of birds), Kankanaey aladunáxan (a spirit who makes babies cry at night to disturb their parents' sleep), and Maranao alimekat (a water spirit); as well as natural phenomena and other concepts believed to have direct ties to the spirit world, like echoes (e.g. Tagalog alingawngaw), whirlpools or tornadoes (e.g. Tagalog alimpuyó and Bikol alipúros), storms (e.g. Kankanaey alimbudádbud), shadows (e.g. Kankanaey alalangaw), [clouds of] dust (e.g. Tagalog alikabok and Western Bukidnon Manobo eliyavuk), sun or moon halos (e.g. Isneg alibongbóng), unease or restlessness (e.g. Tagalog alisuwag), rustling of the grass or wind (e.g. Ilocano aringgunay and Kankanaey alikadong), hair whorls (e.g. Cebuano alimpulu and Hanunóo aripudwan), mountain summits (e.g. Bikol alituktok and Aklanon alipungto), dizziness or fainting (e.g. Cebuano alipulung, Pangasinan alimoreng, and Kankanaey alitengteng), confusion or forgetting (e.g. Kapampangan kalingwan and Bikol aliwalas), thick smoke or steam (e.g. Ilocano alingasaw and Tagalog alimuóm), loud [annoying] noises (e.g. Cebuano alingasaw and Ifugao alidogdog), the pupil of the eye (e.g. Tagalog alikmata and Hiligaynon kalimutaw), and so on.

== Rituals and shamans ==
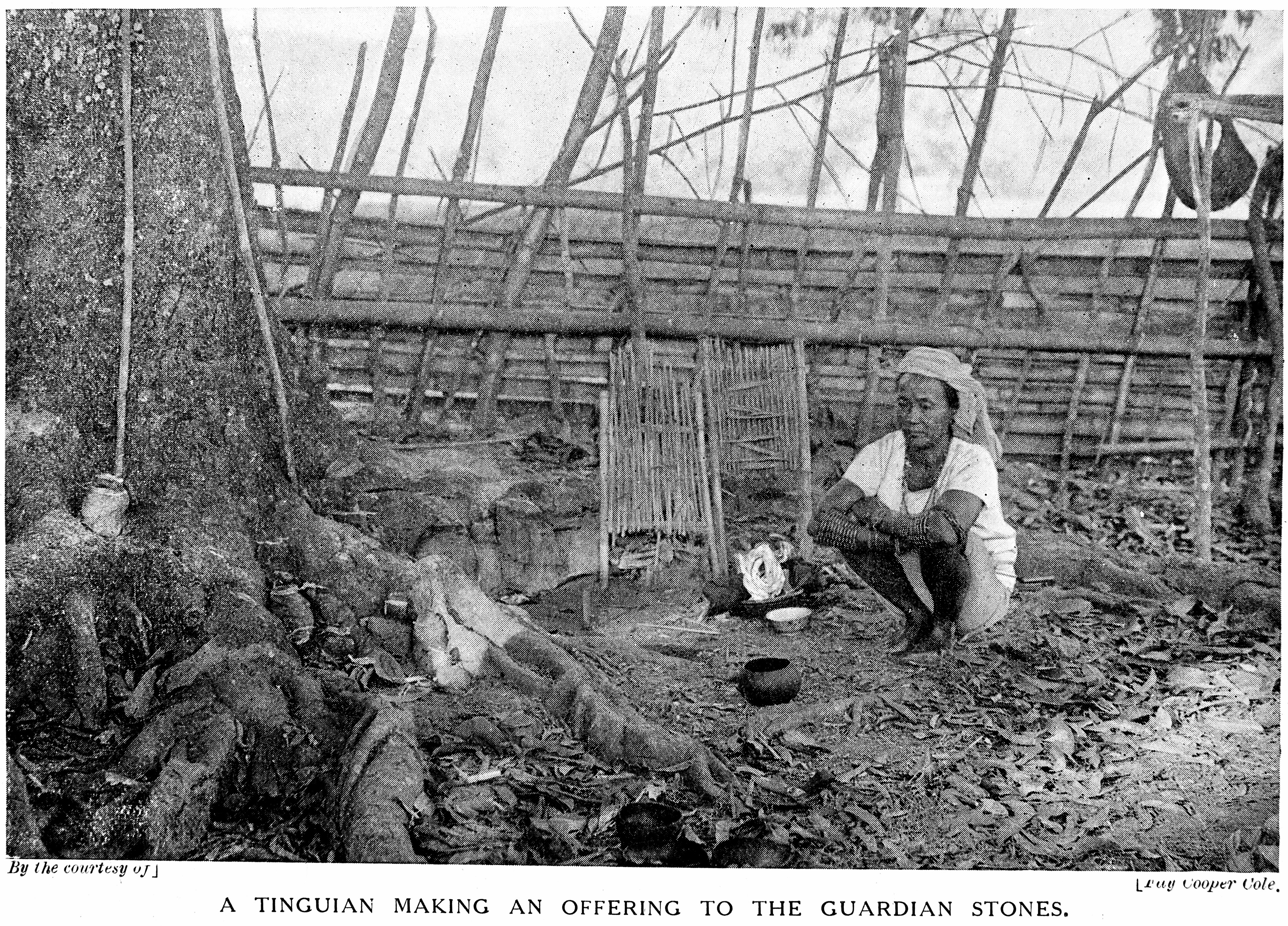
A 1922 photograph of an Itneg shaman making an offering to an apdel, a guardian anito of her village. Apdel are believed to reside in the water-worn stones known as pinaing.

Anitism was not a religion about worship. Aside from good ancestor spirits and the few benevolent diwata, most anito were feared, not venerated. To an ordinary person, diwata were regarded as dangerous beings to be avoided or appeased. When interaction was necessary, they performed a ritual known as pag-anito (also mag-anito or anitohan). These are usually directed at ancestor spirits. When the pag-anito ceremony is for a diwata, the ritual is known as pagdiwata (also magdiwata or diwatahan).

Minor pag-anito rituals like praying for better weather or banishing minor ill luck can be performed by any householder. However, major pag-anito rituals required the services of the community shaman (Visayan babaylan or baylan; Tagalog katalonan or manganito). (Note: Other terms include balyana, paraanito, or paradiwata (Bicolano); balian, balyan, or mabalian (Lumad); balian or tanguilin (Subanen); bawalyan or babaylan (Tagbanwa); beljan (Palaw'an); baglan, mangoodan, or manilao (Ilocano);bahasa (Yakan); dukun, kalamat, or papagan (Sama-Bajau); mandadawak, dawak, insupak, mon-lapu, tumunoh, alpogan, or mumbaki (Igorot); anitu (Aeta); and ma-aram (Karay-a))

These shamans were believed to have been "chosen" by a specific diwata who become their spirit guides. (Note: Terms for spirit guides of shamans include bantay, abyan (Visayan); alagad, gabay (Tagalog); abyan, umli, sugujen, or inajew (Lumad); saro (Bicolano); and jinn (Sama-Bajau)) This was presumed to happen after they pass the initiation rites of an older shaman they were apprenticed to (usually a relative). In some cases, some shamans acquire their status after they recover from a serious illness or a bout of insanity. In most Filipino ethnic groups, shamans were almost always female. The few males who gain shaman status were usually asog or bayok, (Note: Asog is the term used for transvestite male shamans in most of the Visayas and in the Bicol Region. In the rest of Luzon, they are known as bayok (bayoc), bayog, or bayogin (bayoguin or bayoquin). Notably among the Sambal, the highest-ranking shaman was a bayok. They are also known as labia among the Subanen, though they were not necessarily shamans (Kroeber, 1918). There are also similar trans women shamans among the Dayak people of Borneo (Baldick, 2013). Also see Bakla) feminized men.

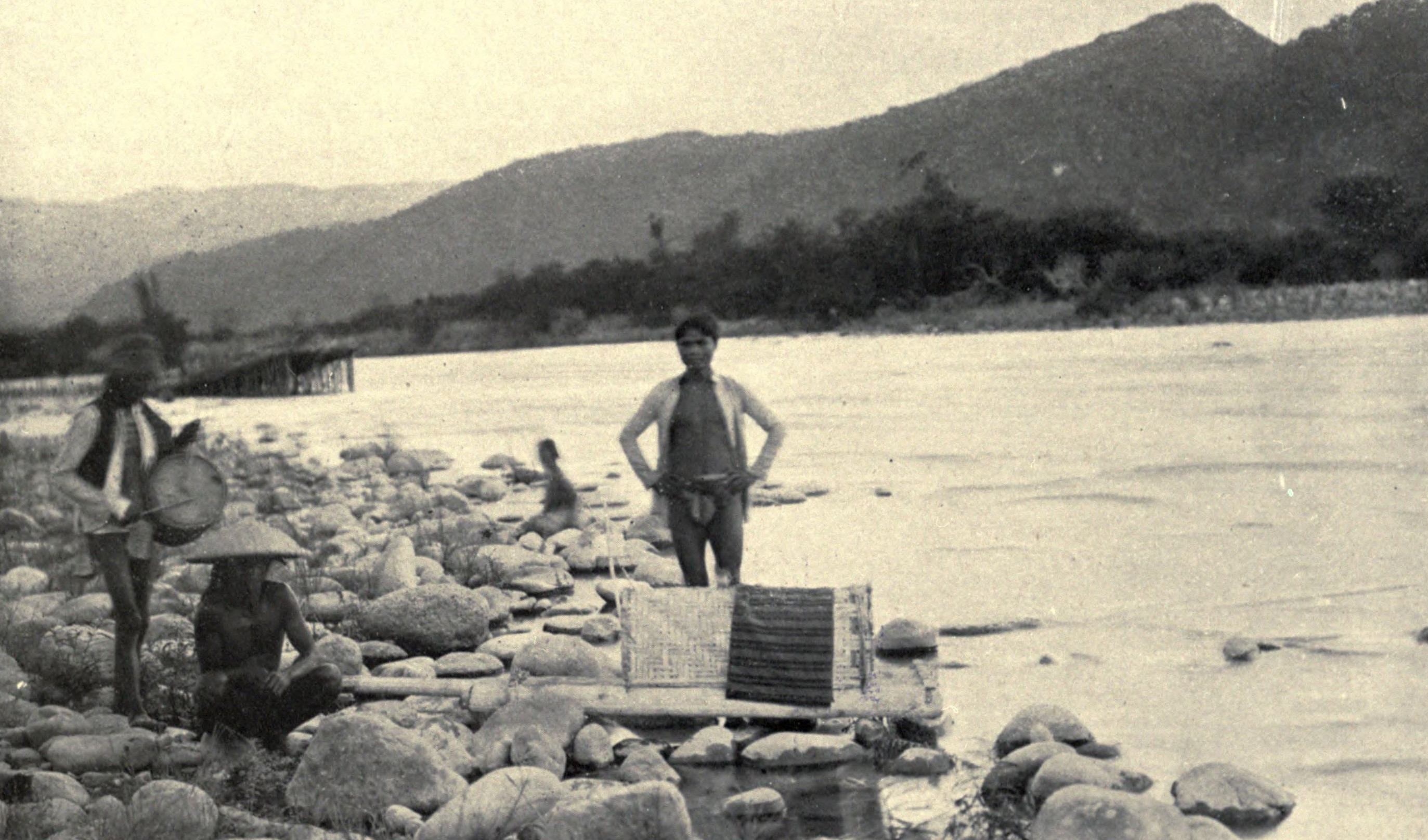
Itneg people launching spirit boats (taltalabong) bearing offerings for anito (1922)

Major pag-anito rituals are centered around a séance. Because of their special relationship with their companion spirits, shamans can act as mediums for other anito, allowing spirits to temporarily possess their bodies. This possession happens after the shaman goes into a trance-like state. This allows the spirit to communicate verbally with the participants as well as physically act out events in the spirit world. At the moment of possession, shamans display a change in behavior and voice. They can sometimes go into seizures and become violent enough that restraints are required. The ritual ends when the spirit leaves and the shaman is awakened.

Spirits were invited into the ritual through offerings and sacrifices during and after the ceremonies. These depended on what spirit was being summoned, but offerings are usually a small portion of the harvests, cooked food, wine, gold ornaments, and betel nut. Blood from an animal was also usually part of the offerings, poured directly on the taotao or in a bowl before them. These commonly come from chickens or pigs, but can also be from carabaos or dogs. Salt and spices are usually avoided, as they are believed to be distasteful to anito.

Colonial records of human sacrifice indicate that it was also widely practiced on special occasions (like prior to battle, sowing time, illness, or building houses). These practices largely died out during the colonial era, but it persisted among the Bagobo people in southern Mindanao where it was prevalent until the early 20th century. Some anthropologists consider the headhunting traditions of the Igorot as a form of human sacrifice. In the funeral rites for celebrated warriors or nobles among Visayans and Tagalogs, favorite slaves may also sometimes be executed and buried (hogot) to accompany the deceased into the spirit world.

Another common pag-anito ritual throughout most of the Philippine ethnic groups involves the use of spirit boats. These were usually miniature boats laden with offerings set adrift from riverbanks and shorelines.

Pag-anito can be conducted on its own or in conjunction with other rituals and celebrations. They can be personal or family rituals or seasonal community events. They can vary considerably between different ethnic groups. The most common pag-anito were entreaties for bountiful harvests, cures for illnesses, victory in battle, prayers for the dead, or blessings.

Different ethnic groups had different diwata pantheons and rituals associated with them, though sometimes deities are shared in neighboring ethnic groups. Moreover, different communities also each have their own local patron diwata. (Note: In modern Christianized Filipinos, this practice was transferred unto community patron saints and religious icons, which are often celebrated and worshiped in a very similar way (Hislop, 1971), cf. Ati-Atihan, Obando Fertility Rites)

== Historical accounts ==
Historical accounts of anito in Spanish records include the following:

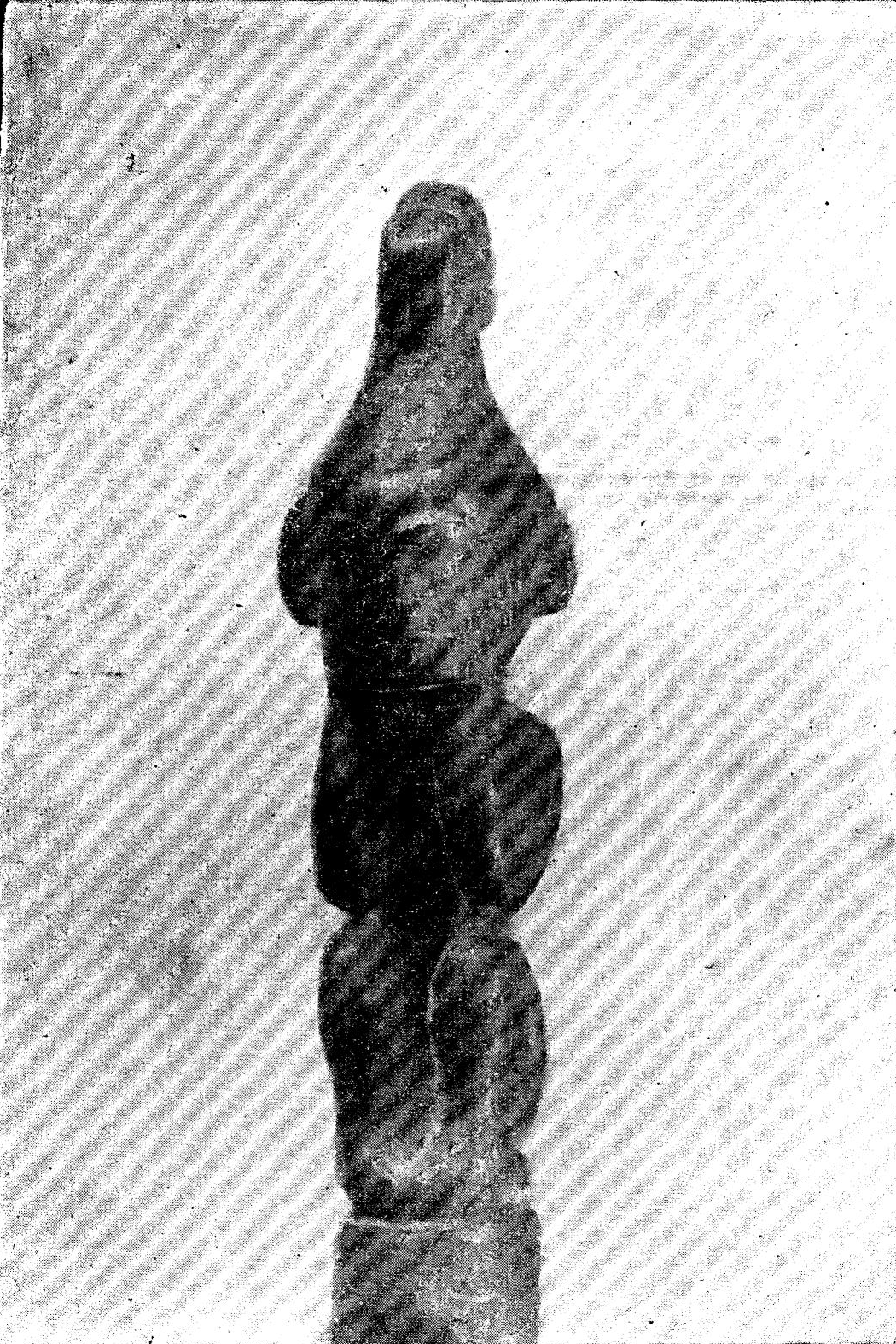
A figurine of Lumawig, a cultural hero and the supreme being in the pantheon of the Bontoc people

- "Most of the Indians are heathens...They believe in their ancestors, and when about to embark upon some enterprise commend themselves to these, asking them for aid." – Francisco de Sande, Relacion de las Yslas Filipinas (1576)
- "Which treats of the rites and ceremonies observed by the Moros in the vicinity of Manilla, and of their social conditions. The god Batala. According to the religion formerly observed by these Moros, they worshiped a deity called among them Batala, which properly means “God.” They said that they adored this Batala because he was the Lord of all, and had created human beings and villages. They said that this Batala had many agents under him, whom he sent to this world to produce, in behalf of men, what is yielded here. These beings were called anitos, and each anito had a special office. Some of them were for the fields, and some for those who journey by sea; some for those who went to war, and some for diseases. Each anito was therefore named for his office; there was, for instance, the anito of the fields, and the anito of the rain. To these anitos the people offered sacrifices, when they desired anything—to each one according to his office. The mode of sacrifice was like that of the Pintados. They summoned a catalonan, which is the same as the vaylan among the Pintados, that is, a priest. He offered the sacrifice, requesting from the anito whatever the people desired him to ask, and heaping up great quantities of rice, meat, and fish. His invocations lasted until the demon entered his body, when the catalonan fell into a swoon, foaming at the mouth. The Indians sang, drank, and feasted until the catalonan came to himself, and told them the answer that the anito had given to him. If the sacrifice was in behalf of a sick person, they offered many golden chains and ornaments, saying that they were paying a ransom for the sick person's health. This invocation of the anito continued as long as the sickness lasted."

"When the natives were asked why the sacrifices were offered to the anito, and not to the Batala, they answered that the Batala was a great lord, and no one could speak to him. He lived in the sky; but the anito, who was of such a nature that he came down here to talk with men, was to the Batala as a minister, and interceded for them. In some places and especially in the mountain districts, when the father, mother, or other relative dies, the people unite in making a small wooden idol, and preserve it. Accordingly there is a house which contains one hundred or two hundred of these idols. These images also are called anitos; for they say that when people die, they go to serve the Batala. Therefore they make sacrifices to these anitos, offering them food, wine, and gold ornaments; and request them to be intercessors for them before the Batala, whom they regard as God." – Miguel de Loarca, Relacion de las Yslas Filipinas (1582)

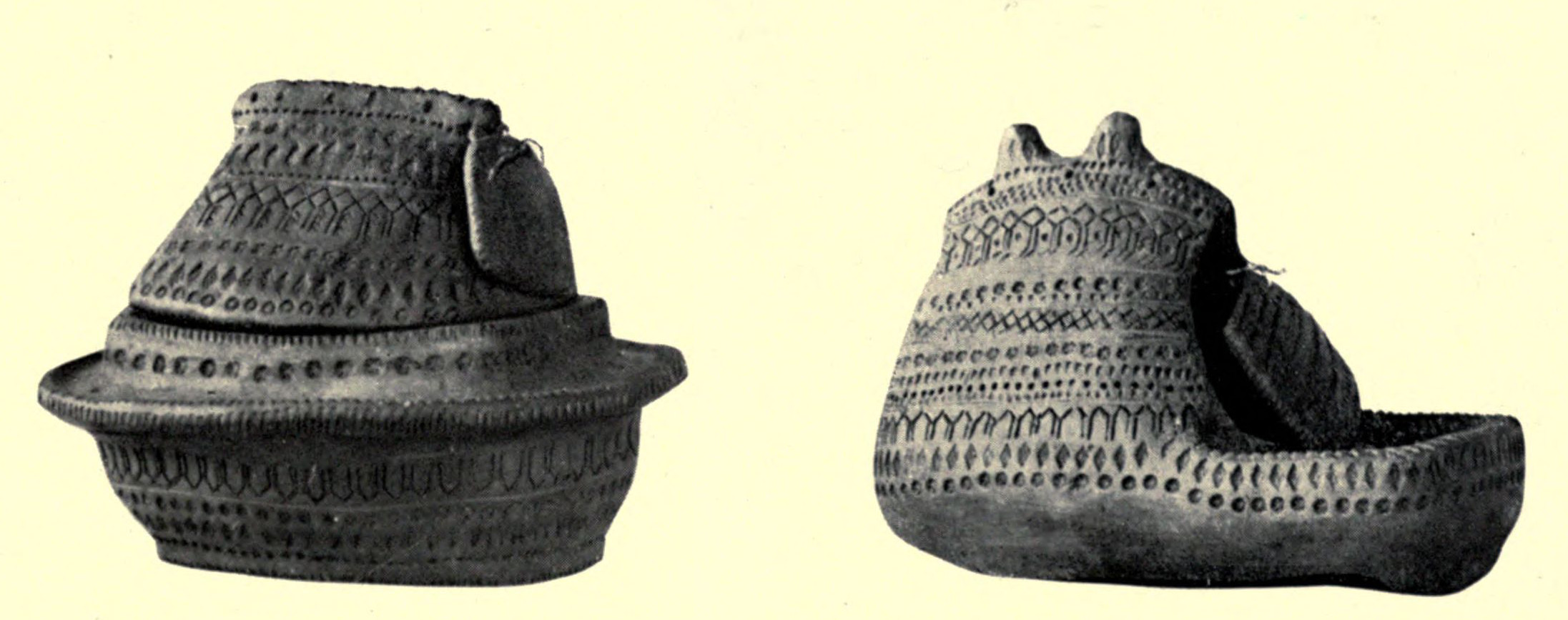
Small ornate pottery houses used as offerings for rice anito among the Itneg people

- "They held the cayman in the utmost veneration; and, whenever they made any statement about it, when they descried it in the water, they called it Nono, which means "grandfather." They softly and tenderly besought it not to harm them; and to this end offered it a part of what they carried in their boats, casting the offering into the water. There was no old tree to which they did not attribute divinity; and it was a sacrilege to cut such a tree for any purpose. What more did they adore? the very stones, cliffs, and reefs, and the headlands of the shores of the sea or the rivers; and they made some offering when they passed by these, going to the stone or rock, and placing the offering upon it. I saw many times in the river of Manila a rock which for many years was an idol of that wretched people... While sailing along the island of Panai I beheld on the promontory called Nasso, near Potol, plates and other pieces of earthenware, laid upon a rock, the offering of voyagers. In the island of Mindanao between La Canela and the river [i.e., Rio Grande], a great promontory projects from a rugged and steep coast; always at these points there is a heavy sea, making it both difficult and dangerous to double them. When passing by this headland, the natives, as it was so steep, offered their arrows, discharging them with such force that they penetrated the rock itself. This they did as a sacrifice, that a safe passage might be accorded them." – Fr. Pedro Chirino, Relacion de las Islas Filipinas (1604)
- "They also adored private idols, which each one inherited from his ancestors. The Visayans called them divata, and the Tagálogs anito. Of those idols some had jurisdiction over the mountains and open country, and permission was asked from them to go thither. Others had jurisdiction over the sowed fields, and the fields were commended to them so that they might prove fruitful; and besides the sacrifices they placed articles of food in the fields for the anitos to eat, in order to place them under greater obligations. There was an anito of the sea, to whom they commended their fisheries and navigations; an anito of the house, whose favor they implored whenever an infant was born, and when it was suckled and the breast offered to it. They placed their ancestors, the invocation of whom was the first thing in all their work and dangers, among these anitos. In memory of their ancestors they kept certain very small and very badly made idols of stone, wood, gold, or ivory, called licha or laravan. Among their gods they reckoned also all those who perished by the sword, or who were devoured by crocodiles, as well as those killed by lightning. They thought that the souls of such immediately ascended to the blest abode by means of the rainbow, called by them balañgao. Generally, whoever could succeed in it attributed divinity to his aged father at his death. The aged themselves died in that presumptuous delusion, and during their sickness and at their death guided all their actions with what they imagined a divine gravity and manner. Consequently, they chose as the place for their grave some assigned spot, like one old man who lived on the seacoast between Dulac and Abuyog, which is in the island of Leyte. He ordered himself placed there in his coffin (as was done) in a house standing alone and distant from the settlement, in order that he might be recognized as a god of navigators, who were to commend themselves to him. Another had himself buried in certain lands in the mountains of Antipolo, and through reverence to him no one dared to cultivate those lands (for they feared that he who should do so would die), until an evangelical minister removed that fear from them, and now they cultivate them without harm or fear." – Fr. Francisco Colin, Labor Evangelica (1663)

== In popular culture ==
=== Arts ===
==== Film and television ====
- Amaya, a historical television series about the precolonial Philippines. It depicts diwata as goddesses.
- Sugo, is a Philippine television drama action fantasy series features anitos as evil ancestors and demi gods
- Super Ma'am (international title: My Teacher, My Hero) is a Philippine television drama action fantasy series features a diwata once a goddess demoted as a fairy and as a spirit guide for the lead hero
- Juan dela Cruz (TV series) depicts the anito as an evil deity and the diwatas as good fairies
- Diwata (1987), a movie directed by Tata Esteban and written by Rei Nicandro showed the mythical life of the deities. Actress Olga Miranda played the main role, together with the other cast Lala Montelibano, Dick Israel and George Estregan.
- Halimaw sa Banga (1986), a horror movie based from comic book series of the same name features a shaman killed in a ritual and placed in a jar that later turned into an evil anito that kills people
- Encantadia and Mulawin, two television series (with film adaptations) in a shared universe depicts diwatas as a race of fairies and supernatural being living in Encantadia, a dimension beyond the human world.
- Faraway (2014), an independent film focuses on a woman and her quest to find the Diwata tribe.
- Indio, a television series with a protagonist that is the son of a mortal man and a diwata woman.
- Okay Ka, Fairy Ko!, a television fantasy situational comedy series (with film adaptations) that revolves around a mortal man married to a fairy princess a diwata.
- One day Isang araw, a fantasy anthology series features an episode titled Ang huling diwata (The last Fairy) features a goddess turned fairy who is the guardian of a pond
- Elemento, television docudrama horror anthology series features a diwata of a river cursed for falling in love with a mortal man
- Wansapanataym, television fantasy anthology series episode titled Enchanted Trees features diwatas as both fairies and guardian deities of trees

==== Literature ====
- One of the main characters from the play Speech & Debate written by Stephen Karam is a woman with Filipino ancestry named Diwata.
- Marvel Comics has introduced the "Diwatas" as a pantheon of gods similar to the Asgardians and Olympians. These Diwatas include Aman Sinaya, Amihan, Anitun, Apo Laki, Aswang, Bathala, Mayari and Tala.

==== Music ====
- "Diwata", a song released by rapper Abra featuring Parokya Ni Edgar vocalist Chito Miranda, from his self-titled debut album.

==== Sculpture ====
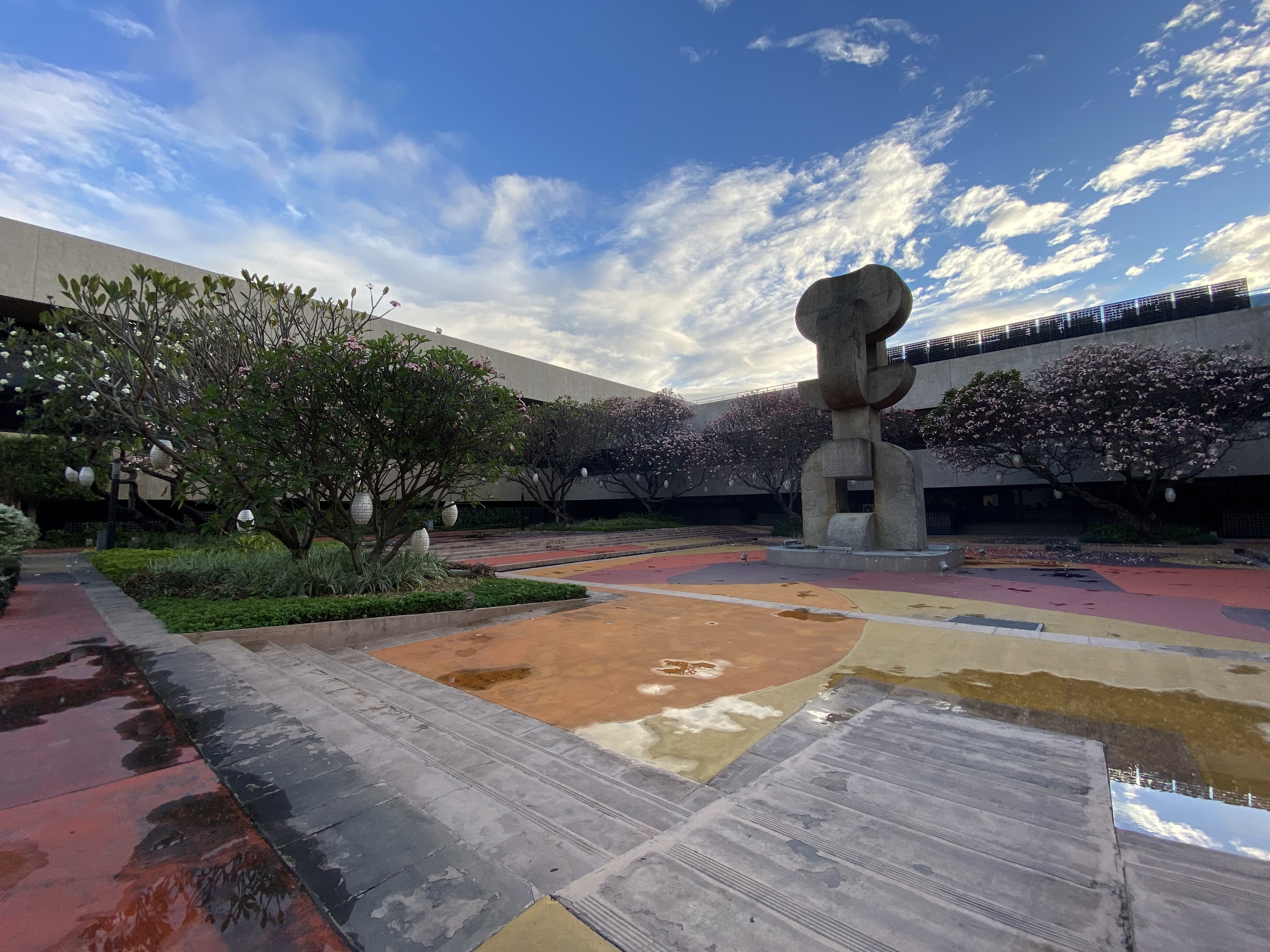
One of the Anito sculptures and public art installations by Philippine National Artist Arturo Luz at The Courtyard of the Philippine International Convention Center

- The Anito series of sculptures and public art installations by Philippine National Artist Arturo Luz was inspired by taotao carvings of anito

=== Festivals ===
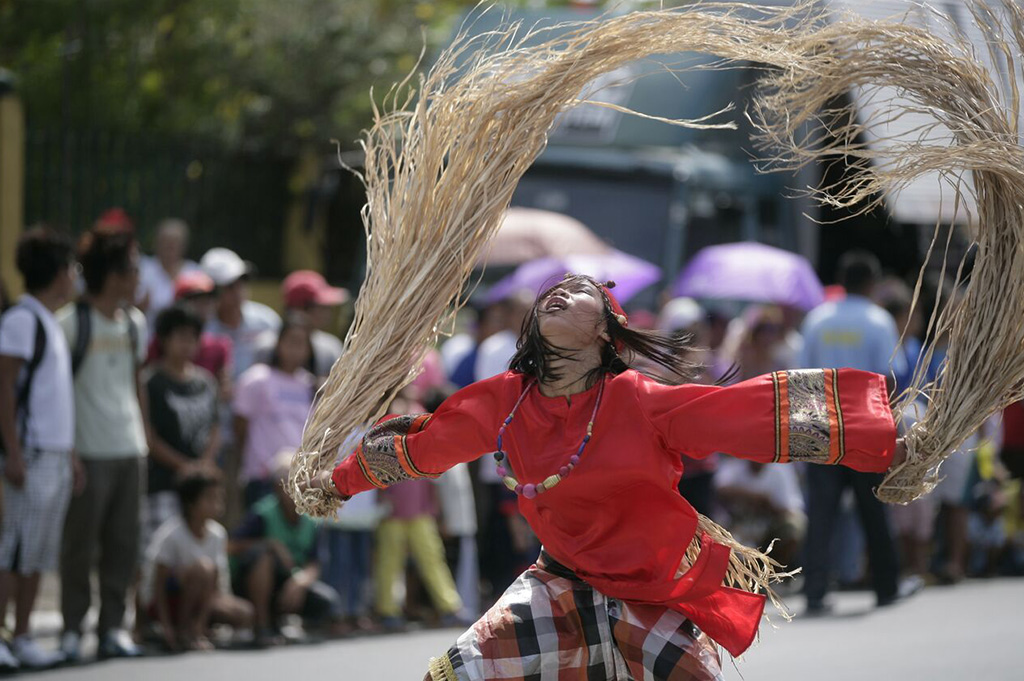
A performer depicting a shaman in the 2015 Babaylan Festival of Bago, Negros Occidental

- The Babaylan Festival of Bago, Negros O is a street dancing festival celebrating the Visayan traditions of anito and shamans
- The Kamarikutan Pagdiwata Arts Festival of Puerto Princesa is inspired by the preserved ritual of pagdiwata among the Tagbanwa people of Palawan.

=== Games ===
- Anito: Defend a Land Enraged is a role-playing game released in 2003 by Anino Entertainment. It was the first video game to be produced and designed entirely by a team of Filipino game developers, and is credited for helping spawn the birth of the game development industry in the Philippines.
- One of the abilities of the character Titania (added on August 19, 2016) in Warframe is a sword known as diwata.
- Project Tadhana, a tabletop role-playing game released in 2017 features Diwata as one of its playable races (or lahi) together with Engkanto, Tikbalang, Aswang, and Tao.
- Makia:Tales of the Forest, a visual novel released in 2020

=== Science ===
- Diwata-1 and Diwata-2, the first Philippine microsatellites launched in 2016 and 2018, respectively, were named after diwata.

== See also ==
- Atua – the Polynesian derivative belief of Anito
- fairy
- Daemon (classical mythology)
- Gabâ
- Genius loci
- Hantu
- Hyang
- Kaharingan
- Kami
- Kodama
- Kupua
- Menehune
- Moai
- Nuku-mai-tore
- Patupaiarehe
- Philippine mythology
- Soul dualism
- Taotao Mona
- Tiki
- Toraja
- Yōkai
- Yorishiro
