= Batak language (Philippines) =

Austronesian language spoken in the Philippines

Batak
- Palawan Batak
- Native to: Philippines
- Region: Palawan
- Ethnicity: 2,040 (1990 census)
- Native speakers: (200 cited 2000)
- Language family: Austronesian: Malayo-Polynesian; Philippine; Greater Central Philippine; Palawanic; Batak
- Writing system: Tagbanwa script

Language codes
- ISO 639-3: bya
- Glottolog: bata1301
- ELP: Batak

Batak is an Austronesian language spoken by the Batak people on Palawan Island in the Philippines. It is sometimes disambiguated from the Batak languages as Palawan Batak.

Batak is spoken in the communities of Babuyan, Maoyon, Tanabag, Langogan, Tagnipa, Caramay, and Buayan. Surrounding languages include Southern Tagbanwa, Central Tagbanwa, Kuyonon, and Agutaynen.

== Phonology ==
Consonants
		Labial	Alveolar	Palatal	Velar	Glottal
Plosive	voiceless	p	t		k	ʔ
Plosive	voiced	b	d		ɡ	
Nasal		m	n		ŋ	
Fricative			s			
Lateral			l			
Rhotic			ɾ~r			
Approximant		w		j		

Vowels
	Front	Central	Back
Close	i	ɨ	u
Open		a	

== Pronouns ==
Personal pronouns
	nominative	genitive		oblique
	nominative	enclitic	preposed	oblique
1.sg.	aku	ku	akɨn	kanakɨn
2.sg.	ikaw/ka	mu	imu	kanimu
3.sg.	kanya	ya	kanya	kanya
1.pl.dual	kita/ta	ta	atɨn	kanatɨn
1.pl.incl.	tami	tami	atɨn	kanatɨn
1.pl.excl.	kami	men	amɨn	kanamɨn
2.pl.	kamu	mi	imyu	kanimyu
3.pl.	sira	sira	sira	kanira
