= Kawas (mythology) =

Amis supernatural entity

Kawas are supernatural entities in the Amis faith. Though the Amis have converted to Christianity, their spiritual beliefs and Christianity have syncretized and the term kawas is still used.

Kawas are divided into six groups: gods, ancestors, souls of living, spirits of living things, spirits of lifeless objects, and ghosts and mysterious beings, giving their blessing or calamities to mortals according to myths about them . Bamboo oracle specialists were among communicators. Lisin, or ceremony, was the preferred method to cope with kawas.

Kawas is a root word used to describe a spiritual practitioner, healer, or shaman in the Amis culture.

== Meaning and function ==
The concept of spiritual healers has long been a part of many cultures, including the Amis people. This includes the belief in a great and powerful creator, Kakrayan, who is responsible for all that exists and regulates the world according to his will. Kawas are believed to be capable of seeing into both the past and the future.

It is believed that Kawas are messengers of Kakrayan or God, the Almighty and creator of everything, and regulate the world in accord with Kakrayan's will. They have the power to see into the past and future and are said to regulate the world according to Kakrayan's plan. Kawasan refers to something mysterious and may have had a deeper meaning as a dwelling place for kawas. Kawas is a set of spiritual beliefs and may be considered to be a religion, a set of beliefs and practices.

== See also ==
- Hanitu, the Bunun term for spirit.
