= Hanitu =

Taiwanese spirit

In the culture of the Bunun of Taiwan, a hanitu or qanitu is a spirit. The concept does not exactly equate with similar myths from other cultures.

The hanitu is one of three domains of Bunun spiritual thought, another being isang, which equates more to the soul, breath, and heart. It may refer to the spirit of any living creature as well as forms animate or not, such as land, rocks, plants, animals, and humans. All objects contained hanitu. In Malay and Indonesian, the term for ghost, hantu, may be of related origin.

In contrast to other religions and belief systems, multiple spirits can exist in one object/creature, as in the case of humans. They believed bad souls brought illness. With the adoption of Christianity these terms changed, with makuang being equated to devil. Nevertheless, some scholars believe the native concepts were not replaced, but rather Christian thought was added on. Strength of hanitu were innate.

== Etymology ==
Hanitu or hanidu is derived from Proto-Austronesian *qaNiCu ("ghost", "spirit of the dead"). In other Austronesian cultures, cognates of hanitu include the Filipino and Tao anito, Malaysian and Indonesian hantu or antu, Polynesian aitu and aitu, and Micronesian aniti.

== Types of hanitu ==
- Left or right spirits of people.
- Wandering spirits
- Spirits of land and objects that predated humans
- Ancestral spirits
- Agitator spirits

=== Land hanitu ===
The land contained spirits before human habitation, and governed hunting, agriculture, and inhabitation. There were human spirit mediums who communicated with these formless hanitu.

=== Hanitu of objects ===
Objects, such as guns, had formless hanitu. The hanitu of such objects were 'invited' by ritual to take lives of animals and people. It was believed a person could not force a gun to take a life, that it was the work of the hanitu of the gun. If the killing was not intentional, the shooter was not seen as guilty, rather the gun itself was evil, and would be buried.

=== Of people ===
Human hanitu came from the father. There was a formless hanitu on each shoulder, as well as an isang or soul in the middle of the chest. The isang was unrelated to the parents. The Bunun believed that each person had two spirits, one good/amicable/communal (masial) one bad/irritable/self-serving (makuang), but the ultimate arbiter was the isang/soul, which grew stronger with maturity and taboo observance. These would leave after death, could act independently of the person's will, and could cause conflict or indecisiveness. The hanitu left the body during dreams and could communicate with other hanitu during dreams (incl. objects).

=== Of ancestors ===
Hanitu of ancestors depended upon how descendants treated them during life. Violent death could cause wandering spirits. These hanitu were fed but not worshiped.

=== No abode spirits ===
Hanitu with no set abode were malevolent spirits that have specific forms, and could produce objects such as bamboo needles to stab people and cause disease, or scare out the soul (isang) from a person, who would then die if the soul was gone too long. Qanasilis were giant spirits, Mamantainga were big-eared spirits with giant torsos who like to eat children. Spirit mediators could negotiate palinanutu hanitu with agitators to heal disease.

== Death ==
Hanitu were believed to dwell in a homeland to the west, named Lamungan or Mai-asang, to which they returned upon the death of an animate being.

== See also ==
- Anito
- Kami
- Kawas (mythology), the supernatural beliefs of nearby Amis.
