= Batak people (Philippines) =

Negrito ethnic group in the Philippines

Batak
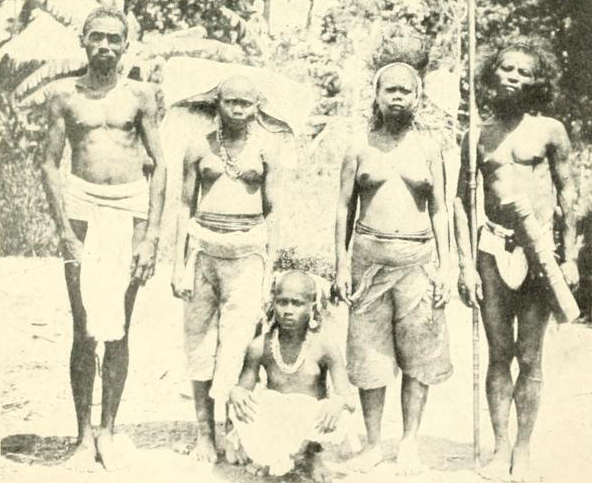
- Batak people in Palawan (c. 1913)

Total population
- 1,531 (2020 census)

Regions with significant populations
- Philippines; Palawan

Languages
- Palawan Batak, Filipino, English

Religion
- Christianity, Anito, folk religions

Related ethnic groups
- Aeta, other Negrito peoples

The Batak are one of about 140 indigenous peoples of the Philippines. They are located in the northeastern portions of Palawan, a relatively large island in the southwest of the archipelago. Since ancient times, the Batak have inhabited a series of river valleys along the coastline of what is today Puerto Princesa City.

There are only about 1,500 Batak remaining according to the 2020 census. Also called Tinitianes, the Batak are considered by anthropologists to be closely related to the Aeta of Central Luzon, another Negrito tribe. They tend to be small in stature, with dark skin and frizzy or curly hair, traits which originally garnered the "Negrito" groups their name. Still, there is some debate as to whether the Batak are related to the other Negrito groups of the Philippines or actually to other, physically similar groups in Indonesia or as far away as the Andaman Islands.

== History ==
The Batak have for centuries combined a hunting-gathering lifestyle with seeding of useful food plants, kaingin, a slash and burn farming method, and trading. The Batak had important trading connections with the maritime peoples of the Sulu region for many centuries of their history. They traded natural and forest goods in exchange for manufactured products.

The Batak were largely undisturbed until the arrival of the Americans in the final years of the nineteenth century. The reason for this was that the Bataks were within the margins of mainstream Filipino political and cultural life.

Since 1900, Filipinos and others began to migrate to the traditional regions where the Batak lived. This led to the resources and land of the Bataks dwindling. In the 1930s, the government attempted to establish reservations for the Batak in the coastal plains, but these were soon settled and overrun by Filipino migrants in the 1950s. This caused the Batak to move inland into the interior of the island.

During the mid to late 20th century, the Batak was easily pushed out of their preferred gathering grounds by the sea into the mountains by emigrant farmers, mostly from Luzon. Living in less fertile areas, they have attempted to supplement their income by harvesting and selling various nontimber forest products, such as rattan, tree resins, and honey. This has been met with resistance by the government and commercial collectors, who assert that the Batak have no legal right to these resources. Conservationists, however, have taken an interest in Batak's collection methods, which are much more sustainable than the techniques used by commercial concessionaires.

The Batak's way of life and survival is threatened by dwindling forest resources, partly due to mining and logging activities. Communities also experience high infant mortality and low birth rates.

The Batak are working to acquire Certificates of Ancestral Domains Titles for their traditional lands in Puerto Princesa.

== Culture ==
Batak people speak the Batak language. They may also speak Filipino, Tagbanua, and Cuyonon, and other Philippine languages used in neighboring communities.

The Batak were once a nomadic people, but have since, at the behest of the government, settled in small villages. Still, they often go on gathering trips into the forest for a few days at a time, an activity which has both economic and spiritual value for them. Their belief system is that of animism, which is belief in spirits that reside in nature. They classify spirits into the "Panya'en" who are malevolent and the "Diwata" are generally benevolent but are also capricious. Batak make regular offerings to these spirits, and Shamans undergo spiritual possession in order to communicate with the spirits and heal the sick.

Rapid depopulation, restricted forest access, sedentary living, and incursion by immigrants has devastated the group culturally. Today, very few Batak marry other Batak but tend to marry from other neighboring groups. The pattern has been that the children of these marriages tend not to follow Batak cultural ways, and today "pure" Batak are rare. They are also not reproducing to sustain their population. As a result, Batak are being absorbed into a more diffuse group of upland indigenous peoples who are slowing losing their tribal identities, and with it their unique spirituality and culture; there is even some debate as to whether or not they still exist as a distinct ethnic entity.

Batak families trace descent through both sides of the family. Kin relationships are similar to those of the Filipinos. Since the Batak are discouraged from using the birth name of their in-laws, they have multiple personal names. Divorce and remarriage used to be common and acceptable among the Batak but integration to mainstream Filipino society has changed this to a degree. Husbands and wives usually enjoy equal freedoms though the wives tend to live in their husband's household except for the early stages of the marriage when both live in the wife's household. Nuclear households are the basic economic unit though multiple households can and do pool their resources. However, the nuclear household is expected to be self-reliant. Batak households tend to have few children with the average being 3.5 persons.

== Subsistence ==
The Batak today engage in various occupations, which include foraging, selling forest-derived goods, practicing shifting cultivation, and working for Filipino farmers or other employers. The primary food sources for the Batak are squirrels, jungle fowl, wild pigs, honey, fruits, yams, fish, mollusks, crustaceans, and more. These food items mainly come from the forests in the region. The Batak employ various methods to capture animals, such as pigs, using bows and arrows, spears, dogs, or homemade guns. These methods have evolved over time, especially with the increasing influence from foreign sources.

When it came to trading, the Batak mostly sold rattan, honey, and Manila copal. In return, they received clothing materials, rice, and other goods.

A few Batak also cultivate rice, corn, sweet potato, and cassava. Wage labor for nearby farmers is important to the Batak economy. Batak men are usually hired out for a few days to do certain work like clearing weeds, harvesting, or to pick coconuts and coffee. Local tourism is also a source of revenue for the Bataks.

Tanabag Batak have names for 70 landraces of upland rice, 44 of which are considered "dati" (old) and "tunay" (original) to the Batak's ancestral land.

== Indigenous Batak religion ==
=== Immortals ===
- Maguimba: the god in the remotests times, lived among the people, having been summoned by a powerful babaylan (shaman); provided all the necessities of life, as well as all cures for illnesses; has the power to bring the dead back to life
- Diwata: a benevolent god who provides for the needs of women and men, and gives out rewards for good deeds
- Angoro: a deity who lives in Basad, a place beyond this world, where the souls find out whether they will enter the heavens called Lampanag, or be cast into the depths of Basad
- Deities of Strength
  - Siabuanan
  - Bankakah
  - Paraen
  - Buengelen
  - Baybayen
- Batungbayanin: spirit of the mountains
- Paglimusan: spirit of the small stones
- Balungbunganin: spirit of the almaciga trees
- Sulingbunganin: spirit of the big rocks
- Esa’: an ancestor whose movements created the landscapes, which he named during a hunting journey with his dogs, who were after wild pigs
- Baybay: the goddess and master of rice who originated from Gunay Gunay, the edge of the universe; married to Ungaw
- Ungaw: the god and master of bees who originated from Gunay Gunay, the edge of the universe; married to Baybay
- Panya’en: mystic entities who control certain wild trees and various animals
- Kiudalan: in charge of forest pigs
- Napantaran: in charge of forest pigs

== See also ==
- Molbog people
- Palawan people
- Tagbanwa people
