= Maero =

Supernatural people in Māori mythology

In Māori tradition, the Maero (or Mohoao) are an iwi-atua or supernatural people from New Zealand. They are sometimes described as giants or wild men of the woods, and inhabit mountains and forest, particularly in the South Island and Tararua Range. Maero are characterised as wild, malevolent and often violent, carrying stone clubs as weapons. They are covered in dark body hair and have long, bony fingers with sharp fingernails. They kill and eat humans and other animals.

The Maero are said to harbour anger towards the Māori, who arrived from Hawaiki, and are thought to have displaced them and ruined the tapu (sacredness) of their homes, forcing them to dwell in inhospitable alpine regions.

== In traditional Māori stories ==
In a story from the Whanganui area told by Tuao, chief of Upper Whanganui, Tukoio, a mortal man, once found a maero, a mohoao (wild man), and attacked it, cutting off its arms, legs and head. He brought the head back, but it was still alive and called for help. Tukoio did not want to fight a whole clan of maero, so he dropped it and came back later with reinforcements, only to find the maero had put itself back together and returned to the forest.

== See also ==
- Moehau
- Patupaiarehe
- Human cannibalism
- Wild man of the woods
