= Nuku-mai-tore =

Spirits in Māori mythology

In Māori mythology the Nuku-mai-tore are forest-dwelling spirits. Tura joins Whiro's canoe party, but when it enters a whirlpool he catches the overhanging boughs of a tree and lives among the Nuku-mai-tore. He teaches them the use of fire, the art of cooking, and the natural way of childbirth together with the ceremonies attending to the birth of a child.

== See also ==
- Patupaiarehe
- Menehune
- Taotao Mona
- Anito
