= Tukoio =

Figure from Māori mythology

Tukoio is the name of a legendary or mythological chief in Māori mythology.

In a story from the Māori tradition of the Whanganui area, Tukoio, a mortal man, came across a Maero or Mohoao, a wild person or monster much feared in Maori legend. The creature instantly attacked him, fighting fiercely until Tukoio cut off its limbs and head, which he took as a trophy back to his village. However, when the severed head cried out for help from its clan, Tukoio instantly dropped the head and ran, fearing retaliation. When he and some of his villagers returned, they found the Mohoao gone, having reassembled itself and returned to the forest.
