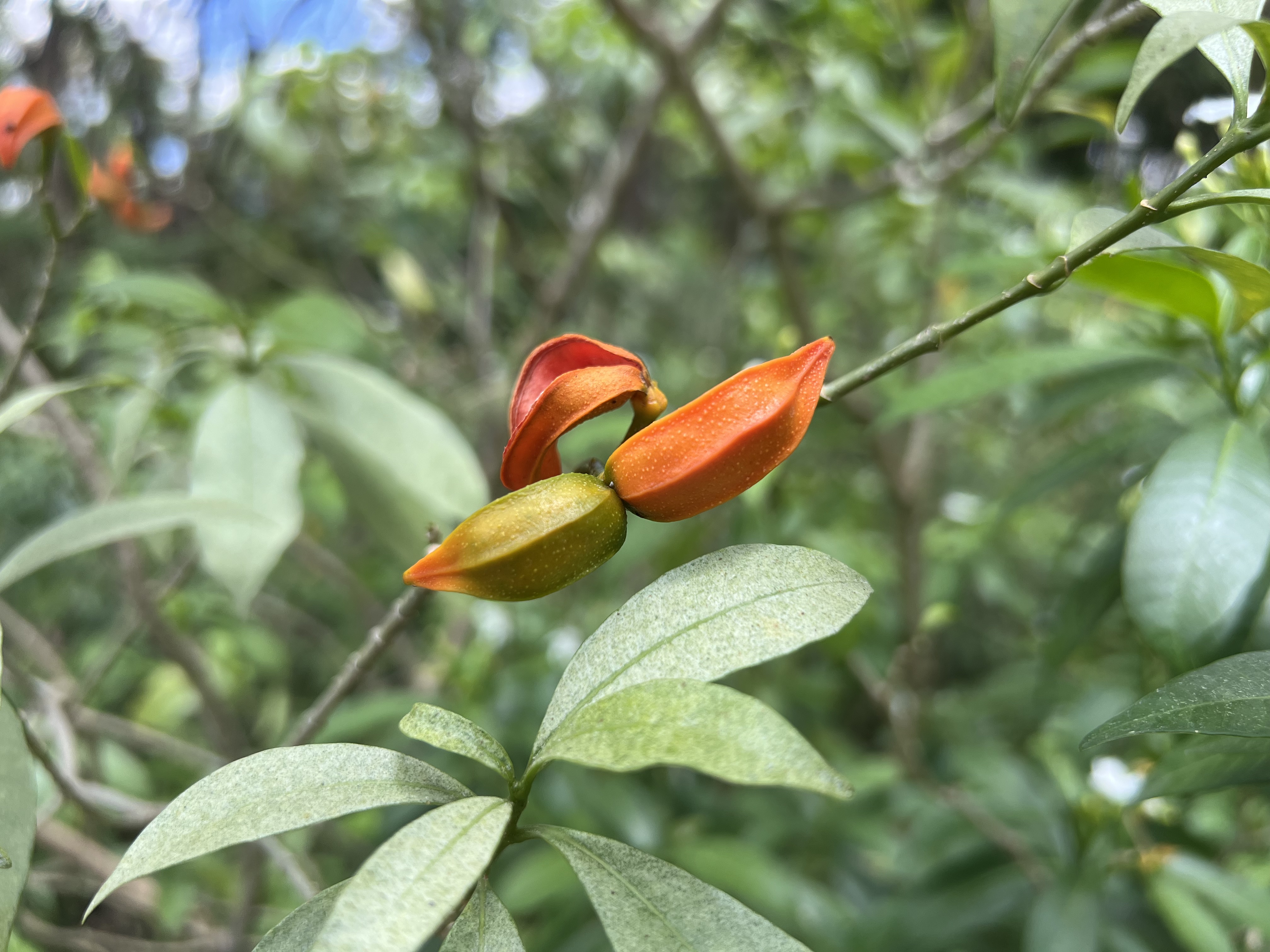
- Foliage and fruit detail

Conservation status
- Least Concern (IUCN 3.1)

Scientific classification
- Kingdom: Plantae
- Clade: Embryophytes
- Clade: Tracheophytes
- Clade: Angiosperms
- Clade: Eudicots
- Clade: Asterids
- Order: Gentianales
- Family: Apocynaceae
- Genus: Tabernaemontana
- Species: T. pandacaqui

Binomial name
- Tabernaemontana pandacaqui Lam.

Synonyms
- 92 synonyms: Ervatamia pandacaqui (Poir.) Pichon; Pagiantha pandacaqui (Poir.) Markgr.; Alstonia pacifica (Seem.) A.C.Sm.; Anartia recurva Miers; Ervatamia angustisepala (Benth.) Domin; Ervatamia benthamiana Domin; Ervatamia biflora (Elmer) Pichon; Ervatamia brachybotrys (Merr.) Pichon; Ervatamia calcicola Kerr; Ervatamia capsicoides (Merr.) Pichon; Ervatamia cumingiana (A.DC.) Markgr.; Ervatamia daemeliana Domin; Ervatamia decaisnei (A.DC.) Markgr.; Ervatamia ecarinata (Merr.) Pichon; Ervatamia eriophora Markgr.; Ervatamia floribunda (Blume) Pichon; Ervatamia floribunda var. villosiuscula Bakh.f.; Ervatamia hexagona (Merr.) Pichon; Ervatamia lifuana Boiteau & L.Allorge; Ervatamia linearifolia (Merr.) Markgr.; Ervatamia makateaensis H.St.John; Ervatamia merrilliana Markgr.; Ervatamia mindorensis (Merr.) Markgr.; Ervatamia montensis S.Moore; Ervatamia mucronata (Merr.) Markgr.; Ervatamia obtusiuscula Markgr.; Ervatamia oligantha (Merr.) Pichon; Ervatamia orientalis (R.Br.) Domin; Ervatamia parviflora Meijer Drees; Ervatamia polygama (Blanco) Markgr.; Ervatamia puberula Tsiang & P.T.Li; Ervatamia pubescens (R.Br.) Domin; Ervatamia pubescens var. barbatocalyx (Markgr.) Markgr.; Ervatamia pubescens var. glaberrima Bakh.f.; Ervatamia pubescens var. grandiflora Domin; Ervatamia pubescens subvar. lancifolia (Markgr.) Markgr.; Ervatamia pubescens var. punctulata (Warb.) Markgr.; Ervatamia pubescens var. superba Domin; Ervatamia pubescens var. typica Domin; Ervatamia punctulata (Warb.) Markgr.; Ervatamia punctulata var. barbatocalyx Markgr.; Ervatamia punctulata subvar. lancifolia Markgr.; Ervatamia rotensis Kaneh.; Ervatamia subglobosa (Merr.) Pichon; Pagiantha oligantha (Merr.) Markgr.; Pagiantha subglobosa (Merr.) Markgr.; Rejoua pacifica (Seem.) Markgr.; Tabernaemontana arborescens Perr.; Tabernaemontana biflora Elmer; Tabernaemontana brachybotrys Merr.; Tabernaemontana capsicoides Merr.; Tabernaemontana caudata Merr.; Tabernaemontana cerniflora Zipp. ex Span.; Tabernaemontana citrifolia G.Forst.; Tabernaemontana congestiflora Elmer; Tabernaemontana cumingiana A.DC.; Tabernaemontana decaisnei A.DC.; Tabernaemontana decaisnei var. petiolata A.DC.; Tabernaemontana diclinis K.Schum. & Lauterb.; Tabernaemontana ebracteata R.Br.; Tabernaemontana ecarinata Merr.; Tabernaemontana floribunda Blume; Tabernaemontana guangdongensis P.T.Li; Tabernaemontana hexagona Merr.; Tabernaemontana indica Poir.; Tabernaemontana laurifolia Blanco; Tabernaemontana laxiflora Teijsm. & Binn.; Tabernaemontana linearifolia Merr.; Tabernaemontana mindanaensis Merr.; Tabernaemontana mindorensis Merr.; Tabernaemontana mollis Hook. & Arn.; Tabernaemontana mucronata Merr.; Tabernaemontana multiflora Sm.; Tabernaemontana oligantha Merr.; Tabernaemontana orientalis R.Br.; Tabernaemontana orientalis var. angustifolia Benth.; Tabernaemontana orientalis var. angustisepala Benth.; Tabernaemontana orientalis var. grandifolia Valeton; Tabernaemontana pacifica Seem.; Tabernaemontana parviflora Decne.; Tabernaemontana polygama Blanco; Tabernaemontana puberula Merr.; Tabernaemontana pubescens R.Br.; Tabernaemontana pubescens Teijsm. & Binn.; Tabernaemontana punctulata Warb.; Tabernaemontana riedeliana Miq.; Tabernaemontana rotensis (Kaneh.) B.C.Stone; Tabernaemontana semperflorens Perr.; Tabernaemontana subglobosa Merr.; Tabernaemontana thailandensis P.T.Li; Tabernaemontana vitiensis Seem.; Benkara pandacaki (J.F.Gmel.) M.R.Almeida; Gardenia pandacaki J.F.Gmel.

= Tabernaemontana pandacaqui =

Species of plant

Tabernaemontana pandacaqui, known as windmill bush and banana bush, is a species of plant in the family Apocynaceae.

== Description ==
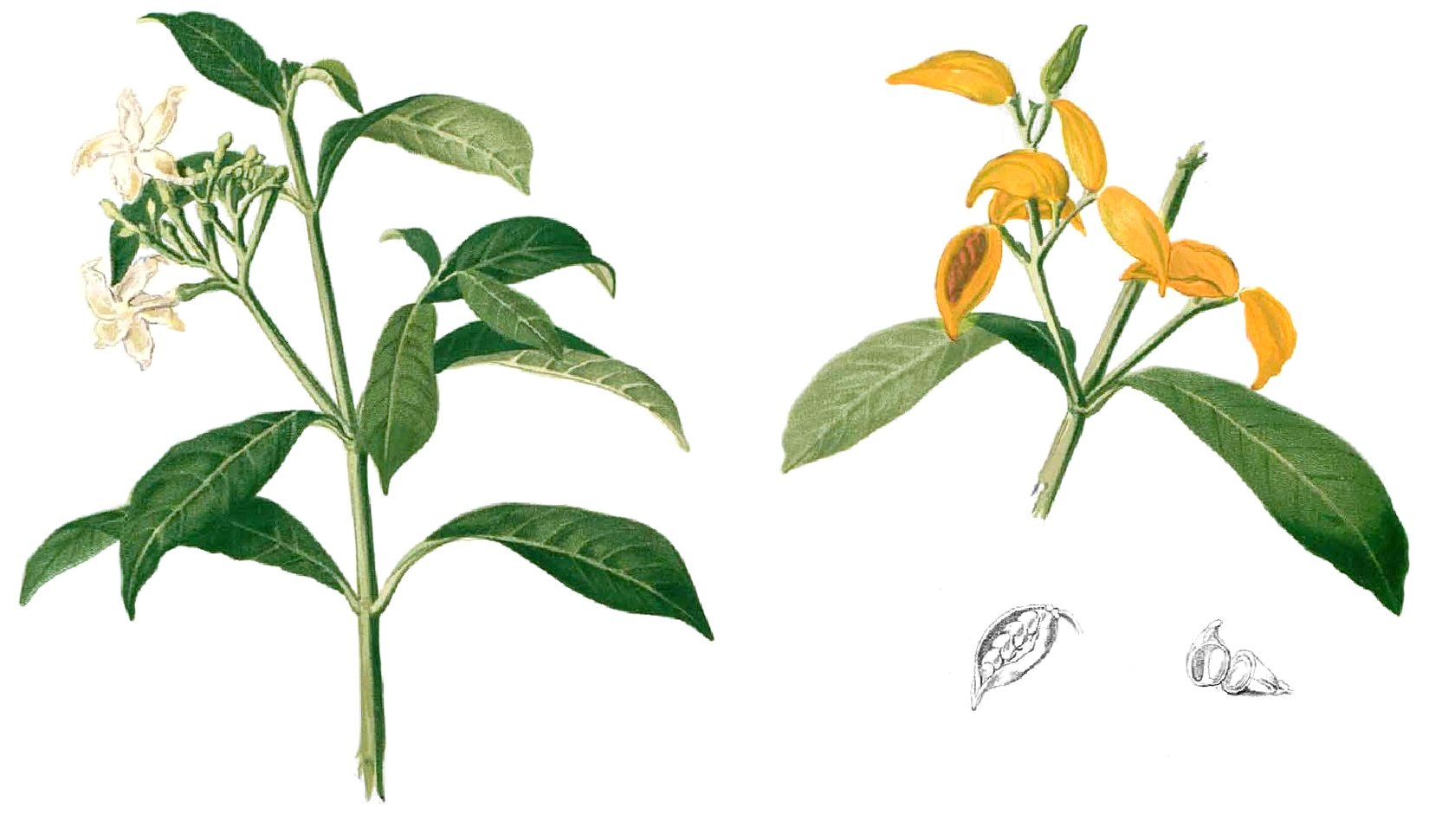
1880 illustration from Francisco Manuel Blanco (O.S.A.) - Flora de Filipinas, Gran edicion

Tabernaemontana pandacaqui grows as a shrub or tree up to 14 m (50 ft) tall. Its flowers feature white or pale yellow corolla lobes. The fruit is orange, red or yellow with paired follicles, each up to 7 cm (3 in) in diameter.

== Distribution and habitat ==
Tabernaemontana pandacaqui is native to China, Taiwan, Thailand, Malesia, Papua New Guinea, Australia and many Pacific islands. Plants in the Mariana islands of Guam and Rota are now considered to be a separate species, Tabernaemontana rotensis. It is found in a wide variety of habitats, particularly in drier areas. The species is also reportedly naturalized in the Windward Islands, Trinidad and Tobago and Panama.
