= Patupaiarehe =

Supernatural beings (he iwi atua) in Māori mythology

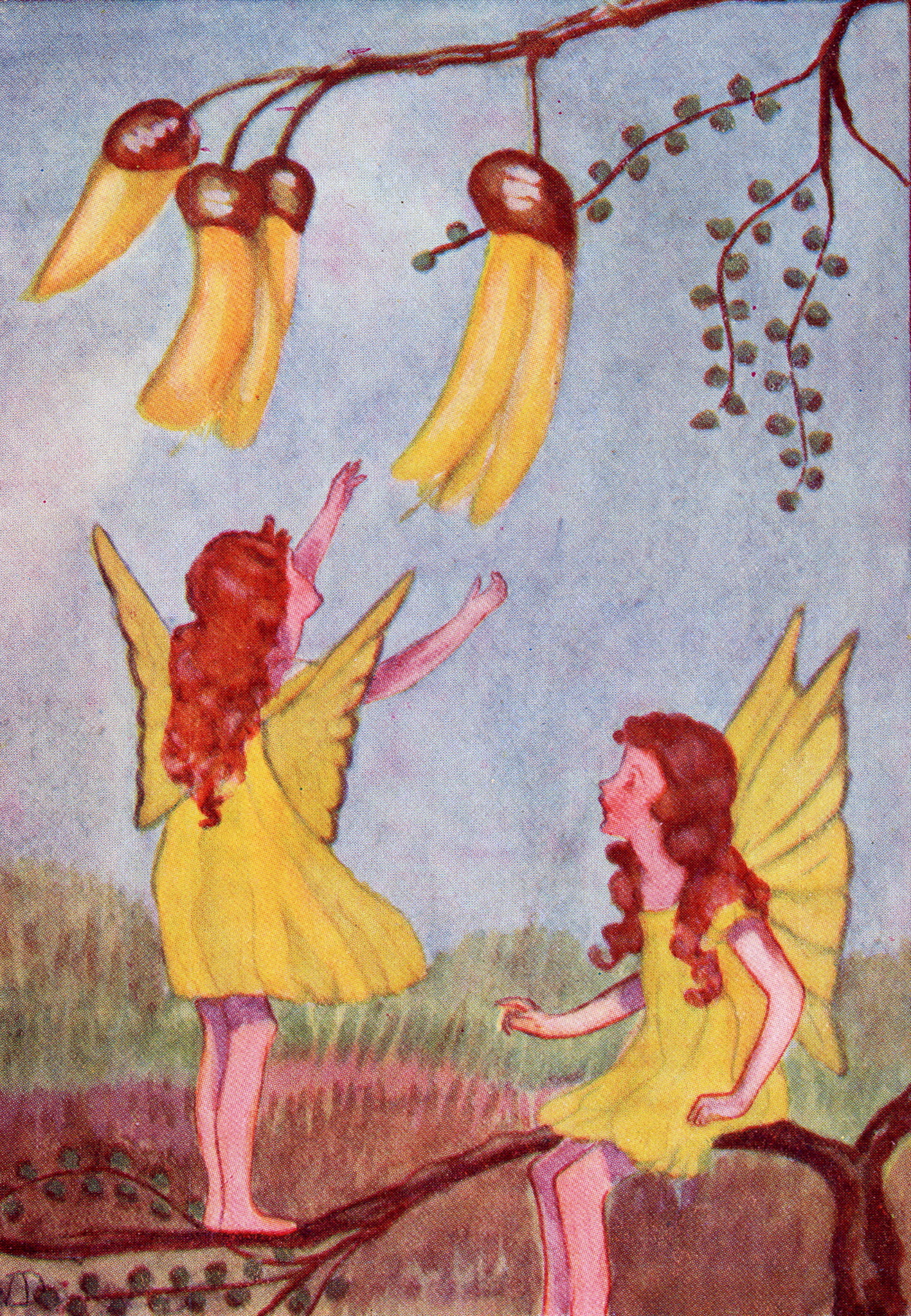
- An illustration of a "kōwhai fairy" by V. Deroles, 1925. "Patupaiarehe" has often been translated as "fairy-folk".

Creature information
- Grouping: Spirit
- Sub grouping: Fairy
- Similar entities: Maero; Menehune; Ponaturi
- Folklore: Oral tradition

Origin
- Country: New Zealand
- Habitat: Mountains and forests

Patupaiarehe are supernatural beings (he iwi atua) in Māori mythology that are described as pale to fair skinned with blonde or red hair, usually having the same stature as humans, but, unlike Māori, no tattoos. They tend to be nocturnal, or active on misty or foggy days, as direct sunlight can be fatal to them.

Patupaiarehe can be hostile to humans, especially those who intrude on their lands. They are believed to live in deep forests and hilly or mountainous regions, in large guarded communities, though their buildings and structures are invisible to human eyes. They prefer raw food and have an aversion to steam and fire.

The music of their kōauau and pūtōrino (bugle flutes), along with their singing of waiata occasionally reveals their presence on foggy days. The music of the Patupaiarehe is described as 'sweeter' than the music that Māori could play. According to most traditions, Māori are able to understand their language and converse with them.

Urukehu (fair or red-haired Māori) and albino Māori, are sometimes considered to have patupaiarehe ancestry. In some traditions, Patupaiarehe are considered the owners of albino birds and eels and also red flax.

A less common term for patupaiarehe was pakehakeha, which has been suggested as a possible origin of the word pākehā, used to refer to Europeans. It has been theorised that when the first European explorers clashed with Ngāti Tūmatakōkiri (of the Kurahaupō) in mid-December 1642, the iwi may have interpreted the newcomers as patupaiarehe.

== North Island traditions ==
In the North Island, patupaiarehe inhabited mountains such as Mount Ngongotahā, Mount Pirongia, the Coromandel Range from Mount Moehau to Mount Te Aroha, the Urewera Ranges, and the Waitākere Ranges.

According to Ngāi Tūhoe they were small beings, while the Whanganui Māori say they were at least two metres tall. Mohi Tūrei of Ngāti Porou described their skin as white, albino, or the colour of red ochre.

In one story, a man named Kahukura happened across the patupaiarehe pulling in their fishing nets during the night, and offered to help them. When they realised he was a mortal, they fled from him.

=== Moehau patupaiarehe ===
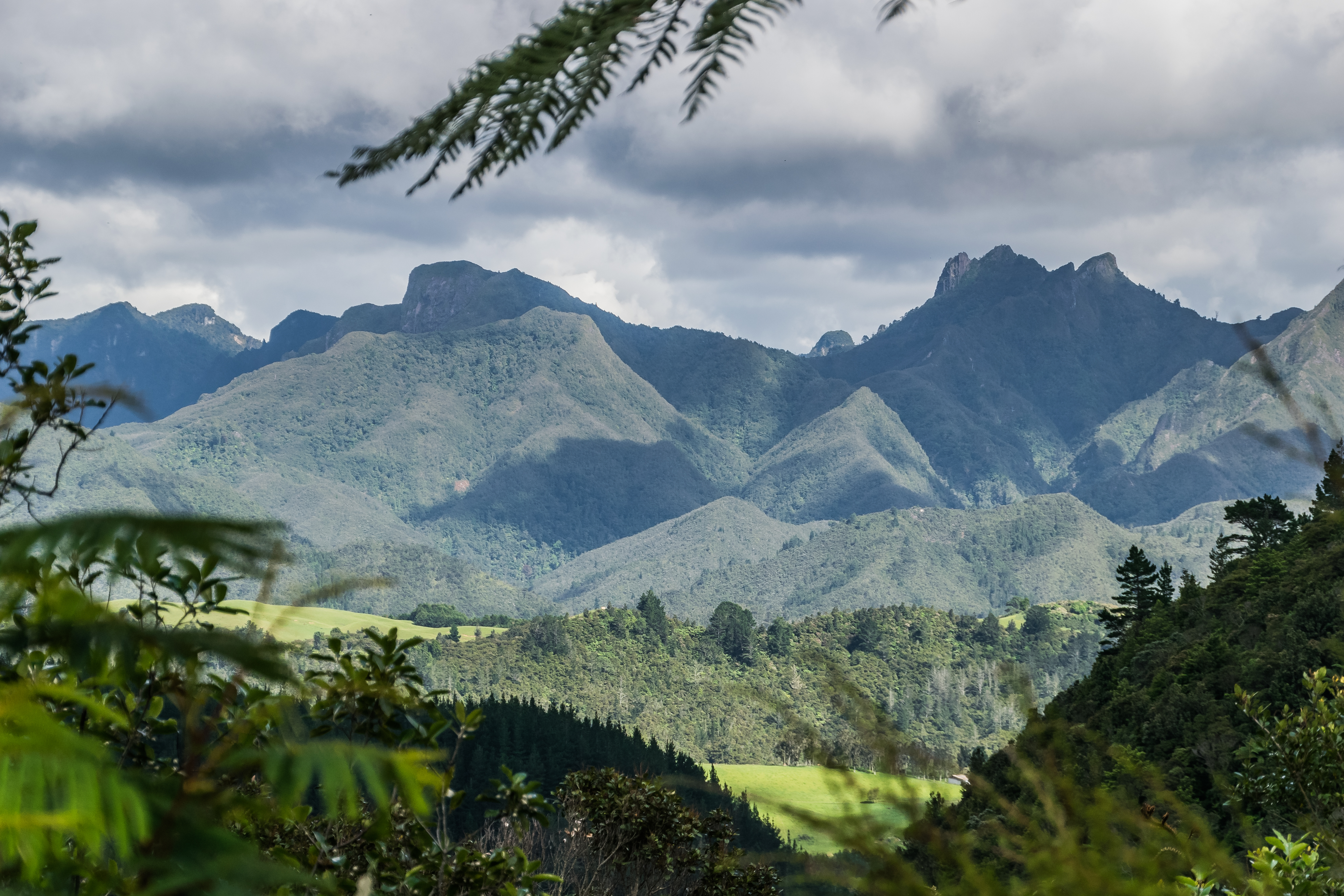
Coromandel range

In traditions recounted by the Ngāti Maru elder Hoani Nahe, the patupaiarehe were inhabitants of the country before Māori arrived. Their hapū were Ngāti Kura, Ngāti Korakorako, and Ngāti Tūrehu. Their chiefs were Tahurangi, Whanawhana, Nukupori, Tuku, Ripiroaitu, Tapu-te-uru, and Te Rangipouri.

Part of the reason that patupaiarehe were hostile was said to be because the Māori had driven them from Mount Moehau, where the ancestor Tamatekapua is buried in a cave at the peak of the mountain, which was said to be marked by a tree fern. Mount Moehau was described as their most treasured place.

In the traditions of the Hauraki Māori, a patupaiarehe woman named Hinerehia is credited as bringing the knowledge of weaving to the Māori. Hinerehia hailed from Moehau Range and fell in love with a Māori man who she met while gathering shellfish on a misty low tide in the Waitematā Harbour. She lived with him at Mōtuihe and they had several children together. Hinerehia wove only at night; frustrated by this, the women of the village asked the tohunga to trick her into weaving past dawn so that they could learn the skill. The tohunga asked the women to cover the windows from the dawn light and he asked the birds to be silent instead of ushering in the dawn with song as they usually did. In this way they succeeded, but when Hinerehia realised she had been tricked she flew back to Moehau within a cloud, distraught at leaving her husband and children.

During the time of chief Matatahi, five Ngāti Rongoū (or Ngāi Rongoi) men went out hunting. After setting out they discovered a calabash hanging from a rewarewa tree, which they cut down and claimed as theirs. They continued walking and eventually found the path to be blocked by supplejack, which had been twisted around so that, while it was still growing, it formed a fence within which the patupaiarehe were growing plants such as rangiora. They continued, caught a pig, and returned to the calabash. One man tried to carry the calabash back but it was so heavy that he almost passed out from the weight; he constantly needed to rest, so they discarded it and continued to their village. The next day when they cooked the pig they had caught, they found nothing in the hāngī but skin and bone once they had opened it. That night, the man who tried to carry the calabash was dragged from his home. He tried to resist by clinging to a couple of trees, but the patupaiarehe were so strong that the trees were pulled out of the ground, and he was carried to the water and drowned. The other four men were also killed.

=== Ngongotahā patupaiarehe ===
Ngongotahā

According to one Te Matehaere of Arawa, the peak of Mount Ngongotahā was called Te Tuahu a te Atua (“The Altar of the God”), and served as the principal home of the Ngāti Rua tribe of patupaiarehe 600 years ago during the time of Īhenga. Their chiefs were Tuehu, Te Rangitamai, Tongakohu, and Rotokohu. They were not an aggressive people, and they were not war-loving.

They were thought to number at least a thousand, and their skin colours ranged from pākehā-white, to the same colour as an ordinary Māori, with most of them being 'reddish'. Their hair had a red or golden tinge, and their eyes were black or, like some pākehā, blue, and they were as tall as any other human. The women were beautiful, described as 'very fair of complexion, with shining fair hair'. Their clothes were pakerangi (flax garments dyed red), and pora and pureke ('rough mats').

Their diets consisted of forest-food and whitebait caught from Lake Rotorua. These patupaiarehe had an aversion to steam, however. Whenever the people living close to a patupaiarehe home (such as at Te Raho-o-te-Rangipiere) opened their hāngī, the patupaiarehe would allegedly lock themselves away to avoid the steam. Where they lived, Te Tuahu a te Atua, was a dry place with no sources of water (possibly as a further precaution against humid conditions), so they had to climb down to the 'northern cliffs, near the side of the Kauae spur', which happened to be the sacred burial place of the Ngāti Whakaue iwi. They carried the water back to the summit of the mountain inside tahā (gourds, calabashes).

An early Arawa explorer of the Rotorua region, Īhenga, had many encounters with the patupaiarehe who lived at Mount Ngongotahā. When he first ventured into their pā, the patupaiarehe were very inquisitive and wanted to keep him, particularly a beautiful woman patupaiarehe who wanted Īhenga for a husband. Īhenga drank water proffered in a calabash, then, sensing a trap, fled the mountain in hot pursuit, only escaping the patupaiarehe by smearing foul-smelling shark oil on his skin.

== South Island traditions ==
In the South Island, patupaiarehe are mostly replaced by the Maero, a different race of supernatural beings, though legends about patupaiarehe are still present. James Cowan suggested that if the patupaiarehe did exist they might have been descendants of an early South Island iwi called Hāwea, whose skin was described as 'ruddy or copper-coloured'.

According to Hōne Taare Tīkao, they inhabited the hills of Banks Peninsula and in the heights above Lyttelton Harbour on mountains and ranges such as Poho-o-Tamatea immediately behind Rāpaki Bay; Te Pohue, between Purau and Port Levy; Hukuika Peak, between Pigeon Bay and Little River; Te U-kura near Hilltop, Banks Peninsula; and the high, rocky peaks of French Hill; O-te-hore, above French Farm; O-te-patatu (Purple Peak), Tara-te-rehu, and Otaki, all which overlook Akaroa, and lastly Tuhiraki (Mt Bossu). Other places which they lived included the hills between Lake Brunner and the Arahura River, and the mountains around Lake Wakatipu.

Kāi Tahu tradition, as recounted by Tikao, states that patupaiarehe drove the titi to extinction on O-te-patatu due to overexploitation. A Kāi Tahu-Kāti Māmoe woman of the area was said to have a lover who was patupaiarehe, and after the birds were driven away she chanted a waiata pleading that the birds return so that the spirit-people come back to the mountain peak and play their flutes.

=== Kaiheraki of Tākitimu ===
In a story recounted from Hone Te Paina of Oraka, Foveaux Strait; on the Tākitimu Mountains there haunts a woman patupaiarehe named Kaiheraki, who appears as a spectrelike giantess striding along the mountaintops on misty days.

Kaiheraki's story begins with a mortal man named Hautapu who was a skilled hunter and tohunga. While out hunting with his dog (kurī), Hautapu heard a 'sharp metallic noise' which sounded like two pieces of pounamu being hit together. At first he suspected it to be a takahē, but just as he was about to go and investigate, he noticed a pair of dark gleaming eyes against a pale-white face staring back at him from behind a bush, with just 'a glint of coppery hair'. The appearance was startling, but Hautapu ran into the thickets nonetheless. The face turned out to belong to a crouched woman who had been too astonished and too terrified to flee from the hunter. Hautapu took her by her exposed shoulder and brought her out into the sunlight, and right then and there claimed her as his wife on account of her appearance; tall, young, fair-skinned, full and round 'erect breasts', broad vigorous hips, 'generous curves', sturdy limbs, and flowing thick hair which 'shone with a ruddy bronze tint in the sun.' Her garment was a waistmat made from the leaves of Cordyline.

When asked who she was and where she had come from, she replied with “Kaiheraki is my name. I have no people, I come of no race, and I know no one. My home is yonder, [the Tākitimu Mountains].” and further “I am a Māori, yet not a Māori. I know many tongues; I know the tongues of the birds. I am the child of the mountain; Tākitimu is my mother.” Hautapu immediately recognised that she was a patupaiarehe, and though he wanted her as his wife, he as a tohunga knew that her supernatural nature might forever bind him to the mountain. He decided to perform a ritual to free her from her status as such a being, and set about to prepare a ritual involving fire. Kaiheraki gasped in amazement at the sight of the smoke and fire once it had actually been started, but a tiny spark of the flame jumped onto her bare foot and immediately spurt forth a thin stream of blood. She made an attempt to run from this but Hautapu quickly caught her, bringing her back to continue the fire, only for her to quickly dart away in an instant that he stopped paying attention to her. After that, he never saw her again.

== See also ==
- Nuku-mai-tore
- Menehune, similar supernatural beings in Hawaii
- Taotao Mona, similar supernatural beings in the Marianas
- Anito, similar supernatural beings in the Philippines
- Engkanto, similar supernatural beings in the Philippines
