= Taotao Mona =

Protective spirits of the Mariana Islands

Taotao Mo'na, also commonly written as taotaomona or taotaomo'na (Chamoru taotao, "person/people" and mo'na "precede", loosely translated as "people before history" or "ancient people"), are spirits of ancient giant inhabitants believed to protect the mountains and wild places of the Mariana Islands, which include Luta, Saipan, Tinian and Guam, in Micronesia. Belief in Taotao Mo'na is present throughout these islands.

== Academic accounts ==
With the Spanish conquest of Guam in the 17th and 18th centuries, and the resultant destruction of the old way of life of the native Chamorros, went also the practice of ancestor veneration. Early Spanish accounts of Chamorros did not include any mention of Taotao Mo'na. The concept of Taotao Mo'na therefore appears to have emerged during the Spanish occupation and was created by the Chamorros who "turned to the memory of their Before Time Ancestors for pride and comfort." The modern stories of Taotao Mo'na tend to be simple superstitions in which Taotao Mo'na are mischievous or monstrous, rather than the complex myths of pre-Contact Chamorros, such as the creation story of the gods Puntan and Fu'una or the Three Feats of Strength by Chief Gadao.

== Behavior of Taotao Mo'na ==
Despite the modernity of most Chamorros, there is still a healthy respect for Taotao Mo'na. It is thought that if they are offended, they can cause bad influences in a particular location or towards a particular person. Taotao Mo'na are believed to inhabit any secluded natural place on the island particularly in the south of the island. Locals and "traditional" Chamorros claim that one must request permission from the Taotao Mo'na before entering the jungle or taking fruit or wood from it. Another enduring superstition is their dislike of pregnant women. Pregnant Chamorro women are often told to use perfume to mask their scent or to wear their husband's clothing, and to stay indoors at night to keep taotaomo'na away.

Some Taotao Mo'na are described as being headless and malicious if their land is not respected, while some are said to be gentler spirits who aid local witch doctors, called suruhanas or suruhanus. Taotao Mo'na have been known to pinch, bruise, imitate voices and kidnap children for short periods of time. People also claim taotaomo'na can become attached to certain people they like, making them ill - and only a visit to a suruhana can make the spirit go away.

The Taotao Mo'na were investigated in a segment of the Syfy television show Destination Truth entitled "Guam Zombies," where they were (incorrectly) said to appear as zombie-like; however, the Taotao Mo'na are not zombies, but ancestral spirits that are said to live within banyan trees. The trees themselves are said to have moving roots that change direction every night.

== See also ==
- Anito, similar supernatural beings in the Philippines
- Taotao, carved representations of ancestor spirits in the Philippines
- Menehune, similar supernatural beings in Hawaii
- Patupaiarehe, similar supernatural beings in Māori mythology
- Aitu
- Atua
- Tiki
- Moai
