= Tagalog alphabet (disambiguation) =

Tagalog alphabet may refer to:

- Abakada alphabet, indigenized Latin alphabet of the Tagalog language
  - Filipino alphabet, standardized version of the Abakada alphabet, used in the Filipino language
- Baybayin, ancient Philippine script
  - Tagalog (Unicode block), Unicode block containing Baybayin characters
