= University of Santo Tomas Baybayin Documents =

17th century land deeds

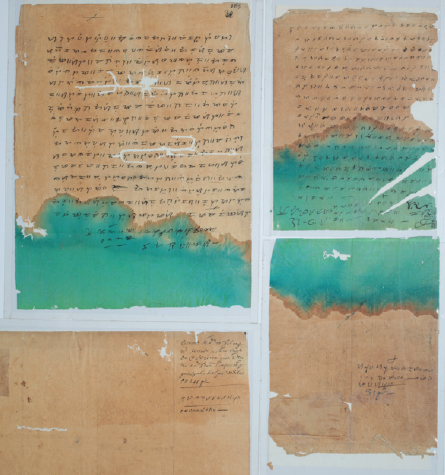
- Created: February 15, 1613 (413 years ago) (Document A); December 4, 1625 (400 years ago) (Document B)
- Location: Archives of the University of Santo Tomas
- Author(s): Doña Catalina Bayiya (Document A); Doña Maria Sila (Document B)
- Signatories: Document A: Doña Maria Guitui; Luis Paudata; Don Agustin Casa; Document B: Don Antonio Banaag; Don Mateo Pasabongan; Don Agustin Casa
- Purpose: Transfer of land ownership

The University of Santo Tomas Baybayin Documents or UST Baybayin Documents are two 17th-century land deeds written in Baybayin script.

Due to their historical significance, the documents were declared a National Cultural Treasure by the National Archives of the Philippines Director Victorino Manalo during the Second Baybayin Conference at the Museum of the Filipino People, Manila on 22 August 2014. The declaration was the first made by the Philippines' National Archives, and the Baybayin Documents the first paper documents declared a National Cultural Treasure.

The documents are the fifth declared National Cultural Treasure for the University of Santo Tomas (UST) after the declarations on the UST Main building, UST Central Seminary building, Arch of the Centuries, and UST Open Ground.

In 2026, the documents were included in the UNESCO Memory of the World Regional Register.

== Baybayin ==
Baybayin historically refers to a Brahmic syllabic script used in the Philippines for the Tagalog language before and early into the Spanish conquest. It uses three characters for standalone vowels and fourteen for consonants. Baybayin is an abugida, and each character can represent either a single consonant or vowel, or an entire syllable. Related syllabic scripts are still being used by the Palaw'an and Tagbanua peoples on Palawan Island as well as the Hanunuo and Buhid Mangyan peoples on Mindoro Island.

== Description ==
The UST Baybayin documents cover two legal real estate transactions in 1613 (labelled as Document A dated February 15, 1613) and 1625 (labelled as Document B dated December 4, 1625) which are the "longest and most complete documents completely handwritten in baybayin". The two documents are part of a book compilation of baybayin documents dubbed as the "biggest collection of extant ancient baybayin scripts in the world". They are also the oldest known deeds of sale for land in the Philippines during the Spanish colonization.

The 1613 documents established Don Andrés Capiit as the land owner after buying irrigated land in Tondo from Doña Catalina Baycan as described in Document A. He was married to Doña Francisca Longar who bought the land in Mayhaligue (now Santa Cruz, Manila) from Doña María Silang as described in the 1625 document (Document B). When Capiit died sometime between 1613 and 1625, Longar was remarried to Don Luis Castilla, who sold some lands to the University of Santo Tomas in 1629. When the ownership of Castilla was contested in court, he showed Documents A and B as proof of ownership. Since the university already acquired the land, the deeds of sale were later transferred into the university's custody.

The baybayin documents were first shown in the public during the tercentenary of the university in 1911. That same year, the documents were first published in Libertas, a daily newspaper published by the university.

== Management ==
The UST Miguel de Benavides Library

The Archives of the University of Santo Tomas at the Miguel de Benavides Library take care of the documents. The original baybayin documents are not available to the public and only replicas of the documents are made available through the university archives' bulletin board on the fifth floor of the Central Library.
