= Archivo de la Universidad de Santo Tomas =

Central repository

Coordinates: 14°36′35.5″N 120°59′21.5″E

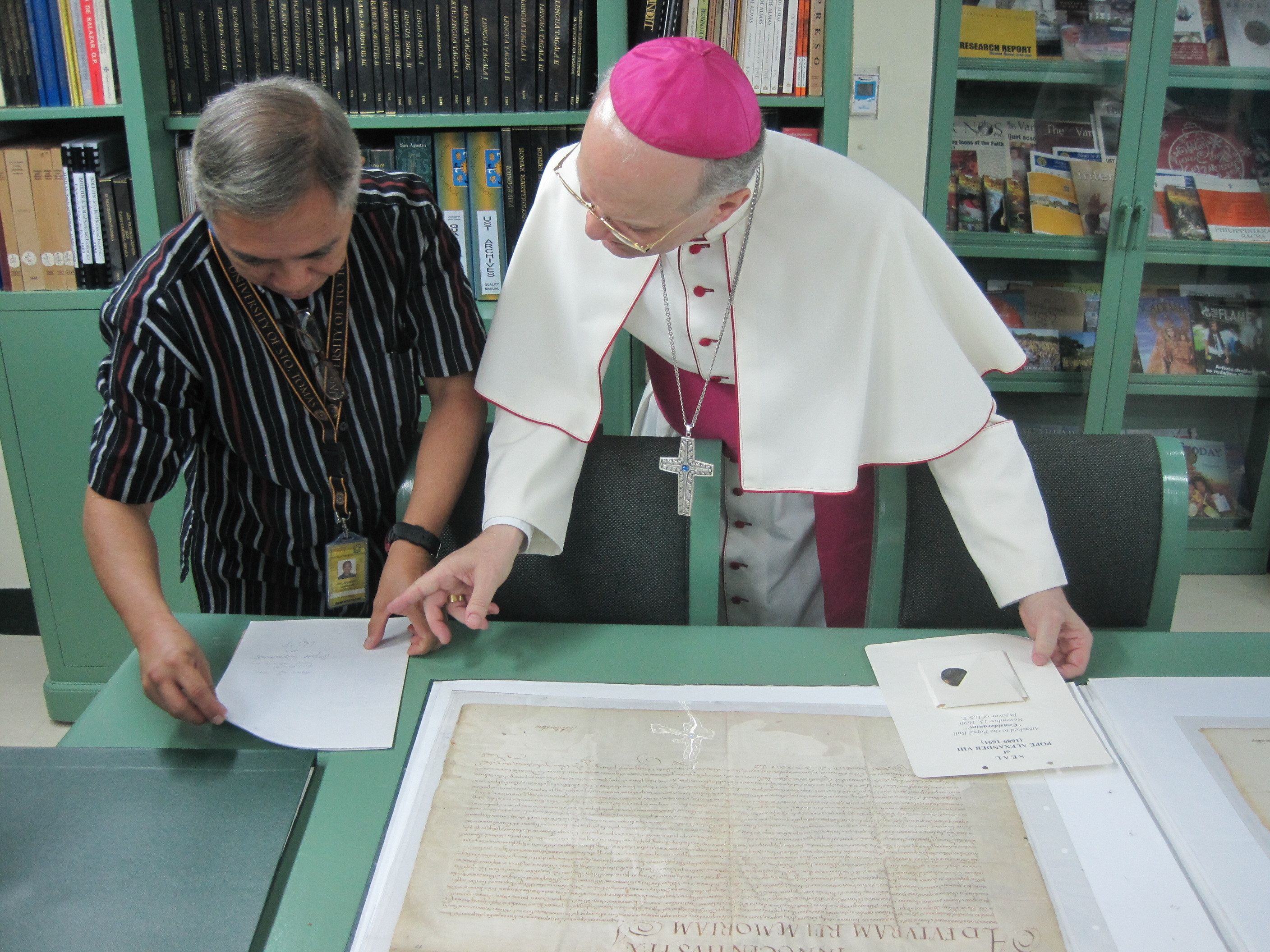
Angelo Vincenzo Zani, Secretary of the Congregation for Catholic Education of the Holy See (Vatican), examining historic documents related to the university's establishment during his visit to the Archives, on 21 January 2015.

The Archivo de la Universidad de Santo Tomas (AUST), also known as the Archives of the University of Santo Tomas, is located at the Miguel de Benavides Library in Manila. The AUST is the central repository of historical and rare documents pertaining to, but not exclusively, the history of the University of Santo Tomas, one of the oldest existing universities in Asia, and the oldest institution of higher learning in the Philippines. The collections consist of historical documents such as Papal bulls, royal decrees, rare Filipiniana prints, historical treatises, addresses, sermons, novenas, catechisms in many Philippine languages, national periodicals, and academic records of all educational institutions in the Philippines during the Spanish period. The archives are also home to the only incunabula, or books printed before 1500, in the country.

Aside from having one of the largest collection of 15th-, 16th-, 17th-, and 18th-century European manuscripts in Asia, the archives also boasts of possessing the biggest collection of extant ancient baybayin scripts in the world.

== Collection ==
The oldest book is an incunabulum by a Jewish historian and translated into Spanish. Josefo Flavio's La Guerra Judaica was printed in 1492 and recounted the Jewish wars with the Romans. Other books in the collection include numerous existing samples of the ancient Tagalog script baybayin written on paper, including the only two known complete long texts handwritten in Baybayin, covering real estate transactions in 1615 and 1635 known as the UST Baybayin Documents which were declared National Treasures in August 2014, a first edition 16th Century copy of Nicholas Copernicus' groundbreaking book on the revolution of celestial bodies, and the very rare Plantin Polyglot Bible, printed between 1569 and 1573 under the support of King Philip II of Spain.

== The Lumina Pandit Exhibition ==
To mark the 400th anniversary of the University of Santo Tomas, the Archives department for the first time released to the public some of its rare collections in the university's exhibit entitled Lumina Pandit: An Exhibition of Historical Treasures. Among the exhibited manuscripts is one of the first dictionaries in the country, the Arte de la Lengua of Fr. Francisco Blancas de San Jose, OP, as well as a similar Tagalog dictionary by the Franciscan Fr. Juan de Plasencia. Also displayed were the Sucesos de las Islas Filipinas of Antonio de Morga, the first history book of the Philippines; and the Librong Pagaaralan nang Manga Tagalog nang Uicang Castilla of Tomas Pinpin, the first printed book written in Tagalog and printed by a native

== Services ==
Only the microfilm collections are allowed to be viewed by researchers. Services are made available to the faculty, staff and students of UST as well as to outsiders. UST students are required to present his/her library card and a letter from the adviser or Department Head. Research fee of P20.00 per visit is charged for researchers. Microfilm reader fee is P2.00 per hour, while a fee of P4.00 per page is charged for the microfilm printer. The microfilm section is open to researchers every Tuesdays to Fridays at 9:00 to 12:00 PM, and 1:00 to 5:00 PM.

== Gallery ==
Archivo de la Universidad de Santo Tomas
Shown here are some of the hundreds of rare book in the archives
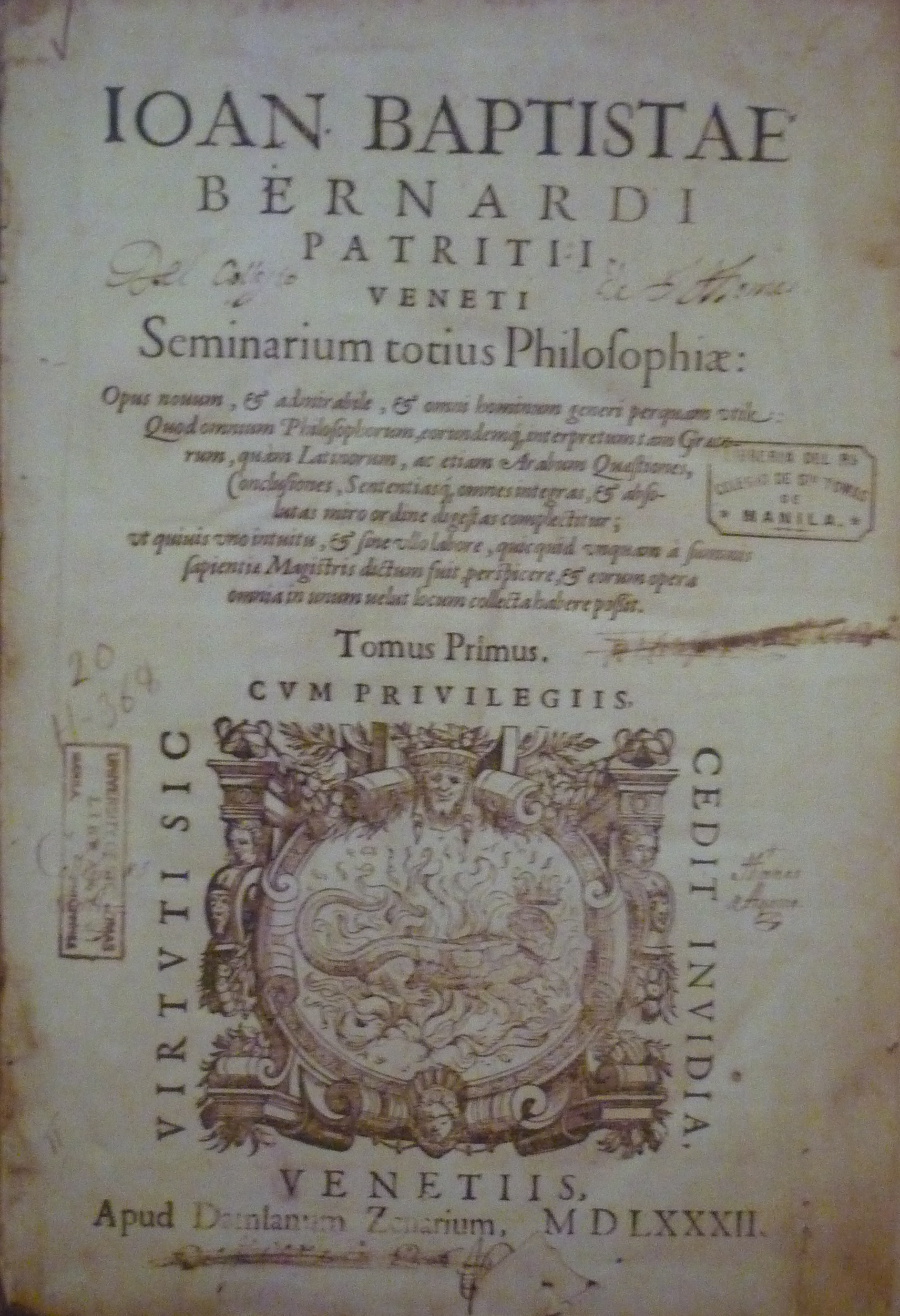
Seminarium Totius Philosophiae, 1582

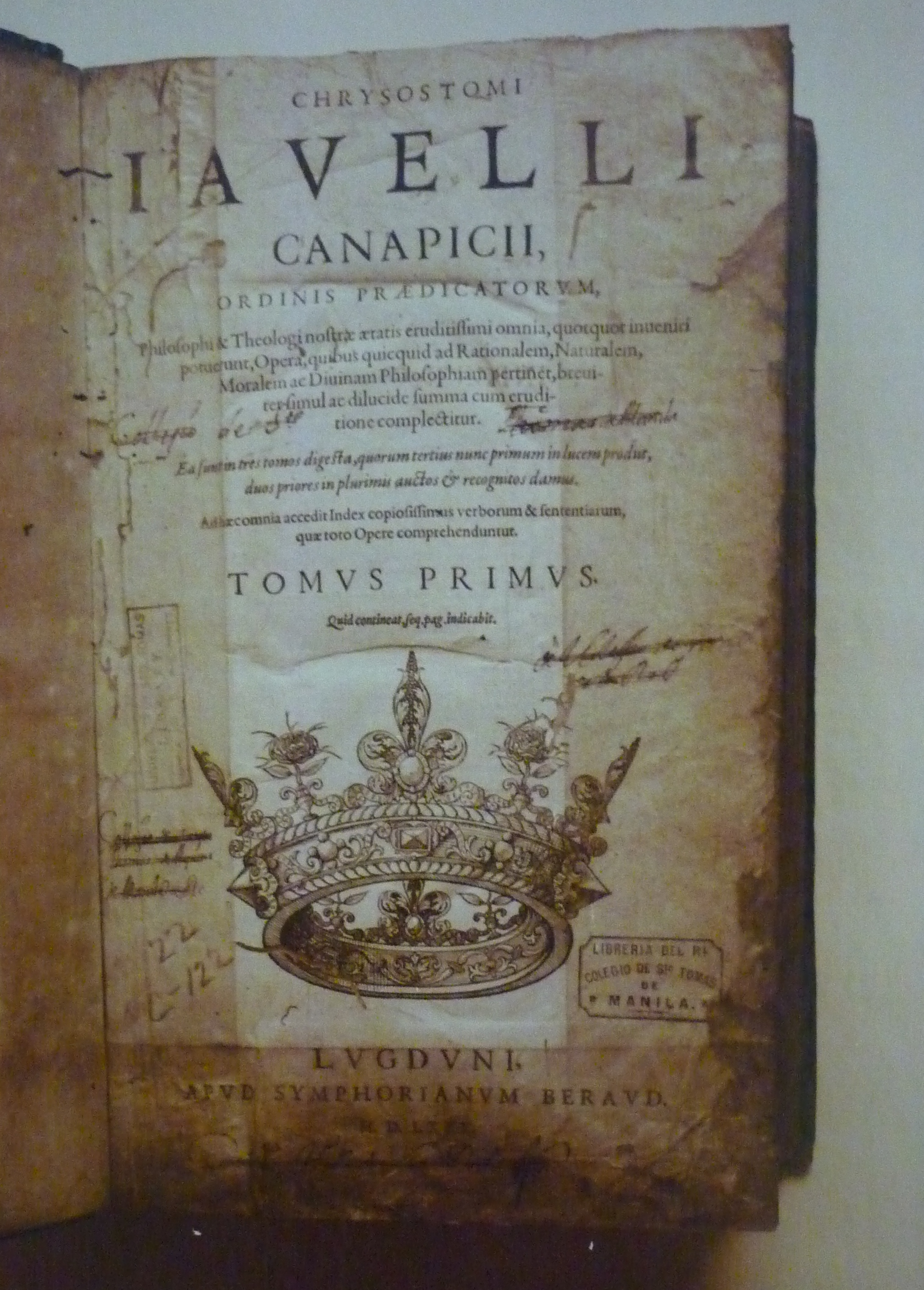
Opera, 1580

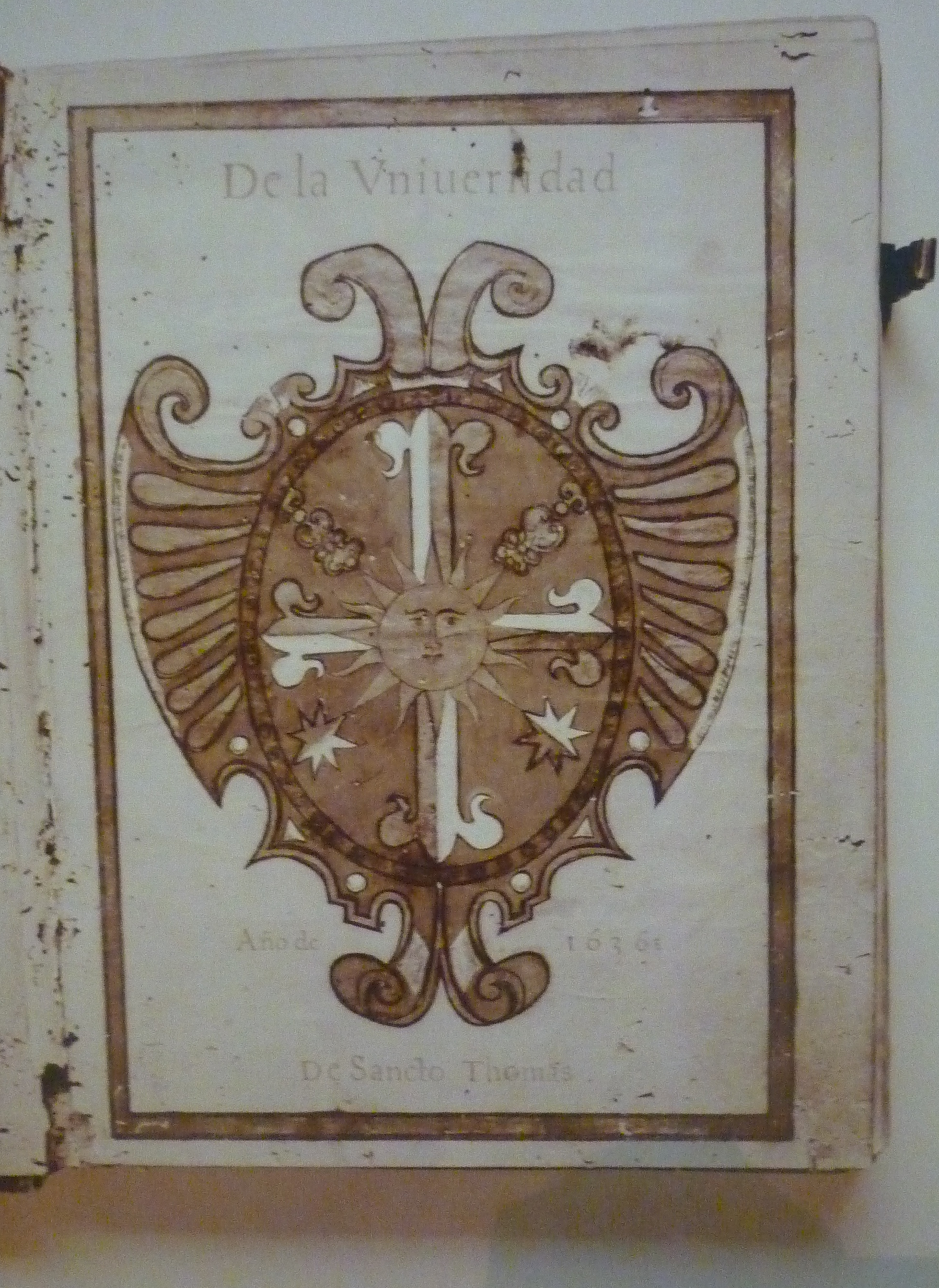
17th Century Libro de Piques

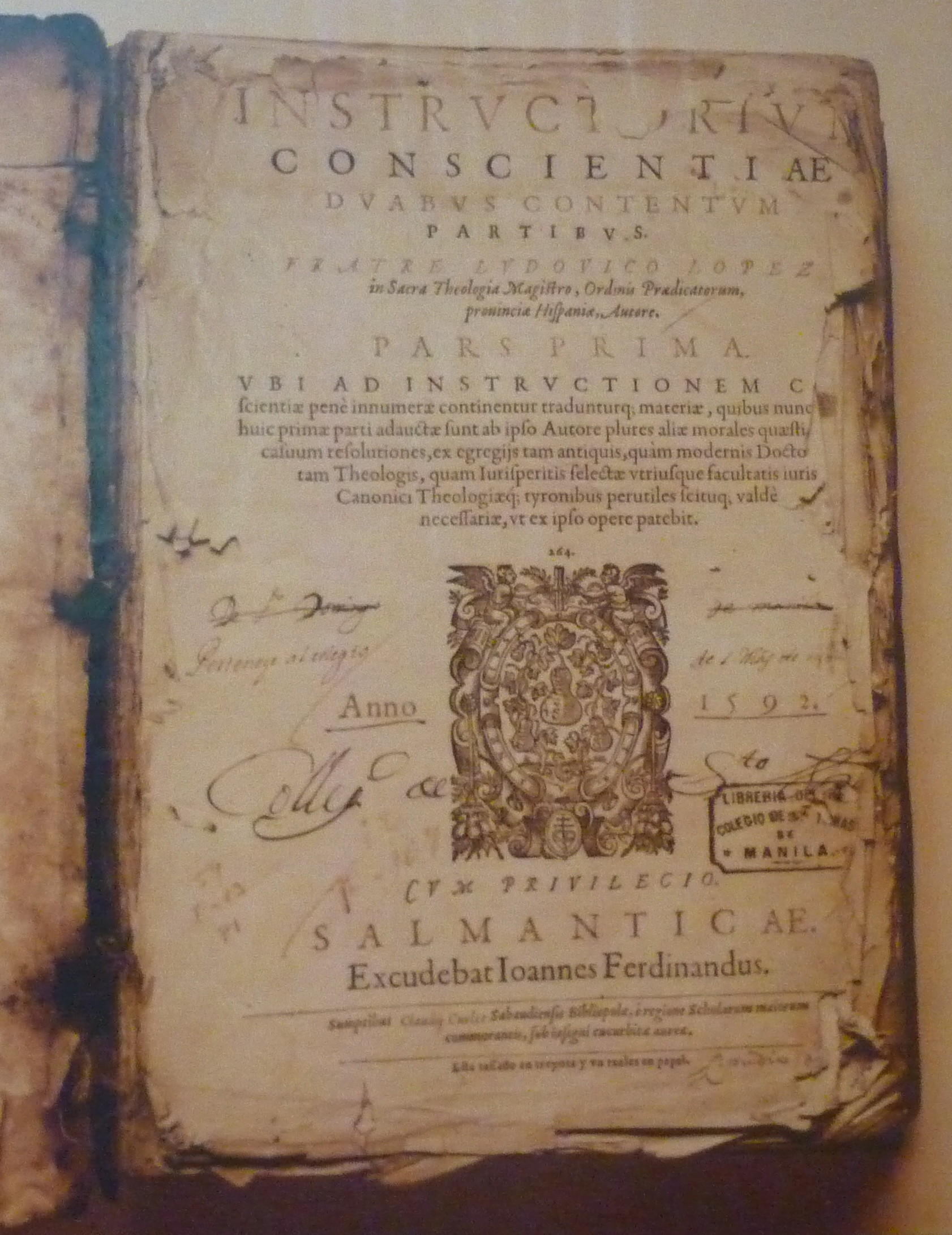
Instructorium Conscientiae 1592

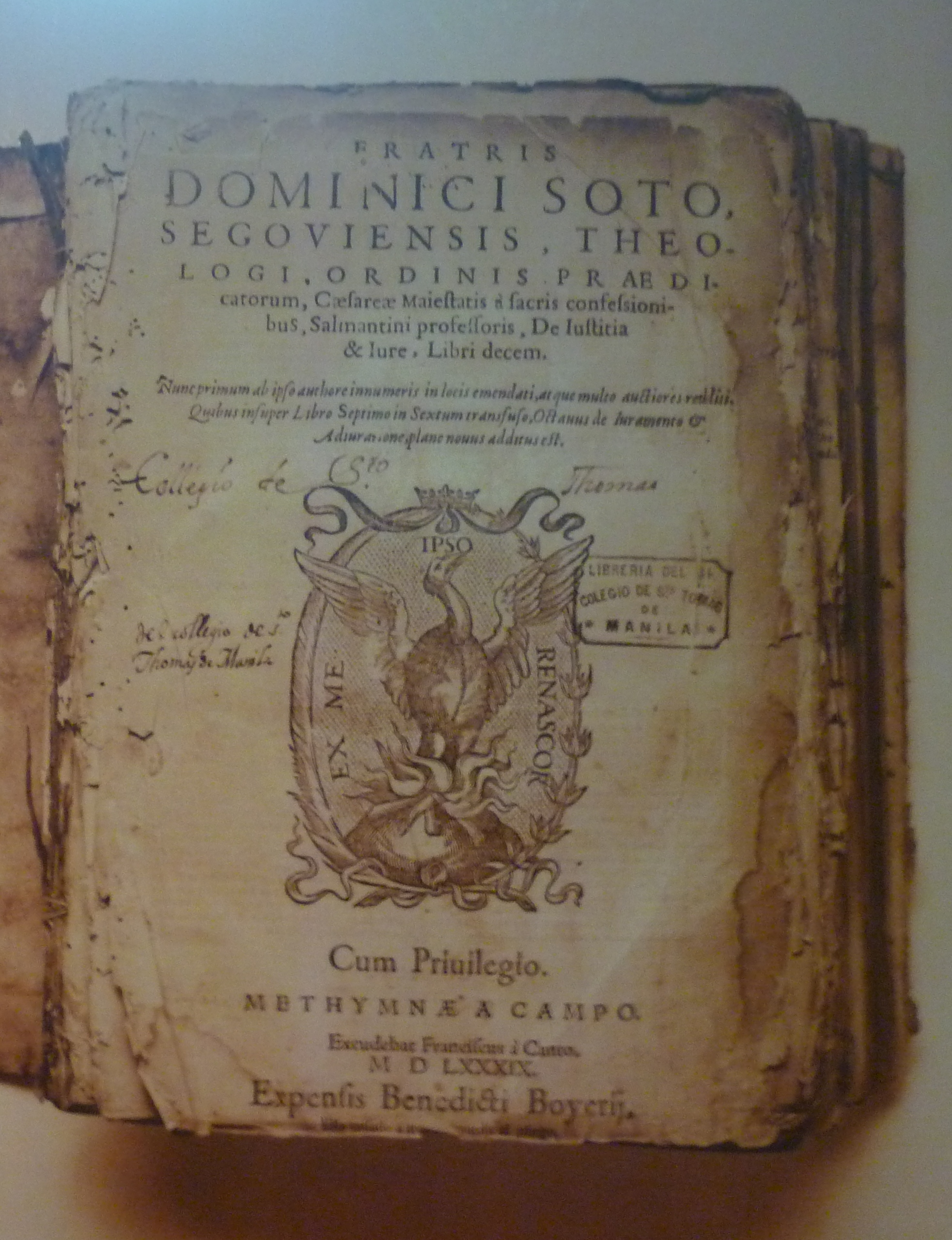
De Iustitia et Iure 1589

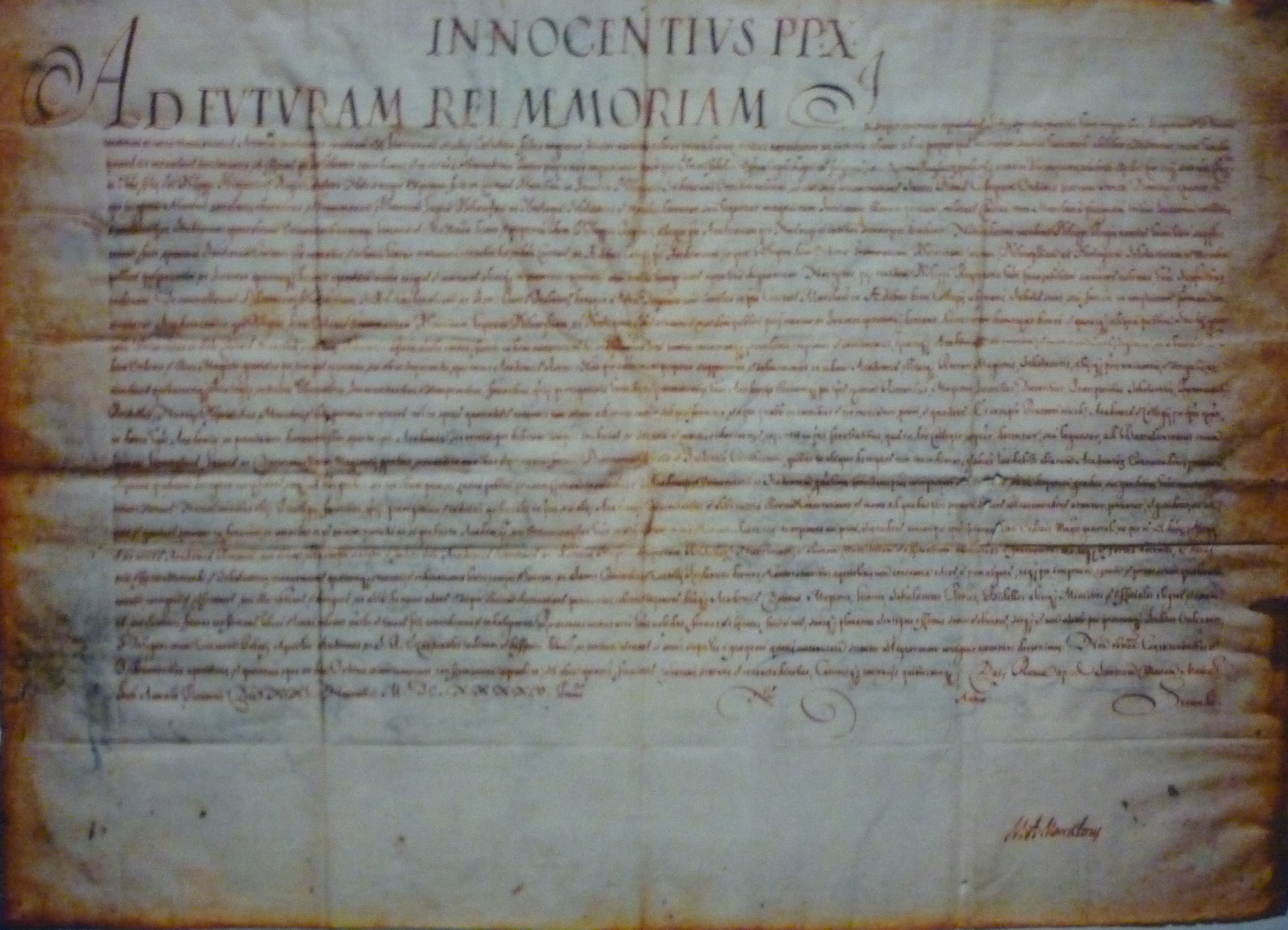
In Supereminenti, 1645

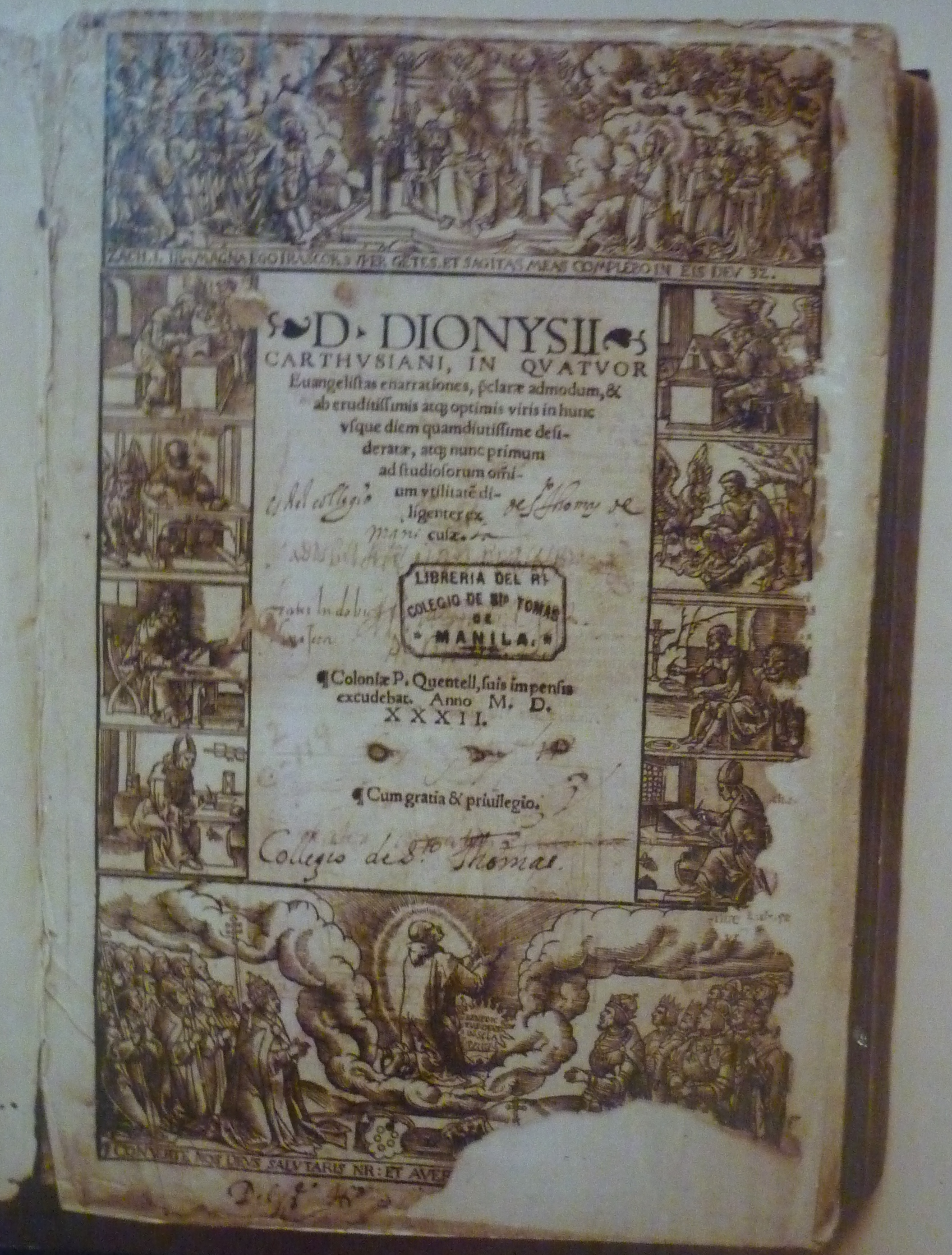
In Quatuor Evangelistas Enarrationes, 1532

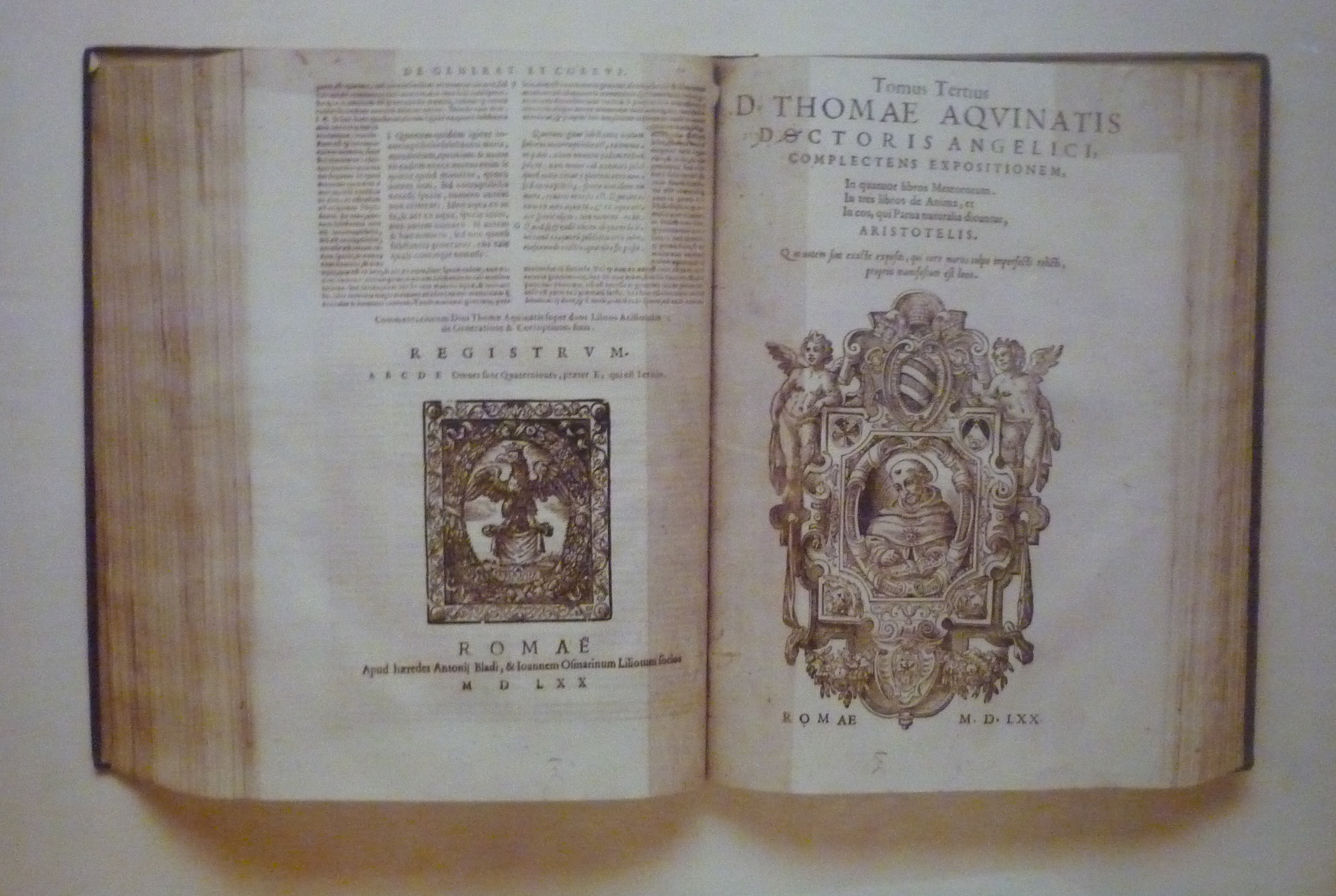
Expositio in Primam Seccundae Angelici 1580

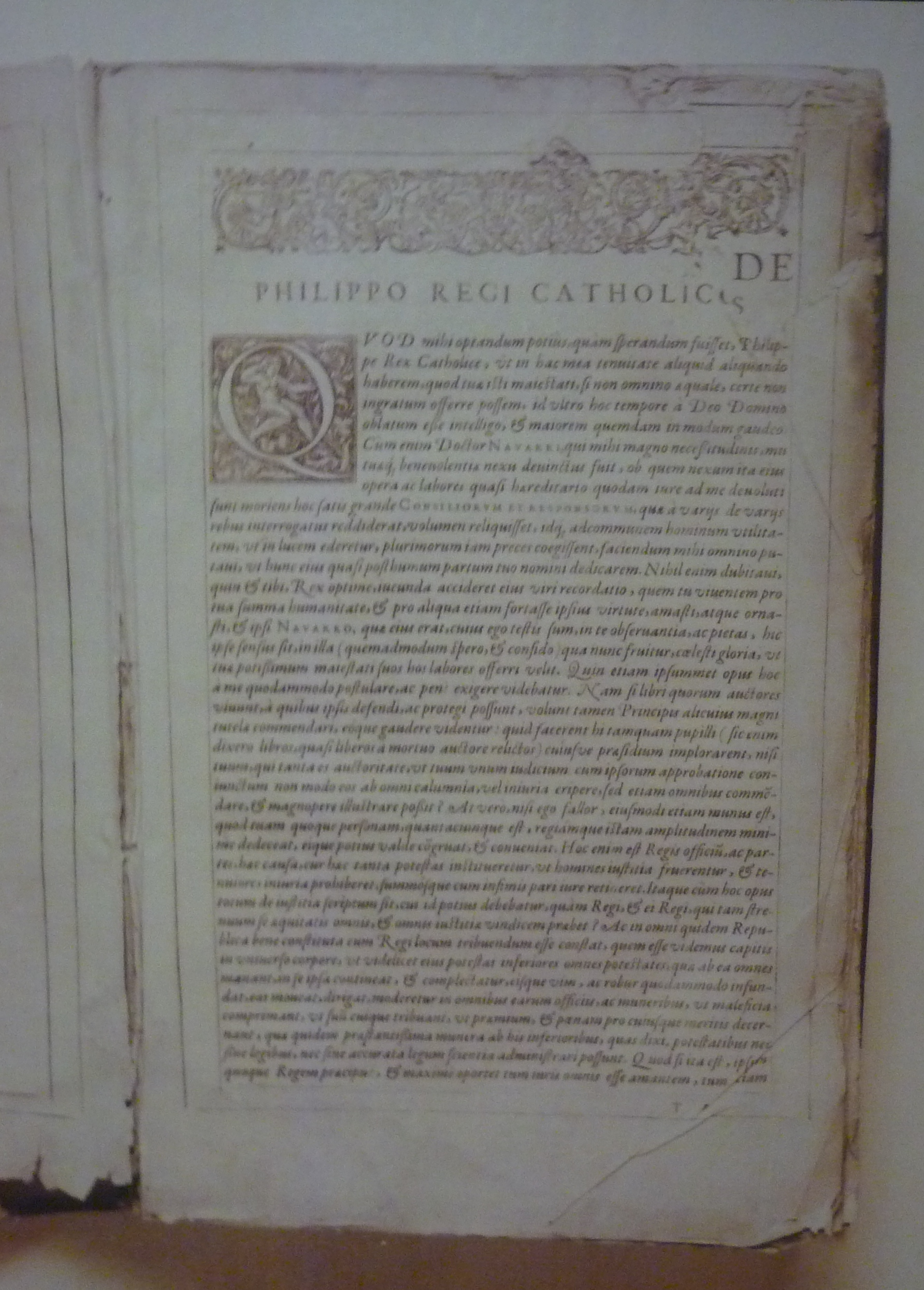
Consiliorum et Responsorum Libri Quinque, 1591

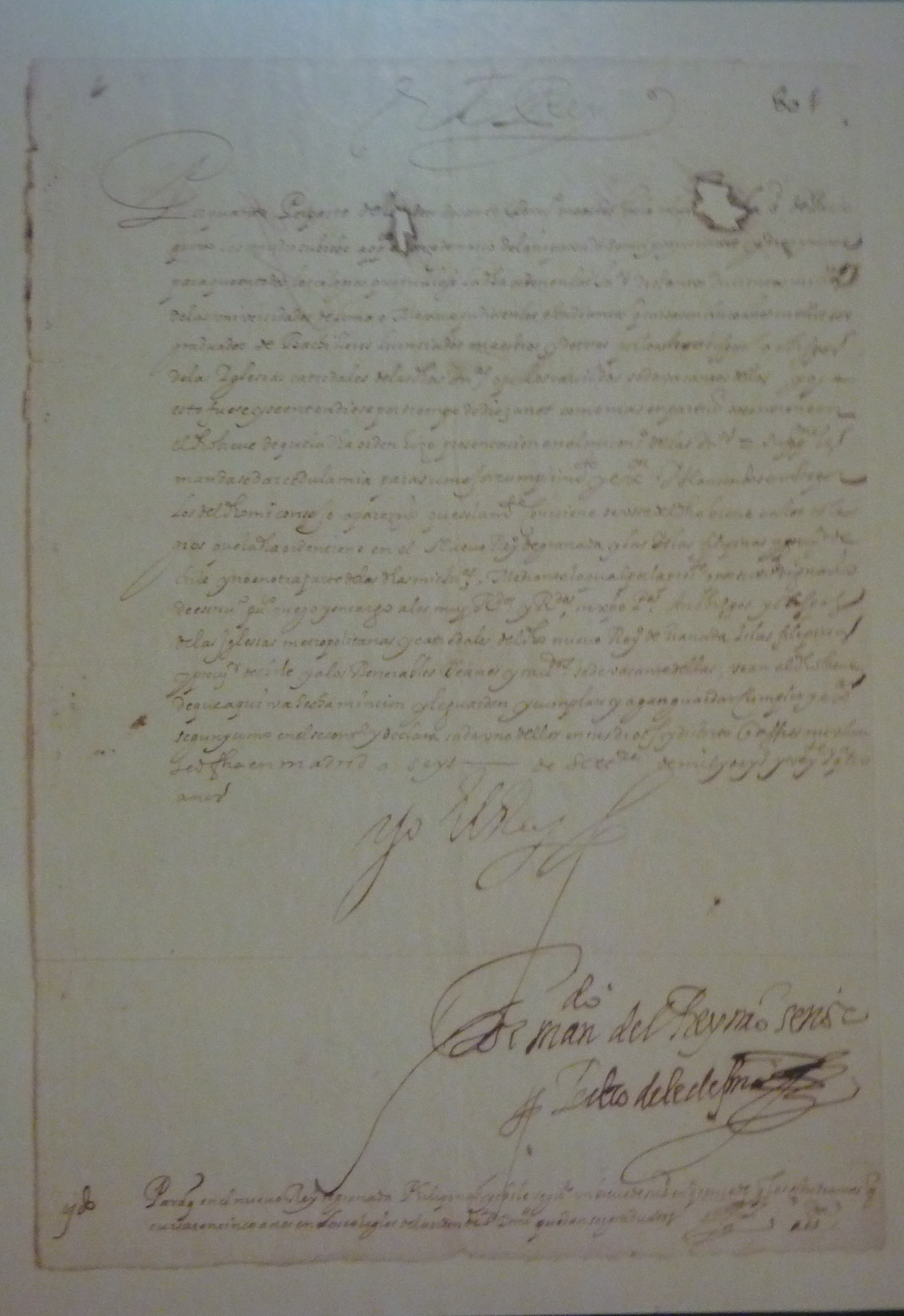
Cedula Real de Santo Tomas, 1624

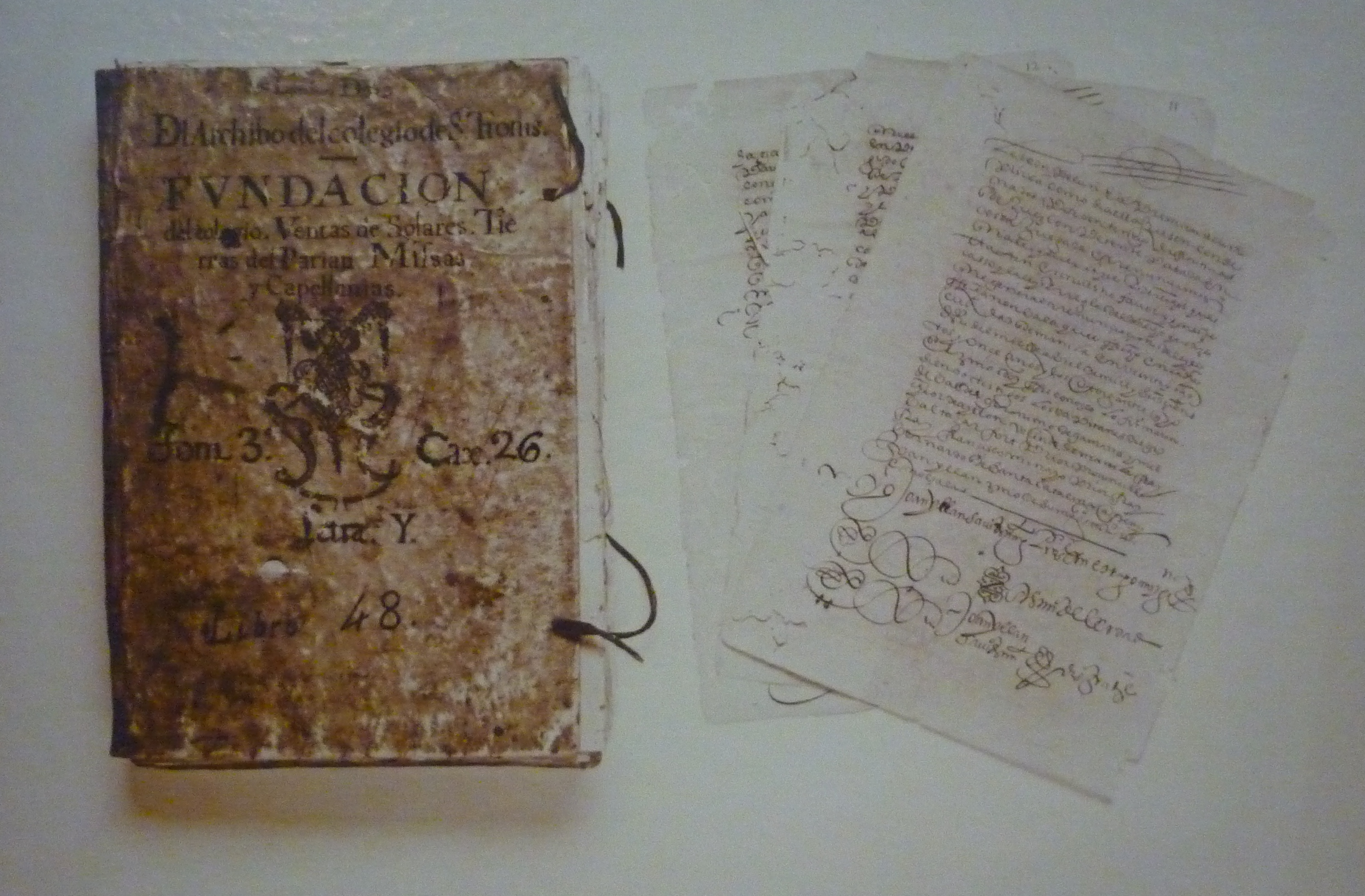
Acta Fundacion de Santo Tomas, 1611

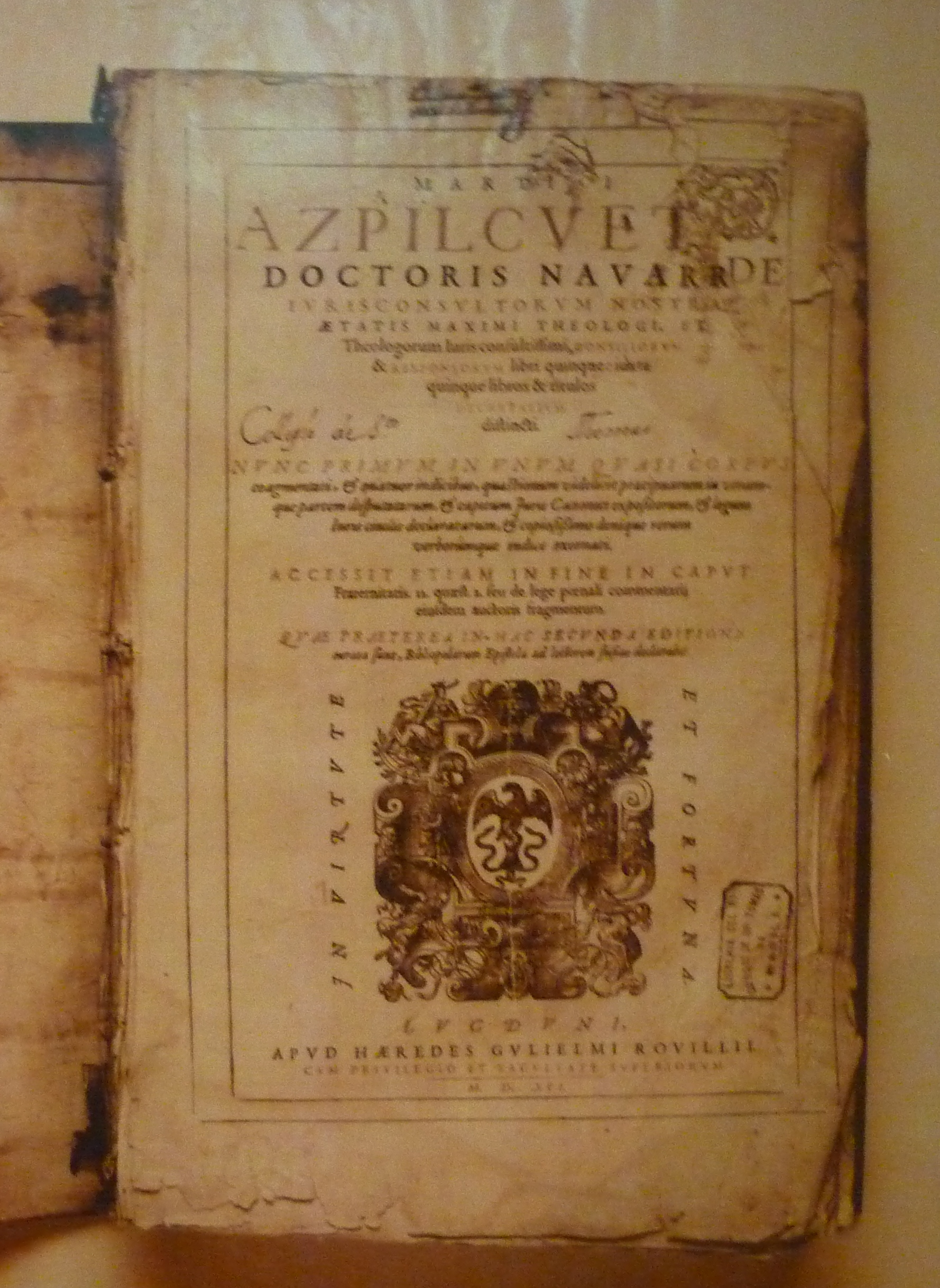
Consiliorum et Responsorum, 1591
