= Pedro Chirino =

Spanish Jesuit missionary and historian (1557–1635)

Pedro Chirino, SJ (born 1557 in Osuna, Andalusia – died 16 September 1635 in Manila, Philippines) was a Spanish priest and historian who served as a Jesuit missionary in the Philippines. He is most remembered for his work, Relación de las Islas Filipinas (1604), one of the earliest works about the Philippines and its people that was written.

== Biography ==
He was born in 1557 in Spain. A graduate in both civil and canon laws at Sevilla, he entered the Society of Jesus at age 23. He was soon appointed to the mission in the Philippines, arriving in the country in 1590 along with Gomez Perez Dasmariñas, the newly-appointed governor-general of the Philippines.

He was first assigned to Balayan before he was appointed to be the parish priest of the town of Taytay in 1591. During his tenure as parish priest, he transferred the location of Taytay parish from its original site near Laguna de Bay to a hilltop area where it has remained to this day. He also began to immerse himself in the study of the Tagalog language and was able to preach his homily in Tagalog for the first time on 15 August 1591 on the occasion of the establishment of a Jesuit mission in Antipolo.

Chirino also went to missions in Tigbauan from February 1593 to April 1595 and Leyte in June 1595. It was in Tigbauan where Father Chirino established in 1593 what would become the first Jesuit boarding-school in the Philippines.

In the course of his missionary work, Father Chirino also recorded the transition of Filipino writing from the Baybayin script to the Latin alphabet. In addition, he began writing down his knowledge of Philippine history as well as his observations on the way of life of Filipinos in that period. Upon his return to Europe in 1602, he worked on the publication of these writings into a book entitled Relación de las Islas Filipinas. The book was eventually published in Rome in 1604.

In Europe, he was able to further establish the Jesuit mission in the Philippines at both the royal and pontifical courts. Through his efforts, he was able to obtain a decree from the Superior General of the Society of Jesus, elevating the Philippine mission to the status of vice-province, independent of the province of Mexico.

Father Chirino returned to the Philippines in 1606 and continued writing about the Philippines; many of these writings have yet to be published. He died in 1635.
