= Miguel de Benavides Library =

University library in Manila, Philippines

- 14°36′39″N 120°59′18″E
- Location: UST Central Library Building, University of Santo Tomas; Sampaloc, Manila, Philippines
- Type: Academic library
- Established: July 24, 1605
- Branches: 5

Collection
- Items collected: books, papal bulls, royal decrees, journals, newspapers, magazines, maps, atlases, microforms, manuscripts
- Size: 300,000+ volumes

Other information
- Website: library.ust.edu.ph

The Miguel de Benavides Library, also known as the University of Santo Tomas Library, is the main academic library of the University of Santo Tomas. The library has been in continuous service and its collection antedates the existence of the university itself.

== History ==
The initial collection of the University of Santo Tomas's (UST) library came from donations; specifically from the private collections of the institution's founder, Fr. Miguel de Benavides and other benefactors including Fr. Diego Soria and Hernando de Los Rios Coronel. Other members of the Dominican Order also donated books concerning priesthood.

UST's academic library was founded on July 24, 1605, which makes it 6 years older than the university itself. It was originally hosted inside the University Building in UST's original campus in Intramuros and later establish presence in other buildings within the campus. Following the destruction of the Intramuros campus, the library moved in to the Main Building at the university's new campus in Sampaloc, Manila.

The library moved in to a dedicated building in 1989. On October 29, 1989, the UST Central Library Building was inaugurated.

The UST Central Library adopted its current name in 2008 in honor of Miguel de Benavides.

== Collection ==
The Miguel de Benavides Library hosts centuries-old publications some of which are accessible online through the UST Digital Library. The library is also in possession of the UST Baybayin Documents, two documents written in baybayin script, which has been declared as a National Cultural Treasure by the National Archives of the Philippines in 2014.

The Antonio Vivencio del Rosario UST Heritage Library, a section at the main library, houses over 30,000 ancient volumes published between 1492 and 1900. It is the largest, oldest, and best-preserved collection of ancient books in the Philippines. It is named after Antonio Vivencio del Rosario, a former secretary general of the university (1854–1866). The heritage library collections include La Guerra Judaica (1492) by Josephus Flavius, De revolutionibus orbium coelestium (1543) of Nicolaus Copernicus, Doctrina Christiana (1593), and the first edition printed copies of Noli Me Tangere and El Filibusterismo of José Rizal.

In collaboration with Unionbank, the library was able to conserve, digitize, and publish the university collections.

The Esquinita de Quijano de Manila, a reading section at the humanities section of the library, holds the book collection of Nick Joaquin. Joaquin's personal library, which contains 3,000 books, was donated to the university in 2005.

== Gallery ==
The facade of the UST Central Library building

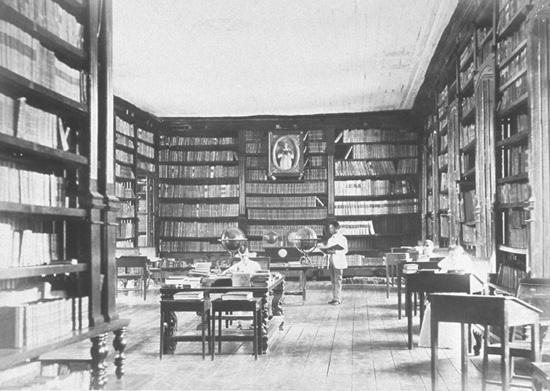
Library of the Santo Tomás University in Manila, 1887

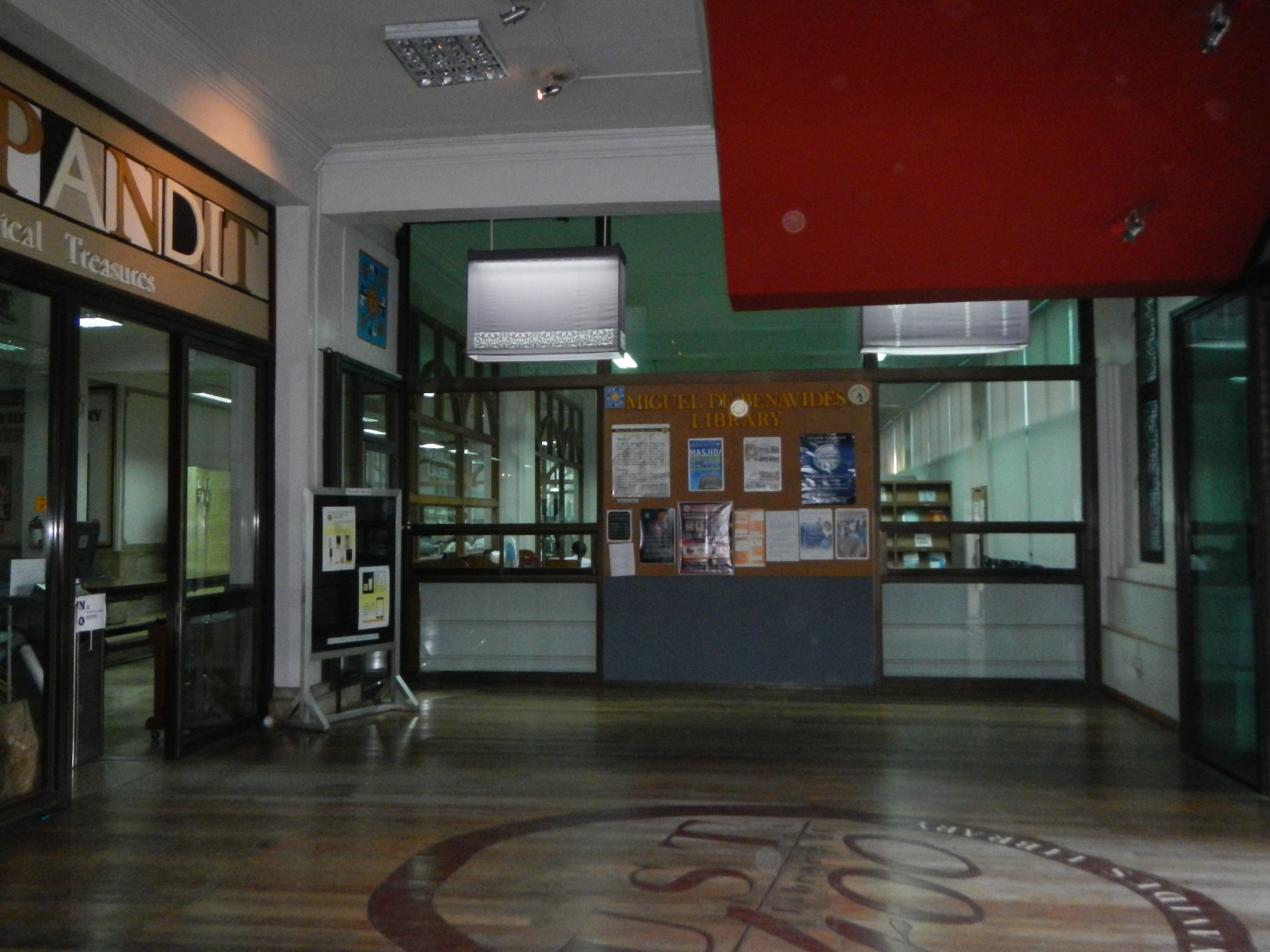
Hallway

Miguel de Benavides Library at dusk
