= Tagalog (Unicode block) =

- Range: U+1700..U+171F (32 code points)
- Plane: BMP
- Scripts: Tagalog
- Major alphabets: Baybayin
- Assigned: 23 code points
- Unused: 9 reserved code points

Unicode version history
- 3.2 (2002): 20 (+20)
- 14.0 (2021): 23 (+3)

Unicode documentation
- Code chart ∣ Web page

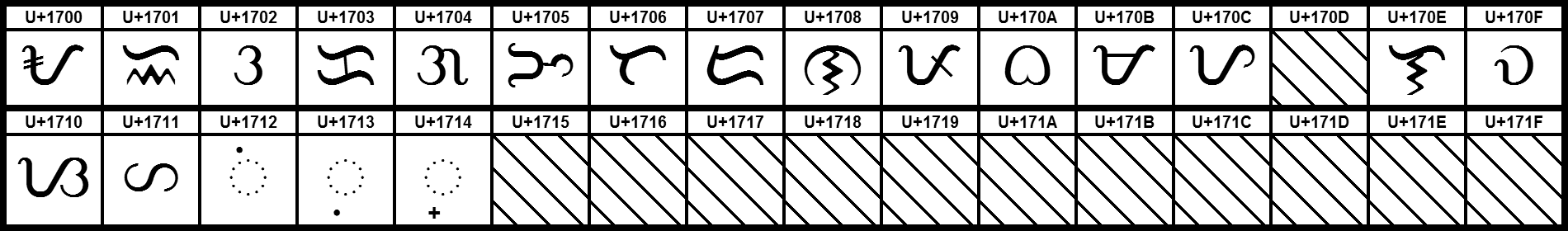
Graphical representation of the Tagalog Unicode block

Tagalog is a Unicode block containing characters of the Baybayin script, specifically the variety used for writing the Tagalog language before and during Spanish colonization of the Philippines eventually led to the adoption of the Latin alphabet. It has been a part of the Unicode Standard since version 3.2 in April 2002. Tagalog characters can be found in the Noto Sans Tagalog font, among others. The Tagalog Baybayin script was originally proposed for inclusion in Unicode alongside its descendant Hanunoo, Buhid and Tagbanwa scripts as a single block called "Philippine Scripts" and two punctuation marks are only part of the Hanunoo block. In 2021, with version 14.0, the Unicode Standard was updated to add three new characters: the "ra" and archaic "ra", and the pamudpod.

Tagalog^{[1]}^{[2]} Official Unicode Consortium code chart (PDF)
	0	1	2	3	4	5	6	7	8	9	A	B	C	D	E	F
U+170x	ᜀ	ᜁ	ᜂ	ᜃ	ᜄ	ᜅ	ᜆ	ᜇ	ᜈ	ᜉ	ᜊ	ᜋ	ᜌ	ᜍ	ᜎ	ᜏ
U+171x	ᜐ	ᜑ	ᜒ	ᜓ	᜔	᜕										ᜟ
Notes 1.As of Unicode version 17.0 2.Grey areas indicate non-assigned code points

== History ==
The following Unicode-related documents record the purpose and process of defining specific characters in the Tagalog block:

Version	Final code points (Note: Proposed code points and characters names may differ from final code points and names)	Count	L2 ID	WG2 ID	Document
3.2	U+1700..170C, 170E..1714	20	L2/98-217	N1755 (pdf, Attach)	Everson, Michael (1998-05-25), Proposal for encoding the Philippine scripts in the BMP of ISO/IEC 10646
3.2	U+1700..170C, 170E..1714	20	L2/98-397		Everson, Michael (1998-11-23), Revised proposal for encoding the Philippine scripts in the UCS
3.2	U+1700..170C, 170E..1714	20	L2/99-014	N1933	Everson, Michael (1998-11-23), Revised proposal for encoding the Philippine scripts in the UCS
3.2	U+1700..170C, 170E..1714	20	L2/98-419 (pdf, doc)		Aliprand, Joan (1999-02-05), "Philippine Scripts", Approved Minutes -- UTC #78 & NCITS Subgroup L2 # 175 Joint Meeting, San Jose, CA -- December 1-4, 1998, "[#78-M8] Motion:To accept document L2/98-397, Revised proposal for encoding Philippine scripts, for addition to the Unicode Standard after Version 3.0."
3.2	U+1700..170C, 170E..1714	20	L2/99-232	N2003	Umamaheswaran, V. S. (1999-08-03), "9.4.1", Minutes of WG 2 meeting 36, Fukuoka, Japan, 1999-03-09--15
3.2	U+1700..170C, 170E..1714	20	L2/00-097	N2194	Sato, T. K. (2000-02-22), Philippino characters (status report)
3.2	U+1700..170C, 170E..1714	20	L2/00-357		Everson, Michael (2000-10-16), Philippine Scripts (draft block description)
3.2	U+1700..170C, 170E..1714	20	L2/01-050	N2253	Umamaheswaran, V. S. (2001-01-21), "7.14 Philippine scripts", Minutes of the SC2/WG2 meeting in Athens, September 2000
14.0	U+170D, 171F	2	L2/19-258R		Brennan, Fredrick R. (2019-07-18), The baybayin "ra", its origins and a plea for its formal recognition
14.0	U+170D, 171F	2	L2/19-286		Anderson, Deborah; Whistler, Ken; Pournader, Roozbeh; Moore, Lisa; Liang, Hai (2019-07-22), "12. Tagalog", Recommendations to UTC #160 July 2019 on Script Proposals
14.0	U+170D, 171F	2	L2/19-270		Moore, Lisa (2019-10-07), "Consensus 160-C24", UTC #160 Minutes
14.0	U+1715	1	L2/20-257		Brennan, Fredrick R. (2020-09-23), "18 Tagalog and Hanunoo", Please reclassify the Philippine pamudpod
14.0	U+1715	1	L2/20-250		Anderson, Deborah; Whistler, Ken; Pournader, Roozbeh; Moore, Lisa; Constable, Peter; Liang, Hai (2020-10-01), "14. Hanunoo / Tagalog", Recommendations to UTC #165 October 2020 on Script Proposals
14.0	U+1715	1	L2/20-272		Brennan, Fredrick R. (2020-10-03), Amended proposal to encode the Tagalog pamudpod
14.0	U+1715	1	L2/20-237		Moore, Lisa (2020-10-27), "Consensus 165-C18", UTC #165 Minutes
14.0	U+1715	1	L2/21-117		Pournader, Roozbeh (2021-05-20), Pamudpod properties (Tagalog and Hanunoo)
14.0	U+1715	1	L2/21-130		Anderson, Deborah; Whistler, Ken; Pournader, Roozbeh; Liang, Hai (2021-07-26), "18 Tagalog and Hanunoo", Recommendations to UTC #168 July 2021 on Script Proposals
14.0	U+1715	1	L2/21-123		Cummings, Craig (2021-08-03), "Consensus 168-C29", Draft Minutes of UTC Meeting 168
