= Baybayin =

Ancient Philippine writing system

Baybayin ᜊᜌ᜔ᜊᜌᜒᜈ᜔
- Tagalog script ("Sulat Tagalog"), based on traditional rules and handwritten UST Baybayin Documents, with accurate syllable-to-character mapping
- Script type: Abugida
- Period: c. 1300–present
- Direction: Left-to-right
- Languages: Tagalog, Bisayan languages, Sambali, Ilocano, Kapampangan, Bikol, Pangasinan, Sanskrit

Related scripts
- Parent systems: Egyptian hieroglyphs: Proto-Sinaitic; Phoenician; Aramaic; Brahmi; Tamil-Brahmi; Pallava; Kawi; Baybayin
- Child systems: Buhid; Hanuno; Kulitan; Tagbanwa
- Sister systems: Balinese; Batak; Javanese; Lontara; Makasar; Sundanese; Ulu; Rejang

ISO 15924
- ISO 15924: Tglg (370), Tagalog (Baybayin, Alibata)

Unicode
- Unicode alias: Tagalog
- Unicode range: U+1700–U+171F

Baybayin (ᜊᜌ᜔ᜊᜌᜒᜈ᜔, (Note: Spelling with the cross-shaped virama (krus-kudlit). The spelling without any virama is ᜊᜊᜌᜒ and with the pamudpod is ᜊᜌ᜕ᜊᜌᜒᜈ᜕.) Tagalog pronunciation: [baɪˈbajɪn]), also sometimes erroneously referred to as alibata, is a Philippine script that was widely used in Luzon during and prior to the 16th and 17th centuries. It was utilized primarily to write Tagalog, and to a lesser extent, Visayan languages, Kapampangan, Ilocano, and several other Philippine languages.

Baybayin is an abugida belonging to the family of the Brahmic scripts. Its use was gradually replaced by the Latin alphabet during Spanish rule, though it has seen limited modern usage in the Philippines. The script is encoded in Unicode as Tagalog block since 2002 alongside Buhid, Hanunoo, and Tagbanwa scripts. The Archives of the University of Santo Tomas in Manila holds the largest collection of extant writings using Baybayin.

Baybayin has seen a rise in modern usage, primarily for cultural and artistic purposes, including in visual arts, literature, tattoos, and logos. It is also featured on the logos of government agencies, Philippine banknotes, and passports. Additionally, there are educational initiatives and workshops aimed at teaching Baybayin to a new generation. Social media has also been instrumental in the increased awareness and interest in Baybayin. Artists, educators, and enthusiasts use these platforms to share tutorials, artworks, and historical facts about the script, sparking interest among younger generations. Bills to recognize the script and revive its use alongside the Latin alphabet have been repeatedly considered by the Congress.

== Terminology ==
Baybayin comes from the Tagalog root word baybay, which means "spelling". The first attested use of the term to refer to a writing system is from the 1613 Tagalog dictionary Vocabulario de la lengua tagala by the Spanish priest Pedro San Buenaventura. There, the word was recorded as baibayin. Early Spanish accounts commonly referred to baybayin as “Tagalog letters” or “Tagalog writing.” Additionally, it was referred to as sulat Tagalog by the heads of the communities in the attestation of Pacaen de Mayoboc (1681).

While the Philippine script is most widely known today as baybayin, it is not a single uniform alphabet, but rather a family of closely related regional variants. Because different ethnic groups used the same writing system, it was known by various local names and stylized according to regional languages. For instance, it was called basahan among the Bicolanos, kulitan (or kulit) among the Kapampangan, kurditan (or kur-itan) among the Ilocanos, and badlit among the Visayans. These terms generally refer to the local manner of writing or the characters themselves, rather than entirely separate scripts.

Historically, the term alibata was used synonymously with Baybayin. Alibata is a neologism first coined in 1914, possibly under the false assumption that the script was derived from the Arabic script, hence the name. Most modern scholars reject the use of the word alibata as incorrect.

== Characteristics ==
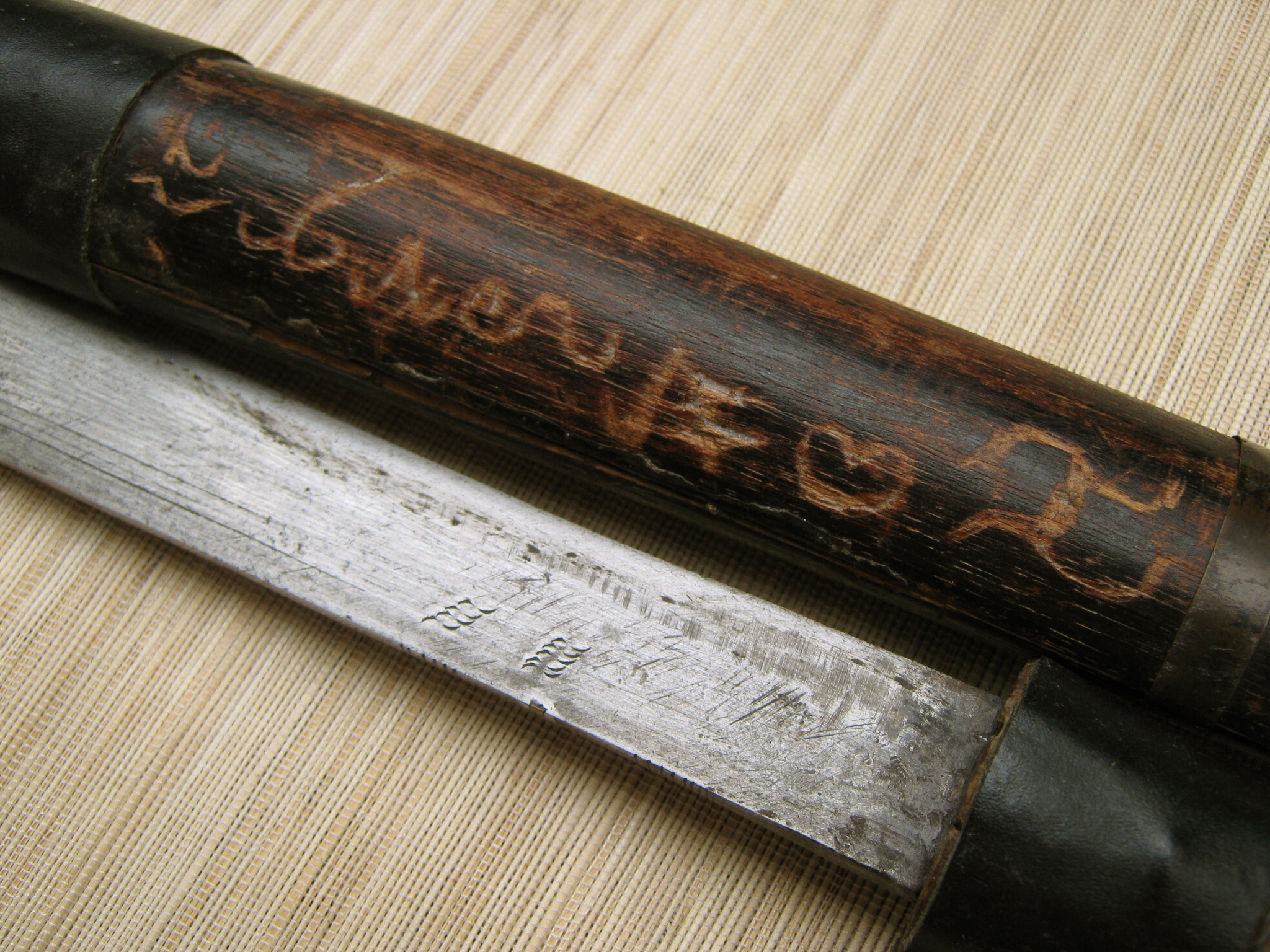
A Filipino dha scabbard inscribed with baybayin characters

=== Letters ===
Baybayin has 17 letters, or titik in Tagalog. There are 3 vowels, or patinig, and 14 consonants, or katinig. Each consonant is inherently pronounced with a vowel sound – specifically /a/ – making baybayin an abugida. The phonemes /e/ and /i/ share one character, ⟨ᜁ⟩. The same applies to /o/ and /u/, symbolized by the character ⟨ᜂ⟩; and /da/ and /ra/, symbolized by the character ⟨ᜇ⟩.

The character ⟨ᜟ⟩, although not in traditional baybayin, is sometimes used to represent /ra/. Purportedly, it originates from the archaic writing system of the Sambal people in Zambales province. The connection was made in 1895 by the Augustinian friar Cipriano Marcilla y Martín, who said that the letter was documented in a 1601 Spanish manuscript. The Dominican friar Evergisto Bazaco wrote that the letter was likely introduced by missionaries instead of being native to the Sambal. Despite this, this character isn't commonly learned and used in any settings.

=== Diacritics ===
To change the inherent vowel of a given consonant, a diacritic mark called kudlit is placed either above or below the letter. Placing it above changes the /a/ to an /e/ or /i/, and placing it below changes the /a/ to an /o/ or /u/.

One kudlit, ⟨◌᜔⟩, called sabat or krus, a virama removes a consonant's inherent a vowel, making it an independent consonant. The krus-kudlít virama was added to the original script by the Spanish priest Francisco López in 1620. Later, the pamudpod virama ⟨◌᜕⟩, which has the same function, was added. Besides these phonetic considerations, the script is unicase and does not use letter cases to distinguish proper names or the start of sentences.

Vowels and viramas
ᜀ a	ᜁ i or e	ᜂ o or u		
	◌̇ i or e	◌̣ o or u	◌᜔ krus-kudlít	◌᜕ pamudpod

The base characters with all consonant–vowel and virama combinations
ᜃ ka	ᜄ ga	ᜅ nga	ᜆ ta	ᜇ da (Note: Originally, there was only one symbol, or character, for da and ra, as they were allophones in many languages of the Philippines; ra occurred in intervocalic positions and da elsewhere. Regional Baybayin variants such as Sambal, Basahan, and Ibalnan do have separate symbols for da and ra, as does Modern Baybayin (the Sambal or Zambales ra is ᜟ, while the modern ra is ᜍ, with the modern one being derived from ᜇ). At least in traditional and most modern variants of Baybayin, shared symbols are also used to represent both pa and fa, ba and va, and sa and za, which were also allophonic. Note that some "post-modern" variants have invented characters for fa, va, and za, among others.)	ᜈ na	ᜉ pa, fa	ᜊ ba, va	ᜋ ma	ᜌ ya	ᜍ ra (Note: Sometimes used in modern settings, not commonly taught or used. In this article, we are not using this character for consistency.)	ᜎ la	ᜏ wa	ᜐ sa, za	ᜑ ha
ᜃ + ◌̇ ᜃᜒ ki, ke	ᜄ + ◌̇ ᜄᜒ gi, ge	ᜅ + ◌̇ ᜅᜒ ngi, nge	ᜆ + ◌̇ ᜆᜒ ti, te	ᜇ + ◌̇ ᜇᜒ di, de	ᜈ + ◌̇ ᜈᜒ ni, ne	ᜉ + ◌̇ ᜉᜒ pi, fi pe, fe	ᜊ + ◌̇ ᜊᜒ bi, vi be, ve	ᜋ + ◌̇ ᜋᜒ mi, me	ᜌ + ◌̇ ᜌᜒ yi, ye	ᜍ + ◌̇ ᜍᜒ ri, re	ᜎ + ◌̇ ᜎᜒ li, le	ᜏ + ◌̇ ᜏᜒ wi, we	ᜐ + ◌̇ ᜐᜒ si, se zi, ze	ᜑ + ◌̇ ᜑᜒ hi, he
ᜃ + ◌̣ ᜃᜓ ko, ku	ᜄ + ◌̣ ᜄᜓ go, gu	ᜅ + ◌̣ ᜅᜓ ngo, ngu	ᜆ + ◌̣ ᜆᜓ to, tu	ᜇ + ◌̣ ᜇᜓ do, du	ᜈ + ◌̣ ᜈᜓ no, nu	ᜉ + ◌̣ ᜉᜓ po, fo pu, fu	ᜊ + ◌̣ ᜊᜓ bo, vo bu, vu	ᜋ + ◌̣ ᜋᜓ mo, mu	ᜌ + ◌̣ ᜌᜓ yo, yu	ᜍ + ◌̣ ᜍᜓ ro, ru	ᜎ + ◌̣ ᜎᜓ lo, lu	ᜏ + ◌̣ ᜏᜓ wo, wu	ᜐ + ◌̣ ᜐᜓ so, zo su, zu	ᜑ + ◌̣ ᜑᜓ ho, hu
ᜃ᜕ ᜃ᜔ IPA: /k/	ᜄ᜕ ᜄ᜔ IPA: /g/	ᜅ᜕ ᜅ᜔ IPA: /ŋ/	ᜆ᜕ ᜆ᜔ IPA: /t/	ᜇ᜕ ᜇ᜔ IPA: /d/	ᜈ᜕ ᜈ᜔ IPA: /n/	ᜉ᜕ ᜉ᜔ IPA: /p/, /f/	ᜊ᜕ ᜊ᜔ IPA: /b/, /v/	ᜋ᜕ ᜋ᜔ IPA: /m/	ᜌ᜕ ᜌ᜔ IPA: /j/	ᜍ᜕ ᜍ᜔ IPA: /r/	ᜎ᜕ ᜎ᜔ IPA: /l/	ᜏ᜕ ᜏ᜔ IPA: /w/	ᜐ᜕ ᜐ᜔ IPA: /s/, /z/	ᜑ᜕ ᜑ᜔ IPA: /h/

=== Punctuation and spacing ===
Baybayin originally used only one punctuation mark (᜶), which was called Bantasán. Today baybayin uses two punctuation marks, the Philippine single (᜵) punctuation, acting as a comma or verse splitter in poetry, and the double punctuation (᜶), acting as a period or end of paragraph. These punctuation marks are similar to single and double danda signs in other Indic abugidas, and may be presented vertically like Indic dandas, or slanted like forward slashes. The signs are unified across the Philippines scripts and were encoded by Unicode in the Hanunóo script block. Space separation of words was historically not used as words were written in a continuous flow, but it is common today after the introduction of other writing systems.

=== Alphabetical order ===
In the Doctrina Christiana, the letters were ordered without any connection with other similar scripts, except for sorting vowels before consonants as:

ᜀ ᜂ ᜁ ᜑ ᜉ ᜃ ᜐ ᜎ ᜆ ᜈ ᜊ ᜋ ᜄ ᜇ ᜌ ᜅ ᜏ
a, u/o, i/e; ha, pa, ka, sa, la, ta, na, ba, ma, ga, da/ra, ya, nga, wa.

In Unicode the letters are ordered in a similar way to other Indic scripts, by phonetic class.

ᜀ ᜁ ᜂ ᜃ ᜄ ᜅ ᜆ ᜇ ᜈ ᜉ ᜊ ᜋ ᜌ ᜍ ᜎ ᜏ ᜐ ᜑ
a, i/e, o/u; ka, ga, nga; ta, da, na; pa, ba, ma; ya, ra, la; wa, sa, ha.

=== Way of writing ===
Historic:, Traditional:, Modern: According to Scott, when the sign for ba has to be read as be / bi, it has a kudlit (a small "v" shaped diacritic sign) on the left (or above), if it has to be read as bu / bo, the kudlit is on the right (resp. below). The ancient characters of Tagalog and Camarines people had its own character for /r/, in contrast to more common modern Baybayin version and Ilokano kurdita. In his time the kaldit was called kaholoan or holo according to Marcos de Lisboa, author of the earliest dictionary of Bikol.

According to Lisboa, writing for old Bikolnons started from the bottom up, writing to the right. However, some scholars such as Ignacio Villamor who have studied the basahan of pre-Hispanic Filipinos strongly emphasize that they all wrote texts in a straight line starting from left to right, then returning to the left at the beginning and keep writing right.

== History ==
The precise origins of baybayin are not well-defined. Precolonial evidence of indigenous communication practices is scant because few written records from the time period have survived. This is because cultural and historical information were, instead, generally preserved orally.

=== Brahmi origins ===
Despite the writing system's unclear origins, scholars agree that baybayin, like all other abugida scripts of Southeast Asia, ultimately descends from the Brahmi script of ancient India. This was made possible by the indirect Indianization of the Philippines during the archipelago's precolonial period. Various aspects of Indian languages were introduced to the Philippines likely through Indonesia to the south, where writing systems related to baybayin – like the Kawi script – were used.

Indosphere

Isaac Taylor sought to show that baybayin was introduced into the Philippines from the Coast of Bengal sometime before the 8th century. In attempting to show such a relationship, Taylor presented graphic representations of Kistna and Assam letters like g, k, ng, t, m, h, and u, which resemble the same letters in baybayin. Fletcher Gardner argued that the Philippine scripts had "very great similarity" with the Brahmi script, which was supported by T. H. Pardo de Tavera. According to Christopher Miller, evidence seems strong for baybayin to be ultimately of Gujarati origin; however, Philippine and Gujarati languages have final consonants, so it is unlikely that their indication would have been dropped had baybayin been based directly on a Gujarati model.

==== Kawi ====
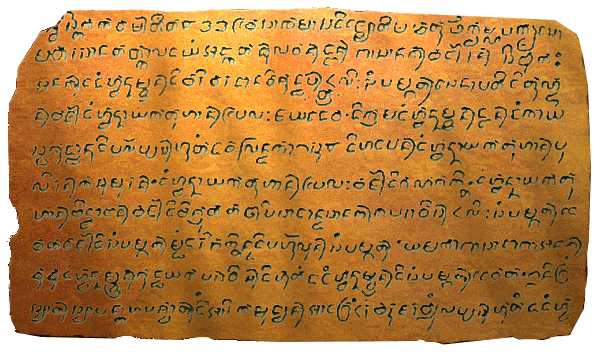
The Laguna Copperplate Inscription.

The Kawi script originated in Java, descending from the Pallava script, and was used across much of Maritime Southeast Asia. The Laguna Copperplate Inscription is the earliest-known written document found in the Philippines. It is a legal document with the inscribed date of Saka Era 822, corresponding in the Proleptic Gregorian Calendar to 21 April 900 AD. It was written in the Kawi script in a variety of Old Malay containing numerous loanwords from Sanskrit and a few non-Malay vocabulary elements whose origin is ambiguous between Old Javanese and Old Tagalog. A second example of Kawi script can be seen on the Butuan Ivory Seal, found in the 1970s and dated between the 9th and 12th centuries. It is an ancient seal made of ivory that was found in an archaeological site in Butuan, inscribed with the word Butwan in stylized Kawi, and now in the National Museum of the Philippines. One hypothesis therefore reasons that, since Kawi is the earliest attestation of writing in the Philippines, then baybayin may have descended from Kawi.

==== South Sulawesi scripts ====
David Diringer, accepting the view that the scripts of the Malay Archipelago originate in India, writes that the South Sulawesi scripts derive from the Kawi script, probably through the medium of the Batak script of Sumatra. The Philippine scripts, according to Diringer, were possibly brought to the Philippines through the Buginese characters in Sulawesi. According to Scott, baybayin's immediate ancestor was very likely a South Sulawesi script, probably Old Makassar or a close ancestor. This is because of the lack of final consonants or vowel canceler markers in baybayin. South Sulawesi languages have a restricted inventory of syllable-final consonants and do not represent them in the Bugis and Makassar scripts. The most likely explanation for the absence of final consonant markers in baybayin is therefore that its direct ancestor was a South Sulawesi script. Sulawesi lies directly to the south of the Philippines and there is evidence of trade routes between the two. Baybayin must therefore have been developed in the Philippines in the fifteenth century CE as the Bugis-Makassar script was developed in South Sulawesi no earlier than 1400 CE.

==== Cham script ====
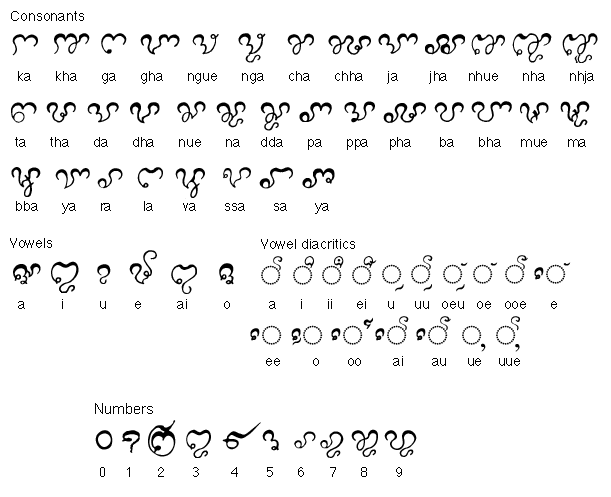
The Eastern Cham script

Baybayin could have been introduced to the Philippines by maritime connections with the Champa Kingdom. Geoff Wade has argued that the baybayin characters "ga", "nga", "pa", "ma", "ya", and "sa" display characteristics that can be best explained by linking them to the Cham script, rather than other Indic abugidas. According to Wade, Baybayin seems to be more related to other Southeast Asian scripts than to the Kawi script. Wade argues that the Laguna Copperplate Inscription is not definitive proof for a Kawi origin of baybayin, as the inscription displays final consonants, which baybayin does not.

=== Early history ===
From the available material, it is clear that baybayin was used in Luzon, Palawan, Mindoro, Pangasinan, Ilocos, Panay, Leyte and Iloilo, but there is no proof supporting that baybayin reached Mindanao. It appears that the Luzon and Palawan varieties started to develop in different ways in the 1500s, before the Spaniards conquered what we know today as the Philippines. This puts Luzon and Palawan as the oldest regions where baybayin was and is used. It is also notable that the script used in Pampanga had already developed special shapes for the four letters by the early 1600s, different from the ones used elsewhere. There were three somewhat distinct varieties of baybayin in the late 1500s and 1600s, though they could not be described as three different scripts any more than the different styles of Latin script across medieval or modern Europe, with their slightly different sets of letters and spelling systems.

Some handwritten samples of baybayin
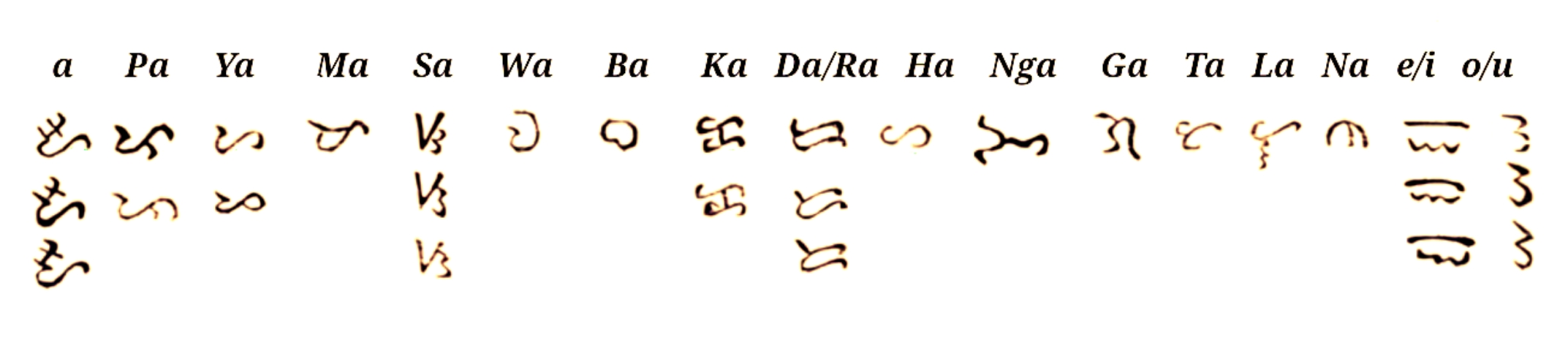
Characters based on the typography of Plasencia’s 1593 Doctrina Christiana

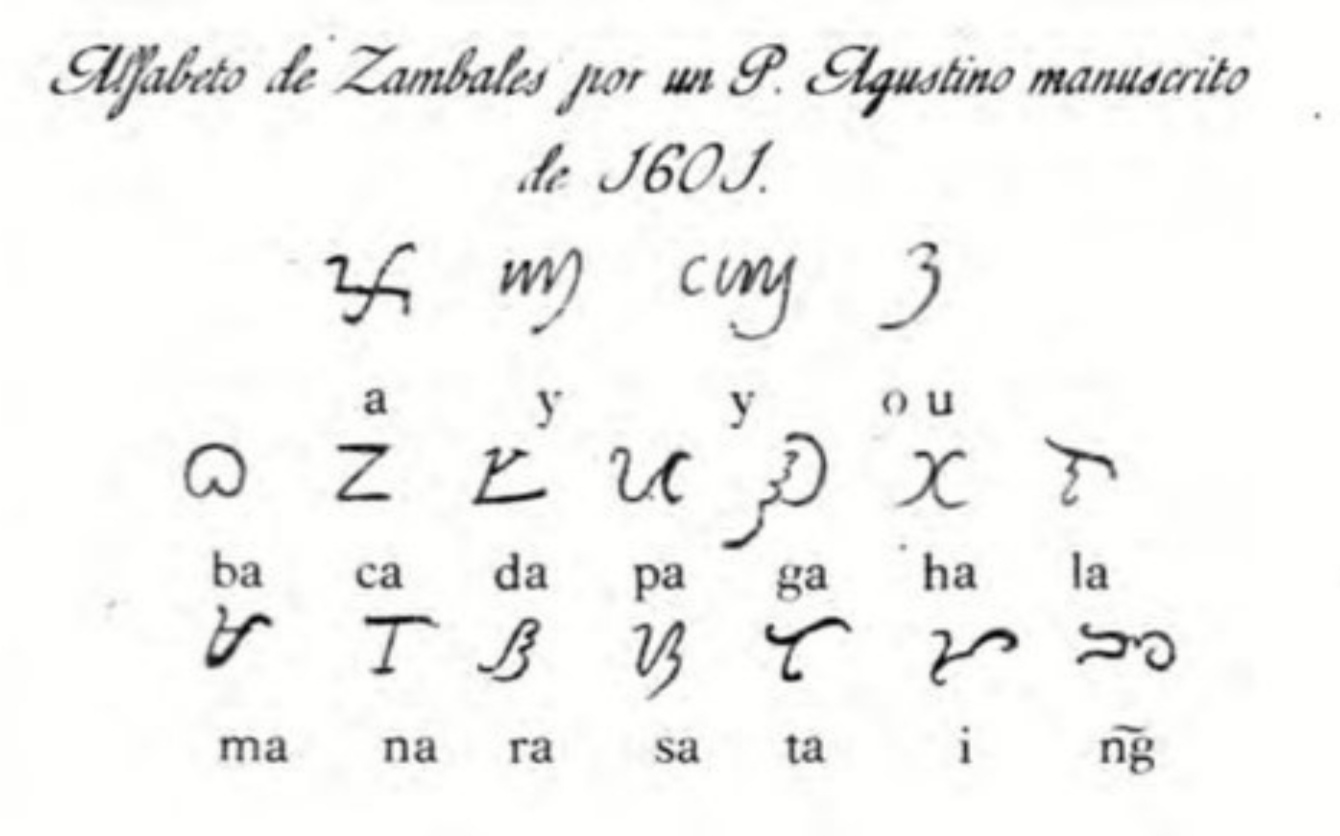
Baybayin characters found in Zambales

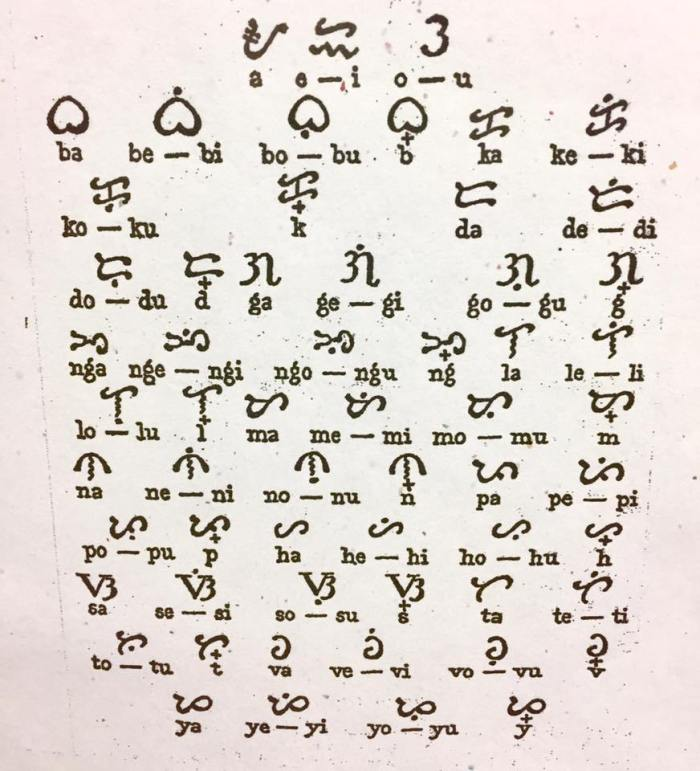
Characters based on the typography used in the Ilocano 1620 work, Libro a Naisuratan amin ti bagas ti Doctrina Cristiana

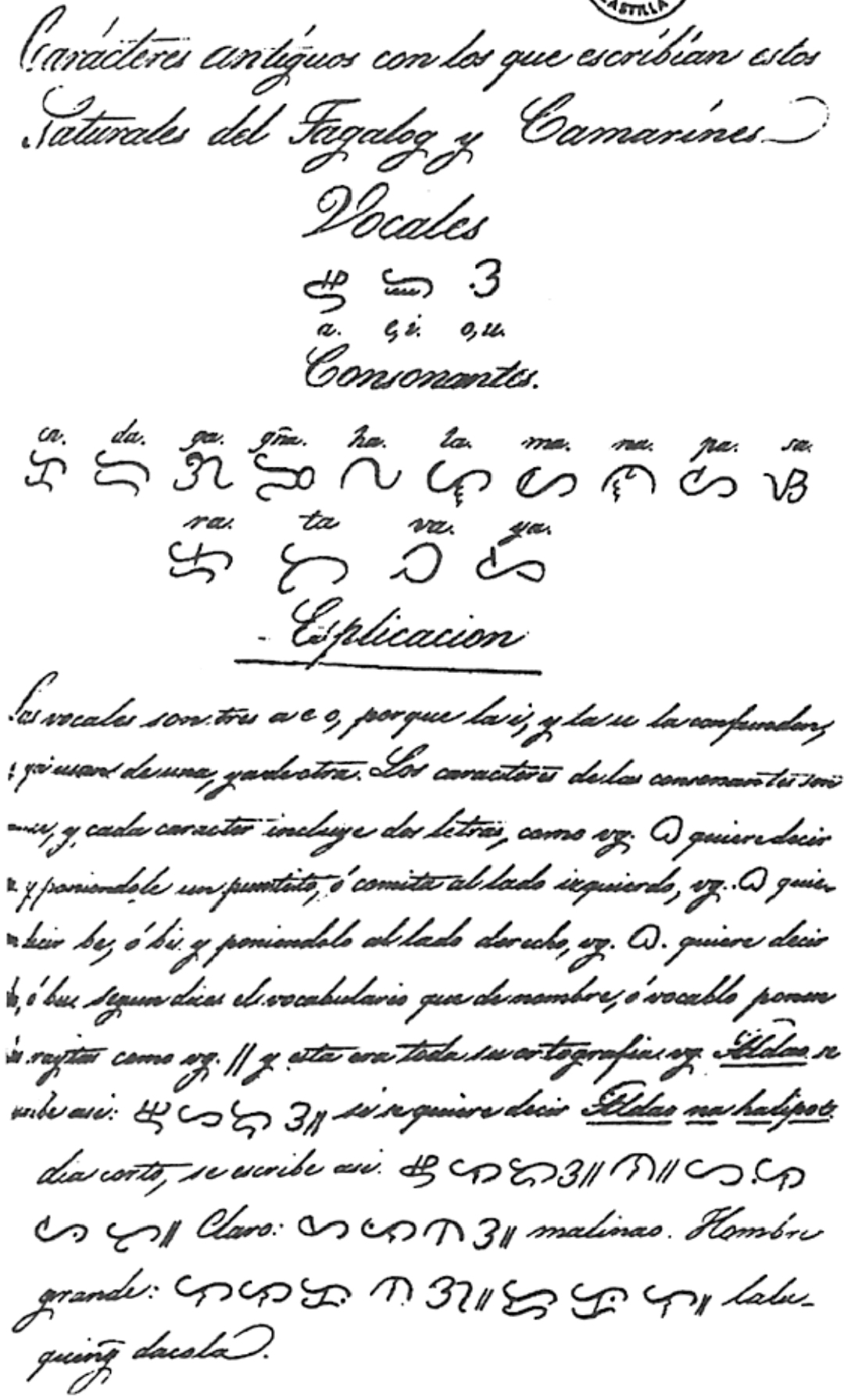
Ancient Characters of Tagalog and Camarines peoples, also called Basahan in the Bicol region

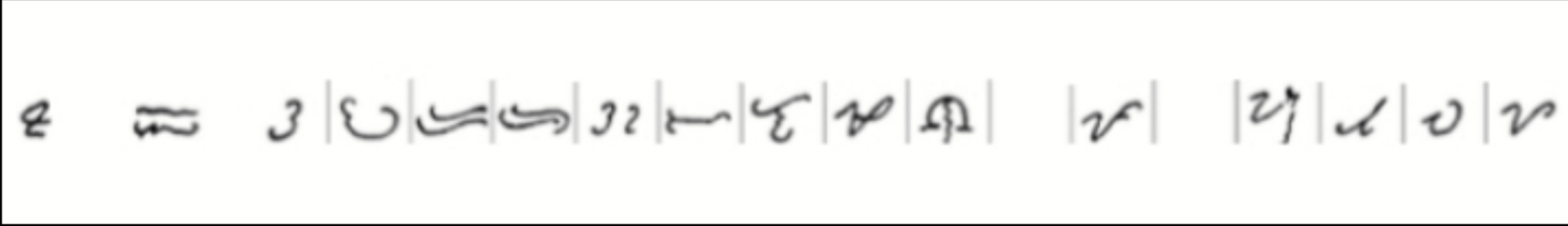
Baybayin characters found in Pangasinan

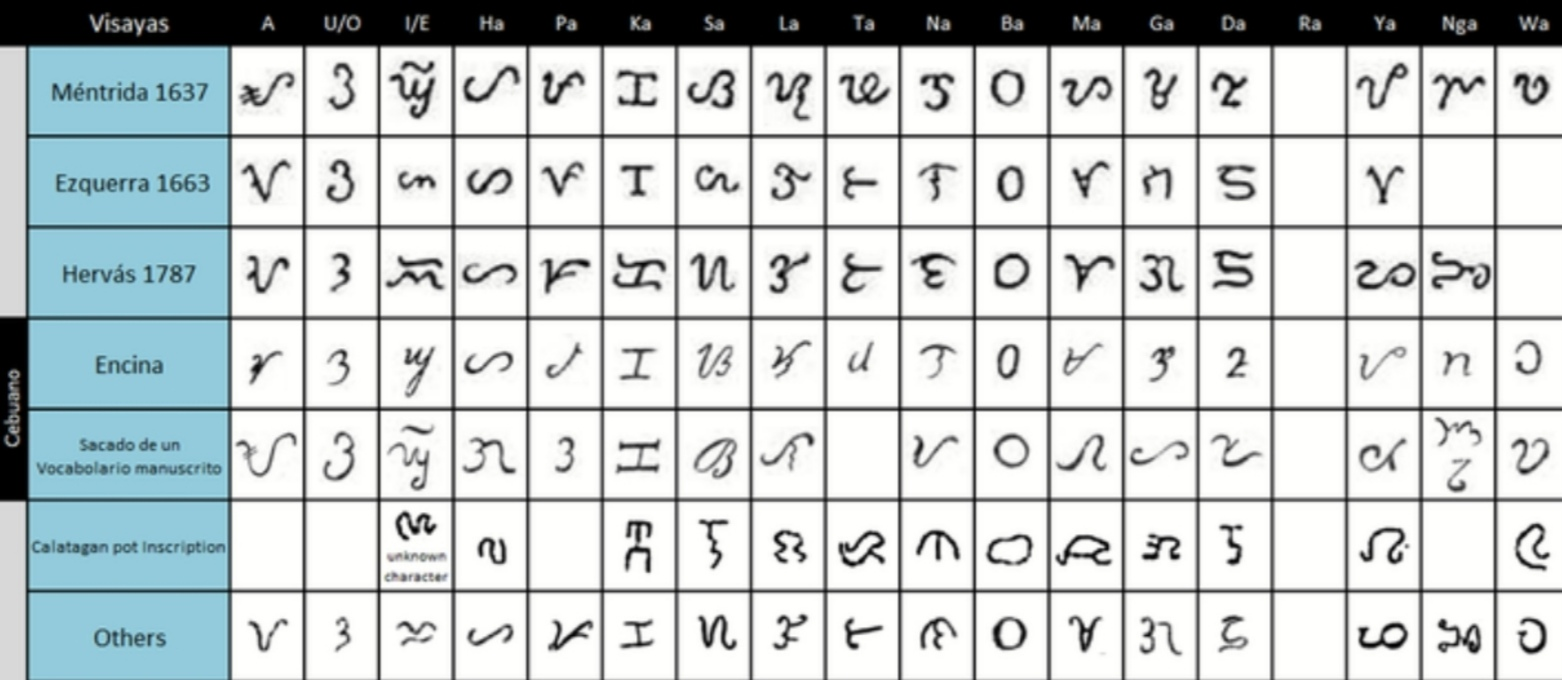
Baybayin samples found in the Visayas

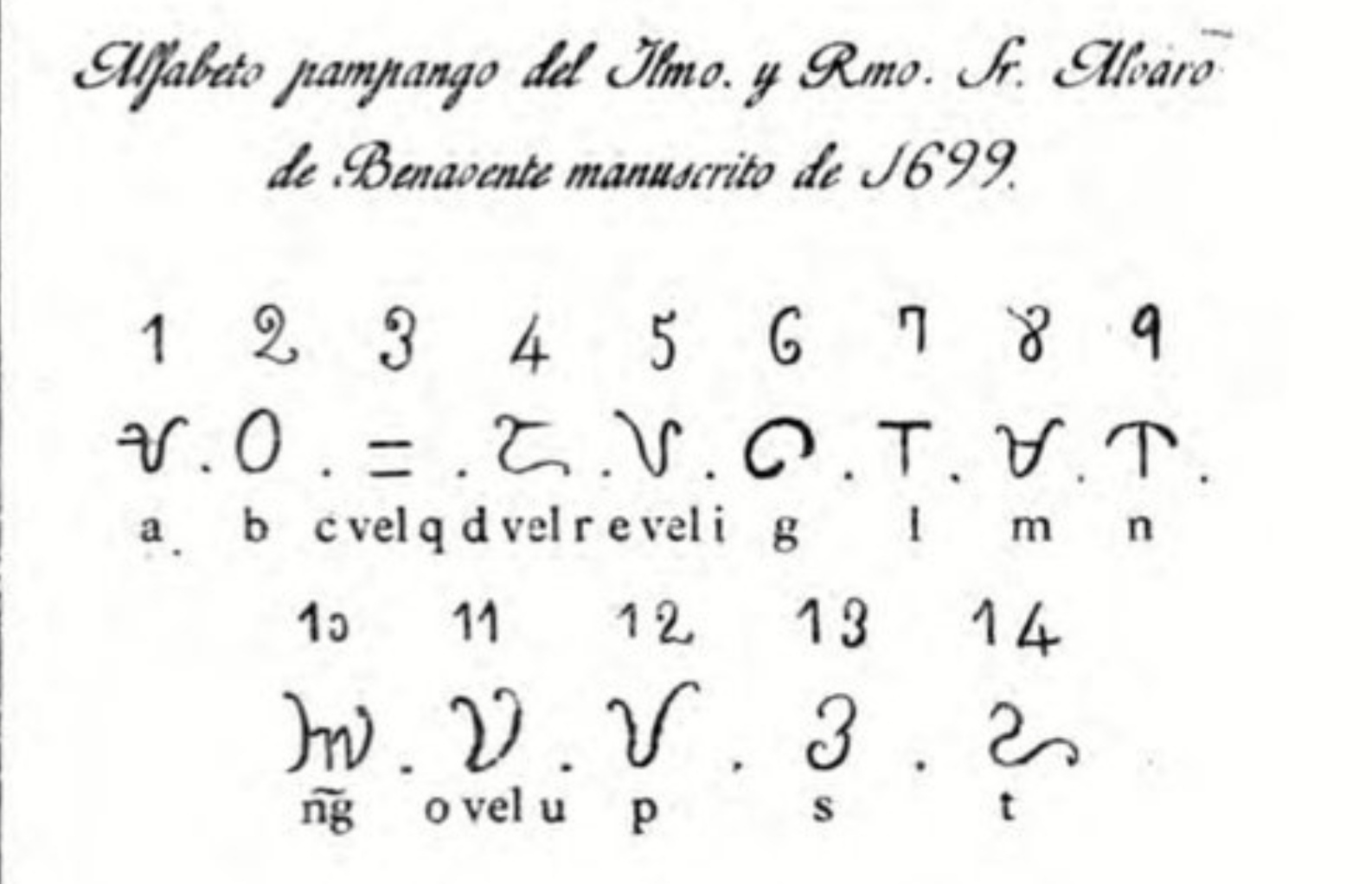
The indigenous script of Pampanga, recorded in 1699 by Álvaro de Benavente and since reconstructed as Kulitan

Although one of Ferdinand Magellan's shipmates, Antonio Pigafetta, wrote that the people of the Visayas were not literate in 1521, the baybayin had already arrived there by 1567 when Miguel López de Legazpi reported from Cebu that,

"They [the Visayans] have their letters and characters like those of the Malays, from whom they learned them; they write them on bamboo bark and palm leaves with a pointed tool, but never is any ancient writing found among them nor word of their origin and arrival in these islands, their customs and rites being preserved by traditions handed down from father to son without any other record."

A century later, in 1668, Francisco Alcina wrote:

"The characters of these natives [Visayans], or, better said, those that have been in use for a few years in these parts, an art which was communicated to them from the Tagalogs, and the latter learned it from the Borneans who came from the great island of Borneo to Manila, with whom they have considerable traffic... From these Borneans the Tagalogs learned their characters, and from them the Visayans, so they call them Moro characters or letters because the Moros taught them... [the Visayans] learned [the Moros'] letters, which many use today, and the women much more than the men, which they write and read more readily than the latter."

Francisco de Santa Inés explained in 1676 why writing baybayin was more common among women, as "they do not have any other way to while away the time, for it is not customary for little girls to go to school as boys do, they make better use of their characters than men, and they use them in things of devotion, and in other things that are not of devotion."

=== Spanish colonial period ===
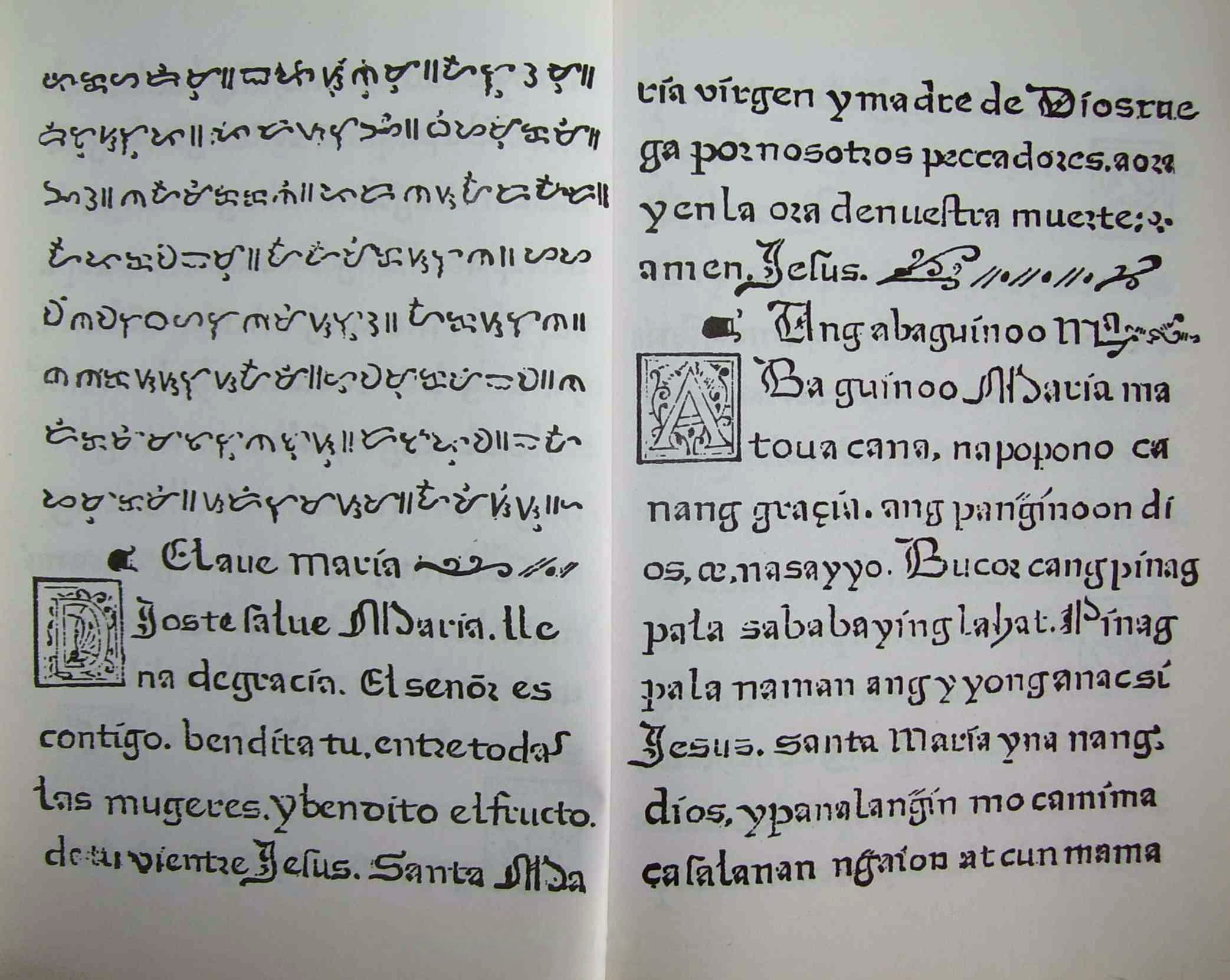
Pages of the Doctrina Christiana, an early Christian book in Spanish and Tagalog, both in the Latin script and in baybayin (1593)

The earliest printed book in a Philippine language, featuring both Tagalog in baybayin and transliterated into the Latin script, is the 1593 Doctrina Christiana en Lengua Española y Tagala. The Tagalog text was based mainly on a manuscript written by Fr. Juan de Placencia. Friars Domingo de Nieva and Juan de San Pedro Martyr supervised the preparation and printing of the book, which was carried out by an unnamed Chinese artisan. This is the earliest example of baybayin that exists today, and it is the only example from the 1500s. There is also a series of legal documents containing baybayin, preserved in Spanish and Philippine archives that span more than a century: the three oldest, all in the Archivo General de Indias in Seville, are from 1591 and 1599.

Baybayin was noted by the Spanish priest Pedro Chirino in 1604 and Antonio de Morga in 1609 to be known by most Filipinos, and was generally used for personal writings and poetry, among others. However, according to William Henry Scott, there were some datus from the 1590s who could not sign affidavits or oaths, and witnesses who could not sign land deeds in the 1620s.

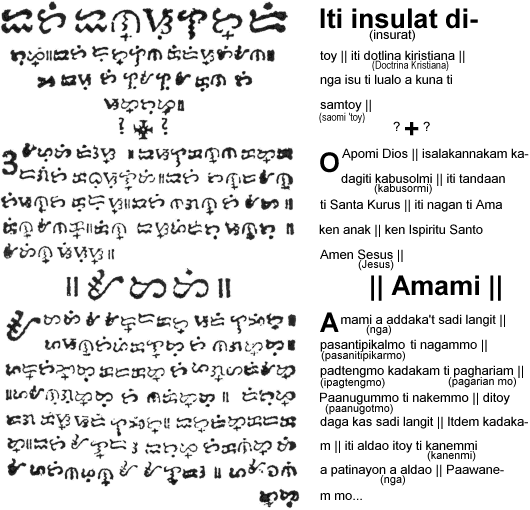
Amami, a fragment of the Ilocano Lord's Prayer, written in Ilocano baybayin (Kur-itan, Kurdita), the first to use krus-kudlít.

In 1620, Libro a naisurátan amin ti bagás ti Doctrina Cristiana was written by Fr. Francisco Lopez, an Ilocano Doctrina the first Ilocano baybayin, based on the catechism written by Cardinal Bellarmine. This is an important moment in the history of baybayin, because the krus-kudlít was introduced for the first time, which allowed writing final consonants. He commented the following on his decision:

"The reason for putting the text of the Doctrina in Tagalog type... has been to begin the correction of the said Tagalog script, which, as it is, is so defective and confused (because of not having any method until now for expressing final consonants - I mean, those without vowels) that the most learned reader has to stop and ponder over many words to decide on the pronunciation which the writer intended."

This krus-kudlít, or virama kudlít, did not catch on among baybayin users, however. Native baybayin experts were consulted about the new invention and were asked to adopt it and use it in all their writings. After praising the invention and showing gratitude for it, they decided that it could not be accepted into their writing because "It went against the intrinsic properties and nature that God had given their writing and that to use it was tantamount to destroy with one blow all the Syntax, Prosody and Orthography of their Tagalog language."

In 1703, baybayin was reported to still be in use in the Comintan (Batangas and Laguna) and other areas of the Philippines.

Among the earliest literature on the orthography of Visayan languages were those of Jesuit priest Ezguerra with his Arte de la lengua bisaya in 1747 and of Mentrida with his Arte de la lengua bisaya: Iliguaina de la isla de Panay in 1818 which primarily discussed grammatical structure. Based on the differing sources spanning centuries, the documented syllabaries also differed in form.

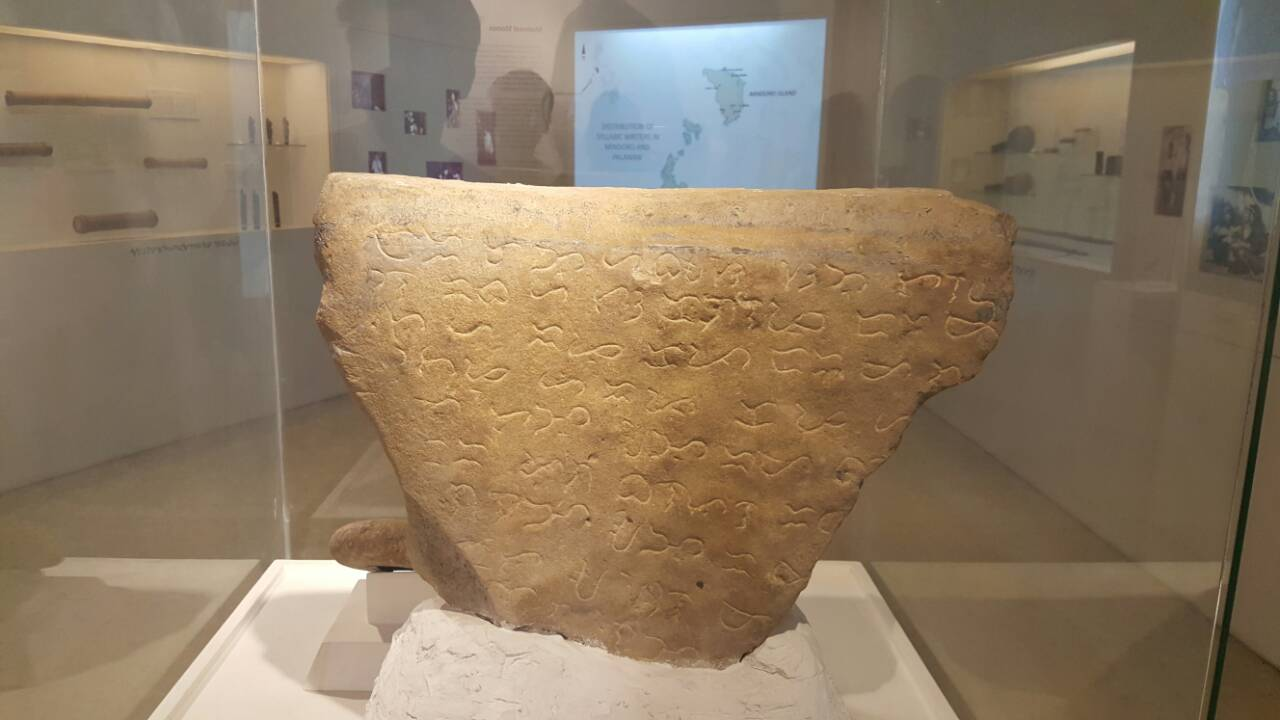
The Monreal stone, which is the centerpiece at the baybayin section of the National Museum of Anthropology

The Ticao stone inscription, also known as the Monreal stone or Rizal stone, is a limestone tablet that contains baybayin characters. Found by pupils of Rizal Elementary School on Ticao Island in Monreal town, Masbate, which had scraped the mud off their shoes and slippers on two irregular shaped limestone tablets before entering their classroom, they are now housed at a section of the National Museum of the Philippines, which weighs 30 kilos, is 11 centimeters thick, 54 centimeters long and 44 centimeters wide while the other is 6 centimeters thick, 20 centimeters long and 18 centimeters wide.

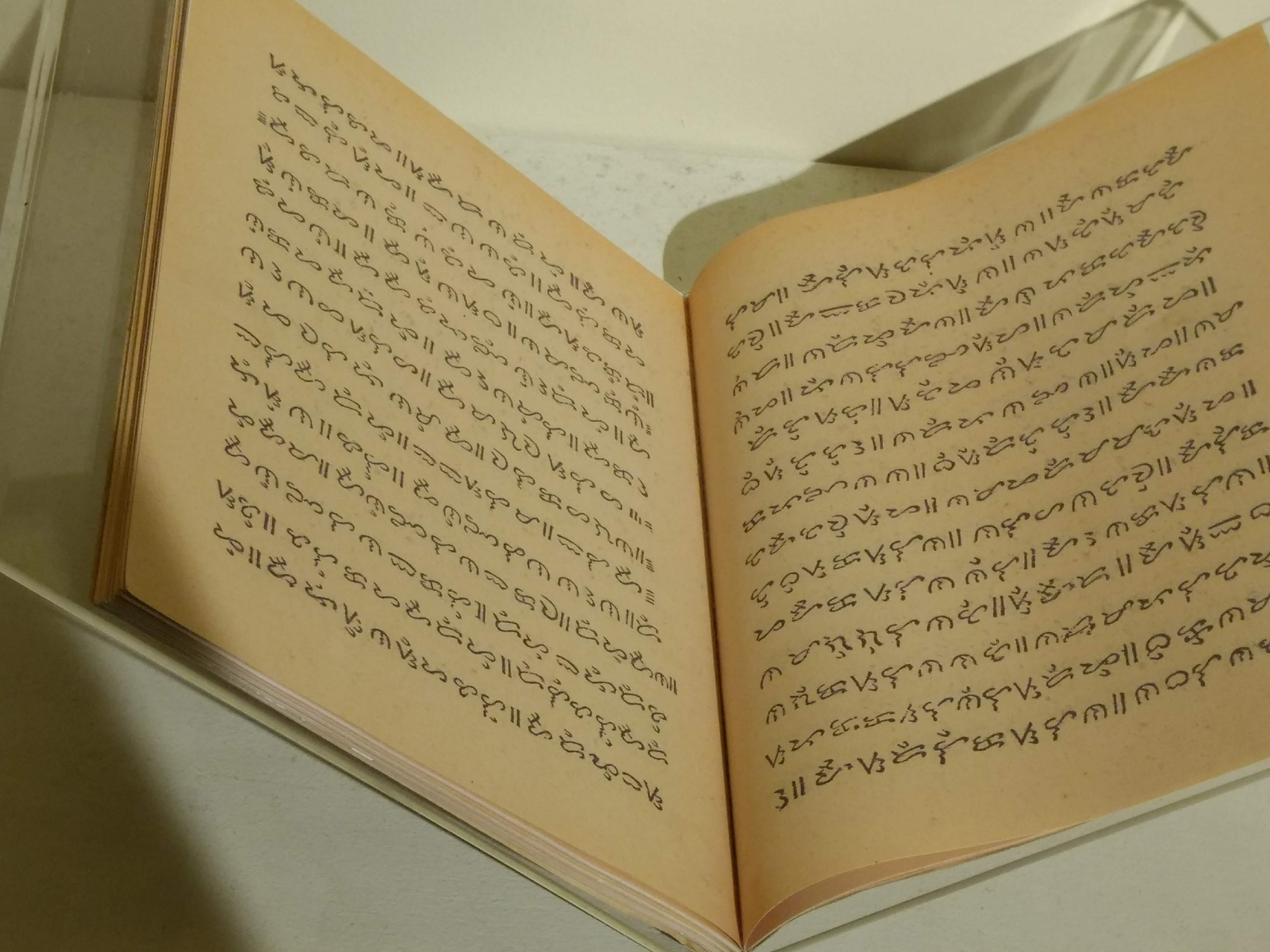
The Doctrina Christiana at the National Museum Of Anthropology

Historically, baybayin was used in Tagalog and Kapampangan-speaking areas. It spread to Ilocos and Bicol through catechisms administered by friars in the early colonial period. Pedro Chirino, a Spanish priest and Antonio de Morga noted in 1604 and 1609 that most Filipino men and women could read baybayin. Before the colonial period, it was largely reserved for writing personal notes, messages, poetry, and signing documents, and not for record keeping or longform writing like books. During the colonial period, Filipinos began keeping paper records of their property and financial transactions, and would write down lessons they were taught in church. Documents written in the native language and began to play a significant role in the judicial and legal life of the colony.

Traditionally, baybayin was written upon palm leaves with a sharp stylus or on bamboo with a small knife. The curved shape of the letter forms of baybayin is influenced by this practice; straight lines would tear the leaves. Once the letters were carved into the bamboo, they were wiped with ash to make the characters stand out.

During the era of Spanish colonization, baybayin came to be written with ink on paper using a sharpened quill. Woodblock printed books were produced to facilitate the spread of Christianity. In some parts of the country, such as Mindoro the traditional writing technique has been retained.

==== Decline ====
Baybayin gradually fell out of use in much of the Philippines under Spanish rule. Learning the Latin alphabet also helped Filipinos to make socioeconomic progress, as they could rise to relatively prestigious positions such as clerks, scribes and secretaries. In 1745, Sebastián de Totanés wrote in his Arte de la lengua tagala that "The Indian [Filipino] who knows how to read baybayin is now rare, and rarer still is one who knows how to write [it]. They now all read and write in our Castilian [i.e. Latin] letters." Between 1751 and 1754, Juan José Delgado wrote that "the [native] men devoted themselves to the use of our [Latin] writing". The ambiguity of vowels i/e and o/u, the lack of syllable-final consonants, and of letters for some Spanish sounds may also have contributed to the decline of baybayin.

The rarity of pre-Hispanic baybayin texts has led to a common misconception that fanatical Spanish priests must have destroyed the majority of native documents. Anthropologist and historian H. Otley Beyer alleged in The Philippines before Magellan (1921) that, "one Spanish priest in Southern Luzon boasted of having destroyed more than three hundred scrolls written in the native character", but the veracity of this statement remains unresolved among historians today, and there is no direct evidence of substantial destruction of documents by Spanish missionaries. Hector Santos has suggested that, although Spanish friars may have occasionally burned short documents such as incantations, curses, and spells (deemed evil by the Church), there was no systematic destruction of pre-Hispanic manuscripts. Morrow also notes that there are no recorded instances of pre-Hispanic Filipinos writing on scrolls, and that the most likely reason why no pre-Hispanic documents survived is because they wrote on perishable materials such as leaves and bamboo. There are also no reports of Tagalog written scriptures, as the Filipinos kept their theological knowledge in oral form while using the Baybayin for secular purposes and talismans.

The scholar Isaac Donoso claims that the documents written in the native language and in native scripts played a significant role in the judicial and legal life of the early colonial period and noted that many colonial-era documents written in baybayin (two of which were currently released to the public) still exist in some repositories, including the library of the University of Santo Tomas. He also noted that the early Spanish missionaries did not suppress the usage of the baybayin script, but instead promoted it as a measure to stop Islamization, since the Tagalog language was moving from baybayin to Jawi, the Arabized script of Islamized Southeast Asian societies. Paul Morrow also suggests that Spanish friars helped to preserve baybayin by continuing its use even after it had been abandoned by most Filipinos.

== Contemporary usage and revival ==
A number of legislative bills have been proposed periodically aimed at promoting the writing system, including the "National Writing System Act" (House Bill 1022/Senate Bill 433).

There are attempts to modernize baybayin, such as adding letters like R, C, V, Z, F, Q, and X that are not originally on the script in order to make writing modern Filipino words easier such as the word "Zambales" and other provinces and towns in the Philippines that have Spanish origins.

Baybayin was used in the most current New Generation Currency series of the Philippine peso issued in the last quarter of 2010. The word used on the bills was "Pilipino" (ᜉᜒᜎᜒᜉᜒᜈᜓ).

It is also used in Philippine passports, specifically the latest e-passport edition issued 11 August 2009 onwards. The odd pages of pages 3–43 have "ᜀᜅ᜔ ᜃᜆᜓᜏᜒᜇᜈ᜔ ᜀᜌ᜔ ᜈᜄ᜔ᜉᜉᜇᜃᜒᜎ ᜐ ᜁᜐᜅ᜔ ᜊᜌᜈ᜔" ("Ang katuwiran ay nagpapadakila sa isang bayan"/"Righteousness exalts a nation") in reference to Proverbs 14:34.

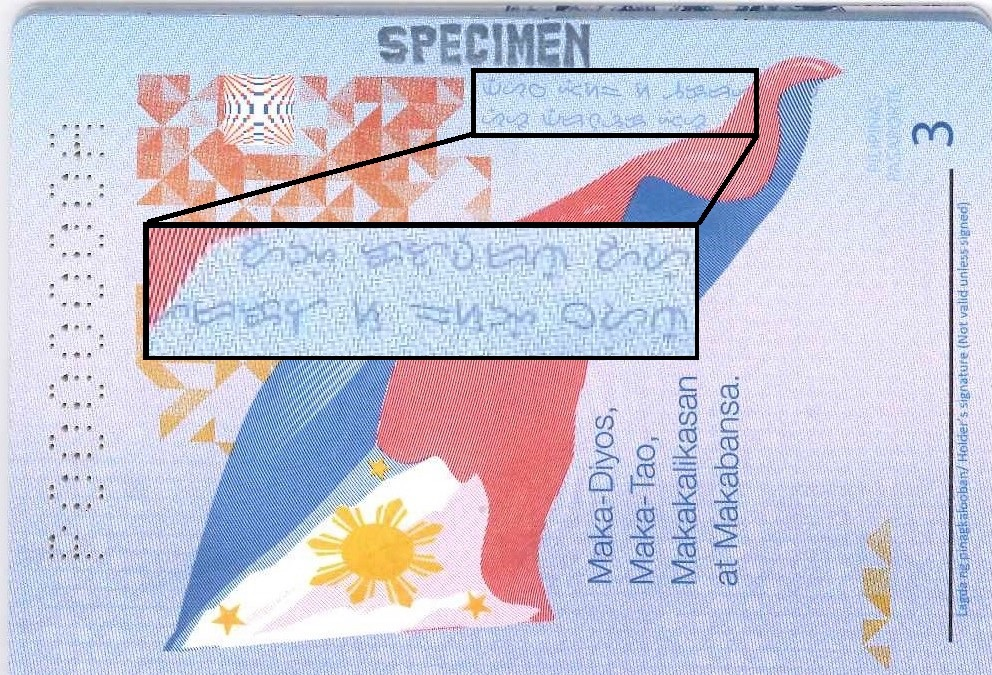
Philippine passport showing the Baybayin script

Flag of the Katipunan Magdiwang faction, with the Baybayin letter ka

Seal of the National Historical Commission of the Philippines, with the two Baybayin ka and pa letters in the center

Logo of the National Library of the Philippines. The Baybayin text reads ᜃᜇᜓᜈᜓᜅᜈ᜔, karunungan, 'wisdom'

Logo of the National Museum of the Philippines, with a Baybayin pa letter in the center, in a traditional rounded style

Logo of the Cultural Center of the Philippines, with three rotated occurrences of the Baybayin ka letter

Logo of National Commission for Culture and the Arts, with the Baybayin letter ka stylized as an eternal flame

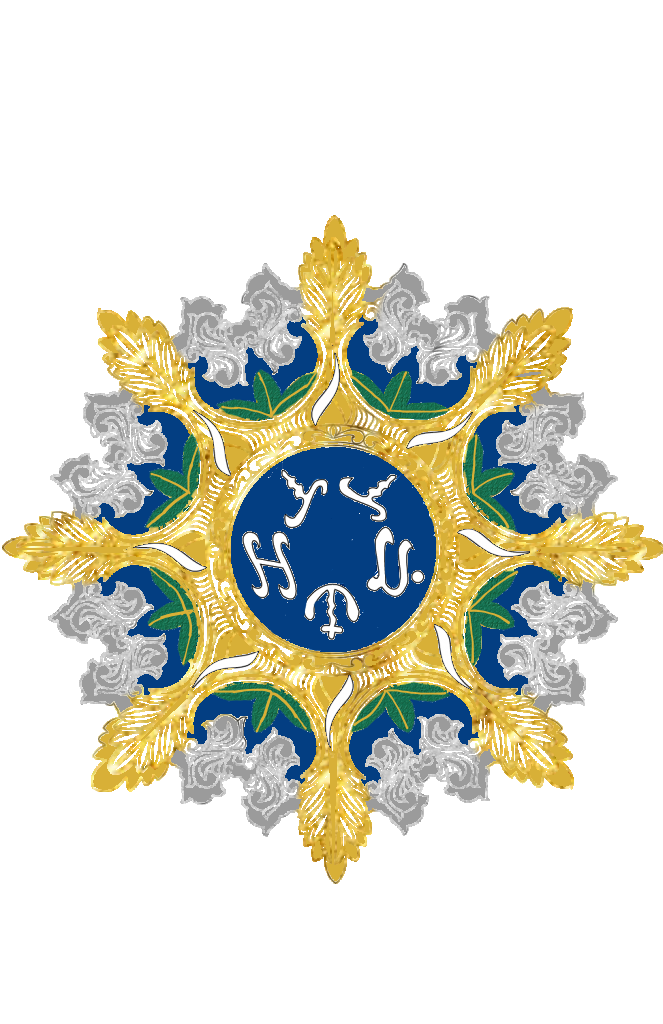
The insignia of the Order of Lakandula with the name Lakandula, in the middle, read counterclockwise from the top

Logo of the National Living Treasures Award with the words Manlilikha ng Bayan

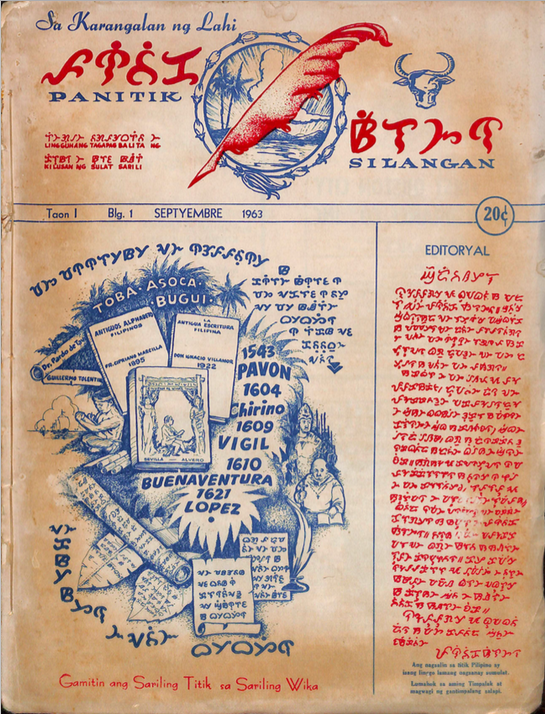
The front page of the publication "Panitik Silangan", mostly printed in Baybayin, September 1963

== Derivative scripts ==
Bayabin's surviving descendant scripts are concentrated in Mindoro and Palawan. These include the Tagbanwa script, also known as ibalnan by the Palawan people who have adopted it, and the Buhid script and the Hanunóo script of Mindoro. The modern Kulitan script is a unique script that employs consonant stacking and is derived from Old Kapampangan, the precolonial Indic script used to write the Kapampangan language, and reformed in recent decades.

== Sample texts ==
=== Article one of the Universal Declaration of Human Rights ===
Tagalog in Baybayin script;

ᜀᜅ᜔ ᜎᜑᜆ᜔ ᜈᜅ᜔ ᜆᜂ ᜀᜌ᜔ ᜁᜐᜒᜈᜒᜎᜅ᜔ ᜈ ᜋᜎᜌ ᜀᜆ᜔ ᜉᜈ᜔ᜆᜌ᜔ᜉᜈ᜔ᜆᜌ᜔ ᜐ ᜃᜇᜅᜎᜈ᜔ ᜀᜆ᜔ ᜋᜅ ᜃᜇᜉᜆᜈ᜔᜶ ᜐᜒᜎ ᜀᜌ᜔ ᜉᜒᜈᜄ᜔ᜃᜎᜓᜂᜊᜈ᜔ ᜈᜅ᜔ ᜃᜆᜓᜏᜒᜇᜈ᜔ ᜀᜆ᜔ ᜊᜓᜇ᜔ᜑᜒ ᜀᜆ᜔ ᜇᜉᜆ᜔ ᜋᜄ᜔ᜉᜎᜄᜌᜈ᜔ ᜀᜅ᜔ ᜁᜐᜆ᜔ ᜁᜐ ᜐ ᜇᜒᜏ ᜈᜅ᜔ ᜉᜄ᜔ᜃᜃᜉᜆᜒᜇᜈ᜔᜶

Romanized

Ang lahát ng tao ay isinilang na malayà at pantáy-pantáy sa karangalan at mangá karapatán. Sila ay pinagkalooban ng katuwiran at budhî at dapat magpalagayan ang isá't isá sa diwà nang pagkákapatíran.

English

All human beings are born free and equal in dignity and rights. They are endowed with reason and conscience and should act towards one another in a spirit of brotherhood.

=== Motto of the Philippines ===
Tagalog in Baybayin script

ᜋᜃᜇᜒᜌᜓᜐ᜔᜵ ᜋᜃᜆᜂ᜵ ᜋᜃᜃᜎᜒᜃᜐᜈ᜔᜵ ᜀᜆ᜔ ᜋᜃᜊᜈ᜔ᜐ᜶ ᜁᜐᜅ᜔ ᜊᜈ᜔ᜐ᜵ ᜁᜐᜅ᜔ ᜇᜒᜏ᜶

Romanized

Maka-Diyós, Maka-Tao, Makakalikasan, at Makabansâ. Isáng Bansâ, Isáng Diwà

English

For God, for people, for nature, and for country. One country, one spirit.

=== National anthem ===
The first two verses of the Philippine national anthem, Lupang Hinirang.

Tagalog in Baybayin script

ᜊᜌᜅ᜔ ᜋᜄᜒᜎᜒᜏ᜔᜵
ᜉᜒᜇ᜔ᜎᜐ᜔ ᜈᜅ᜔ ᜐᜒᜎᜅᜈᜈ᜔᜵
ᜀᜎᜊ᜔ ᜈᜅ᜔ ᜉᜓᜐᜓ᜵
ᜐ ᜇᜒᜊ᜔ᜇᜒᜊ᜔ ᜋᜓᜌ᜔ ᜊᜓᜑᜌ᜔᜶

ᜎᜓᜉᜅ᜔ ᜑᜒᜈᜒᜇᜅ᜔᜵
ᜇᜓᜌᜈ᜔ ᜃ ᜈᜅ᜔ ᜋᜄᜒᜆᜒᜅ᜔᜵
ᜐ ᜋᜈ᜔ᜎᜓᜎᜓᜉᜒᜄ᜔᜵
ᜇᜒ ᜃ ᜉᜐᜒᜐᜒᜁᜎ᜔᜶

Romanized

Bayang magiliw,
Perlas ng silanganan,
Alab ng puso
Sa dibdib mo'y buhay.

Lupang hinirang,
Duyan ka ng magiting,
Sa manlulupig
Di ka pasisiil.

International phonetic alphabet

[ˈbaː.jɐŋ mɐˈɣiː.liʊ̯]
[ˈpɛɾ.lɐs n̪ɐŋ sɪ.lɐˈŋaː.n̪ɐn̪]
[ˈʔaː.lɐb n̪ɐŋ ˈpuː.so(ʔ)]
[sɐ d̪ɪbˈd̪ib moɪ̯ bʊˈhaɪ̯]

[ˈluː.pɐŋ hɪˈn̪iː.ɾɐŋ]
[ˈd̪uː.jɐn̪ kɐ n̪ɐŋ mɐˈɣiː.t̪ɪŋ]
[ˌsa mɐn̪.lʊˈluː.pɪɡ̚]
[ˌd̪i(ʔ) kɐ pɐ.sɪ.sɪˈʔil]

English

Land of the morning,
Child of the sun returning,
With fervor burning
Thee do our souls adore.

Land dear and holy,
Cradle of noble heroes,
Ne'er shall invaders
Trample thy sacred shores.

== Unicode ==
Baybayin was added to the Unicode Standard in March, 2002 with the release of version 3.2.

=== Block ===
The Unicode block for Baybayin is called "Tagalog" and covers U+1700–U+171F:

Tagalog^{[1]}^{[2]} Official Unicode Consortium code chart (PDF)
	0	1	2	3	4	5	6	7	8	9	A	B	C	D	E	F
U+170x	ᜀ	ᜁ	ᜂ	ᜃ	ᜄ	ᜅ	ᜆ	ᜇ	ᜈ	ᜉ	ᜊ	ᜋ	ᜌ	ᜍ	ᜎ	ᜏ
U+171x	ᜐ	ᜑ	ᜒ	ᜓ	᜔	᜕										ᜟ
Notes 1.As of Unicode version 18.0 2.Grey areas indicate non-assigned code points

== Keyboard ==
=== iOS ===

With the official release of iOS 27 on September 2026, Apple officially added support for Baybayin Keyboard.

=== macOS ===

With the formal launch of macOS 27 in September 2026, Apple introduced official support for the Baybayin Keyboard on Macs.

=== Android ===
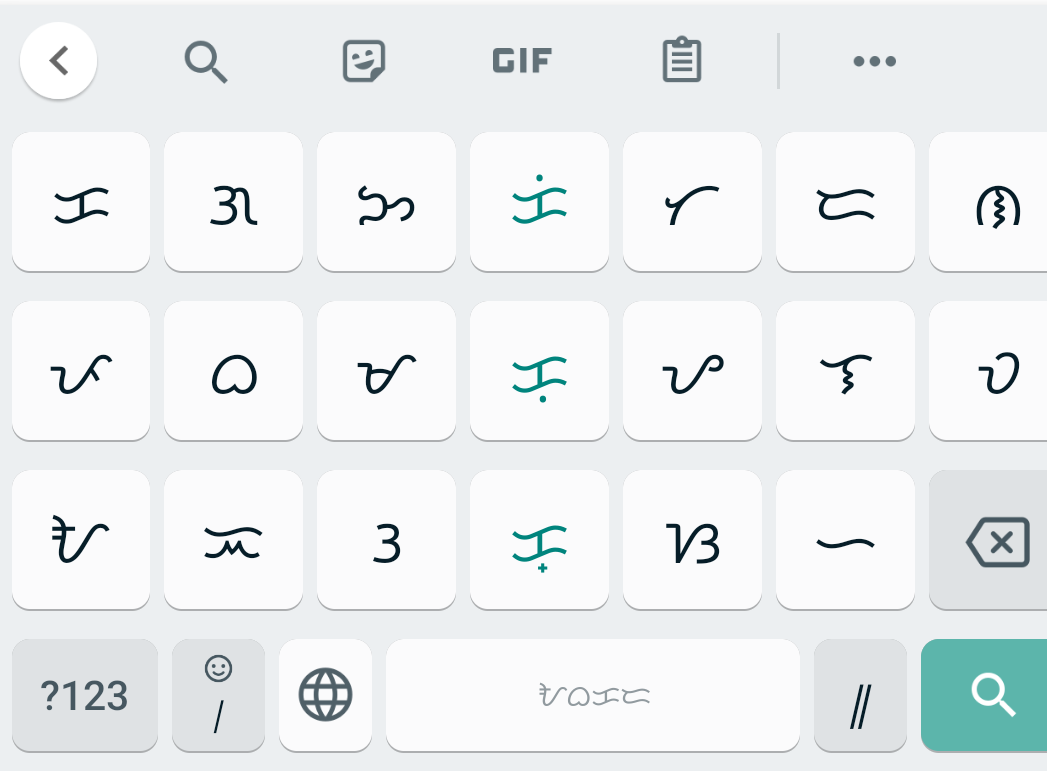
A screenshot image of the baybayin keyboard on Gboard.

The virtual keyboard app Gboard developed by Google for Android and iOS devices was updated on 1 August 2019 with its list of supported languages. This includes all Unicode Philippine Scripts blocks. Included are "Buhid", "Hanunuo", baybayin as "Filipino (Baybayin)", and the Tagbanwa script as "Aborlan". The baybayin layout, "Filipino (Baybayin)", is designed such that when the user presses the character, vowel markers (kudlít) for e/i and o/u, as well as the virama (vowel sound cancellation) are selectable.

=== Philippines Unicode Keyboard Layout with baybayin ===
It is possible to type baybayin directly from one's keyboard without the need to use web applications which implement an input method. The Philippines Unicode Keyboard Layout includes different sets of baybayin layout for different keyboard users: QWERTY, Capewell-Dvorak, Capewell-QWERF 2006, Colemak, and Dvorak, all of which work in both Microsoft Windows and Linux.

This keyboard layout baybayin can be downloaded here.

== See also ==
- Filipino orthography
  - Philippine Scripts
    - Buhid script
    - Hanuno'o script
    - Tagbanwa script
    - Kulitan
- Kawi
  - Laguna Copperplate Inscription
  - Butuan Silver Paleograph
  - Butuan Ivory Seal
- Tagalog language
  - Old Tagalog
- History of Indian influence on Southeast Asia
  - Abugida
  - Indian cultural influences in early Philippine polities

== Works cited ==
- Alfonso, Ian Christopher (2024). Munting Aklat ng Baybayin [A Little Book About Baybayin] (in Tagalog). Amlat Book Publishing House and the Philippine Historical Association. ISBN 978-621-96900-1-0.
- Charney, Michael W. (2018). "Warfare in Premodern Southeast Asia". Oxford Research Encyclopedia of Asian History. Oxford University Press.
- Clavé, Elsa; Griffiths, Arlo (2022). "The Laguna copperplate inscription: Tenth-century Luzon, Java, and the Malay world" (PDF). Philippine Studies: Historical & Ethnographic Viewpoints. 70 (2): 167–242.
- Delgado, Juan José (1892). Historia General sacro-profana, política y natural de las Islas del Poniente llamadas Filipinas (in Spanish). Manila: Imp. de el Eco de Filipinas – via University of Michigan Library.
- Diringer, David (1948). The Alphabet: A Key to the History of Mankind (Second and revised ed.). London: Hutchinson's Scientific and Technical Publications – via Archive.org.
- Donoso, Isaac (2019). "Letra de Meca: Jawi Script in the Tagalog Region During the 16th Century". Journal of Al-Tamaddun. 14 (1): 89–103. doi:10.22452/JAT.vol14no1.8. hdl:10045/93950.
- Duka, Cecilio D. (2008). Struggle for Freedom: A Textbook on Philippine History. Manila: Rex Book Store. ISBN 978-971-23-5045-0.
- Chirino, Pedro (1890) [First published 1604]. Relación de las Islas Filipinas y de lo que en ellas han trabajado los padres de la Compañía de Jesús: del P. Pedro Chirino (in Spanish) (2nd ed.). Manila: Imprenta de D. Esteban Balbas – via University of Michigan Library.
- Halili, Maria Christine N. (2004). Philippine History. Manila: Rex Book Store. ISBN 978-971-23-3934-9.
- Martinez, Julius C. (2023). "Recovering translingualism in precolonial Philippines". International Journal of Multilingualism. 20 (3): 1031–1051. doi:10.1080/14790718.2021.1932909.
- Potet, Jean-Paul G. (2017). Ancient Beliefs and Customs of the Tagalogs. Morrisville, North Carolina: Lulu Press. ISBN 978-0-244-34873-1.
- Potet, Jean-Paul G. (2018). Baybayin: The Syllabic Alphabet of the Tagalogs. Raleigh, North Carolina: Lulu Press. ISBN 978-0-244-14241-4.
- Sagar, Krishna Chandra (2002). An Era of Peace. New Delhi: Northern Book Centre.
- Scott, William Henry (1984). Prehispanic Source Materials for the Study of Philippine History. Quezon City: New Day Publishers.
- Salomon, Richard (1998). Indian Epigraphy: A Guide to the Study of Inscriptions in Sanskrit, Prakrit, and the other Indo-Aryan Languages. Oxford University Press. ISBN 978-0-19-535666-3.
