= Ethnic groups in the Philippines =

Dominant ethnic groups by province.

The Philippines is inhabited by more than 185 ethnolinguistic groups, many of which are classified as "Indigenous Peoples" under the country's Indigenous Peoples' Rights Act of 1997. Traditionally Muslim minorities from the southernmost island group of Mindanao are usually categorized together as Moro peoples, whether they are classified as Indigenous peoples or not. About 142 are classified as non-Muslim Indigenous people groups. Ethnolinguistic groups collectively known as the Lowland Christians, forms the majority ethnic group.

The Muslim ethnolinguistic groups of Mindanao, Sulu, and Palawan are collectively referred to as the Moro people, a broad category that includes some Indigenous people groups and some non-Indigenous people groups. With a population of over 5 million people, they comprise about 5% of the country's total population.

About 142 of the Philippines' Indigenous people groups are not classified as Moro peoples. Some of these people groups are commonly grouped together due to their strong association with a shared geographic area, although these broad categorizations are not always welcomed by the ethnic groups themselves. For example, the Indigenous peoples of the Cordillera Mountain Range in northern Luzon are often referred to using the exonym "Igorot people," or more recently, as the Cordilleran peoples. Meanwhile, the non-Moro peoples of Mindanao are collectively referred to as the Lumad, a collective autonym conceived in 1986 as a way to distinguish them from their neighboring Indigenous Moro and Visayan neighbors. Small Indigenous ethnic communities remain marginalized, and often poorer than the rest of society.

About 86 to 87 percent of the Philippine population belong to the 19 ethnolinguistic groups which are classified as neither Indigenous nor Moro. These groups are collectively referred to as "Lowland Christianized groups," to distinguish them from the other ethnolinguistic groups. The most populous of these groups, with populations exceeding a million individuals, are the Ilocano, the Pangasinense, the Kapampangan, the Tagalog, the Bicolano, and the Visayans (including the Cebuano, the Boholano, the Hiligaynon/Ilonggo, and the Waray). These native and migrant lowland coastal groups converted to Christianity during the Spanish colonization which culturally unified them and adopted heavy western elements of culture throughout the country's history.

Due to the past history of the Philippines since the Spanish colonial era, there are also some historical migrant heritage groups such as the Chinese Filipinos and Spanish Filipinos, both of whom intermixed with the above lowland Austronesian-speaking ethnic groups, which produced Filipino Mestizos. These groups also comprise and contribute a considerable proportion of the country's population, especially its bourgeois, and economy and were integral to the establishment of the country, from the rise of Filipino nationalism by the Ilustrado intelligentsia to the Philippine Revolution. Other peoples of migrant and/or mixed descent include American Filipinos, Indian Filipinos, and Japanese Filipinos.

Aside from migrant groups which speak their own languages, most Filipinos speak languages classified under the Austronesian language family, including the various Negrito peoples of the archipelago, which are genetically and phenotypically distinct from the other ethnic groups of the Philippines. While these groups have maintained a culture and identity distinct from neighboring ethnic groups, they have long adapted their neighbors' Austronesian languages. Traditionally subcategorized geographically as the Ati people of Visayas and Mindanao, and the Aeta of Luzon, the Negrito population was estimated at 31,000 as of 2004.

== Origins ==
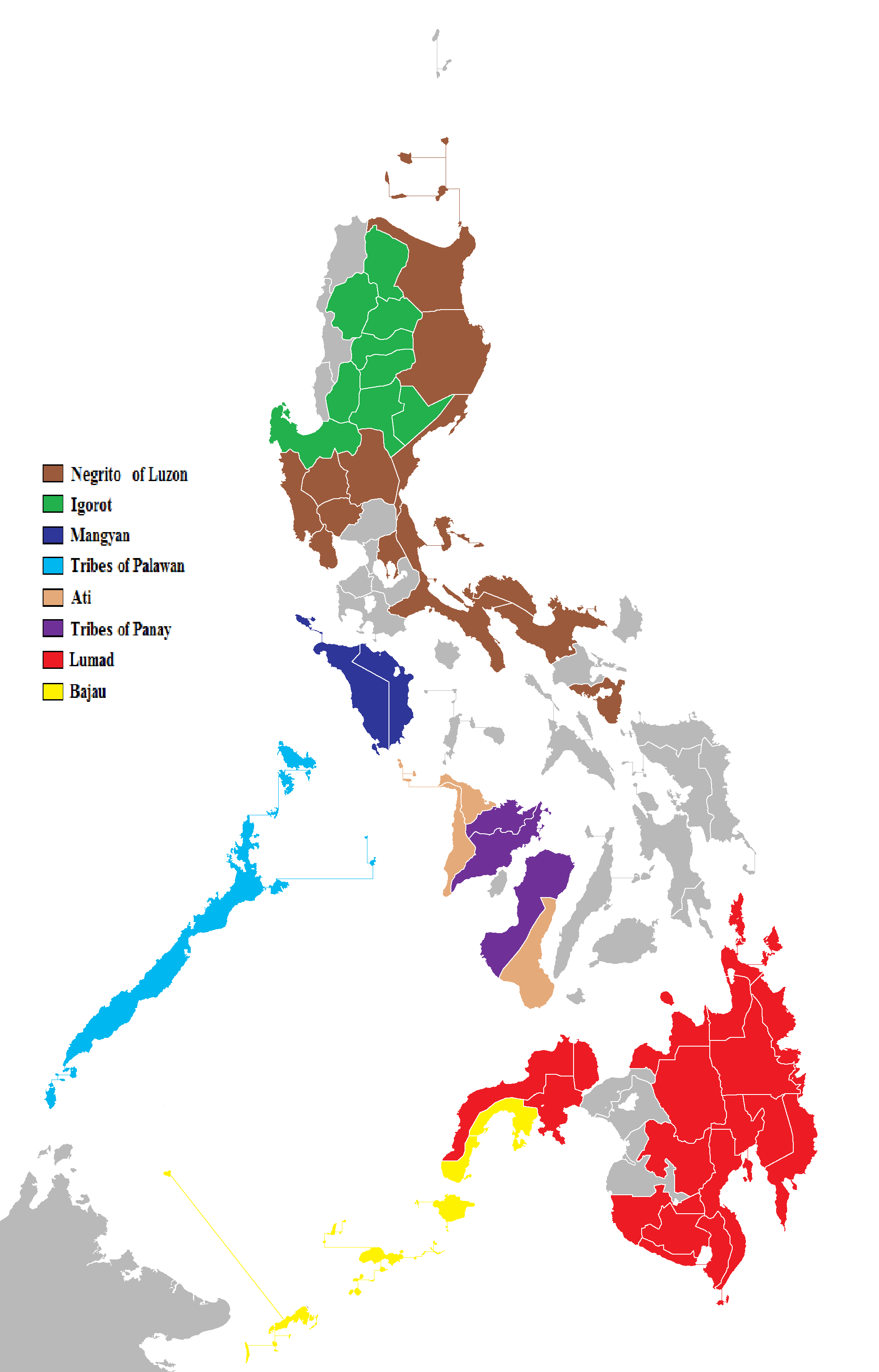
Traditional homelands of the Indigenous peoples of the Philippines

Overview of the spread & overlap of languages spoken throughout the country as of March 2017

There are several opposing theories regarding the origins of ancient Filipinos, starting with the "Waves of Migration" hypothesis of H. Otley Beyer in 1948, which claimed that Filipinos were "Indonesians" and "Malays" who migrated to the islands. This is completely rejected by modern anthropologists and is not supported by any evidence, but the hypothesis is still widely taught in Filipino elementary and public schools resulting in the widespread misconception by Filipinos that they are "Malays".

Chronological map of the Austronesian expansion

The most widely accepted theory, however, is the "Out-of-Taiwan" model which follows the Austronesian expansion during the Neolithic in a series of maritime migrations originating from Taiwan that spread to the islands of the Indo-Pacific; ultimately reaching as far as New Zealand, Easter Island, and Madagascar. Austronesians themselves originated from the Neolithic rice-cultivating pre-Austronesian civilizations of the Yangtze River delta in coastal southeastern China pre-dating the conquest of those regions by the Han Chinese. This includes civilizations like the Liangzhu culture, Hemudu culture, and the Majiabang culture. It connects speakers of the Austronesian languages in a common linguistic and genetic lineage, including the Taiwanese indigenous peoples, Islander Southeast Asians, Chams, Islander Melanesians, Micronesians, Polynesians, and the Malagasy people. Aside from language and genetics, they also share common cultural markers like multihull and outrigger boats, tattooing, rice cultivation, wetland agriculture, teeth blackening, jade carving, betel nut chewing, ancestor worship, and the same domesticated plants and animals (including dogs, pigs, chickens, yams, bananas, sugarcane, and coconuts).

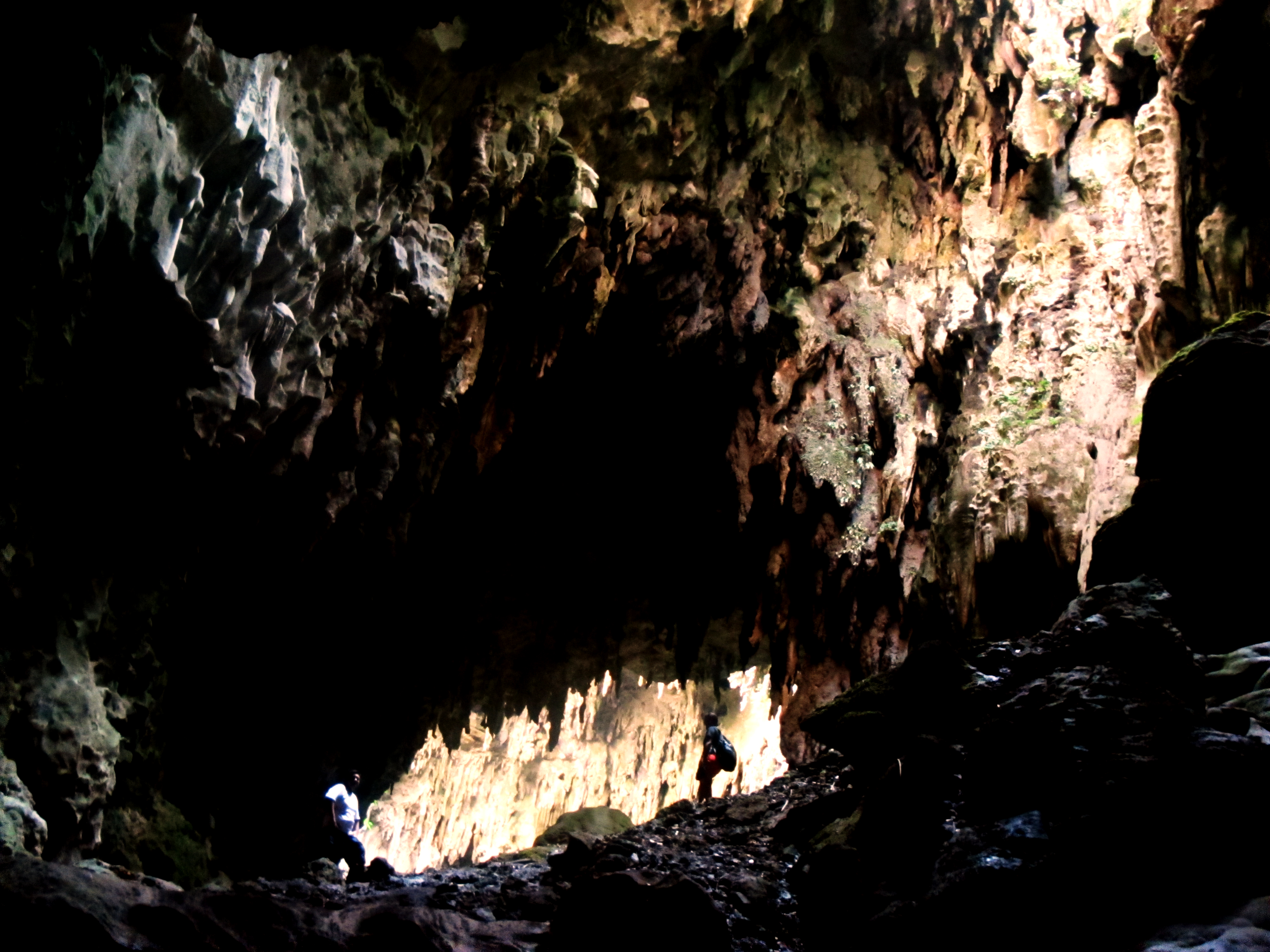
Inside the firth chamber of Callao Cave, where the remains of the Callao Man were discovered.

Prehistoric Tabon Man, found in Palawan in 1962 was, until 2007, the oldest human remains discovered by anthropologists in the Philippines. Archaeological evidence indicates similarities with two early human fossils found in Indonesia and China, called the Java Man and Peking Man. In 2007, a single metatarsal from an earlier fossil was discovered in Callao Cave, Peñablanca, Cagayan. That earlier fossil was named as Callao Man.

The Negritos arrived about 30,000 years ago and occupied several scattered areas throughout the islands. Recent archaeological evidence described by Peter Bellwood claimed that the ancestors of Filipinos, Malaysians, and Indonesians first crossed the Taiwan Strait during the Prehistoric period. These early mariners are thought to be the Austronesian people. They used boats to cross the oceans, and settled into many regions of Southeast Asia, the Polynesian Islands, and Madagascar.

Papuan ancestry was also detected among the ethnic Blaan and Sangir people of Mindanao, suggesting that there was westward expansion of peoples from New Guinea into the Philippines.

Two early East Asian waves (Austroasiatic and possible Austric) were detected, one most strongly evidenced among the Manobo people who live in inland Mindanao, and the other in the Sama-Bajau and related people of the Sulu archipelago, Zamboanga Peninsula, and Palawan. The admixture found in the Sama people indicates a relationship with the Lua and Mlabri people of mainland Southeast Asia, and reflects a similar genetic signal found in western Indonesia. These happened sometime after 15,000 years ago and 12,000 years ago respectively, around the time the last glacial period was coming to an end.

The first Austronesians reached the Philippines at around 2200 BC, settling the Batanes Islands and northern Luzon. From there, they rapidly spread southwards to the rest of the islands of the Philippine archipelago and Southeast Asia, as well as further east to reach the Northern Mariana Islands by around 1500 BC. They assimilated the older Negrito groups which arrived during the Paleolithic, resulting in the modern Filipino ethnic groups, which all display various ratios of genetic admixture between Austronesian and Negrito groups. By the 14th century, the Malayo-Polynesian ethnolinguistic groups had dominated and displaced the Negrito population in most areas. Traders from southern China, Japan, India, and Arabia also contributed to the ethnic and cultural development of the islands. The integration of Southeast Asia into Indian Ocean trading networks around 2,000 years ago also shows some impact, with South Asian genetic signals present within some Sama-Bajau communities.

By the 16th century, Spanish colonization brought new groups of people to the Philippines, mainly Spaniards and indigenous Mexicans. Many settled in intermarried with the indigenous population, giving rise to the small minority of Filipino mestizos or individuals of mixed Austronesian and White or Indigenous American descent. There was migration of a military nature from the Americas to the Philippines, originally planned to include only Spaniards and mestizos but progressively including most other groups during late 17th century. Recruitment followed general levies in New Spain cities mostly, but about 25% of the soldiers were common prisoners or illegal immigrants arrived from Spain forced to serve in Philippines as soldiers as described by Stephanie J. Mawson in her article "Convicts or Conquistadores? Spanish Soldiers in the Seventeenth-Century Pacific". In that article as well as her dissertation paper called, 'Between Loyalty and Disobedience: The Limits of Spanish Domination in the Seventeenth Century Pacific', she recorded an accumulated number of 15,600 soldiers sent to the Philippines from the Americas during the 1600s, outnumbering civilians in 7 to 1. In contrast, civilian immigration was much lower, with just about 5,000 civilians departing Spain to Philippines from 1571 to 1799, about half that number during 1600s. Clerics composed more than half of the civilian legal migrant population during 1600s. Only about a couple hundred Spanish women migrated to Philippines until 19th century, almost all of them in the early period before 1630. The total population of the Philippines in the first Spanish census was about 667,612.

Immigrants from American colonies by region and year of settlement (17th Century)
Location	1603	1636	1642	1644	1654	1655	1670	1672
Manila	900	446	—	407	821	799	708	667
Fort Santiago	—	22	—	—	50	—	86	81
Cavite	—	70	—	—	89	—	225	211
Cagayan	46	80	—	—	—	—	155	155
Calamianes	—	—	—	—	—	—	73	73
Caraga	—	45	—	—	—	—	81	81
Cebu	86	50	—	—	—	—	135	135
Formosa	—	180	—	—	—	—	—	—
Moluccas	80	480	507	—	389	—	—	—
Otón	66	50	—	—	—	—	169	169
Zamboanga	—	210	—	—	184	—	—	—
Other	255	—	—	—	—	—	—	—
	—	—	—	—	—	—	—	—
Total Reinforcements	1,533	1,633	2,067	2,085	n/a	n/a	1,632	1,572

Another 35,000 Mexican immigrants arrived in the 1700s (Note: Park 2022, p. 100, citing a 1998 journal article.) and they were part of a Philippine population of only 1.5 million, forming about 2.3% of the population.

In the late 1700s to early 1800s, Joaquín Martínez de Zúñiga, an Agustinian Friar from Spain, in his Two Volume Book: "Estadismo de las islas Filipinas" compiled a census of the Spanish-Philippines based on the tribute counts (representing an average family of seven to ten children and two parents per tribute) and came upon the following statistics:

Data reported for the 1800 as divided by ethnicity and province
Province	Native Tributes	Spanish Mestizo Tributes	All Tributes (Note: Including others such as Latin-Americans and Chinese-Mestizos, pure Chinese paid tribute but were not Philippine citizens as they were transients who returned to China, and Spaniards were exempt)
Tondo	14,437-1/2	3,528	27,897-7
Cavite	5,724-1/2	859	9,132-4
Laguna	14,392-1/2	336	19,448-6
Batangas	15,014	451	21,579-7
Mindoro	3,165	3-1/2	4,000-8
Bulacan	16,586-1/2	2,007	25,760-5
Pampanga	16,604-1/2	2,641	27,358-1
Bataan	3,082	619	5,433
Zambales	1,136	73	4,389
Ilocos	44,852-1/2	631	68,856
Pangasinan	19,836	719-1/2	25,366
Cagayan	9,888	0	11,244-6
Camarines	19,686-1/2	154-1/2	24,994
Albay	12,339	146	16,093
Tayabas	7,396	12	9,228
Cebu	28,112-1/2	625	28,863
Samar	3,042	103	4,060
Leyte	7,678	37-1/2	10,011
Caraga	3,497	0	4,977
Misamis	1,278	0	1,674
Negros Island	5,741	0	7,176
Iloilo	29,723	166	37,760
Capiz	11,459	89	14,867
Antique	9,228	0	11,620
Calamianes	2,289	0	3,161
TOTAL	299,049	13,201	424,992-16

The Spanish-Filipino population as a proportion of the provinces widely varied; with as high as 19% of the population of Tondo province (The most populous province and former name of Manila), to Pampanga 13.7%, Cavite at 13%, Laguna 2.28%, Batangas 3%, Bulacan 10.79%, Bataan 16.72%, Ilocos 1.38%, Pangasinan 3.49%, Albay 1.16%, Cebu 2.17%, Samar 3.27%, Iloilo 1%, Capiz 1%, Bicol 20%, and Zamboanga 40%. According to the data, in the Archdiocese of Manila which administers much of Luzon under it, about 10% of the population was Spanish-Filipino. Overall the whole Philippines, even including the provinces with no Spanish settlement, as summed up, the average percentage of Spanish Filipino tributes amount to 5% of the total population.

The previously cited census record, summing up the tributes from the late 1700s, is also corroborated by another census finished in year 1818, also headed by clergy, this time by the two Priest-Scientists, Fr. Manuel Buzeta and Fr. Felipe Bravo, concluded that there were 1,522,221 souls represented by 312,251 tributes or families across the islands. Within which; 400 tributes representing the pure Spanish showing the same number of pure Spanish families; 8,584 Spanish-mestizo tributes representing the same number of Spanish-mestizo families; and 9,901 Chinese-mestizo tributes representing the same number of Chinese-mestizo families. If calculating for the family size of a tribute which is 1 tribute to 9 persons in a family. "1:9" (1 Father and 8 Children as per the average number of children in the census, and disregarding the race of the mother that legally follows that of the husband upon marriage) 8,584 Spanish-mestizo tributes plus 400 pure Spanish tributes sum up to 8,984 Spanish-blooded tributes and when multiplied by 9 result to 71,872 Spanish-blooded citizens which is about 4.72% of the 1,522,221 living in the Spanish-Philippines, similar to 5% ratio stated in the earlier census by Joaquín Martínez de Zúñiga.

As outlined below are the primary statistics of the said census.

Felipe Bravo Census Demographics (Albay, 1818)
Provinces	Pueblos	Native Families	Spanish Filipino Families	Negrito Families	Chinese Filipino Families
Albay	Albay, Cabicera	5,515		2	2
	Manito	240	4		
	Bacon	2,119	45		
	Cuba	2,162	52		
	Casiguran	1,025	28		
	Juban	396	18		
	Sorsogon	1,783	149		
	Bulusan	1,777	19		
	Bulan	714	16		
	Donsol	241			
	Quipia	269			
	Lilog	821	33	23	
	Bacacay	1,295	77		
	Malilipot	981	53		
	Tabaco	3,347	225		
	Malitao	2,844	241		
	Tibi	2,069	157	110	
	Lagonoy y su anejo	1,669	18	521	
	San Jose	1,829	114	470	
	Caramoan	641		72	
Total		31,737	1,249	1,198	2

Felipe Bravo Census Demographics (Isla De Ticao, 1818)
Provinces	Pueblos	Native Families	Spanish Filipino Families	Negrito Families	Chinese Filipino Families
Isla de Ticao	San Jacinto	266	8		
Total		266	8		

Felipe Bravo Census Demographics (Isla De Masbate, 1818)
Provinces	Pueblos	Native Families	Spanish Filipino Families	Negrito Families	Chinese Filipino Families
Isla de Masbate	Mobo	912	1		
Total		912	1		

Felipe Bravo Census Demographics (Isla De Catanduanes, 1818)
Provinces	Pueblos	Native Families	Spanish Filipino Families	Negrito Families	Chinese Filipino Families
Isla De Catanduanes	Virac	1,581	91		
	Calolbon	847	3		
	Eiga	847	3		
	Payo y sus anejos Bagamanoc y Ooc	644	17		
	Pandan y Caramoan	489	2		
Total		4,408	116		

Felipe Bravo Census Demographics (Antique, 1818)
Provinces	Pueblos	Native Families	Spanish Filipino Families	Chinese Filipino Families
Antique	San José de Buenavista, cabecera	5,925	6	
	San Pedro de Balbalan	2,247		
	Sibalom	4,665	2	
	Patnongon y su visita Coritan	2,097	3	
	Bugason	3,060	1	
	San Antonio de Nalupa, su anejo Culari y visitas Tibiao, Bitad, Tun, Bacafan y Batunan	2,542	19	
	Pandan	300		
	Antique	2,304	12	
	Dao	1,296	7	
	Cagayan Chico en la isla del mismo nombre	527		
Total	(Across the Province)	24,963	50	40

Felipe Bravo Census Demographics (Bataan, 1818)
Provinces	Pueblos	Native Families	Spanish Filipino Families	Moreno Filipino Families	Negro (Black) Filipino Families	Chinese Filipino Families
Bataan	Balanga, cabecera	1,608	12		18	8
	Abucay	1,406	20		3	5
	Samar	1,000	4		1	
	Orani	1,000	25			8
	Llana-Hermosa	716	1			
	San Juan de Dinalupijan	451	19		7	3
	Pilar	899				
	Mariveles y su visita Morong	1,522	3	1	5	
	Orion ú Odiong	1,550	8	2	18	3
Total		10,152	92	3	52	27

Felipe Bravo Census Demographics (Batangas, 1818)
Provinces	Pueblos	Native Families	Spanish Filipino Families	Chinese Filipino Families
Batangas	Balayan, cabecera.	4,521	22	
	Lian.	629	7	
	Nasugbů.	866		2
	Rosario	1,758	4	
	Santo Tomas.	1,256		
	San Pablo de los Montes	1,948	7	
	Taal	8,312		
	Baoan ó Banang	5,813		
	Batangas	6,889		
	San José	2,427		
	Tanauan.	2,106		
	Lipa	4,104		
Total		40,629	40	2

Felipe Bravo Census Demographics (Bulacan, 1818)
Provinces	Pueblos	Native Families	Spanish Filipino Families	Converted Negro Families	Chinese Filipino Families
Bulacan	Bulacan, cabecera.	5,200			
	Bigáa.	1,876			
	Guiguinto.	1,291			
	Malolos.	8,110			
	Paombon.	1,058			
	Hagonoy.	4,572			
	Calumpít.	2,628			
	Quingua.	2,912			
	San Isidro.	2,560			
	Baliuag.	4,296			
	San Rafael.	1,650	10		
	Angat.	5,441			
	San José.	219			
	Santa María de Pandi.	1,588	17		
	Bocaue.	2,550	88		2
	Marilao.	881	28	5	1
	Meycauayan.	2,375	46		
	Polo.	3,160	44		4
	Obando.	2,493			
Total		54,360	233	5	7

Felipe Bravo Census Demographics (Cagayan, 1818)
Province	Pueblo	Native Families	Spanish Filipino Families
Cagayan	Lal-lo, cabecera.	975	313
	Camalaniugan.	1,156	
	Piat y su visita.	899	
	Tabang..	201	
	Cabagan.	3,543	
	Malaveg con su visita Mabanaug.	524	
	Tuao..	1,393	
	Iguig y su visita Amulong.	403	
	Tuguegarao.	5,072	
	Aparri..	1,715	
	Abulug.	1,162	1
	San Juan y su visita Masi.	913	
	Nasiping y su visita Gataran.	573	
	Ilagan..	1,150	
	Gamú y su visita Furao.	586	16
	Tumauini.	827	
	Bugay..	299	
	Aritao..	580	
	Dupax.	867	6
	Bambang..	893	
	Bayombong.	771	
	Lumabang.	332	
	Bagabag y su Fuerza.	508	
	Carig y su Fortaleza el Sto. Niño.	305	
	Camarag.	488	
	Angadanan.	320	
	Cauayan.	318	
	Calaniugan.	135	
TOTAL		26,726	336

Felipe Bravo Census Demographics (Calamianes, 1818)
Province	Pueblo	Native Families	Spanish Filipino Families
Islas de Calamianes
Calamianes	Culion en la de Calamianes, Isla de Linacapan, e Isla de Coron.	1,044	2
Isla de Paragua
	Taytay, Silanga, Meitejet, Pancol, Guinlo, y Barbacan.	1,424	4
Islas de Dumaran y Agutay
	Isla y pueblo de Dumaran e Isla y pueblo de Agutay.	632	
Islas de Cuyo
	Isla y pueblo de Cuyo y su anejo, Canipo, e Isla de Pagaguayan.	2,430	25
TOTAL		5,530	31

Felipe Bravo Census Demographics (Camarines, 1818)
Province	Pueblo	Native Families	Spanish Filipino Families	Lacandula Families	Negro Filipinos	Chinese Filipinos
Partido de Vicol (Ciudad de Nueva-Caceres)
Camarines	Tabaco y Santa Cruz.	3,593	301		4	3
	Naga.	956				
	Camaligan.	1,388				
	Canaman.	1,589				
	Magarao ó Mangarao.	1,862				
	Bombom ó Bonbon.	1,245				
	Quipayo.	784				
	Calabanga.	1,174				
	Libmanan ó Libnanan.	1,490	1			
	Milaor.	1,902	7			
	San Fernando.	688	2			
	Minalabag.	901				
Partido de la Rinconada
	Bula.	471				
	Bao ó Baao.	1,538	37		4	
	Nabua.	2,612	2		2	
	Iriga.	2,040	1			
	Buhi ó Buji.	1,979	10			
	Bato.	495				
Partido de la Iriga
	Libon.	410	4			
	Polangui.	2,903	15			
	Ors ú Oas.	3,614				
	Ligao.	2,968	24			
	Guinobatan.	2,605	1			
	Camalig.	2,330	39		9	
	Cagsava.	2,870				
Monte Isaroc
	Pueblo y Mision de Manguirin.	160			629	
	Goa, Tigabon y Tinambag.	1,123		2	625	
Partido de la Contra-Costa
	Sipocot, Lupi y Ragay.	406				
	Daet.	1,449	26		10	
	Talisay.	1,055	2			
	Indan.	675	6			
	Paracale.	697	34			
	Mambulao.	950				
	Capalonga.	137			4	
TOTAL		50,762	512	2	1,287	3

Felipe Bravo Census Demographics (Capiz, 1818)
Province	Pueblo	Native Families	Spanish Filipino Families	Lacandula Families	Negro Filipino families	Chinese Filipino families
Capiz	Capiz y su visita Ibisan.	2,650				
	Panay.	2,275				
	Panitan.	1,485				
	Dumalag y sus visitas Dao y Tapas.	3,158				
	Dumarao.	2,600				
	Mambusao y sus visitas Sigma y Jamindan.	1,924	13			
	Batan y su visita Sapiang.	2,255	56			
	Banga y su visita Madalag.	1,579	8			
	Malinao.	1,487	11			
	Calibo y su visita Macao.	2,700	167			
	Ibajay.	1,268	30			
Isla de Romblon
	Romblon.	1,514	15			
Isla de Sibuyan
	Cauit, Pagalar, y Cajidiocan.	1,114				
Isla de Banton
	Banton.					
Isla de Tablas
	Guintinguian, Aghagacay, Odiongan, Lanan, y Loog.					
Isla de Simara
	San José, Coloncolon.					
Isla del Maestre de Campo
	Sibali.					
TOTAL		26,009	285			

Felipe Bravo Census Demographics (Caraga, 1818)
Province	Pueblo	Native Families	Spanish Filipino Families	Lacandula Families	Negro Filipino families	Chinese Filipino families
Distrito de Surigao y Siargao
Caraga	Surigao (cabecera), Tagauan, Gigaquit ó Higaguit, Cabubungan, Isla y pueblo de Dinagat, Caco en la isla de Siargao, Dapa en dicha isla, Cabuntug en la misma isla, Sapao en la citada isla.	2,475	25			
Distrito de Butuan y Talacogon
	Butuan, Habungan, Tabay, Maynio, Talacogon.	1,593	10			
Distrito de Cantilan y Mision de San Juan
	Lutao, Hingoog, Cantilan, Tago, Tandac, Lianga y la Mision de San Juan.	1,155				
Distrito de Bislic y Mision de Caraga
	Jinatuan, Bislic, Catel, Bagangan y la Mision de Caraga.	955				
TOTAL		6,178	35			

Felipe Bravo Census Demographics (Cavite, 1818)
Province	Pueblo	Native Families	Spanish Filipino Families	Lacandula Families	Negro Filipino families	Morenos	Chinese Filipino families
Cavite	Plaza y puerto de Cavite.	221	153			5	100
	San Roque.	3,906	443			3	35
	Cavite viejo.	1,855	55				4
	Bacood ó Bacor.	1,729	19				4
	San Francisco de Malabon.	1,510	69				3
	Santa Cruz de Malabon.	2,090	3			1	2
	Pueblo y Hacienda de Nait.	942	3			4	2
	Marigondon.	2,043					3
	Indan.	2,759	36				2
	Silang.	2,255	6			1	4
	Imus.	2,015	125				5
TOTAL		21,325	912			14	164

Felipe Bravo Census Demographics (Cebu, 1818)
Province	Pueblo	Native Families	Spanish Filipino Families	Lacandula Families	Negro Filipino families	Chinese Filipino families
Isla de Cebu
Cebu	Cabecera, El Sto. Nombre de Jesus.	868	255			
	Parian, Yutaos y Sogod con la visita de este, Simugui.	1,795	109			
	San Nicolás y sus visits Talisay, Lipata, Tansan, y Pitao.	2,420				
	Opon y Talamban.	2,850				
	Mandave ó Mandaui.	2,729	20			
	Danao y Catmon.	2,656	57			
	Barili y sus visitas Duman, Jod, Malhual, Coston, Badian y Taiuran.	1,943	14			
	Samboan y sus visitas Jiratilan, Malabuyot, y Taburan.	2,496	69			
	Bolojon y sus visitas Tayon, Calob, Mambuji y Yunan.	2,420				
	Dalaguete.	2,556				
	Argao y Carcar.	3,250				
Isla de Bantayan
	Bantayan y sus visitas Octon y Davis, Daan, Bantayan y sus visits Sogod y Cavit.	2,169	75			
Isla de Siquijor
	Siquijor y su visita Canoan.	2,450	46			
Isla de Bohol
	Inabangan y sus visitas Pampan, Corte, Taoran, Canogon, Tubigon, Ipil, Talibon, Tabigui, Inbay, y Cabulao.	1,815	41			
	Gindulman y sus visitas Quimale y Cugton.	1,500	6			
	Jagna.	3,255				
	Dimiao.	2,016				
	Loay.	1,614	5			
	Lobog y su anejo S. Isidro.	3,852				
	Baclayon.	3,549	5			
	Tagbilaran.	2,370	2			
	Pimin-vitan.	1,414				
	Malabohoo.	2,269				
	Loon y su visita Catarbacan.	1,990				
	Calape y sus visitas Bintig y Mondoog.	1,932				
Isla de Davis
	Davis.	2,055	9			
	Panglao.	1,350				
Isla de Camotes
	Poro y sus visitas (administración de Mandave).					
TOTAL		60,305	638			

Felipe Bravo Census Demographics (Ilocos Norte, 1818)
Province	Pueblo	Native Families	Spanish Filipino Families	Lacandula Families	Negro Filipino families	Chinese Filipino families
Ilocos Norte	Bangui.	1,449	5			
	Nagpartian.	423				
	Pasuquin.	1,530				
	Bacarra.	4,901				
	Vintar.	2,064				
	Sarrat ó San Miguel de Cuning.	2,755				
	Pigdig y su visita Santiago.	4,015				
	Dingras.	4,559				
	Laoag.	12,055				
	San Nicolás.	3,498				
	Batac.	7,026				
	Paoay.	7,447				
	Badoc.	3,356				
TOTAL		55,078	5			

Felipe Bravo Census Demographics (Ilocos Sur, 1818)
Province	Pueblo	Native Families	Spanish Filipino Families	Lacandula Families	Negro Filipino families	Chinese Filipino families
Ilocos Sur	Sinait.	2,625				
	Cabugao.	3,595				
	Lapoc.	1,791				
	Masingal.	2,740				
	Bantay y su visita San Ildefonso.	5,535				
	Santo Domingo.	2,912	36			
	San Vicente Ferrer.	2,113	10			
	Santa Catalina.	4,292				
	Vigan.	6,849	421			14
	Santa Catalina V. y M.	1,750				
	Narvacan.	4,185				
	Santa Maria.	2,985				
	San Esteban.	819				
	Santiago.	1,023				
	Candong.	5,709				
	Santa Lucia y su visita Santa Cruz con la mision de Ronda.	3,690				
	Tagudin y Ous.	2,620				
	Mision llamada Sevilla.					
	Mision de Argaguinan.					
	Bangas y sus misiones.	2,582				
	Villa-Cruz y San Rafael.					
	Namacpacan.	2,564				
	Balaoan.	2,703				
Distrito del Abra
	Tayum en el Abra.	1,307	4			
	Bangued en idem.	1,836	9			
TOTAL		61,397	530			14

Felipe Bravo Census Demographics (Iloilo, 1818)
Province	Pueblo	Native Families	Spanish Filipino Families	Lacandula Families	Negro Filipino families	Chinese Filipino families
Iloilo	Iloilo (cabecera) y Guimaras.	1,594	103			
	Molo.	3,457	23			
	Mandurrio.	5,966				
	Barotac, Asuy y Batag.	1,200				
	Ooton.	5,395				
	Tigbauan.	3,248				
	Guimbal y Tabungan.	4,209				
	Miagao.	4,096				
	San Joaquin.	1,180				
	Igbaras.	3,329				
	Camando.	1,974				
	Alimodian y San Miguel.	4,230				
	Ma-asin.	2,880				
	Cabatuan.	6,470				
	Xaro.	6,871				
	Santa Bárbara.	3,600				
	Janiuay.	4,158				
	Lambuso.	1,040				
	Calinog.	960				
	Pasi y Abaca.	2,637				
	Laglag y Diale.	2,252				
	Pototan.	3,000				
	Dumangas, Anilao, Banate y Barotac.	3,200				
TOTALS		77,862	126			

Felipe Bravo Census Demographics (Laguna, 1818)
Province	Pueblo	Native Families	Spanish Filipino Families	Lacandula Families	Negro Filipino families	Morenos	Chinese Filipino families
Laguna	Pagsanjan, cabecera.	4,785	7				
	Lumban.	1,983					
	Paete.	1,088					
	Longos con su anejo San Antonio del Monte.	944					
	Paquil.	628					
	Panguil.	1,030					
	Siniloan.	1,911					
	Mavitac.	525					
	Santa Maria Caboan.	257					
	Cavioli.	854					
	Majayjay.	4,948					
	Lilio.	2,168					
	Nagcarlan.	2,557					
	Santa Cruz.	2,528					
	Bay.	668					
	Pueblo y hacienda de Calauang.	610	2				
	Pila.	1,117	3				
	Los Baños.	460					5
	Calamba.	959	4				15
	Cabuyao.	1,755			1		14
	Santa Rosa.	1,760					9
	Biñan.	2,598	8		2	2	
	San Pedro Tunasau.	1,112	2			1	
	Pililla.	1,096					
	Tanay.	1,352					
	Binangonan de Bay.	1,234					
	Moron.	1,747					
	Baras.	486	3				
	Pueblo y hacienda de Angono.	513	2		2	3	
TOTAL		40,239	34		5	6	41

Felipe Bravo Census Demographics (Leyte, 1818)
Province	Pueblo	Native Families	Spanish Filipino Families	Lacandula Families	Negro Filipino families	Chinese Filipino families
Leyte	Taclovan (cabecera) y Palo.	2,290	11			
	Tanauan.	2,155	29			
	Dulag y Abuyog.	2,229	14			
	Barayuen, Haro y Alang-alang.	864				
	Barugo y San Miguel.	626				
	Carigara y su visita Leyte.	2,253				
	Palompon, Ogmug y Baybay.	826				
	Hilongos, Bato, Matalom, y Cajanguaan.	1,231	2			
	Indan, Dagami, e Isla de Panamao.	1,978				
Islas de Biliran y Maripipi
	Biliran, Isla de Maripipi, y Maripipi.	538				
Isla de Panahon y Costa Sur
	Isla de Panahon, Ma-asin, Sogod, Cabalian, y Liloan.	1,450				
TOTALES		16,244	56			

Felipe Bravo Census Demographics (Mariana Islands, 1818)
Provinces	Pueblos	Native Citizens	Spanish Citizen
Marianas Islands	(Across the Province in General)	7,555	160

Felipe Bravo Census Demographics (Mindoro, 1818)
Province	Pueblo	Number of Native Families	Number of Spanish Filipino Families	Lacandula Families	Negro Filipino families	Morenos	Chinese Filipino families
Mindoro	Calapan (cabecera) y sus anejos Baco, Sabuan, Abra de Ilog y Dongon.	970	8				
	Naujan y sus anejos Pola, Pinamalayan, Mamalay, Manaol, Bulalacao, Bongabon, Manjao, Manguirin y la Isla de Ilin.	924	6				
Isla de Marinduque
	Santa Cruz de Napo.	1,600	1				
	Boac.	1,908	31		4		
	Gazan.	316	1		1		
Isla de Luban
	Luban.	1,699					
TOTAL		7,455	47		5		

Felipe Bravo Census Demographics (Misamis)
Province	Pueblo	Number of Native Families	Number of Spanish Filipino Families	Lacandula Families	Negro Filipino families	Morenos	Chinese Filipino families
Partido de Misamis
Misamis	Plaza y presidio de Misamis, y su anejo Loculan.	334					
	Presidio de Iligan, con su anejo Initao.	169					
Partido de Dapitan
	Dapitan, y su visita San Lorenzo de Ilaya.	666	2				
	Lobungan, y sus visitas Dipolog, Piao, Dohinog, y Dicayo.	701					
Partido de Cagayan
	Cagayan, y sus visitas Iponau, Mulingan, Agusan, Cagaloan, Lasaan, Balingasay, Salay, Quinoquitan ó Bacay, Mubijut, y la Mision de Pinangudan.	3,177	1				
Isla de Camiguin (Partido de Catarman)
	Catarman, y sus visitas Mambujao, Guinsiliban, y Sagay.	1,693	35				
TOTAL		6,740	38				

Felipe Bravo Census Demographics (Samar, 1818)
Provinces	Pueblos	Native Families	Spanish Filipino Families	Negrito Families	Chinese Filipino Families
Samar	Samar island, in general.	16,671	174		

Felipe Bravo Census Demographics (Zamboanga, 1818)
Provinces	Pueblos	Native Citizens	Spanish Filipino Soldiers	Kapampangan Soldiers	Spanish and Mexican Citizens
Zamboanga	Zamboanga-province and peninsula .	8,640	300	100	A very large but unknown amount of the civilian population, they are mostly employed in the navy and shipping.

The current modern-day Chinese Filipinos are mostly the descendants of immigrants from Southern Fujian in China from the 20th century and late 19th century, possibly numbering around 2 million, although there are an estimated 27 percent of Filipinos who have partial Chinese ancestry, stemming from precolonial and colonial Chinese (Sangley) migrants from the past centuries especially during the Spanish Colonial Era. Intermarriage between the groups is evident in the major cities and urban areas, and spans back to Spanish colonial times, where a colonial middle-class group known as the Mestizo de Sangley (Chinese mestizos) descend from. Its descendants during the late 19th century produced a major part of the ilustrado intelligentsia of the late Spanish Colonial Philippines, that were very influential with the creation of Filipino nationalism and the sparking of the Philippine Revolution. In 2013, according to the Senate of the Philippines, there were approximately 1.35 million ethnic (or pure) Chinese within the Philippine population, while Filipinos with any Chinese descent comprised 22.8 million of the population.

The Philippines was a former American colony and during the American colonial era, there were over 800,000 Americans who were born in the Philippines. As of 2013, there were 220,000 to 600,000 American citizens living in the country. In 2025, the number of Americans living in the Philippines increased to at least 750,000 forming 0.75% of the population and there are also 250,000 Amerasians scattered across the cities of Angeles City, Manila, and Olongapo, forming aboout 0.25% of the Philippine population. Together, both American and Amerasian people form 1% of the Philippines.

There are also Japanese people, which include escaped Christians (Kirishitan) who fled the persecutions of Shogun Tokugawa Ieyasu which the Spanish authorities in the Philippines had offered asylum from to form part of the Japanese settlement in the Philippines. In the 16th and 17th centuries, thousands of Japanese people traders also migrated to the Philippines and assimilated into the local population.

Practicing forensic anthropology, while exhuming cranial bones in several Philippine cemeteries, researcher Matthew C. Go estimated that 7% of the mean amount, among the samples exhumed, have attribution to European descent. Research work published in the Journal of Forensic Anthropology, collating contemporary Anthropological data show that the percentage of Filipino bodies who were sampled from the University of the Philippines, that is phenotypically classified as Asian (East, South, Southeast Asian) is 72.7%, Hispanic (Mixed Spanish-Indigenous American and Mixed Spanish-Asian) is at 12.7%, Indigenous American (Native American) at 7.3%, African at 4.5%, and European at 2.7%. However, this is only according to an interpretation of the data wherein the reference groups, which were cross checked to the Filipino samples; for the Hispanic category, were Mexican Americans, and the reference groups for the: European, African, and Indigenous American, categories, were: White Americans, Black Americans, and Native Americans from the USA, while the Asian reference groups were sourced from Chinese, Japanese, and Vietnamese origins. In contrast, a different anthropology study using Morphoscopic ancestry estimates in Filipino crania using multivariate probit regression models by J. T. Hefner, while analyzing Historic and Modern samples of Philippine skeletons, paint a different picture, in that, when the reference group for "Asian" was Thailand (Southeast Asians) rather than Chinese, Japanese, and Vietnamese; and the reference group for Hispanic was Colombians (South Americans) rather than Mexicans, the historical and modern sample results for Filipinos, yielded the following ratios: Asian at 48.6%, African at 32.9%, and only a small portion classifying as either European at 12.9%, and finally for Hispanic at 5.7%.

== Genetics ==
The results of a massive DNA study conducted by the National Geographic's "The Genographic Project", based on genetic testings of 80,000 Filipino people by the National Geographic in 2008–2009, found that the average Filipino's genes are around 53% Southeast Asian and Oceanian, 36% East Asian, 5% Southern European, 3% South Asian and 2% Native American.

== Moro ethnolinguistic groups ==
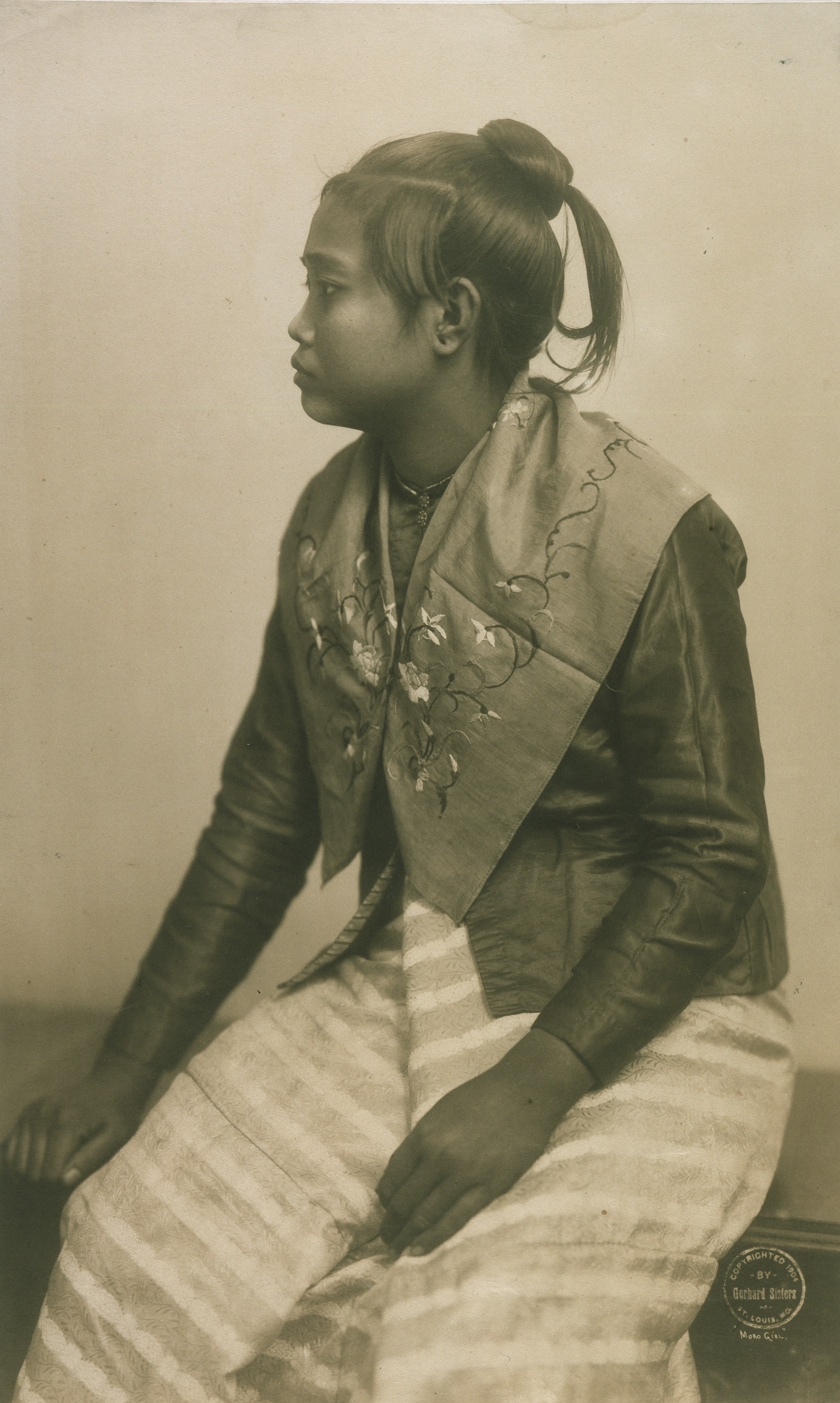
Moro woman (c. 1904)

A minority group comprise about 5% of the total Philippine population, or 5 million people. The collective term Moro people or Bangsamoro people refers to the, at least 13, islamicized ethnolinguistic groups of Mindanao, Sulu and Palawan. As Muslim-majority ethnic groups, they form the largest non-Christian majority population in the country, Most Moros are followers of Sunni Islam of the Shafi'i madh'hab. The Muslim Moros originally had a few independent states such as the Maguindanao Sultanate & Buayan Sultanate for Maguindanaon, the Lanao Sultanates for Maranao, and the Sulu Sultanate for Tausug. The Sultanate of Sulu once exercised sovereignty over the present day provinces of Basilan, Palawan, Sulu, Tawi-Tawi, the eastern part of the Malaysian state of Sabah (formerly North Borneo) and North Kalimantan in Indonesia.

=== Molbog ===
The Molbog (referred to in the literature as Molebugan or Molebuganon) are concentrated in southern Palawan, around Balabac, Bataraza, and are also found in other islands of the coast of Palawan as far north as Panakan. They are the only indigenous people in Palawan where the majority of its people are Muslims. The area constitutes the homeland of the Molbog people since the classical era prior to Spanish colonization. The Molbog are known to have a strong connection with the natural world, especially with the sacred pilandok (Philippine mouse-deer), which can only be found in the Balabac islands. The coconut is especially important in Molbog culture at it is their most prized agricultural crop. The word Malubog means "murky or turbid water". The Molbog are likely a migrant people from nearby Sabah, North Borneo. Based on their dialect and some socio-cultural practices, they seem to be related to the Orang Tidung or Tirum (Camucone in Spanish), an Islamized ethnolinguistic group native to the lower east coast of Sabah and upper East Kalimantan. They speak the Molbog language, which is related to Bonggi, spoken in Sabah, Malaysia. However, some Sama words (of the Jama Mapun variant) and Tausug words are found in the Molbog dialect after a long period of exposure with those ethnics. This plus a few characteristics of their socio-cultural life style distinguish them from the Orang Tidung. Molbog livelihood includes subsistence farming, fishing and occasional barter trading with the Moros and neighbouring ethnolinguistic groups in Sabah. In the past, both the Molbog and the Palawanon Muslims were ruled by Sulu datus, thus forming the outer political periphery of the Sulu Sultanate. Intermarriage between Tausug and the Molbog hastened the Islamization of the Molbog. The offsprings of these intermarriages are known as kolibugan or "half-breed".

=== Kolibugan Subanon ===
The Kolibugan resulted from the intermingling of the indigenous Subanon populations with the Muslim populations in the coastal areas of Zamboanga. Converted Subanons also created the Kolibugan. The population is concentrated along the western side of the provinces of both northern (6,495) and southern Zamboanga (3,270), and a national count of over 11,000. The concentrations are in Siocon (2,040), Sirawai (1,960), and Sibuco (1,520) (NSO 1980). The total population count is estimated at 32,227 (NM 1994). The generalized culture is lowland central Philippines focused on wet rice cultivation, and some localized swidden cultivation. Adaptation to the marine environment is made, but mostly in terms of domestic fishing.

=== Maranao ===
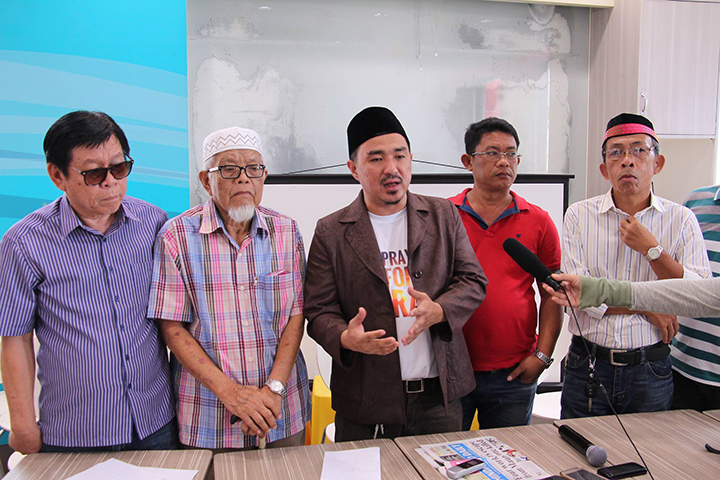
Lanao sultans

The Maranao people (Maranao: [ˈməranaw]; Filipino: Maranaw), also spelled Meranao, Maranaw, and Mëranaw, is the term used by the Philippine government to refer to the southern tribe who are the "people of the lake", a predominantly Muslim Lanao province region of the Philippine island of Mindanao. They are known for their artwork, weaving, wood, plastic and metal crafts and epic literature, the Darengen. They live around Lake Lanao, the ancestral homeland of the Maranao people. They are related to modern the Maguindanao and Iranun people. They speak the Maranao and live in the provinces of Lanao del Norte and Lanao del Sur. Because of the mass influx of Cebuano migrants to Mindanao, many Maranaos are also fluent in Cebuano. They also use Arabic as a liturgical language of Islam. Most Maranaos, however, do not know Arabic beyond its religious use. Some also know Chavacano, which is a Philippine Spanish Creole that gained popularity as a major language during the short-lived Republic of Zamboanga. Most Maranaos with part-Tausug or Yakan from Zamboanga and Basilan are conversant, specifically the Zamboanga dialect known as Zamboangueño.

=== Iranun/Ilanun ===
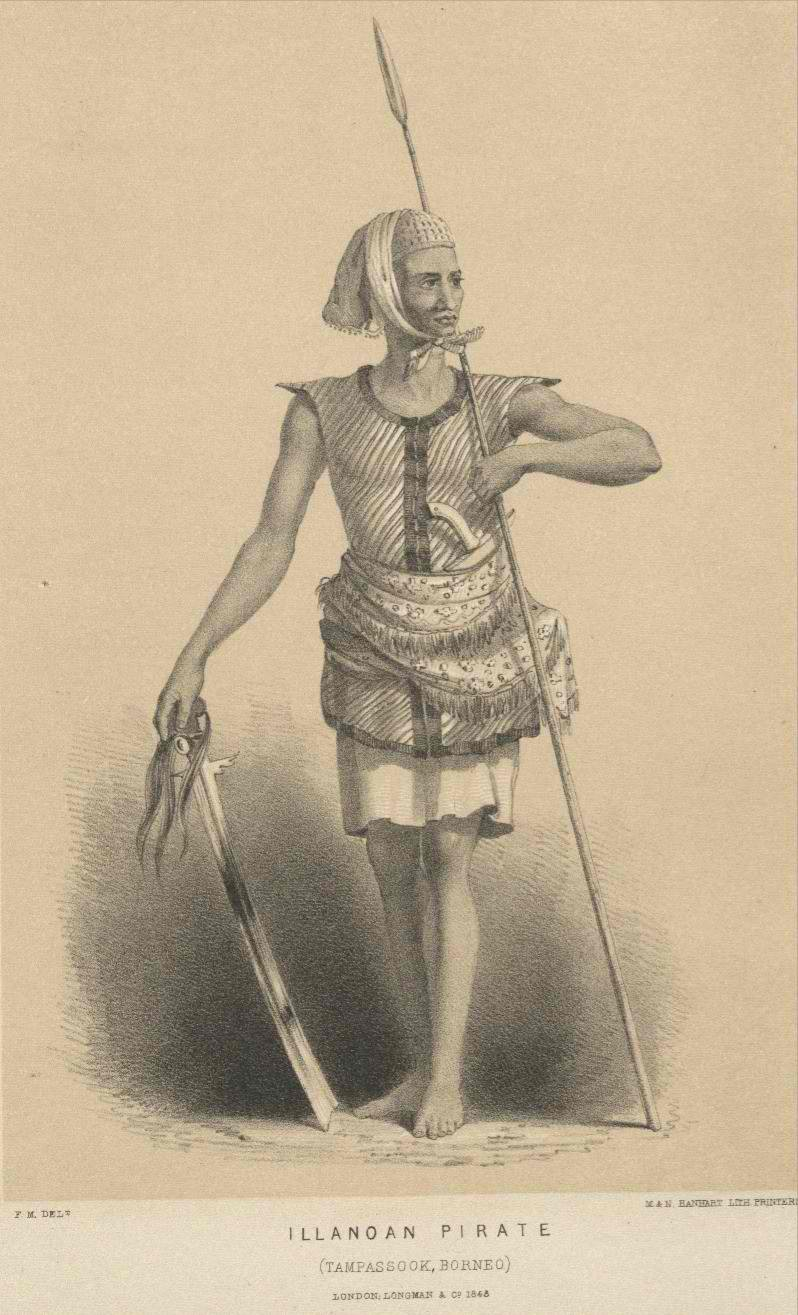
A 19th Century illustration of an Iranun pirate

The Iranun/Ilanun are a Moro ethnic group native to Mindanao, Philippines, and the west coast of Sabah. The modern Iranun are believed to be descendants of Maranao who left Lake Lanao and settled elsewhere. These migrations were usually of merchant clans of the Maranao which established trading routes near the coast. Some Iranun clans, however, are descendants of outcast clans that left Lake Lanao after one of their clan members committed a murder. For several centuries, the Iranuns in the Philippines formed part of the Sultanate of Maguindanao. In the past, the seat of the Maguindanao Sultanate was situated at Lamitan and Malabang. Both of which were the strongholds of the Iranun society. Iranuns fought the Western invaders under the flag of the Maguindanao Sultanate. They formed part of the Moro resistance against the US occupation of the Philippines from 1899 to 1913. The Iranun were excellent in maritime activity as they are traditionally sailors and pirates. They used to ply the route connecting the Sulu Sea, Moro Gulf to Celebes Sea, and raided the Spanish held territories along the way.

=== Maguindanaon ===
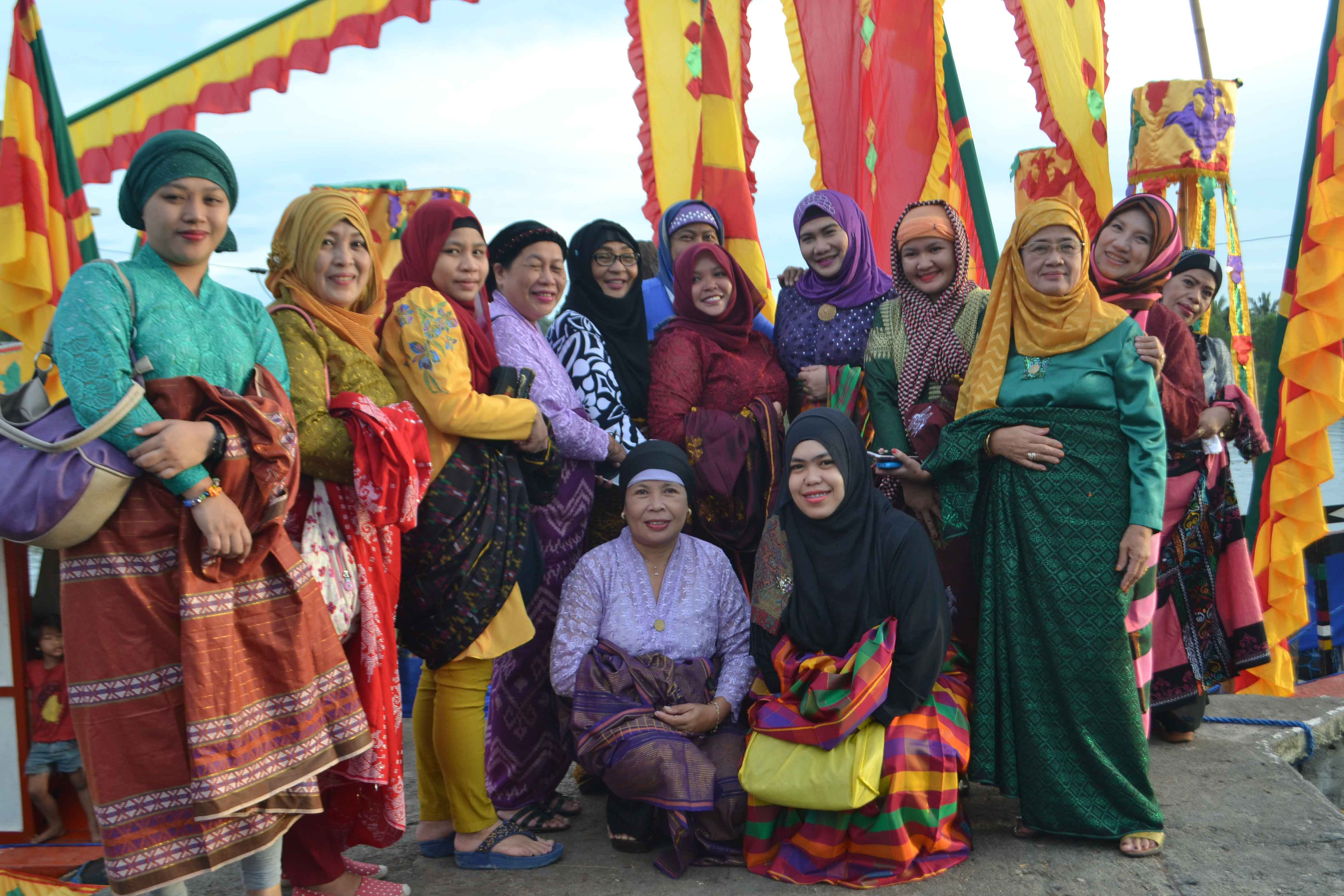
Guinakit Fluvial Parade in 2016

The Maguindanao people are the historical people of the Sultanate of Maguindanao. The word Maguindanao or Magindanaw means "people of the flood plains", from the word Magi'inged, which means "people or citizen", and danaw, which means "lake or marsh". Thus Maguindanao or Magindanaw can also be translated as "people of the lake", identical to their closely related neighbors, the Maranao and Iranun. These three groups speak related languages belonging to the Danao language family.They live primarily in Maguindanao, Soccsksargen, Davao Region and Zamboanga Peninsula and speak Maguindanaon with second languages as Hiligaynon, Cebuano, Tagalog and Arabic and/or English. Because of the mass influx of Cebuano and Hiligaynon migrants to Mindanao, many of the Maguindanao people tend to be exposed to the Cebuano or Hiligaynon languages from Visayas easily enough to be able to speak it. Arabic is spoken by a minority of the Moro people, being the liturgical language of Islam. Some also speak Chabacano, which is a Philippine Spanish Creole that gained popularity as a major language during the Spanish rule and during the short-lived Republic of Zamboanga, most specifically Cotabateño dialect, spoken in Cotabato City.

=== Sangil/Sangirese ===
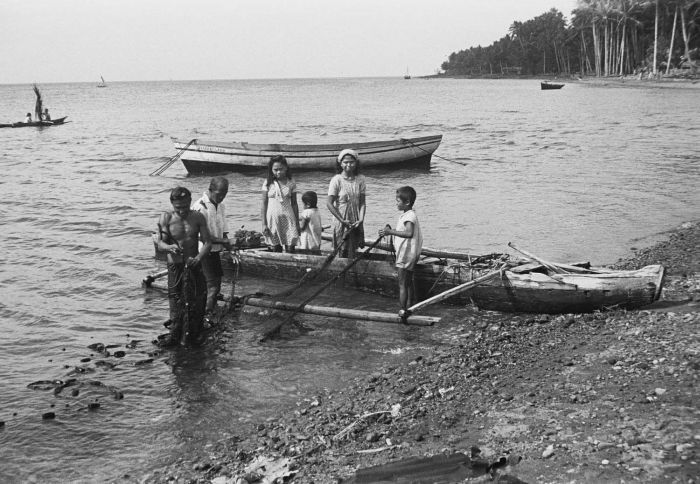
Sangihe fishermen's family

The Sangil people (also called Sangir, Sangu, Marore, Sangirezen, or Talaoerezen) are originally from the Sangihe and Talaud Islands (now part of Indonesia) and parts of Davao Occidental (particularly in the Sarangani Islands), Davao del Norte, Davao del Sur, Sultan Kudarat, South Cotabato, and Cotabato. Their populations (much like the Sama-Bajau) were separated when borders were drawn between the Philippines and Indonesia during the colonial era. The Sangil people are traditionally animistic, much like other Lumad peoples. During the colonial era, the Sangil (who usually call themselves "Sangir") in the Sangihe Islands mostly converted to Protestant Christianity due to proximity and contact with the Christian Minahasa people of Sulawesi. In the Philippines, most Sangil converted to Islam due to the influence of the neighboring Sultanate of Maguindanao. However, elements of animistic rituals still remain. The Indonesian and Filipino groups still maintain ties and both Manado Malay and Cebuano are spoken in both Indonesian Sangir and Filipino Sangil, in addition to the Sangirese language. The exact population of Sangil people in the Philippines is unknown, but is estimated to be around 10,000 people. Indonesian Sangir live in the Philippines, particularly Balut Island, Davao del Sur, Davao del Norte, Davao Oriental, Sarangani, Sultan Kudarat, Cotabato, South Cotabato, General Santos and Davao City, because of its proximity to Indonesia; they speak Cebuano & Tagalog as second languages & are Protestant Christians by faith.

=== Yakan ===
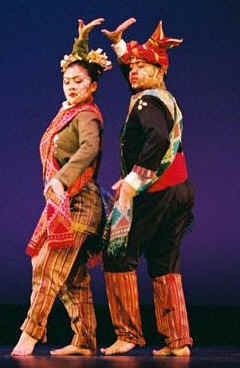
Filipino Americans portraying the traditional makeup and attire of a newlywed Yakan couple

The Yakan people are among the major indigenous Filipino ethnolinguistic groups in the Sulu Archipelago. Having a significant number of followers of Islam, the Yakans are included among the 13 Moro groups in the Philippines. The Yakans mainly reside in Basilan but are also in Zamboanga City. They speak a language known as Bissa Yakan, which has characteristics of both Sama-Bajau Sinama and Tausug. It is written in the Malayan Arabic script, with adaptations to sounds not present in Arabic. Yakans speak Chabacano, which is the lingua franca of Basilan, the reason of easier adaptation to the society of Zamboanga City. Because of the mass influx of Cebuano migrants to Mindanao, many of the Yakans also tend to be exposed to the Cebuano language from Visayas easily enough to be able to speak it. The Yakan have a traditional horse culture. They are renowned for their weaving traditions.

=== Tausug ===
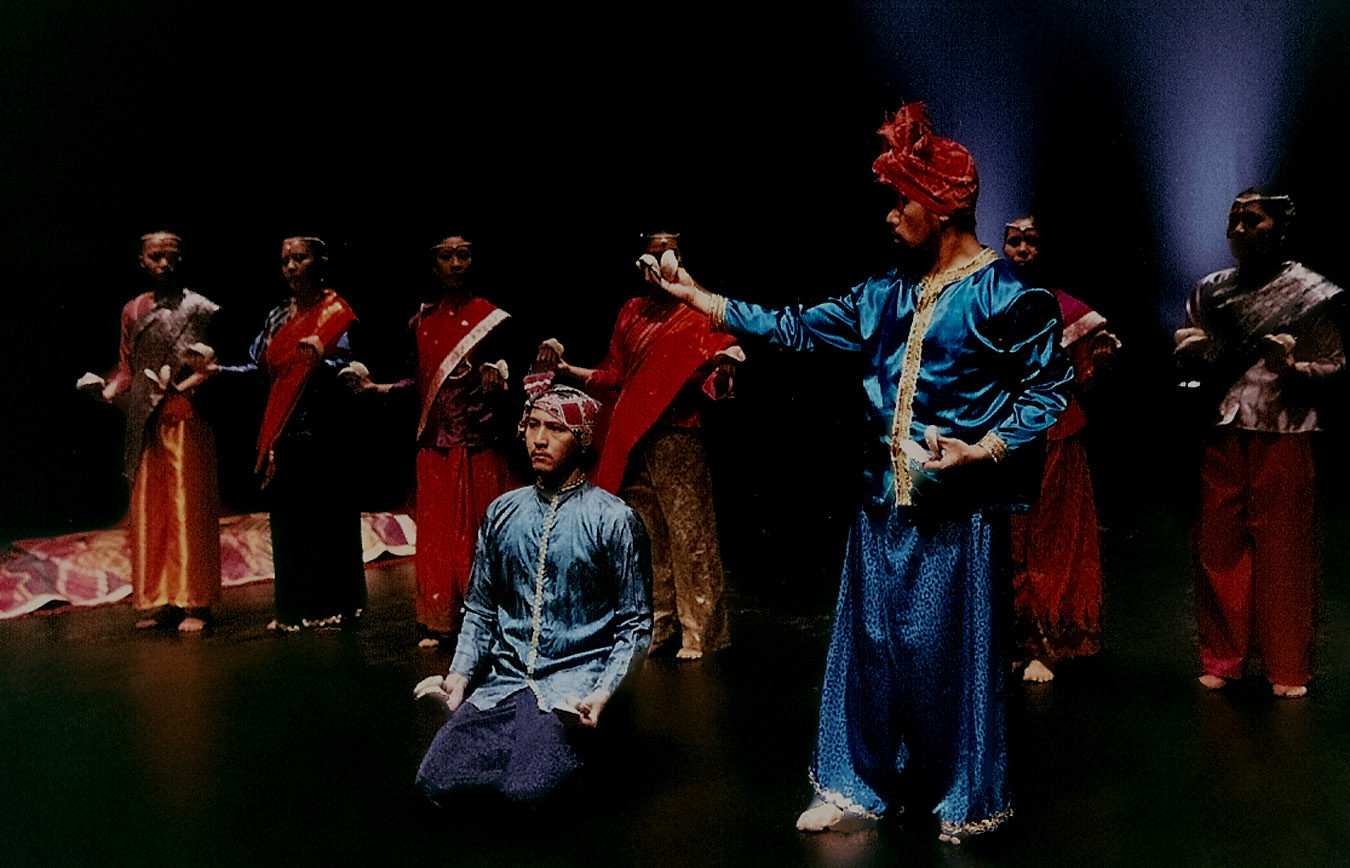
Tausug dance

The Tausūg people (known as Suluk in Sabah) are an ethnic group of the Philippines, Malaysia and Indonesia. The Tausūg are a Visayan subgroup that mostly converted to Islam in the late AD 1300s, and are closely related to the Surigaonon and Butuanon people. The Muslim Tausugs originally had an independent state known as the Sulu Sultanate, which once exercised sovereignty over the present day provinces of Sulu, coastal areas of Basilan, southern Palawan, Tawi-Tawi, some coastal areas of the Zamboanga Peninsula, and the eastern part of the Malaysian state of Sabah (formerly North Borneo) and North Kalimantan in Indonesia. "Tausug" means "the people of the current", from the word tau which means "man" or "people" and sūg (alternatively spelled sulug or suluk) which means "[sea] currents". This refers to their homelands in the Sulu Archipelago. The Tausūg in Sabah refer to themselves as Tausūg but refers to their ethnic group as "Suluk" as documented in official documents such as birth certificates in Sabah, which are written Malay. Because of the mass arrival of Cebuano settlers to Mindanao, many Tausug people are exposed in the Cebuano language easily enough to be able to speak it as Tausug & Cebuano languages belong to Visayan languages. Some Tausug in Sulu & Tawi-Tawi speak Chabacano, specifically the Zamboanga dialect; most of those fluent in Chabacano are residents of Basilan & Zamboanga City. Most Tausug in Sabah and North Kalimantan & some Tausug in Sulu Archipeago & south Palawan speak Sabah Malay.

=== Jama Mapun ===
The Jama Mapun are sometimes known by the exonyms 'Sama Mapun", "Sama Kagayan", or "Bajau Kagayan". They are part of the Sama-Bajau peoples. They are from the island of Mapun, Tawi-Tawi (formerly known as Cagayan de Sulu). Their culture is heavily influenced by the Sulu Sultanate. They are relatively isolated and do not usually consider themselves as Sama.

=== Banguingui ===
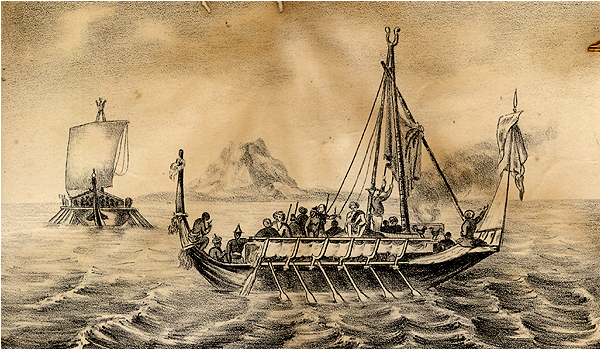
An 1850 depiction of garay warships used by Sulu pirates

Banguingui, also known as Sama Banguingui or Samal Banguingui (alternative spellings include Bangingi', Bangingi, Banguingui, Balanguingui, and Balangingi) is a distinct ethno-linguistic group dispersed throughout the Greater Sulu Archipelago and southern and western coastal regions of the Zamboanga Peninsula in Mindanao, Philippines. They are one of the ethnic groups usually collectively known as the Sama-Bajau peoples.

=== Sama Dea (Samal/Sama) ===
The Sama Dea (Samal/Sama) are part of the Sama-Bajau peoples, more accurately a general subgroup of "Land Sama" native to the Philippines. They are popularly known as Samal (also spelled "Siamal" or "Siyamal"), which is a Tausūg and Cebuano term that is sometimes considered offensive. Their preferred endonym is simply "Sama", but they can also be called as Sama Deya or Sama Darat. These are the Sama-Bajau which traditionally lived in island interiors. Some examples are the Sama Sibutu and the Sama Sanga-Sanga. They are usually farmers who cultivate rice, sweet potato, cassava, and coconuts for copra through traditional slash-and-burn agriculture (in contrast to the plow agriculture technology brought by the Tausūg). They are originally from the larger islands of Tawi-Tawi and Pangutaran. In the Philippines, the Sama Dea will often completely differentiate themselves from the Sama Dilaut. A large number are now residing around the coasts of northern Sabah, though many have also migrated north to the Visayas and southern Luzon. They are predominantly land-dwelling. They are the largest single group of Sama-Bajau. In Davao del Norte, the Island Garden City of Samal was possibly named after them. A 2021 genetic study show how the Sama has common ancestry with the Austroasiatic Mlabri and Htin peoples of mainland Southeast Asia.

=== Sama Bihing/Sama Lipid ===
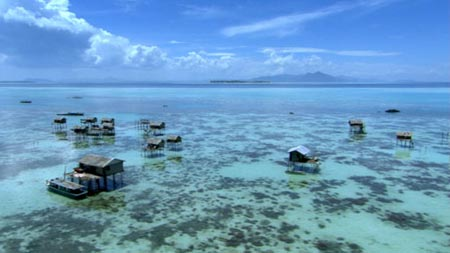
Bajau stilt houses

The Sama Bihing or Sama Lipid are also known as "shoreline Sama" or "littoral Sama". These are the Sama-Bajau which traditionally lived in stilt houses in shallows and coastal areas. An example is the Sama Simunul. They are originally from the larger islands of Tawi-Tawi. They have a more flexible lifestyle than the Sama-Gimba (Sama Dilaut Origin), and will farm when there is available land. They usually act as middlemen in trade between the Sama Dilaut and other land-based peoples.

=== Sama Dilaut (Bajau) ===
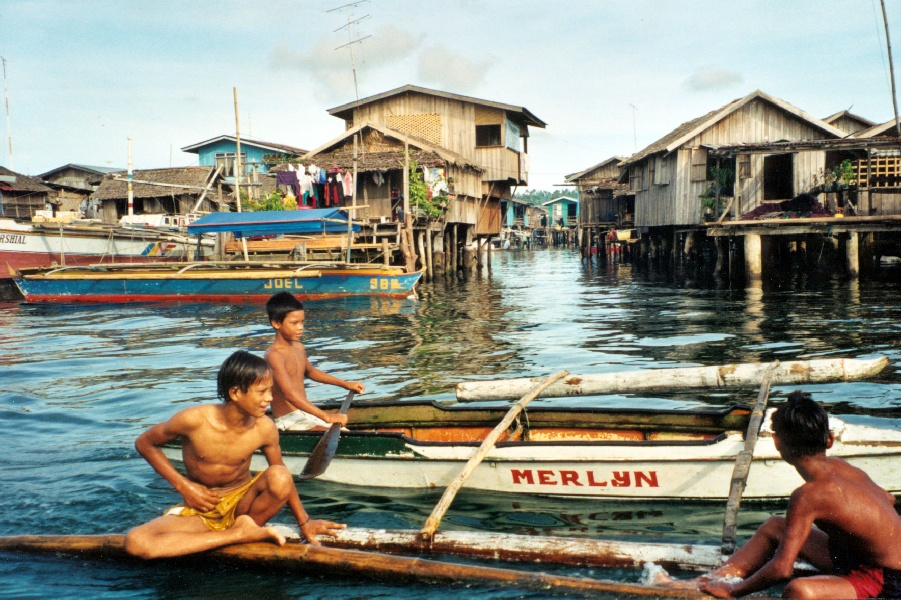
Basilan sea gypsies

The Sama Dilaut (Bajau) are part of the Sama-Bajau peoples and are the dominant ethnic group of the islands of Tawi-Tawi in the Philippines. They are known as the "sea Sama" or "ocean Sama". In the Philippines, they are more popularly known as the Bajau or Badjao / Bajaw, but their preferred ethnonym is Sama Dilaut or Sama Mandilaut / Sama Pala'u; while in Malaysia, they usually identify as Bajau Laut. This subgroup originally lived exclusively on elaborately crafted houseboats called lepa, but almost all have taken to living on land in the Philippines. Their home islands include Sitangkai and Bongao. They sometimes call themselves the "Sama To'ongan" (literally "true Sama" or "real Sama"), to distinguish themselves from the land-dwelling Sama-Bajau subgroups. They are also found in other islands of the Sulu Archipelago, coastal areas of Mindanao, northern and eastern Borneo, Sulawesi, and throughout eastern Indonesian islands. Within the last fifty years, many of the Filipino Sama-Bajau have migrated to neighbouring Malaysia and the northern islands of the Philippines, due to the conflict in Mindanao. A genetic study published in PNAS show that the Dilaut people of the Philippines have South Asian or Indian descent. As of 2010, they were the second-largest ethnic group in the Malaysian state of Sabah. Sama-Bajau have sometimes been called the "Sea Gypsies" or "Sea Nomads". They usually live a seaborne lifestyle, and use small wooden sailing vessels such as the perahu (layag in Meranau), djenging, balutu, lepa, pilang, and vinta (or lepa-lepa).

==== Moros with Arab ancestry ====
Arab traders first visited the Philippines during the precolonial era. They sailed through Southeast Asia, including the Philippines, for trade and commerce on their way to trade with China, just like Persian and Indian traders. These early Arab traders followed the pre-Islamic religions of Arabian Christianity, Paganism and Sabeanism. After the advent of Islam, in 1380, Karim ul' Makhdum, the first Islamic missionary to reach the Sulu Archipelago, brought Islam to what is now the Philippines, first arriving in Jolo. Subsequent visits of Arab Muslim missionaries strengthened the Islamic faith in the Philippines, concentrating in the south and reaching as far north as Manila. Starting with the conquest of Malaysia by the Portuguese and Indonesia by the Dutch, the Philippines began to receive a number of Malaysian-Arab refugees including several Malaysian princes and displaced court advisors. Soon, vast sultanates were established overlapping the existing indigenous Filipino barangay (village) governing system and Indianized royalty. The two largest were the Sultanate of Maguindanao, which loosely governed most of southern Mindanao and the Sultanate of Sulu, which included Basilan, Jolo, and parts of Borneo. Several other smaller but famous sultanates were also established such as the sultanates of Lanao in Mindanao, which was later conquered by the Spanish in the 16th century. The ties between the sultanates in Mindanao remained economically and culturally close to Indonesia, Brunei, and Malaysia until the end of the 19th century when the sultanates were weakened by the Spanish and later the American military during the Spanish and American colonial period. Today, there are numerous Arab-descended Filipino families, especially royal or noble Muslim families in Mindanao. In modern times, there has also been immigration from Arab countries in the Middle East, especially those recently devastated by war in the recent decades like Lebanon and Syria.

== Igorot ethnolinguistic groups ==
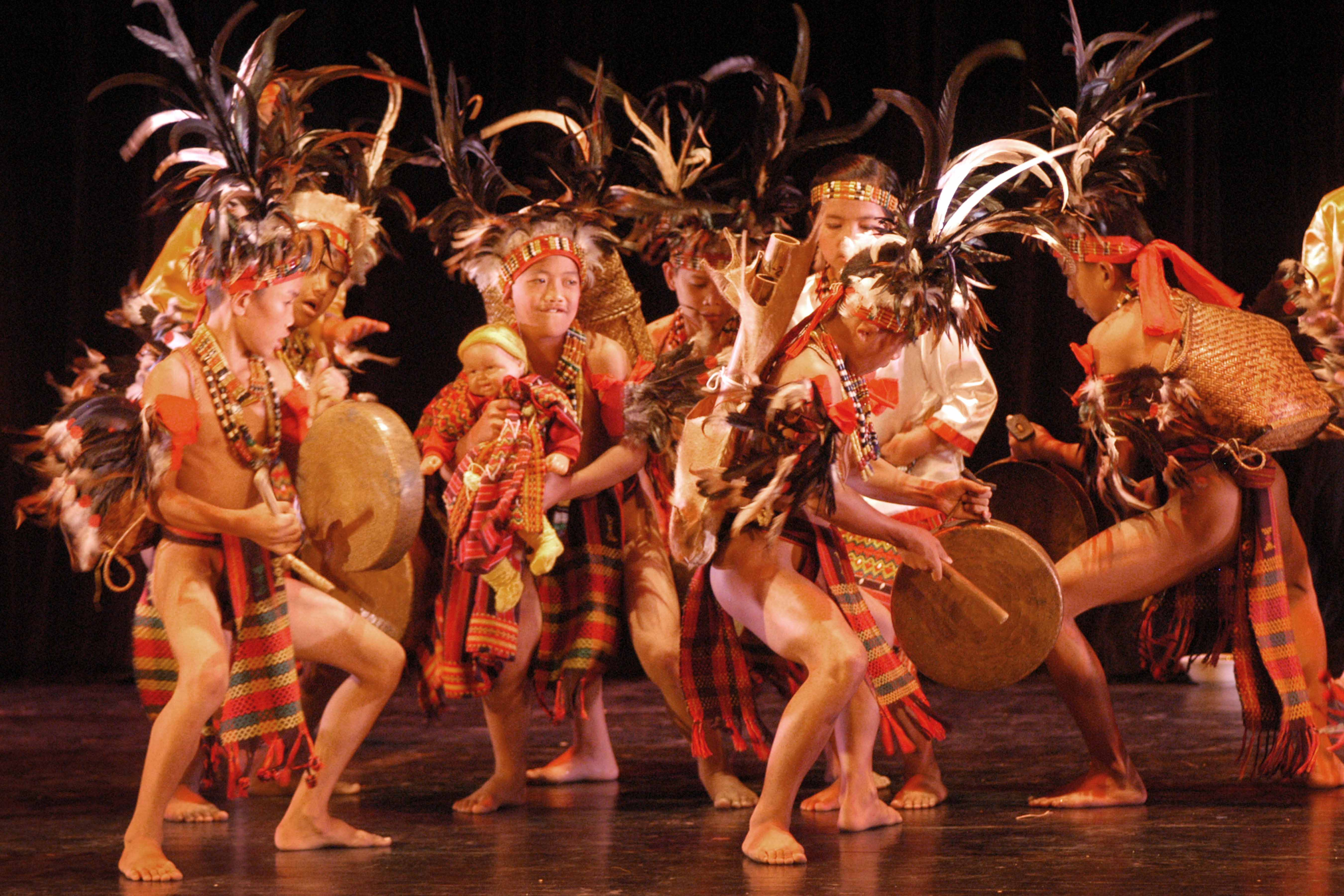
Ifugao dancers in traditional attire performing a cultural dance with gangsa (gongs).

The Igorot people, also referred to as Cordilleran peoples, are an indigenous ethnic group in the Philippines primarily inhabiting the Cordillera Mountain Range, as well as parts of the Caraballo Mountains and Sierra Madre in Northern Luzon. They are predominantly found in the Cordillera Administrative Region (CAR), with communities also present in Ilocos and Cagayan Valley regions. As of the early 21st century, their population is estimated to be around 1.8 million.

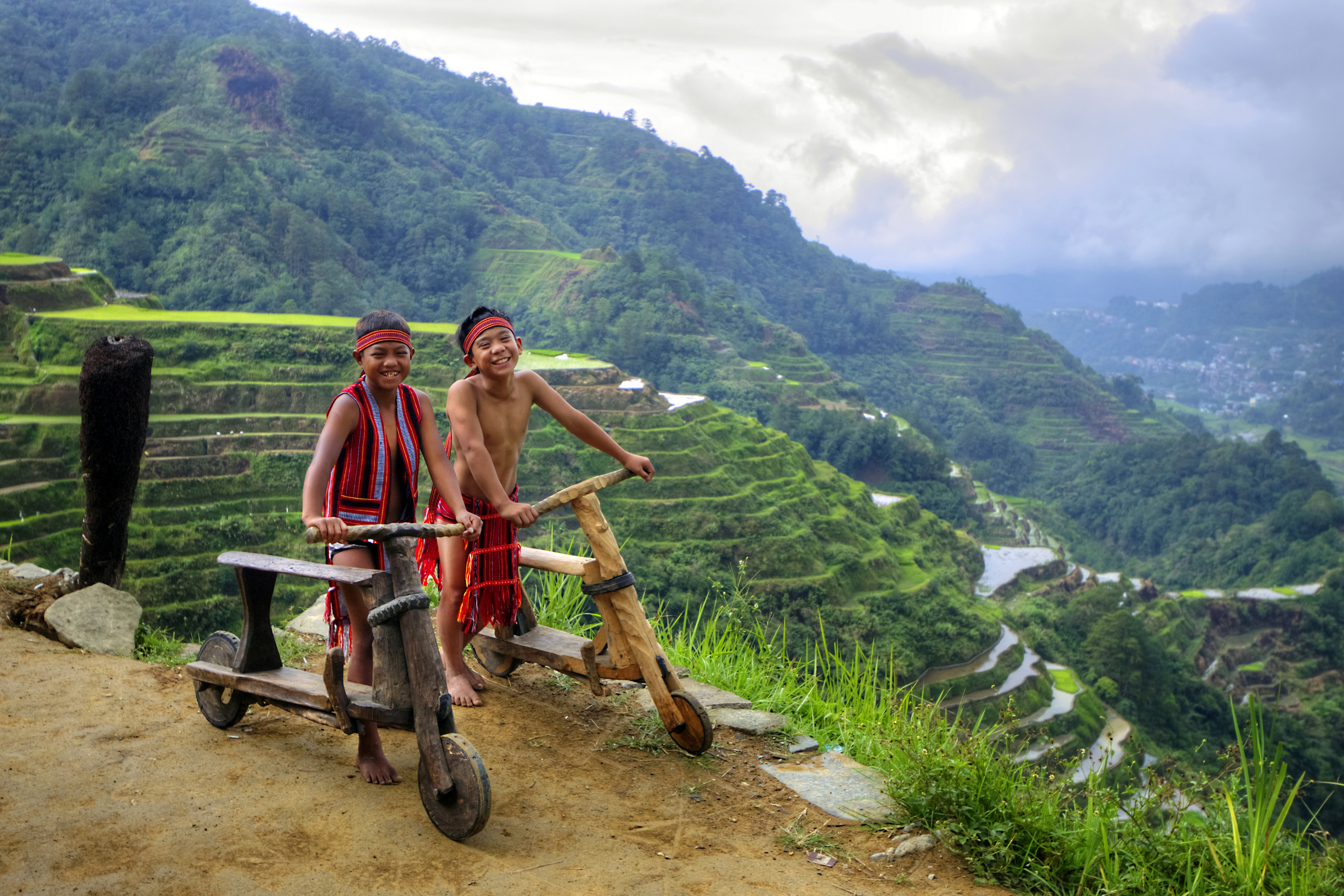
Banaue Rice Terraces, home to the Igorots, are often referred to as the "Eighth Wonder of the World."

The Igorot people are composed of 10 main ethnolinguistic groups, whose languages belong to the Northern Luzon subgroup of the Austronesian (Malayo-Polynesian) language family. The term Igorot originates from the root word golot, meaning "mountain," with Igolot referring to "people from the mountains." Historically, the Igorots have been distinguished by their rice terrace farming traditions, particularly in the south, central, and western areas, while groups in the east and north have traditionally engaged in other forms of subsistence.

=== Bontoc ===
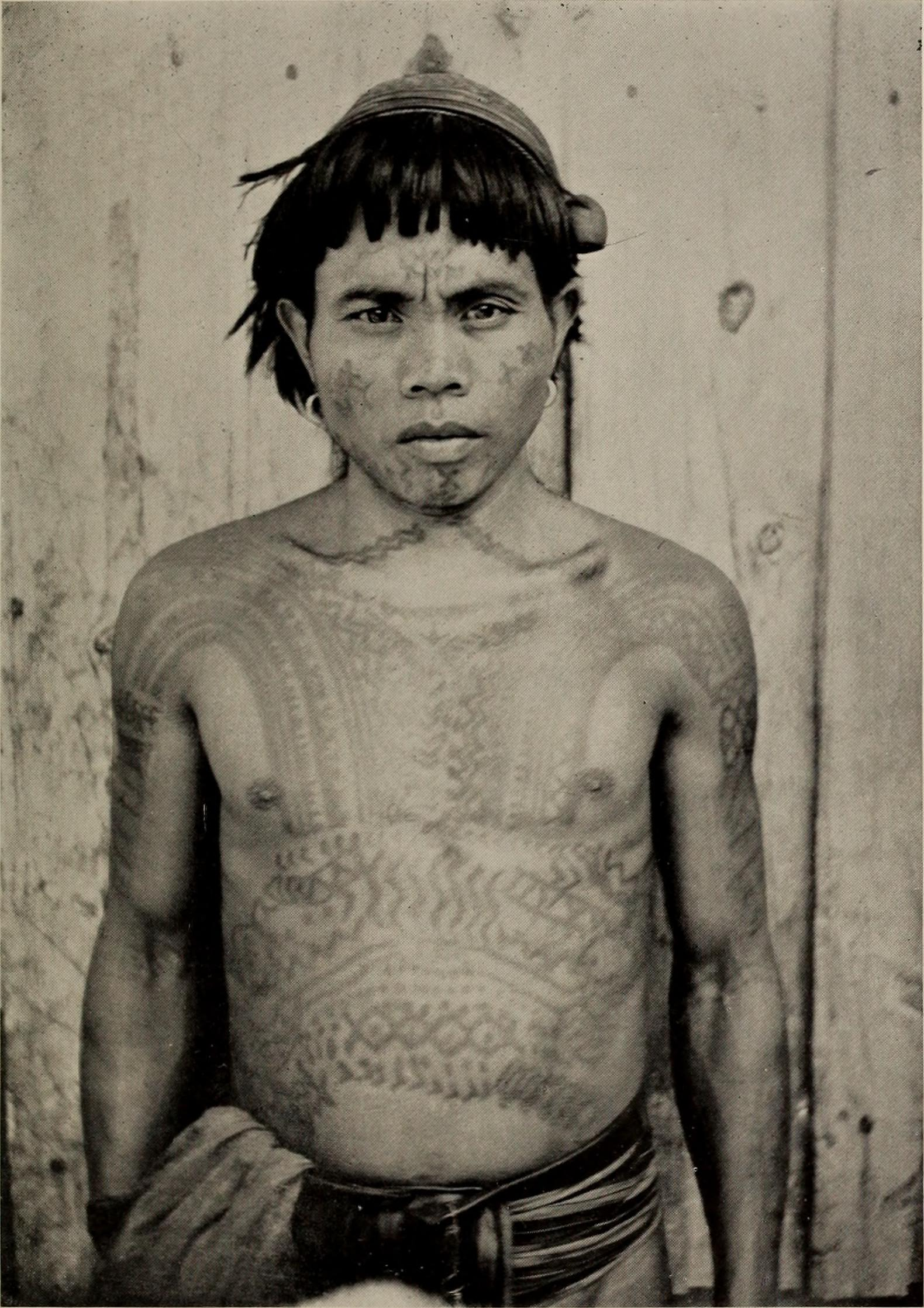
A Bontoc man with elaborate tattoos, c. 1903

The Bontoc live on the banks of the Chico River in the Central Mountain Province on the island of Luzon. They speak Bontoc and Ilocano. They formerly practiced head-hunting and had distinctive body tattoos. Present-day Bontocs are a peaceful agricultural people who have, by choice, retained most of their traditional culture despite frequent contacts with other groups. The Bontoc social structure used to be centered around village wards (ato) containing about 14 to 50 homes. Traditionally, young men and women lived in dormitories and ate meals with their families. This gradually changed with the advent of Christianity. In general, however, it can be said that all Bontocs are very aware of their own way of life and are not overly eager to change.

=== Balangao ===
The Balangao (endonym: iFarangao) predominantly inhabit the municipality of Natonin and portions of Paracelis in the eastern Mountain Province. While early colonial literature often conflated the Balangao with the neighboring Bontoc or Kalinga based on broad geographic generalizations, modern linguistic and cultural evidence identifies them as a distinct group with an independent ethnogenesis. Anthropological mapping from the early 20th century, notably by Albert Jenks (1905), explicitly defined the "Bontoc Culture Area" as centered on the Chico River, excluding the eastern territories that comprise the Balangao heartland. Both groups maintain distinct territorial boundaries and do not historically claim common tribal affiliation. The Balangao language is classified as a primary branch of the Nuclear Cordilleran group, making it a sister branch to the Bontoc, Kankanaey, and Ifugao complexes. According to the Northern Luzon languages family tree, this divergence represents an early split within the Central Cordilleran subgroup rather than a recent migration or dialectal variation. Balangao material culture is morphologically distinct from its western neighbors. Women wear the petay, a wrap-around skirt featuring alternating indigo and red horizontal stripes. Men wear the teyay, a vibrant red loincloth distinguished by yellow horizontal strips. The traditional communal dance, the torayan, is characterized by an accelerated, high-energy rhythmic beat and a rigid "T-pose" posture. This contrasts with the more fluid "eagle dances" or bird-mimicry performances common among the Bontoc and Kalinga tribes.

=== Ibaloi ===
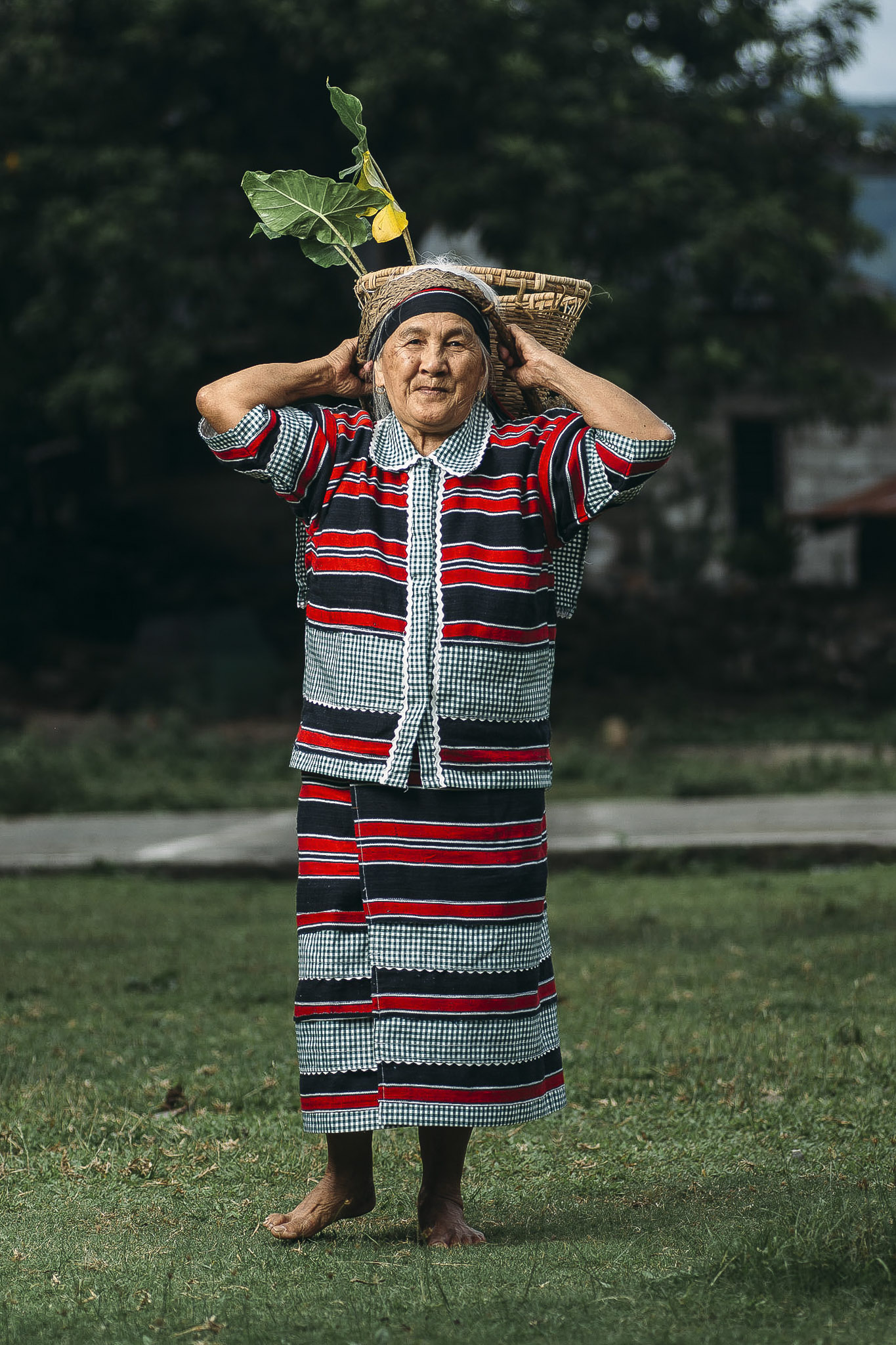
An elderly Ibaloi woman from Itogon, Benguet

The Ibaloi people (Ibaloi: ivadoy, /ivaˈdoj/) are an indigenous ethnic group found in Benguet Province of the northern Philippines. Their native language is Ibaloi, also known as Inibaloi or Nabaloi. The term Ibaloi is derived from i-, a prefix signifying "pertaining to," and badoy, meaning "house," together meaning "people who live in houses." The Ibaloi primarily inhabit the southeastern part of Benguet, with a population of 209,338 as of 2020. They also live in the western part of Nueva Vizcaya and the eastern part of La Union. The Ibaloi are distributed in the mountain valleys and settlements. Ancestral land claims by Ibaloi communities include parts of Baguio.

The Ibaloi have a rich material culture, most notably their mummification process, tattooing called "burik," and their rice terraces. Ibaloi society is composed of the rich (baknang) and three poor classes, the cowhands (pastol), farmhands (silbi), and non-Ibaloi slaves (bagaen). The native language of the Ibaloi people has three dialects: Bokod, Daklan, and Kabayan. In addition to their native language, the Ibaloi often speak Ilocano and Tagalog as second languages. The Ibaloi language is closely related to the Pangasinan language, which is primarily spoken in the province of Pangasinan, located southwest of Benguet.

=== Ifugao ===
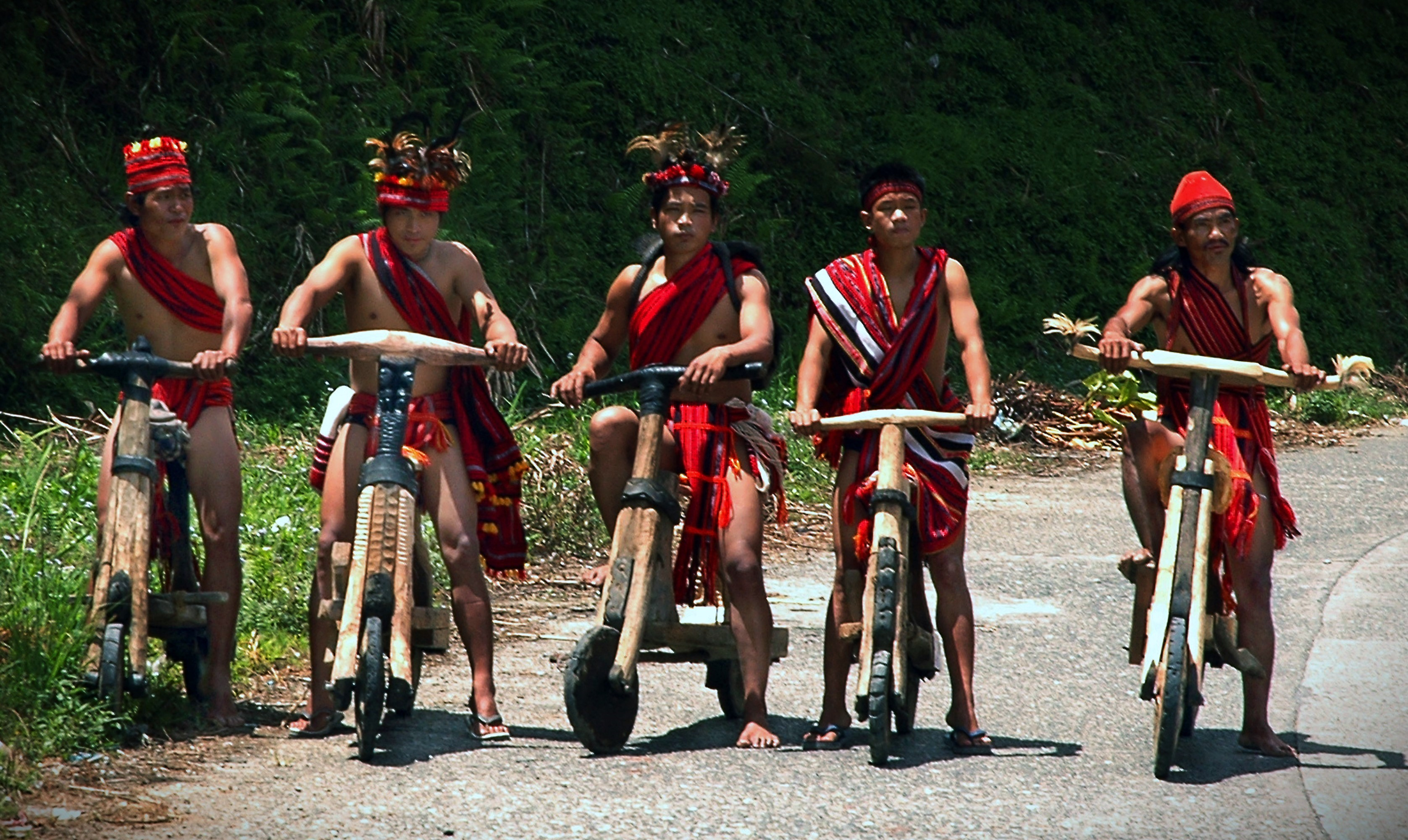
Ifugao men in traditional wanoh (loincloth) riding handcrafted wooden scooters.

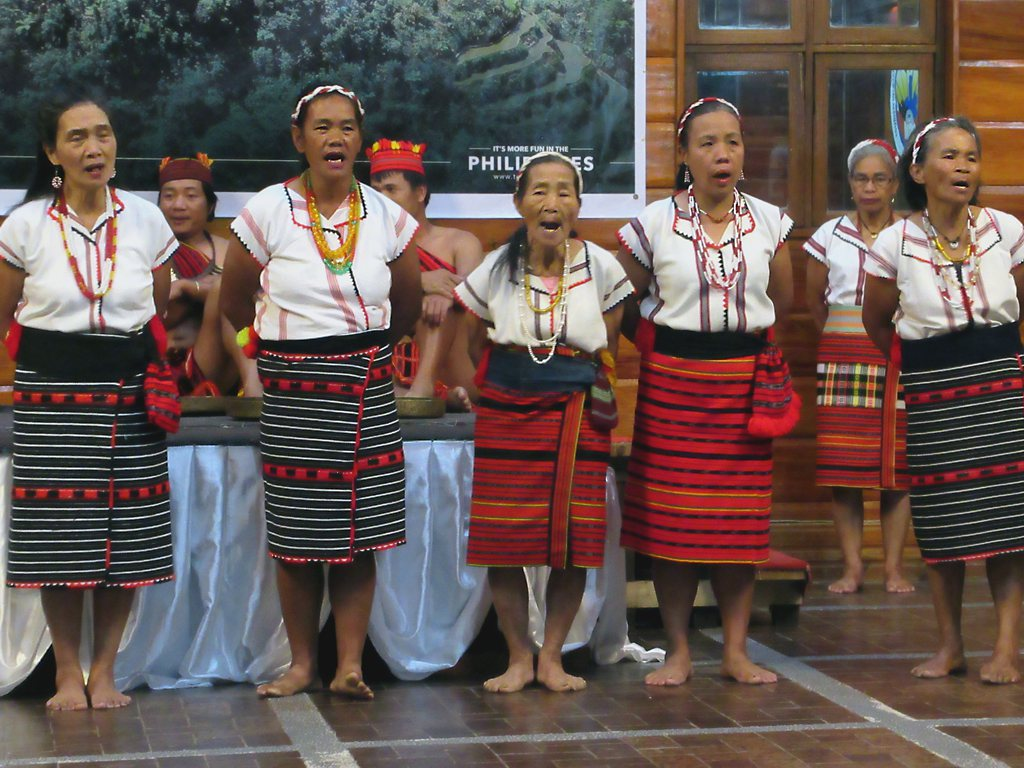
Ifugao women in traditional attire, wearing ampuyo (skirt), lamma (blouse), and ginuttu (belt).

The Ifugao (also known in the endonym of its respective tribe groups asAmganad, Ayangan, Kiangan, Gilipanes, Quiangan, Tuwali Ifugao, Mayoyao, Mayaoyaw) are the people inhabiting Ifugao Province with 82,718 population as of 2020. The term Ifugao is derived from ipugo, which means "earth people", "mortals" or "humans", as distinguished from spirits and deities. It also means "from the hill", as pugo means hill. The Ifugao are divided into subgroups based on the differences in dialects, traditions, and design/color of costumes. The main subgroups are Ayangan, Kalanguya, and Tuwali.

The country of the Ifugao in the southeastern part of the Cordillera region is best known for its famous Banaue Rice Terraces, which in modern times have become one of the major tourist attractions of the Philippines. The Ifugaos also speak four distinct dialects and are known for their rich oral literary traditions of hudhud and the alim, which were chosen as one of the 11 Masterpieces of the Oral and Intangible Heritage of Humanity. It was then formally inscribed as a UNESCO Intangible Cultural Heritage in 2008.

=== Isnag ===
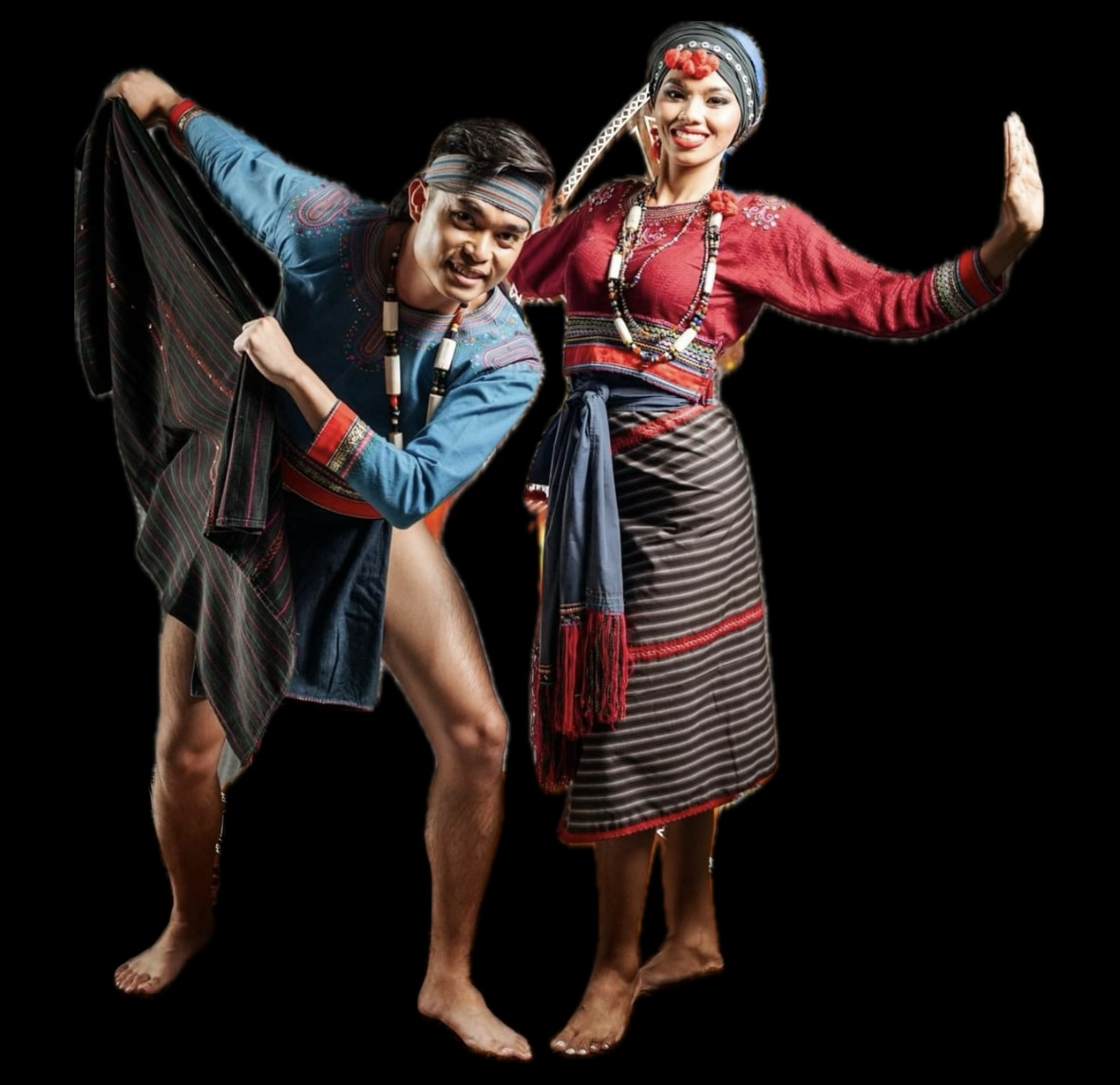
Isnag from Imanllod sub-tribe in their traditional attire

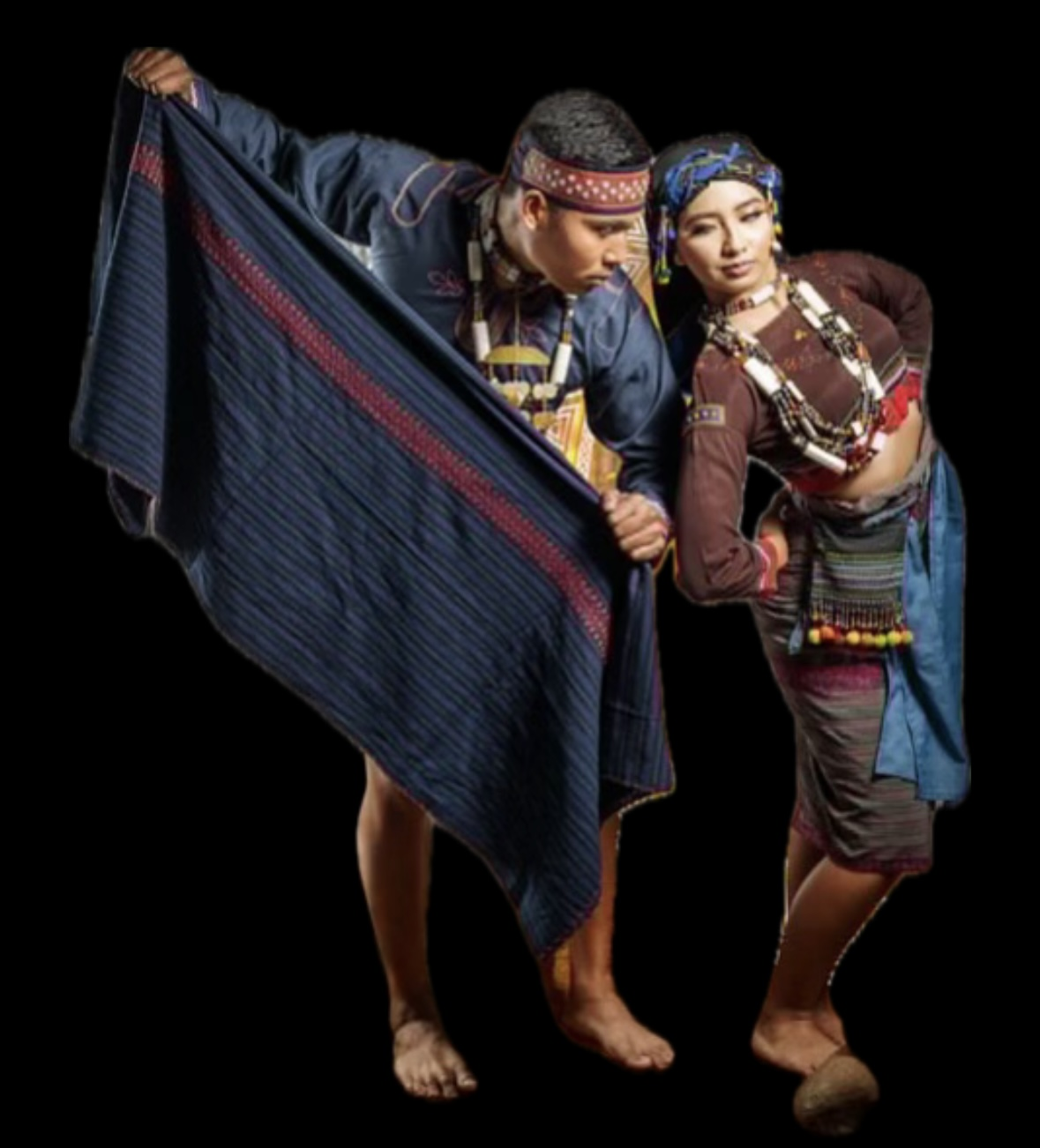
Isnag from Ymandaya sub-tribe in their traditional attire

The Isnag people (also Isneg or Apayao) are native to Apayao Province in the Cordillera Administrative Region, with a population of 54,307 as of 2020. Isnag is derived from a combination of 'is,' meaning 'recede,' and 'unag,' meaning 'interior.' Thus, it translates to 'people who live inland.' Their native language is Isneg (also called Isnag), although most Isnag people also speak Ilocano.

Two major subgroups among the Isnag are known: the Ymandaya, mostly concentrated in the municipality of Calanasan; and the Imallod, with populations distributed among the other towns of the province. Isnag populations can also be found in the eastern part of the adjacent provinces of Ilocos Norte and Cagayan.

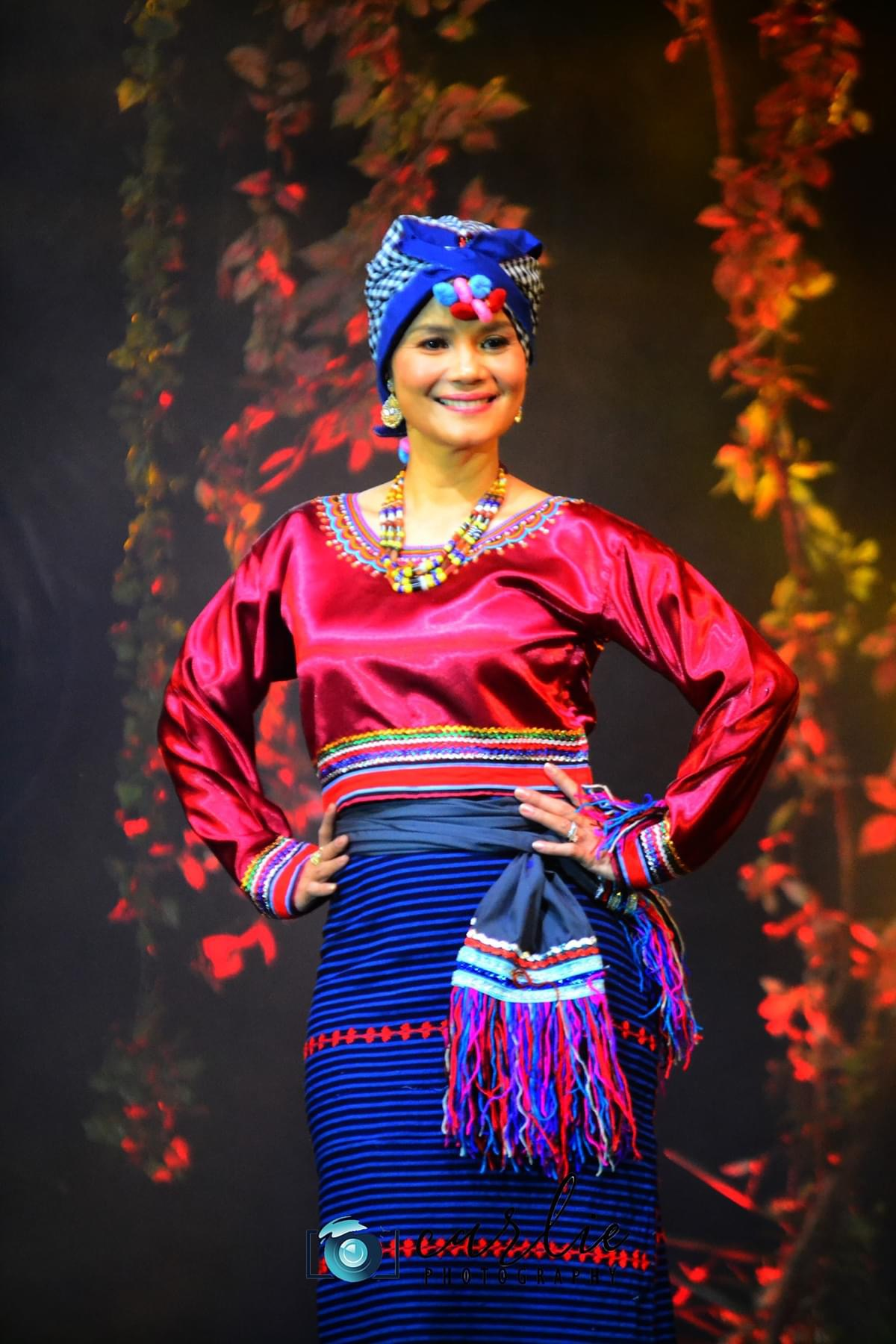
Isnag (Apayao) woman in traditional attire, wearing sinulpo (upper garment) and aken (wraparound cloth).

The Isnag sub-tribes are classified based on their dialect accents. Despite the variations in accents, they are still able to understand and communicate with each other, namely: Imandaya, Imallod, Itawit, Ingahan, Isnag (Isneg) of Katablangan, Conner, Iyapayao (Ehapayao/Yapayao), and Imalawa.

=== Itneg ===
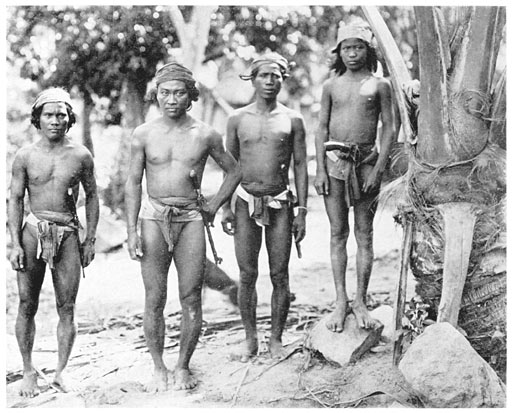
Itneg (Tinguian) men of Sallapadan, Abra, circa 1922

Otherwise known as Itineg, meaning "people living near the Tineg River" (exonyms: Tinguian, Tinguianes, Itinek, Mandaya, Tingian), they are an Austronesian ethnic group from the upland provinces of Abra and Ilocos Sur in northwestern Luzon, Philippines. The native Itneg language is a South-Central Cordilleran dialect. The group has been classified into several subgroups: Adassen, Binongan, Inlaod, Masadiit, Aplai, Banao, Gubang, Maeng, Luba, and Balatok, although the latter might be a Kalinga group.

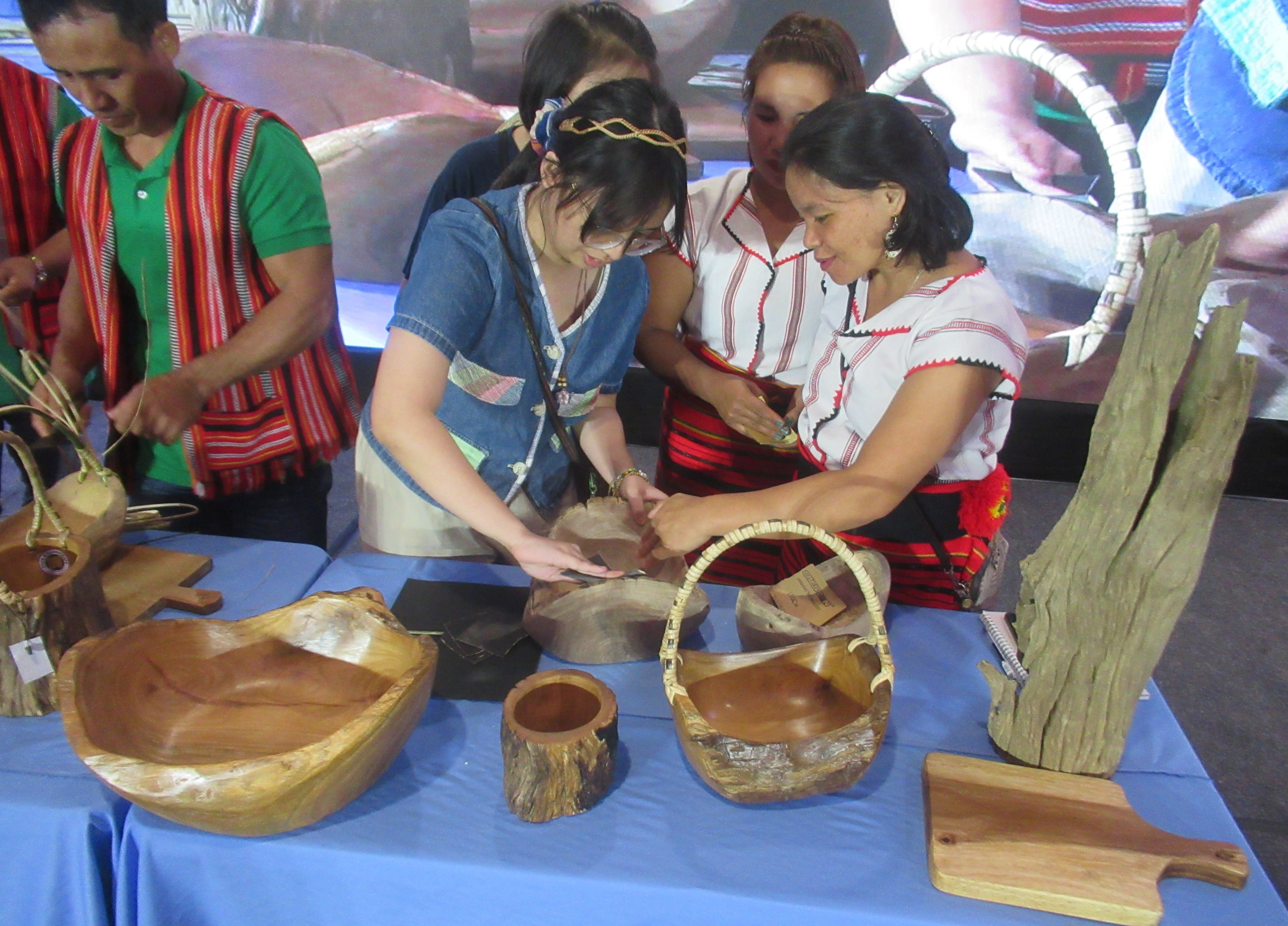
Itneg (Tinguian) artisans demonstrating traditional handicraft-making techniques

As of 2020, The total population of the Itnegs are 140,944. The Inlaod Itneg population was estimated at 14,000. The Binongan Tinguian/Itneg population was estimated at 11,000. The Adasen Tinguian/Itneg population was estimated at 6,600. In 2020, the Itneg/Tingguian population in the Cordillera Administrative Region (CAR) was estimated at 100,806. There are two general groupings: the valley Tinggian, which is a homogeneous and concentrated population found in the lower reaches of Abra, thriving on wet rice cultivation, and the mountain Tinggian, which depend on dry cultivation and root crops in the higher elevations.

Traditionally, the Tinggian live in fortified villages adjacent to their swidden fields. They differ from other Philippine ethnic groups in that their traditional dress is primarily white, with women known for their heavily beaded and full lower-arm ornaments.

=== Iwak ===
The Iwak people (Oak, Iguat, Iwaak, etc.) is a small ethnic group, which has a population of approximately 3,274, dispersed in small fenced-in villages which are usually enclaves in communities of surrounding major ethnic groups like the Ibaloy and Ikalahan. The characteristic village enclosing fences are sometimes composed in part of the houses with the front entry facing inward. Pig sties are part of the residential architecture. The Iwak are found principally in the municipalities of Boyasyas and Kayapa, province of Nueva Vizcaya. The subgroups are: (1) Lallang ni I'Wak, (2) Ibomanggi, (3) Italiti, (4) Alagot, (5) Itangdalan, (6) Ialsas, (7) Iliaban, (8)Yumanggi, (9) Ayahas, and (10) Idangatan. They speak the Iwaak language, which is a Nuclear Southern Cordilleran language which makes it closely related to Ibaloi, Kalanguya, and Karao.

=== Kalanguya ===
The Kalanguya (also called Ikalahan) live in the Cordillera Administrative Region, but can also be found in Nueva Vizcaya, Nueva Ecija, and Pangasinan. As of 2020 their population is 116,882. They speak the Kalanguya language or "Kallahan", which was once the most spoken language in most parts of today's Benguet, Nueva Vizcaya, Ifugao, Mt. Province, and some parts of Nueva Ecija but is no longer due to ethnocentrism. The Kalanguya population in Nueva Vizcaya has also been identified in anthropological literature as "Ikal-lahan". Those who reside in Tinoc and Buguias call themselves Kalangoya. Those who reside in Nueva Vizcaya and Quirino call themselves Ikalahans. In the past this ethnolinguistic group was known as Kalanggutan, Keley'I, Mandek'ey, Yatukka, or Kalangoya. Initially thought by some researchers as a subgroup of the Ifugao people, extensive studies have now shown that the Kalanguya are distinct from the Ifugao.

=== Kalinga ===
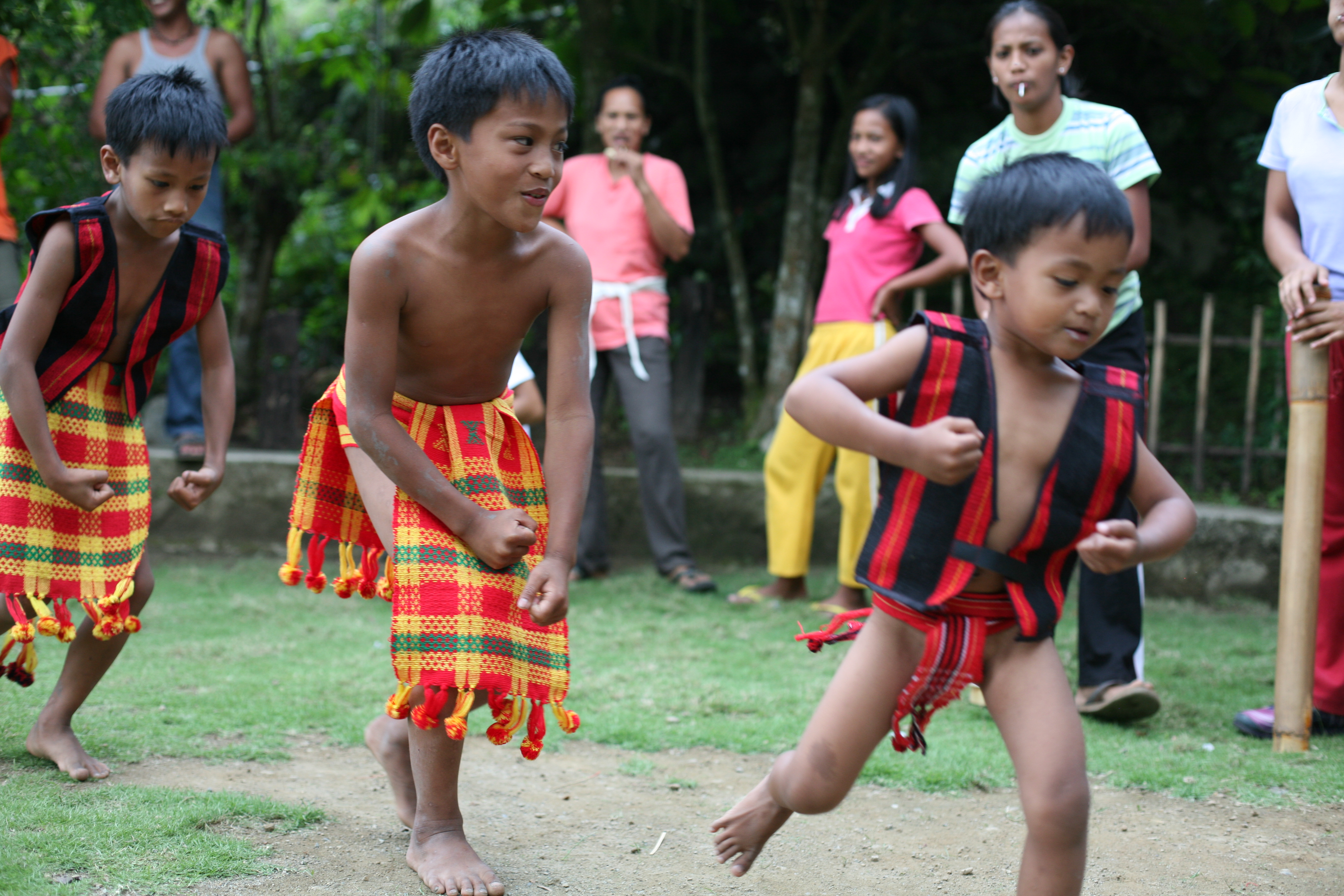
Young boys from Kalinga perform the muscle dance

The Kalinga people, also known as "iKalinga," inhabit the drainage basin of the middle Chico River in Kalinga Province, with a population of 212,983 as of 2020. Some have migrated to Mountain Province, Apayao, Cagayan, and Abra. The name Kalinga is an exonym derived from the Ibanag and Gaddang term kalinga, meaning "headhunter."

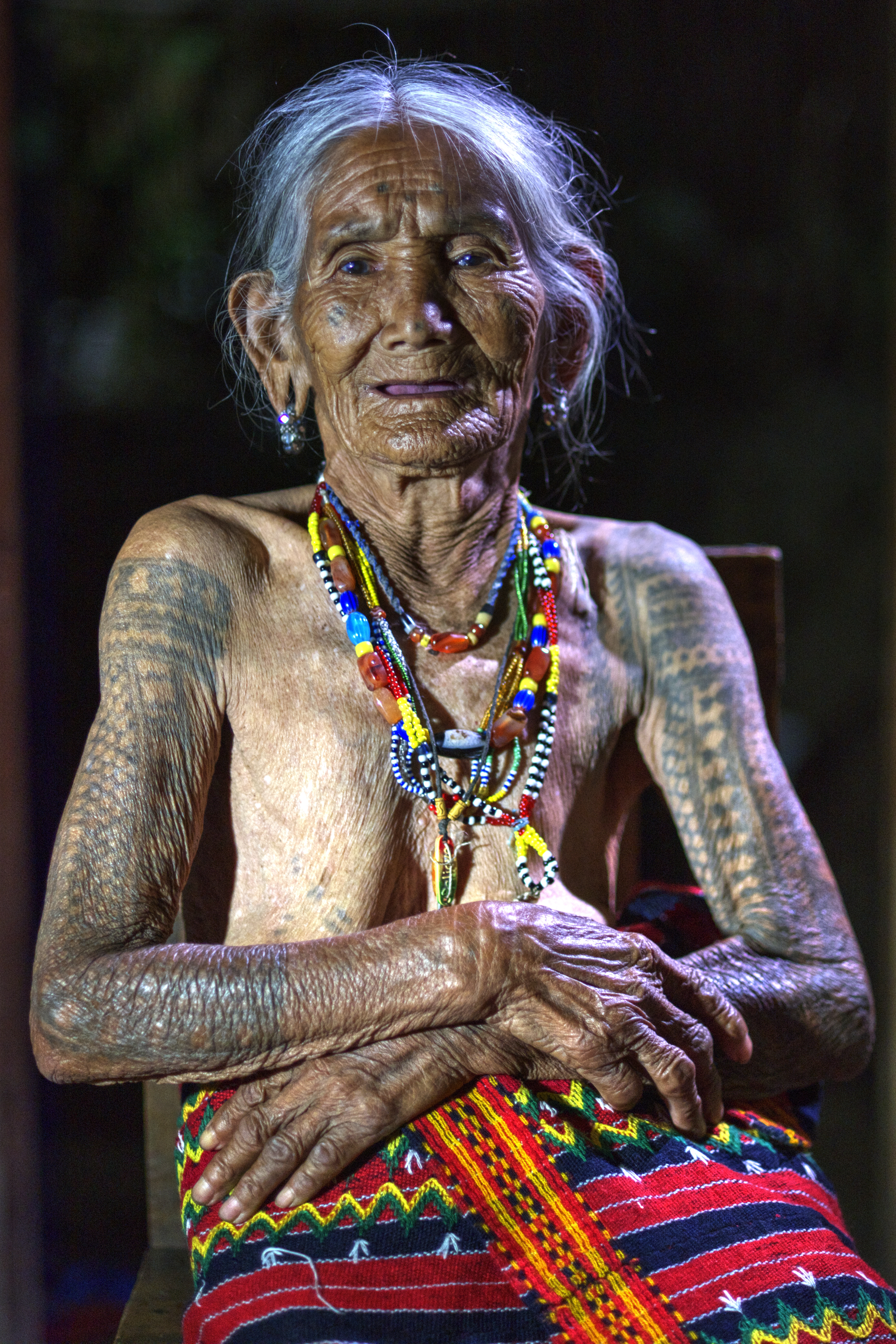
Kalinga woman from Buscalan, Tinglayan adorned with whatok (tattoo), symbolizing beauty and cultural identity.

The Kalinga are subdivided into Southern and Northern groups, with the latter considered the most heavily ornamented people of northern Philippines. They practice both wet and dry rice farming and have developed an institution of peace pacts called Bodong, which has minimized traditional warfare and headhunting. This system also serves as a mechanism for the initiation, maintenance, renewal, and reinforcement of kinship and social ties. The Kalinga people speak various Kalinga tribal languages, as well as Ilocano, Tagalog, and English. One of the most renowned figures of the Kalinga people is Apo Whang-Od, the last and oldest mambabatok (traditional tattoo artist) of the Butbut tribe.

=== Kankanaey ===
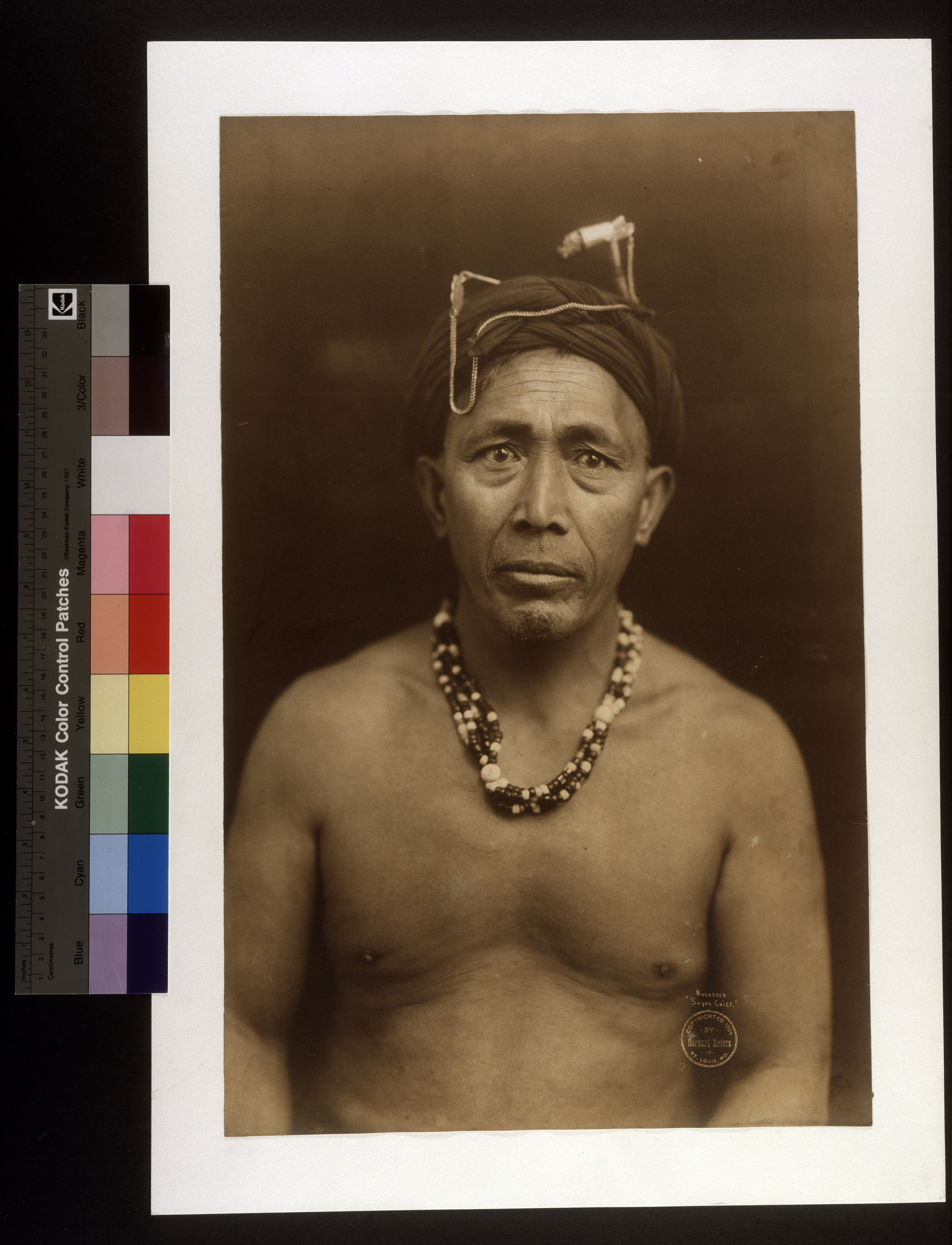
A Kankanaey chieftain of Bucassen, Suyoc, circa 1904.

The Kankanaey people (Kankanai or Kankana-ey) are native to Western Mountain Province, northern Benguet, northeastern La Union, and southeastern Ilocos Sur, with a population of 466,970 as of 2020. The Kankanaey have two distinct sub-groups: the Northern Kankanaey, or Applai, who live in Sagada and Besao in western Mountain Province and constitute a linguistic group, and the Southern Kankanaey, who live in the mountainous regions of Mountain Province and Benguet, specifically in the municipalities of Tadian, Bauko, Sabangan, Bakun, Kibungan, Buguias, and Mankayan.

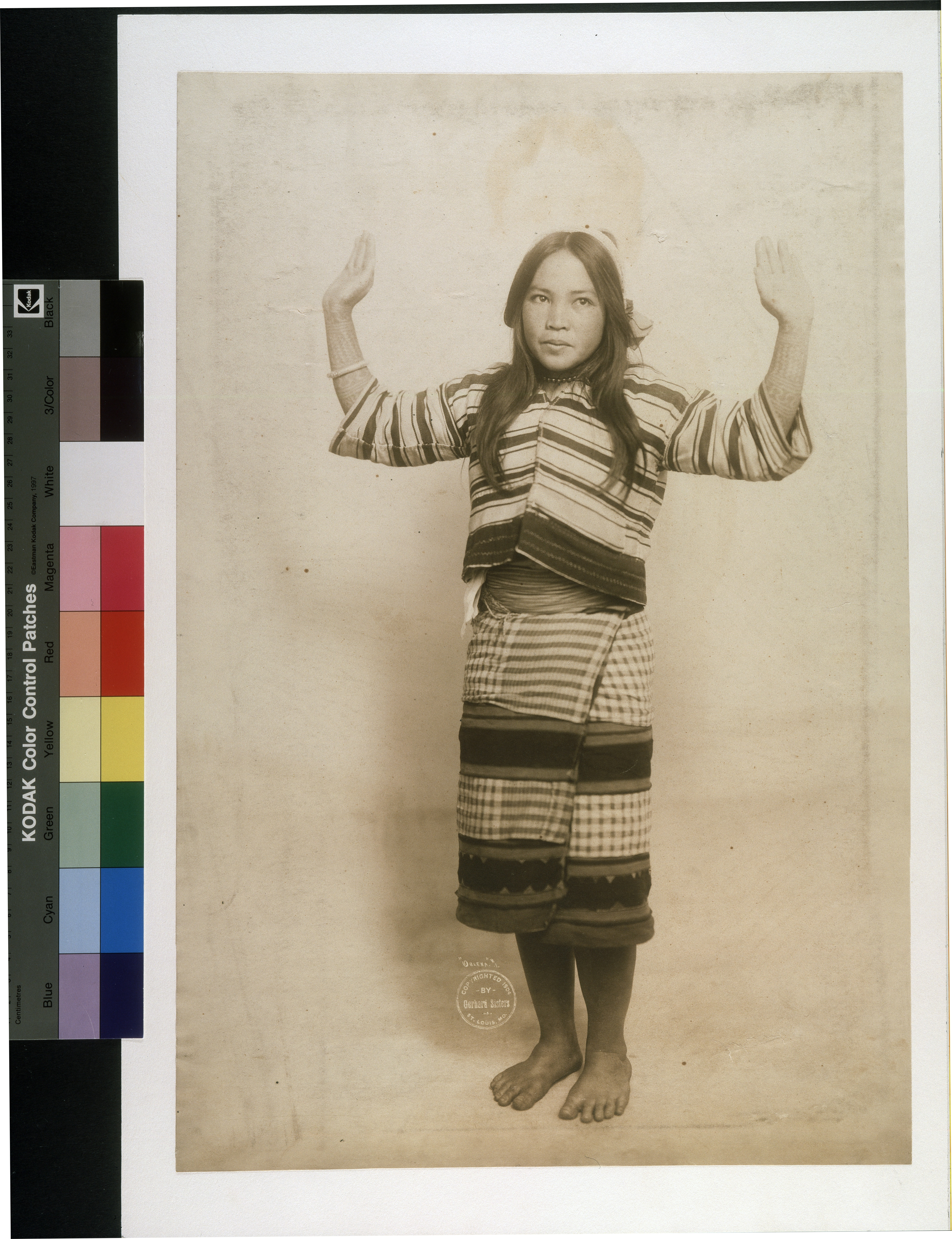
Kankanaey woman posing for the tayaw dance, circa 1904, in Suyoc.

Like most Igorot ethnic groups, the Kankanaey built sloping terraces to maximize farm space in the rugged terrain of the Cordilleras. They speak the Kankanaey language, with differences primarily in intonation and word usage. In terms of intonation, there is a distinction between those who speak Hard Kankanaey (Applai) and Soft Kankanaey. Speakers of Hard Kankanaey come from Sagada and Besao in western Mountain Province and surrounding areas. They speak with a harder intonation, differing in some words from those who speak Soft Kankanaey. Soft-speaking Kankanaey come from northern and other parts of Benguet, as well as from the municipalities of Sabangan, Tadian, and Bauko in Mountain Province. These sub-groups also differ in certain ways of life and sometimes in culture.

==== Bago ====
The Bago (Bago Igorot or Vago) were first identified in the municipality of Pugo, located on the southeastern side of La Union. Historically, they are the Christianized Igorots or Nuevo Cristianos, who were often referred to as Vagos or Bago during Spanish colonization in the Ilocos Region. As of 2020, the Bago population is 101,965, with Ilocos Sur having the highest population at 38,692. This is a highly acculturated group whose villages are located along major transportation routes between the lowlands and the Abatan, Benguet markets in the highlands. The major ritual practices and beliefs are somewhat related to the northern Kankanay, thus the idea that the people were migrants because of trade from western Mountain Province. The Kankanay regard them as such and not as a specific ethnic group. The language is a mixture of northern Kankanay with an infusion of lowland dialects. Most of the individuals are bilingual with Ilocano as the trade language. Their agricultural activities revolve around a mixture of highland root crops like sweet potatoes, yams, and taro, and lowland vegetables and fruits.

=== Karao ===
The Karao (Karaw) tribe lives in the municipality of Bokod, Benguet. The ancestors of the Karaos are the Panuy-puys (puypuys), who migrated from Palileng, Bontoc to Diyang in Nueva Viscaya, and finally settled in Karao in the latter part of the nineteenth century. They speak the Karao language (also spelled Karaw). It is spoken in the Karao, Ekip, and Bokod areas of western Benguet Province, and in the southwestern corner of Ifugao Province. The language is named after the barangay of Karaw in Bokod municipality, Benguet.

== Cagayan Valley and Caraballo group ==
The Cagayan Valley and Caraballo group are a group of ethnic groups native to the Cagayan Valley and Sierra Madre areas. Distinct culturally with the Igorots, they pride themselves with their distinct identity, traditions and culture.

=== Ilongot ===
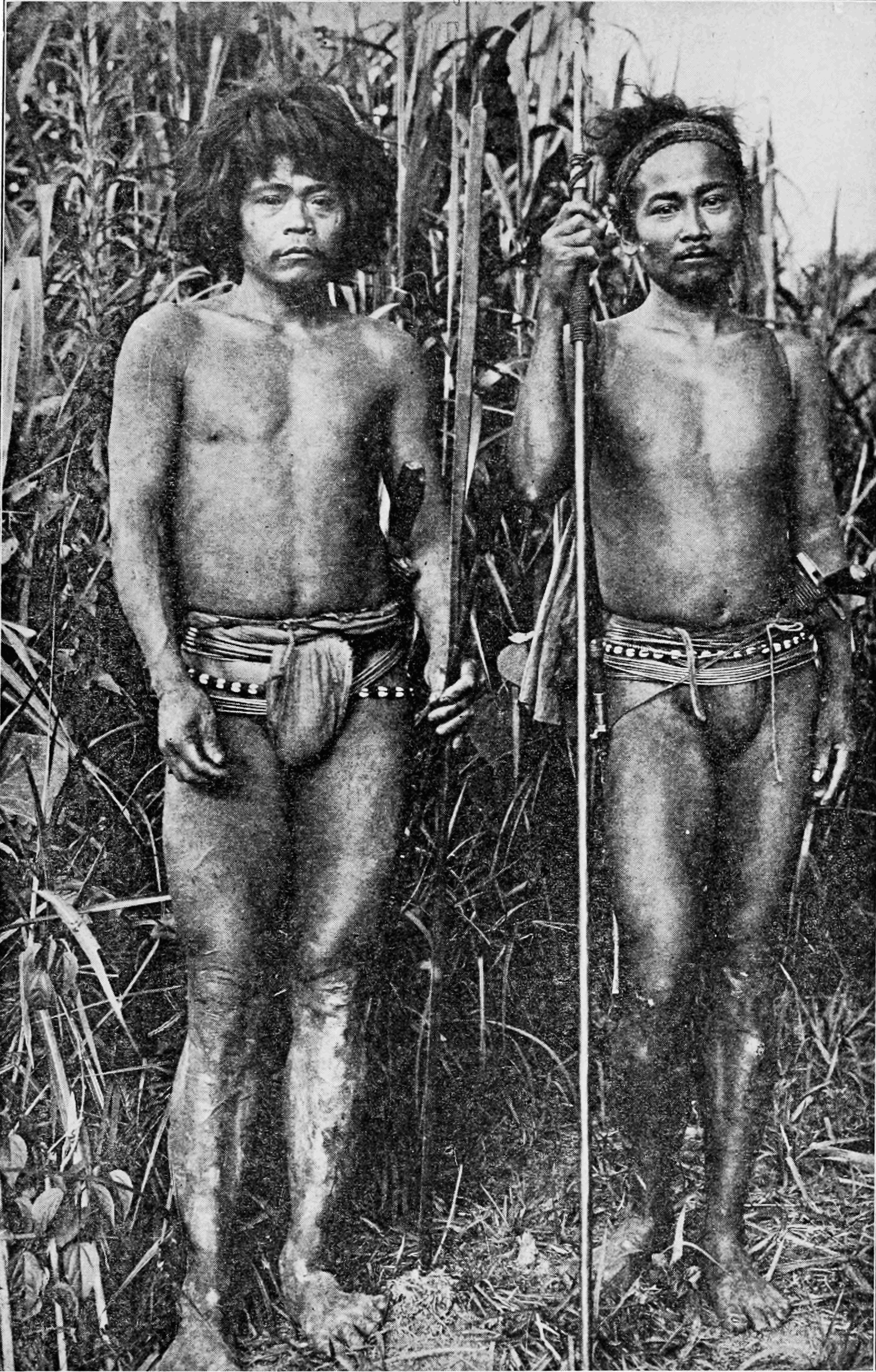
Ilongot men also known as Bugkalot circa 1910, wearing traditional attire and accessories.

The Ilongot (Bugkalot) are a tribe who inhabit the southern Sierra Madre and Caraballo Mountains, on the east side of Luzon in the Philippines, primarily in the provinces of Nueva Vizcaya and Nueva Ecija and along the mountain border between the provinces of Quirino and Aurora. An alternative name of this tribe and its language is "Bugkalot". They are known as a tribe of headhunters. Presently, there are about 18,000 Ilongots. The Ilongots tend to inhabit areas close to rivers, as they provide a food source and a means for transportation. Their native language is the Ilongot language, the number of speakers is reported to be at 5,710 according to the 2010 census, classifying the language as threatened (EGIDS 6b). They also speak the Ilocano & Tagalog languages, the latter is spoken in Nueva Ecija & Aurora as much as Ilocano.

=== Isinai ===
The Isinai/Isinay are a small ethnic group living in the Cagayan Valley, specifically in the municipalities of Bambang, Dupax del Sur, Aritao in Nueva Vizcaya, as well as around Quirino province, and in the northern areas of Nueva Ecija and Aurora. Their ethnic communities show a decline in population, with only around 12,600 members on record. They speak the Isinai language (also spelled Isinay), which is a Northern Luzon language primarily spoken in Nueva Vizcaya province in the northern Philippines. By linguistic classification, it is more divergent from other South-Central Cordilleran languages, such as Kalinga, Itneg or Ifugao and Kankanaey.

=== Ibanag ===
The Ibanags are a predominantly Christian lowland ethnic group numbering around half a million people and who primarily inhabit the provinces of Cagayan and Isabela in the Cagayan Valley of northern Luzon. They speak the Ibanag language, which is distantly related to Ilocano, which they speak as second language.

=== Itawes/Itawis/Itawit ===
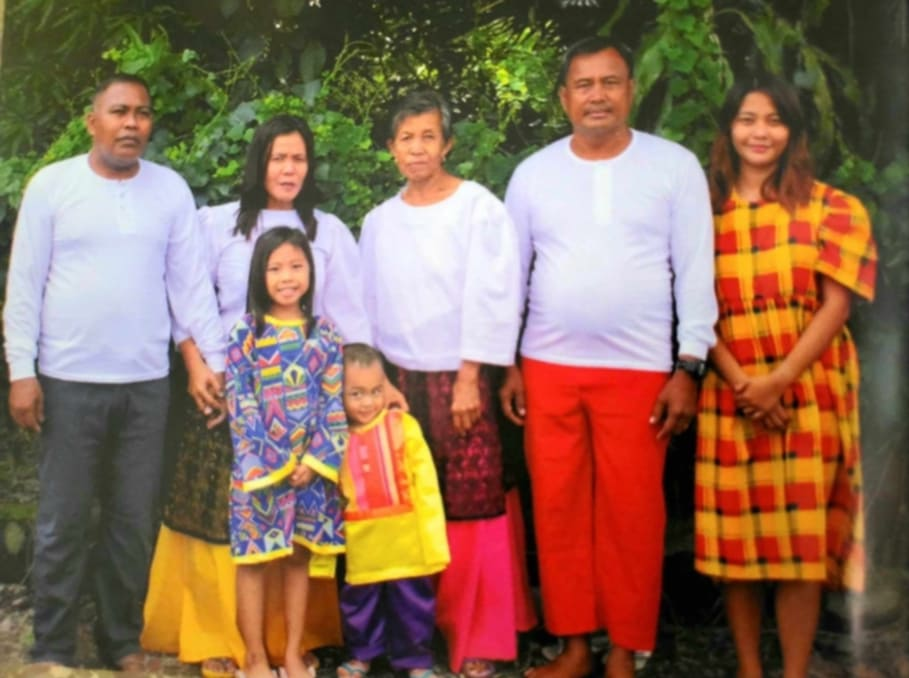
A typical Itawes family in their native attire

The Itawes/Itawis/Itawit are among the earliest inhabitants of the Cagayan Valley in northern Luzon. Their name is derived from the Itawes prefix i- meaning "people of" and tawid or "across the river". As well as their own Itawis language, they speak Ibanag and Ilocano. The contemporary Itawes are charming, friendly, and sociable. They are not very different from other lowland Christianized Filipino ethnic groups in terms of livelihood, housing, and traditions. Their traditional dresses are colorful with red being the dominant color. Farming is a leading source of livelihood. The average families are education-conscious.

=== Malaweg ===
The Malaweg are located in sections of Cagayan Valley and Kalinga-Apayao provinces and in the town of Rizal. Their main crops are lowland rice and corn. Tobacco was raised as a cash crop on a foothill west of Piat on the Matalag river near the southeast border of Kalinga-Apayao province, drawing Ibanags from the east. Culturally, they are similar to the neighbor groups: Ibanag and Itawis. Linguistically, they speak a dialect of Itawis.

=== Gaddang ===
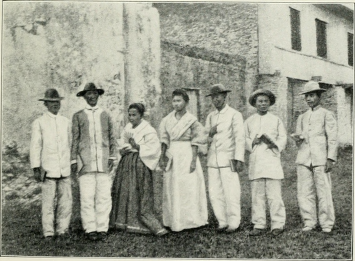
Northern Luzon natives, c. 1906

The Gaddang number about 25,000. They are known to have inhabited the upper Cagayan Valley and the Magat valley below Aritao in Nueva Vizcaya and in Isabela since before the Spanish arrived. Main centers of their language are found in Ilagan, Santiago, Cauayan, Solano, Bagabag, and Bayombong, as well as surrounding towns. Speakers from each municipality have significantly characteristic vocabulary, usage, and pronunciation, although they understand each other well. Their language is related to Ibanag and Itawis; it is also spoken by ethnically related highland Ga'dang in the provinces of Ifugao Province, Kalinga Province, and Mountain Province.

=== Yogad ===
The Yogad are 15.00% christian and are one of the smallest minority groups in the region of the Cagayan Valley. They once occupied Diffun, Quirino in Cagayan Valley. Today, they are concentrated in Echague, Camarag, Angadanan, Santiago, and Jones, Isabela. Yogads speak the Yogad language, which is one of the five recognized dialects of Gaddang, and are identified as part of the Christianized Kalingas in western Isabela.

== Mangyan ethnolinguistic groups ==
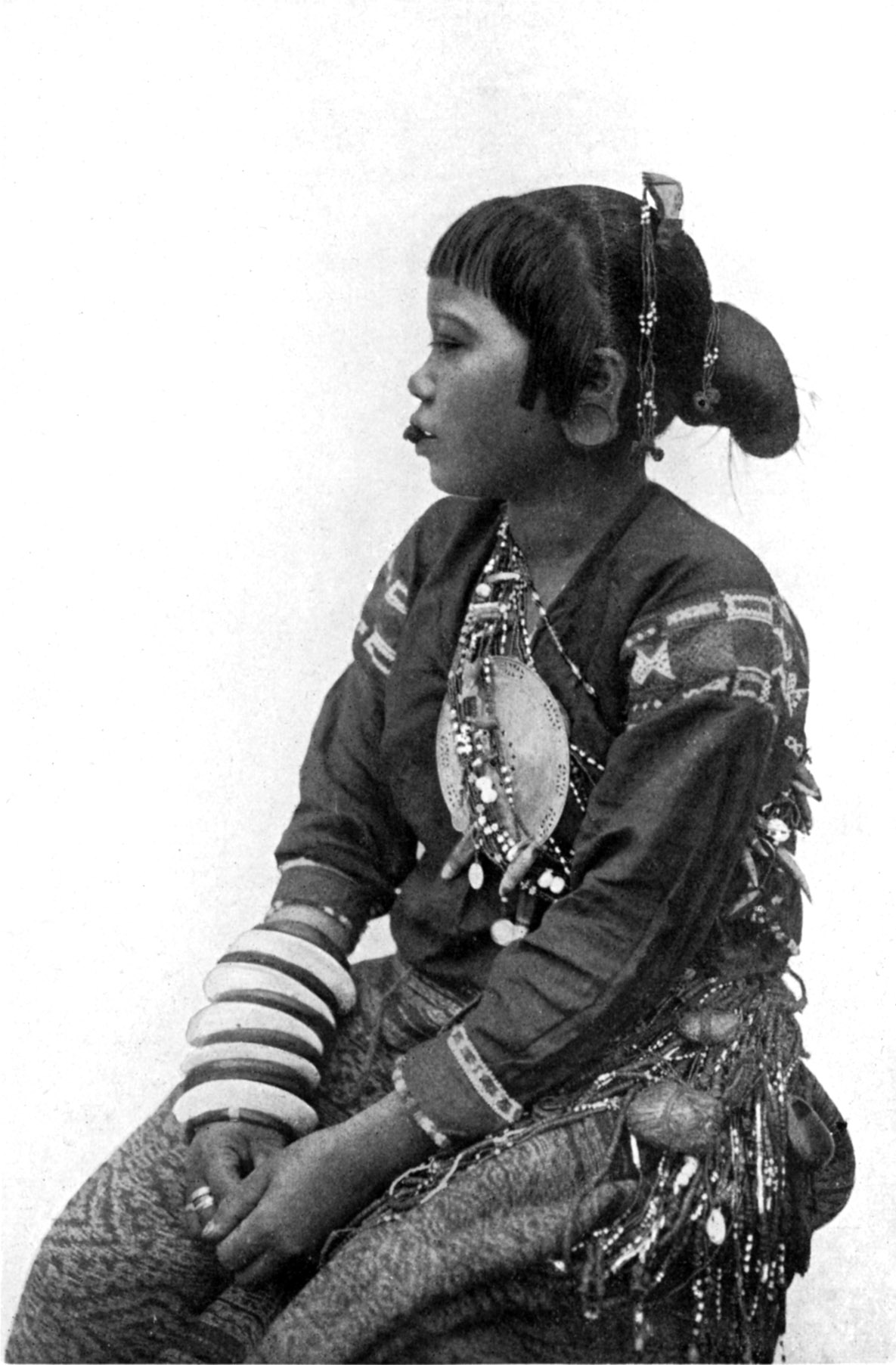
Mangyan woman circa 1912

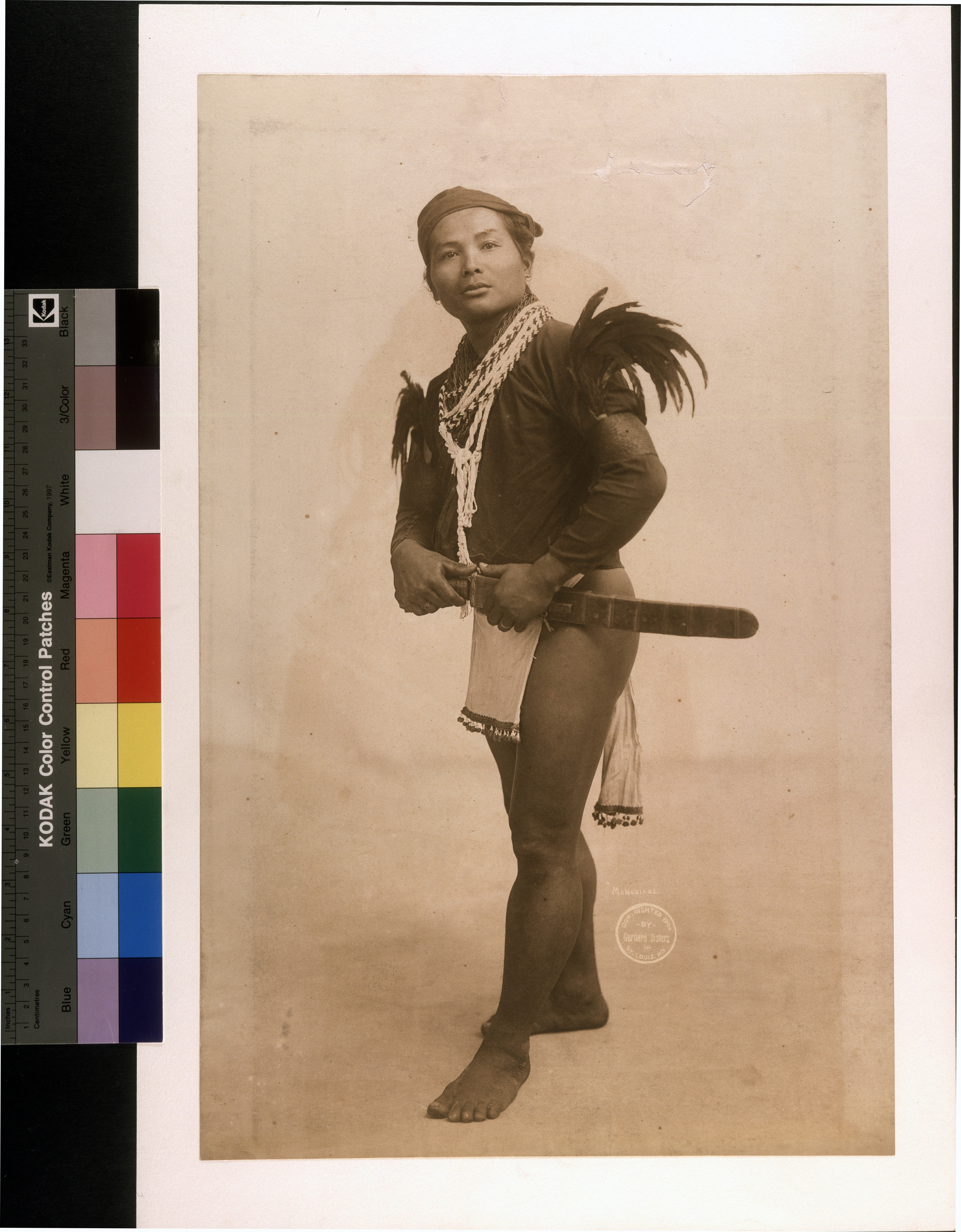
Dalman, Mangyan man circa 1904

Mangyan is the generic name for the eight indigenous groups found on the island of Mindoro, southwest of the island of Luzon in the Philippines, each with its own tribal name, language, and customs. They occupy nearly the whole of the interior of the island of Mindoro. The total population may be around 280,000, but official statistics are difficult to determine under the conditions of remote areas, reclusive tribal groups and some having little if any outside world contact. They also speak Tagalog as their second language because of arrival of Tagalog settlers from Batangas.

=== Iraya ===
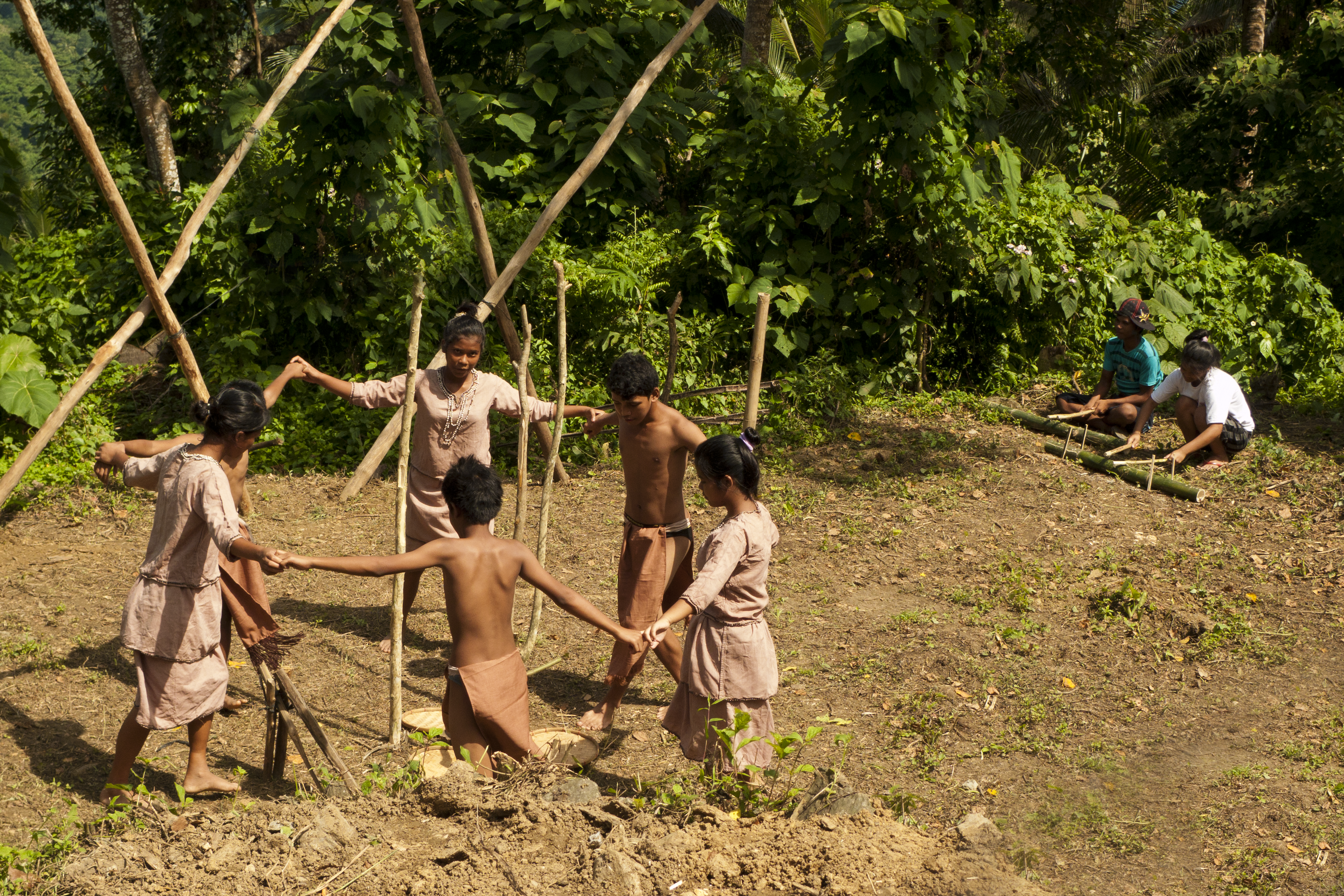
Mangyan dancing

The Iraya are Mangyans that live in municipalities in northern Mindoro, such as Paluan, Abra de Ilog, northern Mamburao, and Santa Cruz municipalities in Occidental Mindoro, and Puerto Galera and San Teodoro municipalities in Oriental Mindoro. They have also been found in Calamintao, on the northeastern boundary of Santa Cruz municipality (7 km up the Pagbahan River from the provincial highway). They speak the Iraya language which is part of the North Mangyan group of Malayo-Polynesian languages, though it shows considerable differences to Tadyawan and Alangan, the other languages in this group. There are 6,000 to 8,000 Iraya speakers, and that number is growing. The language status of Iraya is developing, meaning that this language is being put to use in a strong and healthy manner by its speakers, and it also has its own writing system (though not yet completely common nor maintainable).

=== Alangan ===
The Alangan are mangyans that primarily live in the municipalities of Naujan and Victoria in Oriental Mindoro, and Sablayan in Occidental Mindoro. They speak the Alangan language and number about 2,150 people around north-central Mindoro. The Ayan Bekeg dialect spoken on the northeast slopes of Mount Halcon is understood by Alangan speakers throughout the area. They may also be found around Casague, Santa Cruz, Occidental Mindoro and Kulasisi (tributary of the Mompong River), near Barrio Arellano, Sablayan, Occidental Mindoro.

=== Tadyawan ===
Tadyawan are mangyans that primarily live in southern Lake Naujan in Oriental Mindoro. They can be found in Barrio Talapaan, Socorro, Oriental Mindoro; Happy Valley, Socorro, Oriental Mindoro; and Pahilaan, Calatagan, Pola, Oriental Mindoro. They speak the Tadyawan language, which has 4 dialects, namely Nauhan, East Aglubang, West Aglubang, and Pola. Nauhan and East Aglubang are close to each other. The West Aglubang is spoken farthest out and has strong Alangan influence.

=== Tawbuid ===
Tawbuid men, c. 1999

The Tau-build (or Tawbuid) Mangyans live in central Mindoro. They speak the Tawbuid language, which is divided into eastern and western dialects. The Bangon Mangyans also speak the western dialect of Tawbuid. In Oriental Mindoro, Eastern Tawbuid (also known as Bangon) is spoken by 1,130 people in the municipalities of Socorro, Pinamalayan, and Gloria.

=== Bangon ===
The Mangyan group known on the east of Mindoro as Bangon may be a subgroup of Tawbuid, as they speak the 'western' dialect of that language. They also have a kind of poetry which is called the Ambahan.

=== Buhid ===
The Buhid are mangyans that primarily live in Malfalon, Calintaan, Occidental Mindoro; Bato Eli, Barrio Monte Claro, San José Pandurucan (on the southern bank of the Bugsanga (Bisanga) River) in Occidental Mindoro; Barrio Rambida, Socorro, Oriental Mindoro; and Barrio Batangan, Panaytayan, Mansalay, Oriental Mindoro. They speak the Buhid language in the island of Mindoro, Philippines. It is divided into eastern and western dialects and uses its own unique Buhid script, which is encoded in the Unicode-Block Buhid (Buid) (1740–175F).

=== Hanunoo ===
Hanunuo, or Hanunó'o, are mangyans that live in Barrio Tugtugin, San Jose, Occidental Mindoro; Naluak, Magsaysay, Occidental Mindoro (on the upper Caguray River); Bamban, Magsaysay, Occidental Mindoro (also with Ratagnon and Bisayan residents); and Barrio Panaytayan, Mansalay, Oriental Mindoro (about 5 km from the highway in the mountains southwest of Mansalay). They speak the Hanunó'o language and use their own unique Hanunuo script, which is encoded in the Unicode-Block Hanunoo (1720–173F).

=== Ratagnon ===
Ratagnon (also transliterated Datagnon or Latagnon) are mangyans of the southernmost tip of Occidental Mindoro in the Mindoro Islands along the Sulu Sea. They live in the southernmost part of the municipality of Magsaysay in Occidental Mindoro. The Ratagnon language is similar to the Visayan Cuyunon language, spoken by the inhabitants of Cuyo Island in Northern Palawan. The Ratagnon women wear a wrap-around cotton cloth from the waistline to the knees and some of the males still wear the traditional g-string. The women's breast covering is made of woven nito (vine). They also wear accessories made of beads and copper wire. The males wear a jacket with simple embroidery during gala festivities and carry flint, tinder, and other paraphernalia for making fire. Both sexes wear coils of red-dyed rattan at the waistline. Like other Mangyan tribes, they also carry betel chew and its ingredients in bamboo containers. As of 2010, only around 310 people speak the Ratagnon language, which is nearly extinct, out of an ethnic population of 2,000 people, since speakers are shifting to Tagalog. They appear to also have intermarried with lowlanders.

== Palawan ethnolinguistic groups ==
The indigenous peoples of Palawan are a diverse group of both indigenous tribes and lowland groups that historically migrated to the island of Palawan and its outlying islands. These ethnolinguistic groups are widely distributed to the long strip of mainland island literally traversing Luzon, Visayas and Mindanao. Listed below are specifically the tribal groups of Palawan, as opposed to its urban lowland groups that historically settled its cities and towns. Palawan is home to many indigenous peoples whose origins date back thousands of centuries. Pre-historic discoveries reveal how abundant cultural life in Palawan survived before foreign occupiers and colonizers reached the Philippine archipelago. Today, Palawan is making its best to preserve and conserve the richness of its cultural groups. The provincial government strives to support the groups of indigenous peoples of Palawan.

=== Tagbanwa ===
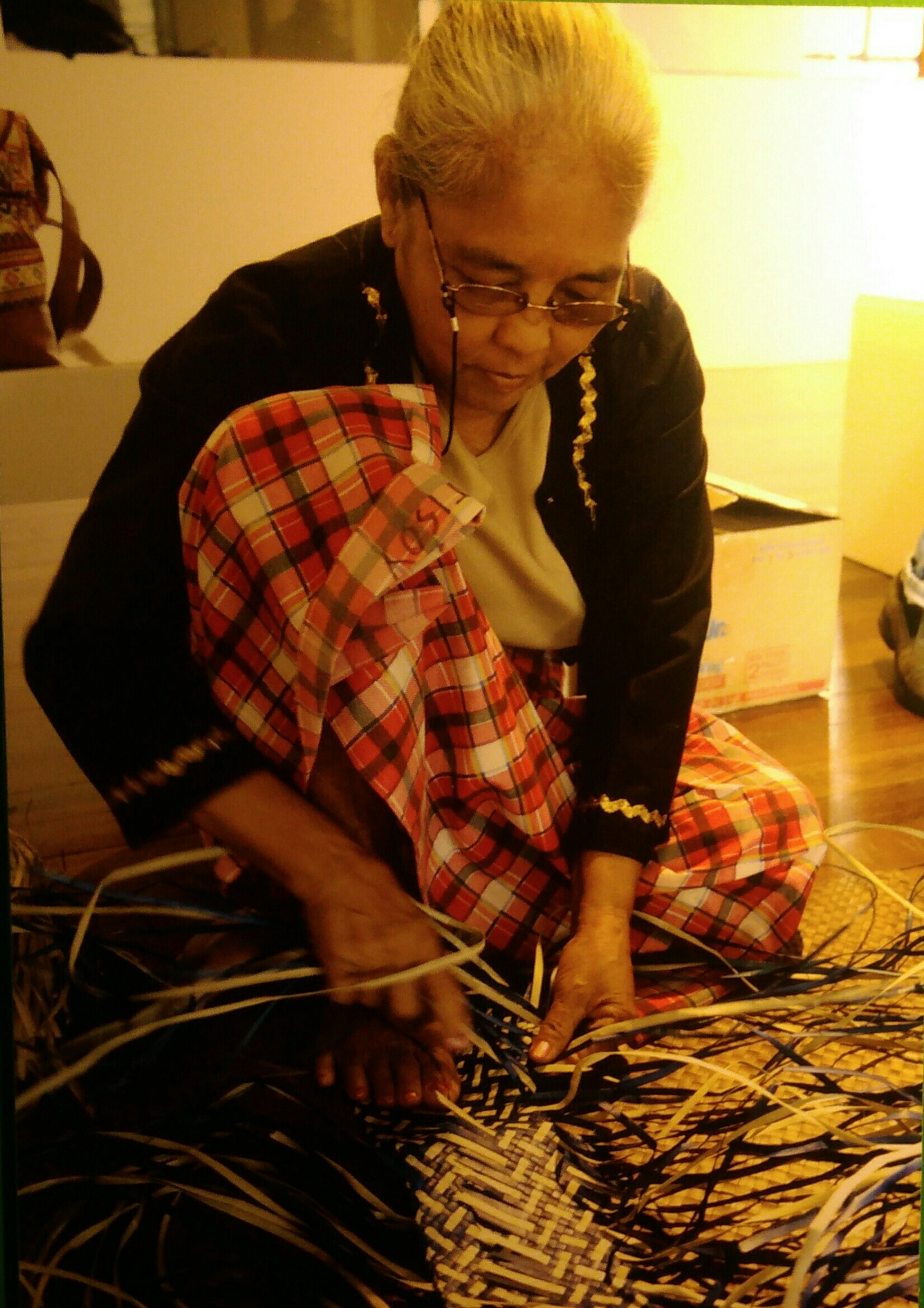
A Tagbanua weaver

The Tagbanwa/Tagbanua people (Tagbanwa: ᝦᝪᝯ), or "people of the world," are one of the oldest ethnic groups in the Philippines, and can be mainly found in the central and northern Palawan. Research has shown that the Tagbanwa are possible descendants of the Tabon Man, thus making them one of the original inhabitants of the Philippines. They are a brown-skinned, slim, and straight-haired ethnic group. They speak the Tagbanwa languages, which have their own unique Tagbanwa script with Unicode-Block Tagbanwa (1760–177F), and can be classified into two major classifications based on the geographical location where they can be found. Central Tagbanwas are found in the western and eastern coastal areas of central Palawan. They are concentrated in the municipalities of Aborlan, Quezon, and Puerto Princesa. Calamian Tagbanwa, on the other hand, are found in Baras coast, Busuanga Island, Coron Island, Linipacan Calibangbangan, and in some parts of El Nido. These two Tagbanwa sub-groups speak different languages and do not exactly have the same customs. Tagbanwa live in compact villages of 45 to 500 individuals. In 1987, there were 129,691 Tagbanwas living in Palawan. At present, Tagbanwa tribe has an estimated population of over 10,000. 1,800 of these are in the Calamianes. Shifting cultivation of upland rice is part of their cultural and economic practices. Rice is considered a divine gift and is fermented to make rice wine, which they use in Pagdiwata, or rice wine ritual. The cult of the dead is the key to the religious system of the Tagbanwa. They believe in several deities found in the natural environment. Their language and alphabet, practice of kaingin and common belief in soul-relatives are part of their culture. This group are excellent in basketry and wood carving. They are also famous for their beautifully crafted body accessories. Their combs, bracelets, necklaces and anklets are usually made of wood, beads, brass and copper. The Central Tagbanwa language is dying out as the younger generations are learning Cuyonon and Tagalog.

=== Palawano ===
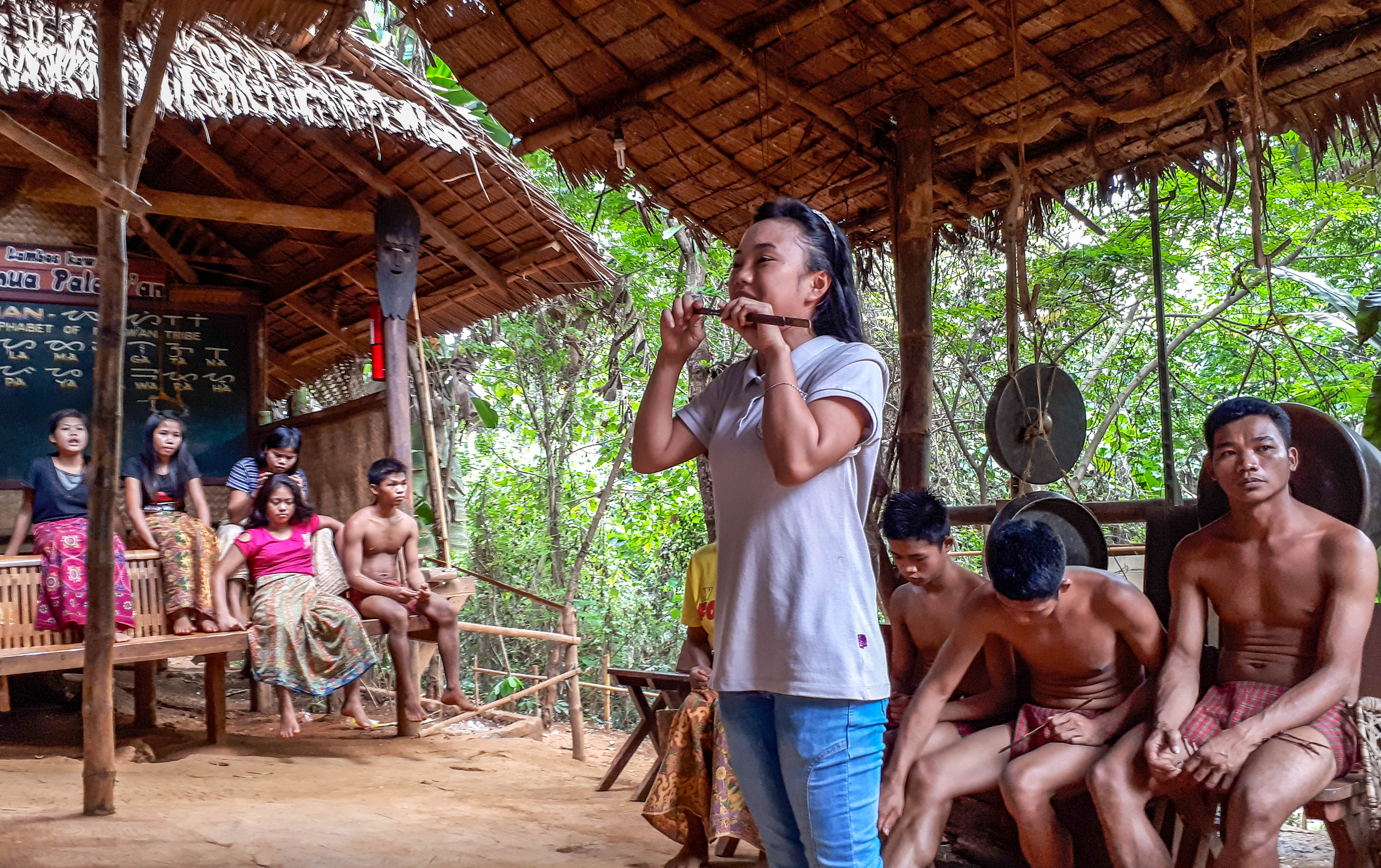
Palawan tribal village

The Palawan tribal people, also known as the Palawano (only by outsiders) or Palaw'an (or Palawan, depending on sub-dialect), are an indigenous ethnic group of the Palawan group of islands in the Philippines. They traditionally hunt using soars and bamboo blowguns. They speak the Palawano language, which is divided into four ethno-linguistic subgroupings: the Quezon Palawano which is also known as the Central Palawano; the Bugsuk Palawano or South Palawano; Brooke's Point Palawano; and Southwest Palawano. Palawanos are more popularly known as Palawans, which is pronounced faster than the name of the province. The Quezon Palawano subgroup are found in Southern Palawan, particularly on the western section of the municipality of Quezon including the eastern part of Abo-abo of the municipality of Sofronio Espanola, going southward down to the northern section of the municipality of Rizal. A large group of Palawans can also be found in Sitios Gugnan, Kambing, Tugpa, and Kalatabog of Barangay Panitian. The Taw't Bato of the municipality of Rizal at the foot of Mt. Matalingahan also belongs to this same Palawan tribal group although their language is 15 percent different from the Quezon Palawanos. The Palawano closely resemble the Tagbanwa, and in the past, they were doubtless the same people. Some Tausug residents in Palawan call the Palawano Traan, which means "people in scattered places". Like the Yakan of Basilan, the Palawano live in houses out of sight of each other, scattered among their plots of farm lands. Their main occupation is subsistence farming, cultivating mainly upland rice. Their religion is an old pre-Hispanic belief that mixes traditional animism with elements of Hinduism and Islamic belief. Some have embraced Islam from their southern Molbog and Palawani neighbors. A small number of them are Protestant due to recent missionary campaigns.

=== Taaw't Bato ===
The Taaw't Bato's name means "people of the rock". They speak the Taaw't Bato language, which is 80% intelligible with Palawano. They are not actually a separate language or ethnolinguistic nation, but rather a small community of traditional S.W. Palawanos who happen to reside in the crater of an extinct volcano during certain seasons of the year, in houses built on raised floors inside caves though others have set their homes on the open slopes. They are found in the Singnapan Basin, a valley bounded by Mount Mantalingajan on the east and the coast on the west. North of them is the municipality of Quezon, Palawan and to the South are the still unexplored regions of Palawan. They are still primitive in their lifestyle, even in the way of dressing. The men still wear g-strings made of bark and cloth and the women wear a piece of cloth made into skirts to cover the lower body. Both of them are half naked but sometimes women wear a blouse that is not indigenous but obtained through commercial markets. They mainly produce and consume cassava, but also produce sweet potato, sugarcane, malunggay, garlic, pepper, string beans, squash, tomato, pineapple, etc. Throughout the year, hunting and foraging is pursued to complement the carbohydrate diet of the people. Most of the wild pigs are caught through spring traps. They also indulge the sambi (barter) and dagang (monetary exchange). The trade is specifically for marine fish which the people of Candawaga provide in exchange for horticultural products of the Taaw't-Bato. Dagang involves forest products like the almaciga, rattan, etc. This tribe subsists on hunting, gathering fruits and planting crops and rice near the forest. Because of their uniqueness, the Philippine government declared their area off limits to strangers to protect them from unreasonable exploitation.

== Negrito ethnolinguistic groups ==
The Negrito are several Australo-Melanesian groups who inhabit isolated parts of Southeast Asia. They all live in remote areas throughout the islands in the Philippines.

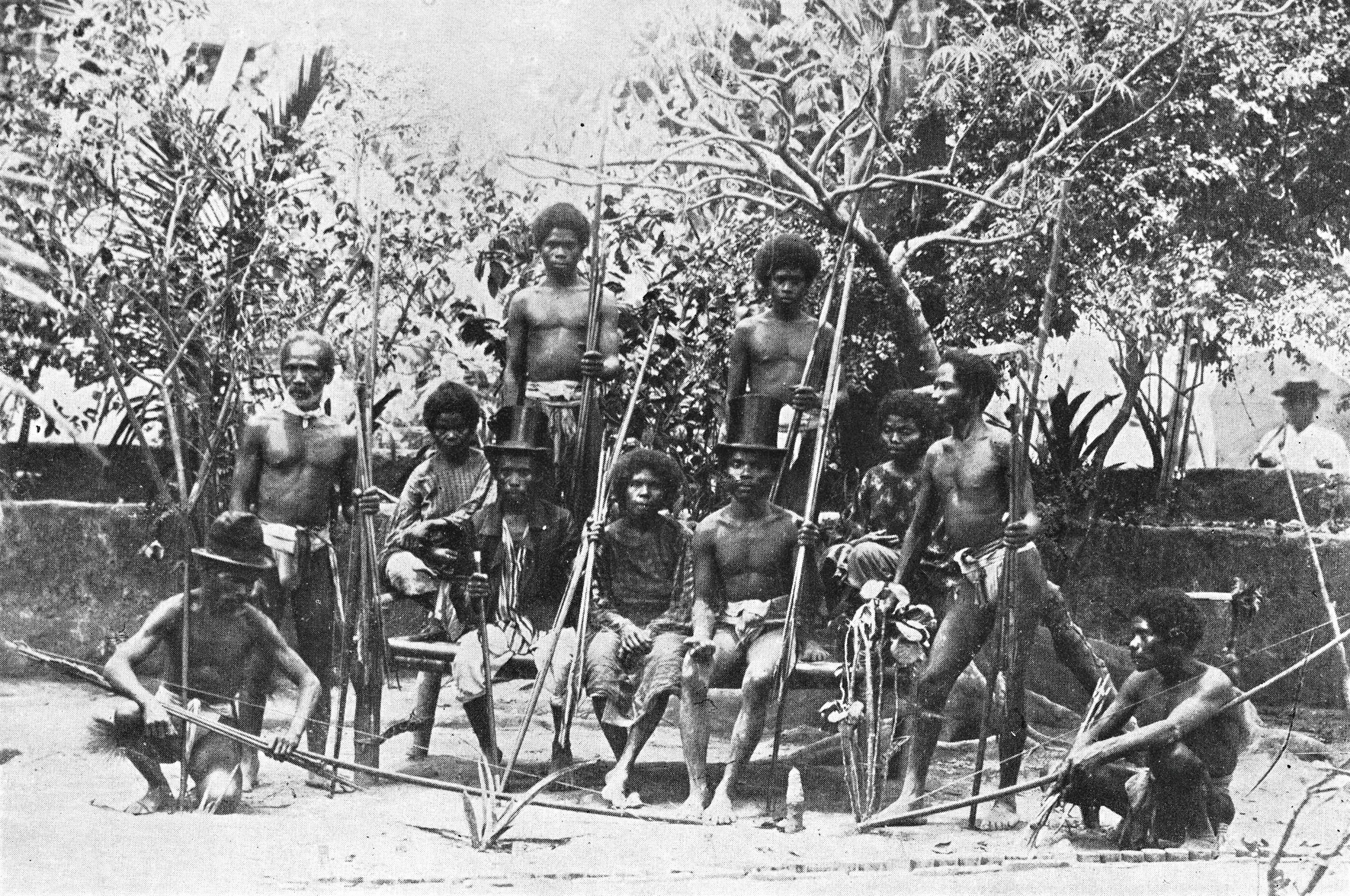
Group of Negritos, c. 1899

=== Aeta/Agta ===
The Aeta are multiple different Negrito indigenous people who live in scattered, isolated mountainous parts of the island of Luzon. As Negritos, they have skin ranges from dark to very dark brown, and possess features such as a small stature and frame; hair of a curly to kinky texture and a higher frequency of naturally lighter colour (blondism) relative to the general population, small nose, and dark brown eyes.

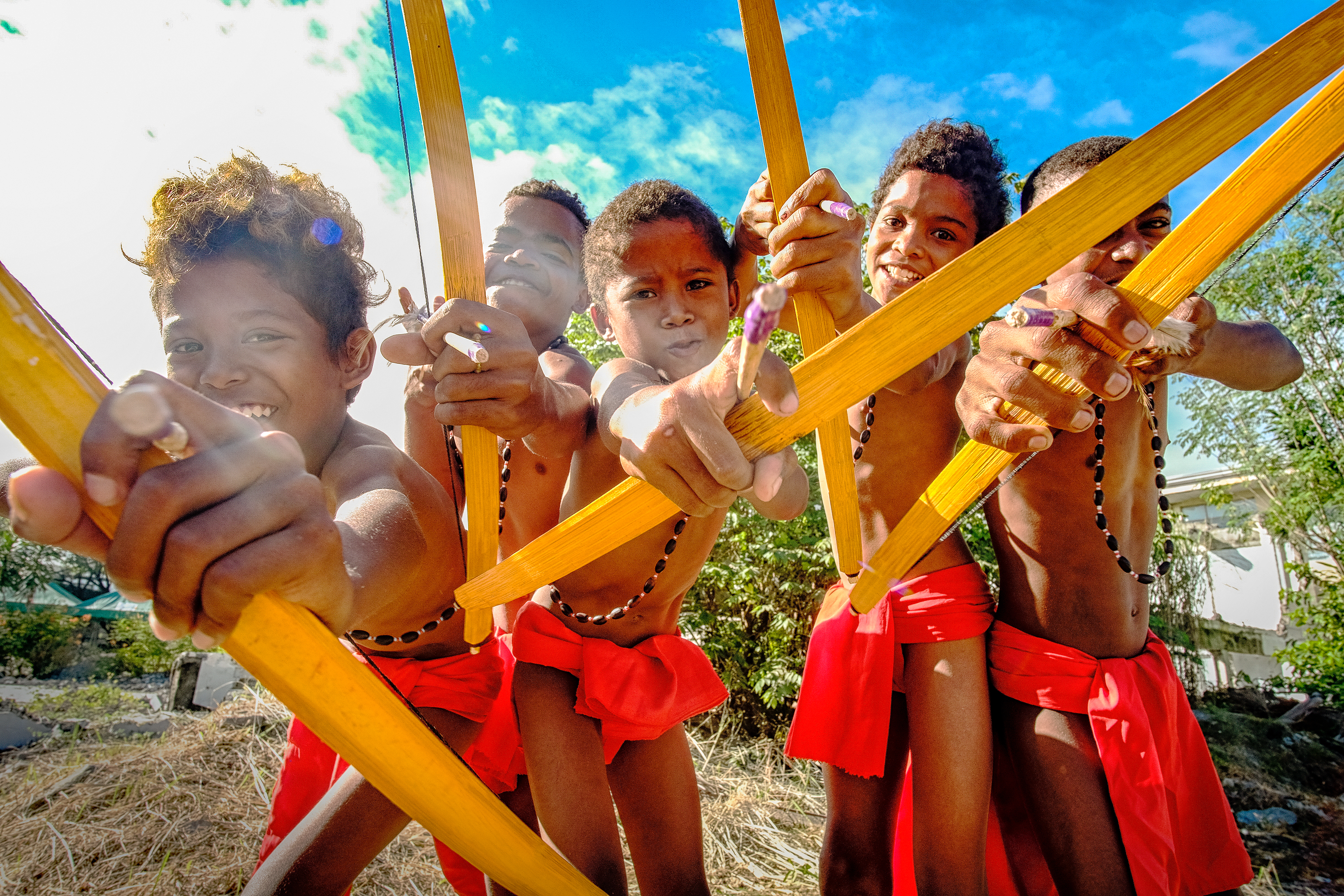
Aeta or Agta children from Central Luzon holding a traditional bow

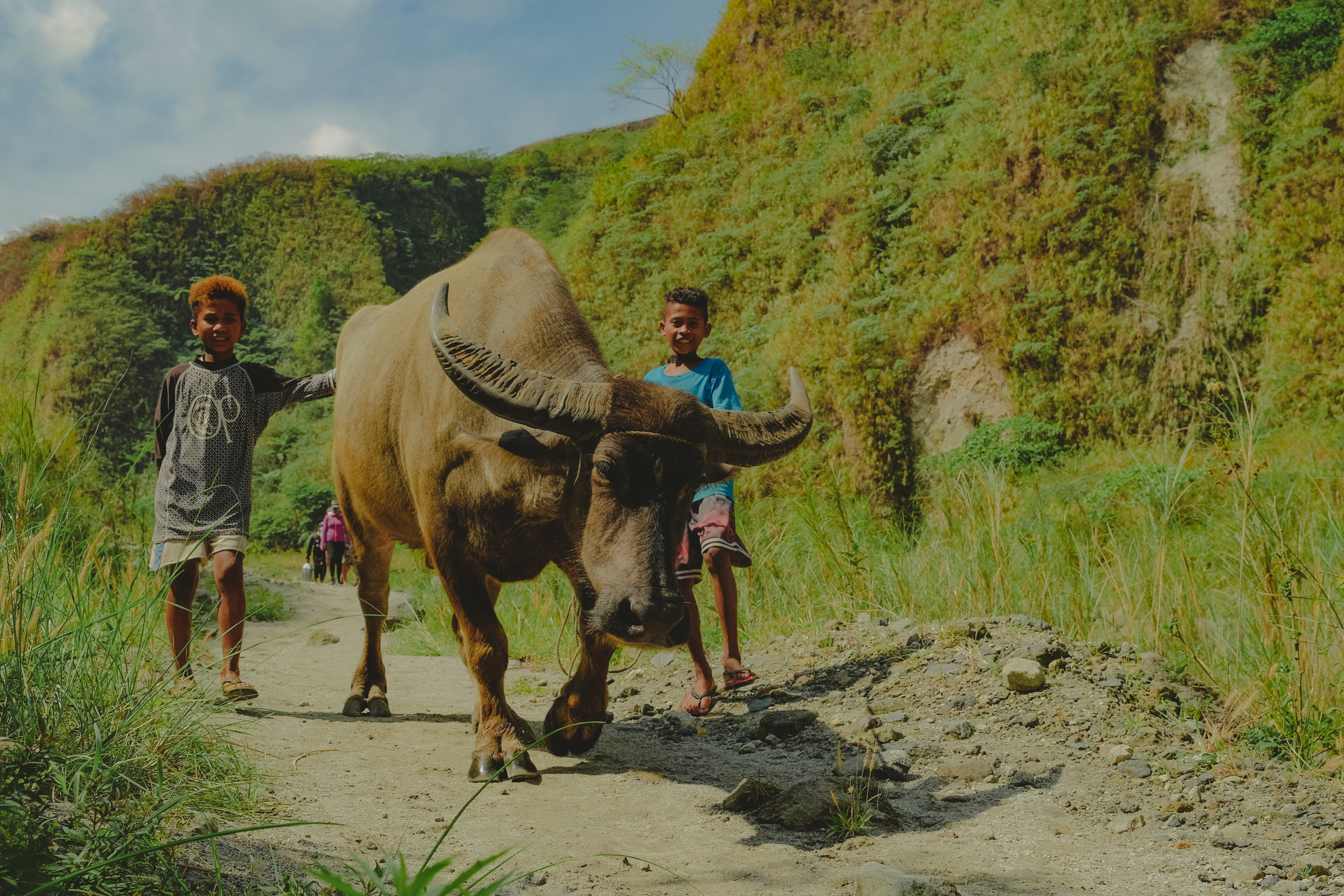
Aeta children with their carabao in the Mt. Pinatubo area

They are thought to be among the earliest inhabitants of the Philippines, preceding the Austronesian migrations. The Aeta were included in the group of people named "Negrito" during the Spanish Era. Various Aeta groups in northern Luzon are named Pugut or Pugot, an Ilocano term that also means "goblin" or "forest spirit", and is the colloquial term for people with darker complexions. These names are mostly considered inappropriate or derogatory by fellow Aeta of northern Luzon. The Aeta speak Sambalic languages, which are part of the Central Luzon family.

=== Dumagat ===
The Dumagats are one of the major groups of indigenous peoples living in the Southern Tagalog and Central Luzon region south of Manila. The Dumagats, now numbering only about 43,143, inhabit the fertile Sierra Madre Ranges on Quezon province's northern tip. A large throng of this ethnic tribe can be found in the town of General Nakar, while a few of them can be spotted in three municipalities of Polillo island. The Dumagat has 4 distinct groups the Dumagat-Edimala, Dumagat-Remontado and Dumagat-Tagebolus. Primarily, the Dumagats depend on farming, kaingin (orchard farming or slash-and-burn agriculture), paid labor, vending logs and other forest commodities as livelihood. Secondarily, they rely on fishing, hunting animals, gathering crops and other natural bounties for survival. Loan dependence (usury) has reduced many of them to dismal poverty.

=== Batak ===
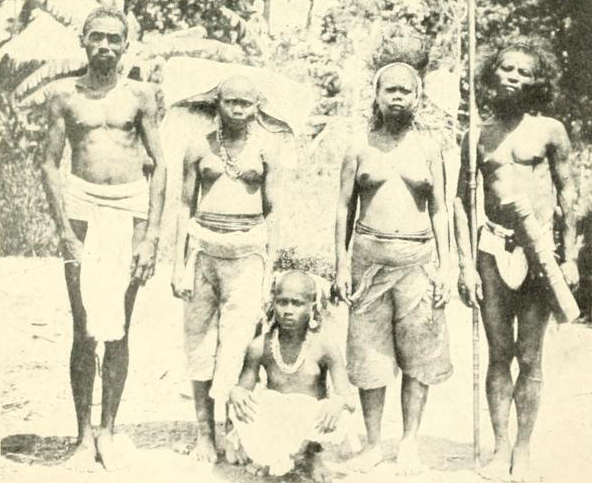
Group of Bataks, 1913

The Batak are a group of indigenous Filipino people that resides in the northeast portion of Palawan. There are only about 450 Batak remaining according to a 1990 census. Also called Tinitianes, the Batak are considered by anthropologists to be closely related to the Aeta of Central Luzon. They tend to be small in stature, with dark skin and short curly or "kinky" hair, traits which originally garnered the "Negrito" groups their name.

They speak the Batak language, which is a Negrito language spoken in Palawan. It is sometimes disambiguated from the Batak languages of Indonesia as Palawan Batak. They can be found in the communities of Babuyan, Maoyon, Tanabag, Langogan, Tagnipa, Caramay, and Buayan in Palawan. They also speak the surrounding languages including Southern Tagbanwa, Central Tagbanwa, Kuyonon, and Agutaynen.

=== Ati ===
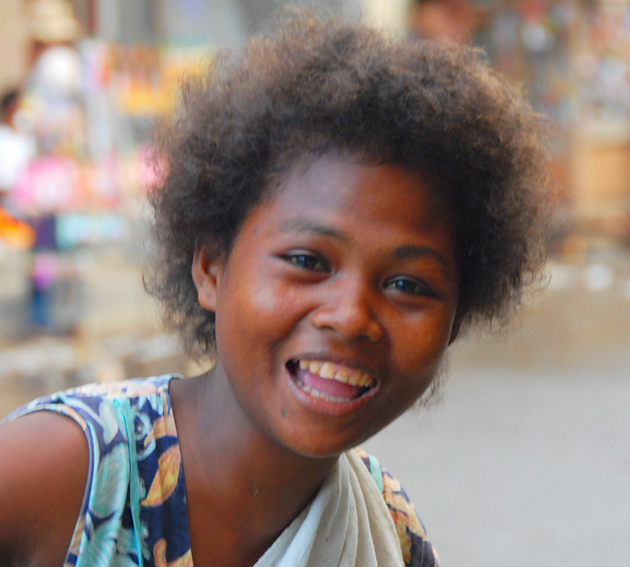
An Ati woman in Aklan, 2006

The Ati are a Negrito ethnic group in the Visayas, the central portion of the Philippine archipelago. Their small numbers are principally concentrated in the islands of Boracay, Panay and Negros. They are genetically related to other Negrito ethnic groups in the Philippines such as the Aeta of Luzon, the Batak of Palawan, and the Mamanwa of Mindanao. The Ati speak a Visayan language known as Inati. As of 1980, the speakers of Inati number about 1,500. Hiligaynon and Kinaray-a are also commonly used.

=== Mamanwa ===
The Mamanwa is a Negrito tribe often grouped together with the Lumad. They come from Leyte, Agusan del Norte, and Surigao provinces in Mindanao; primarily in Kitcharao and Santiago, Agusan del Norte, though they are lesser in number and more scattered and nomadic than the Manobos and Mandaya tribes who also inhabit the region. Like all Negritos, the Mamanwas are phenotypically distinct from the lowlanders and the upland living Manobos, exhibiting curly hair and much darker skin tones. These peoples are traditionally hunter-gatherers and consume a wide variety of wild plants, herbs, insects, and animals from tropical rainforest. Currently, Mamanwa populations live in sedentary settlements ("barangays") that are close to agricultural peoples and market centers. As a result, a substantial proportion of their diet includes starch-dense domesticated foods.

The Mamanwa have been exposed to many of the modernities mainstream agricultural populations possess and use such as cell phones, televisions, radio, processed foods, etc. Their contact with monotheist communities/populations has made a considerable impact on the Mamanwa's religious practices. The tribe produce excellent winnowing baskets, rattan hammocks, and other household containers. Mamanwa (also spelled Mamanoa) means 'first forest dwellers', from the words man (first) and banwa (forest). They speak the Mamanwa language (or Minamanwa). They are genetically related to the Denisovans.

== Lumad ethnolinguistic groups ==
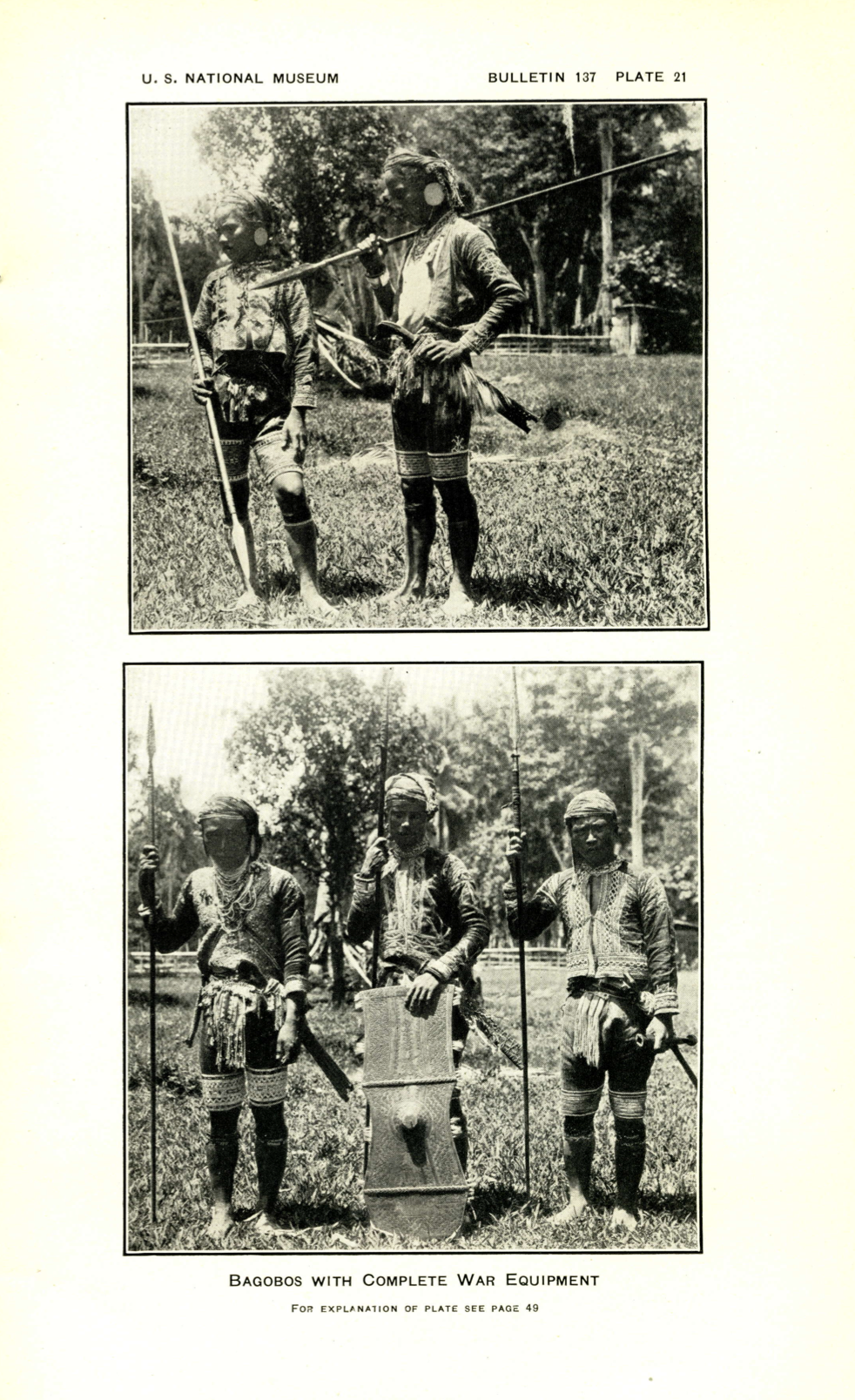
A 1926 photograph of Bagobo (Manobo) warriors in full war regalia

The Lumad are the un-Islamized and un-Christianized (or only recently Christianized) indigenous Austronesian peoples of Mindanao. They include several ethnolinguistic groups such as the Manobo, the Tasaday, the Mamanwa, the Mandaya, the B'laan, the T'boli, and the Kalagan. They primarily inhabit the eastern parts of Mindanao such as the Caraga, and Davao Regions.

=== Subanon ===
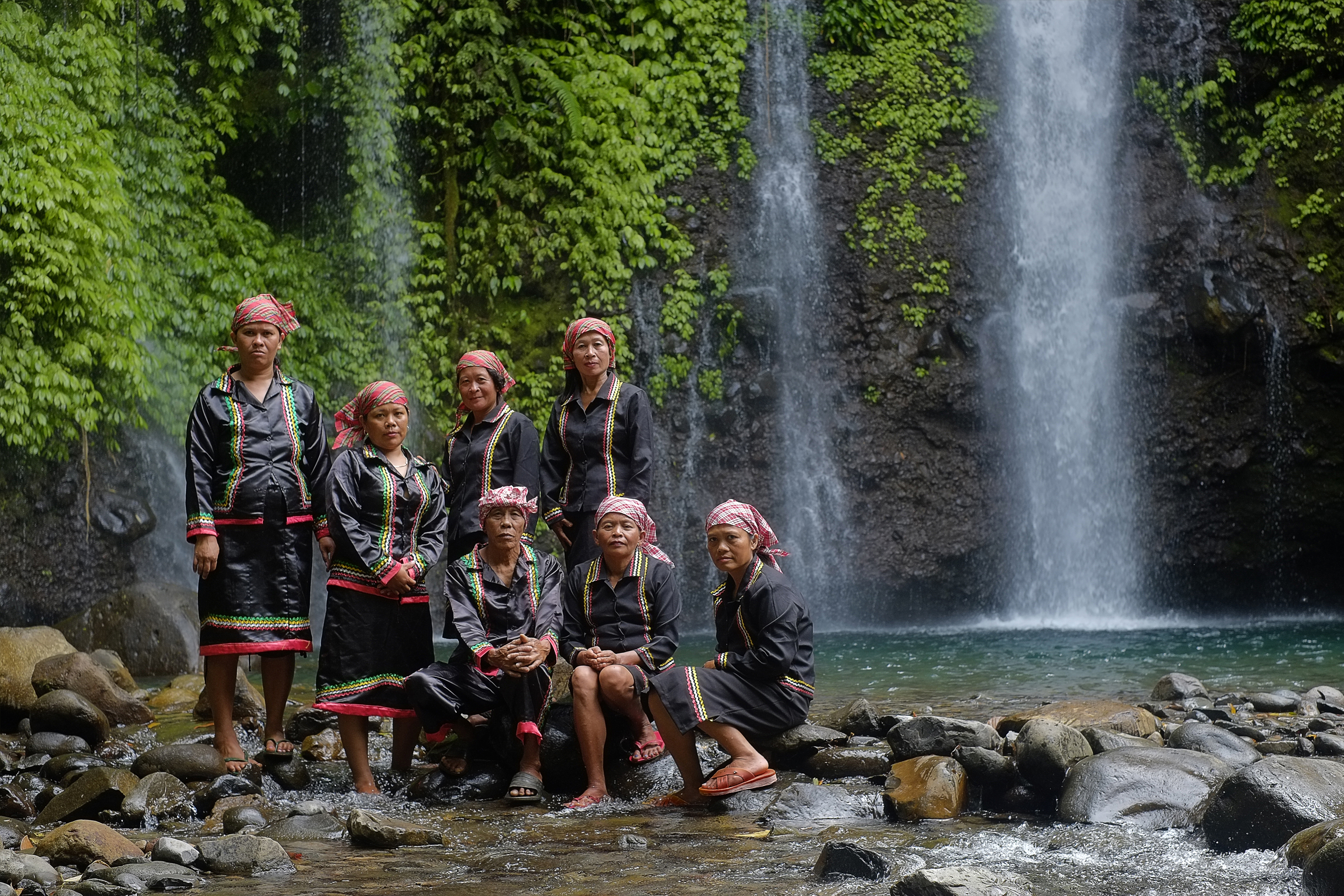
Subanen people, 2017

Subanon or Subanu (also called Subanen or Subanun) is a Subanon word meaning "from the river." The term is derived from the root soba or suba (meaning "river") and the suffix -nun or -non which indicates locality or place of origin. Subanon are also known as "Subanen" because some Subanen languages use a pepet vowel where others use o. The Subanon people are the largest lumad group (non-Muslim or non-Christian indigenous cultural community) on the island of Mindanao. This ethnic group were the aborigines of western Mindanao particularly in the Zamboanga Peninsula areas which are divided into the provinces of Zamboanga del Sur, Zamboanga del Norte, and Zamboanga Sibugay, Basilan, Misamis Occidental, and extended to the province of Misamis Oriental. The Subanon people speak the Subanon language. Some also speak Chavacano Zamboangueño and Cebuano.

As the name implies, these people originally lived along riverbanks in the lowlands, however due to disturbances and competitions from related groups such as the Muslim Maguindanaon and Christian Bisaya, these peace-loving people are now found residing in the mountains. The Subanons regularly move from one location to another to clear more forest for fields. They cultivate crops, with rice as the most important crop, but they are also known to raise livestock including pigs, chickens, cattle, and water buffaloes. Subanon houses are built along hillsides and ridges overlooking family fields. The homes are usually rectangular and raised on stilts with thatched roofs.

=== Mamanwa ===
The Mamanwa is a Negrito tribe often grouped together with the Lumad. They come from Leyte, Agusan del Norte, and Surigao provinces in Mindanao; primarily in Kitcharao and Santiago, Agusan del Norte, though they are lesser in number and more scattered and nomadic than the Manobos and Mandaya tribes who also inhabit the region. Like all Negritos, the Mamanwas are phenotypically distinct from the lowlanders and the upland living Manobos, exhibiting curly hair and much darker skin tones. These peoples are traditionally hunter-gatherers and consume a wide variety of wild plants, herbs, insects, and animals from tropical rainforest. Currently, Mamanwa populations live in sedentary settlements ("barangays") that are close to agricultural peoples and market centers. As a result, a substantial proportion of their diet includes starch-dense domesticated foods. The Mamanwa have been exposed to many of the modernities mainstream agricultural populations possess and use such as cell phones, televisions, radio, processed foods, etc. Their contact with monotheist communities/populations has made a considerable impact on the Mamanwa's religious practices. The tribe produce excellent winnowing baskets, rattan hammocks, and other household containers. Mamanwa (also spelled Mamanoa) means 'first forest dwellers', from the words man (first) and banwa (forest). They speak the Mamanwa language (or Minamanwa). They are genetically related to the Denisovans.

=== Manobo/Banobo ===
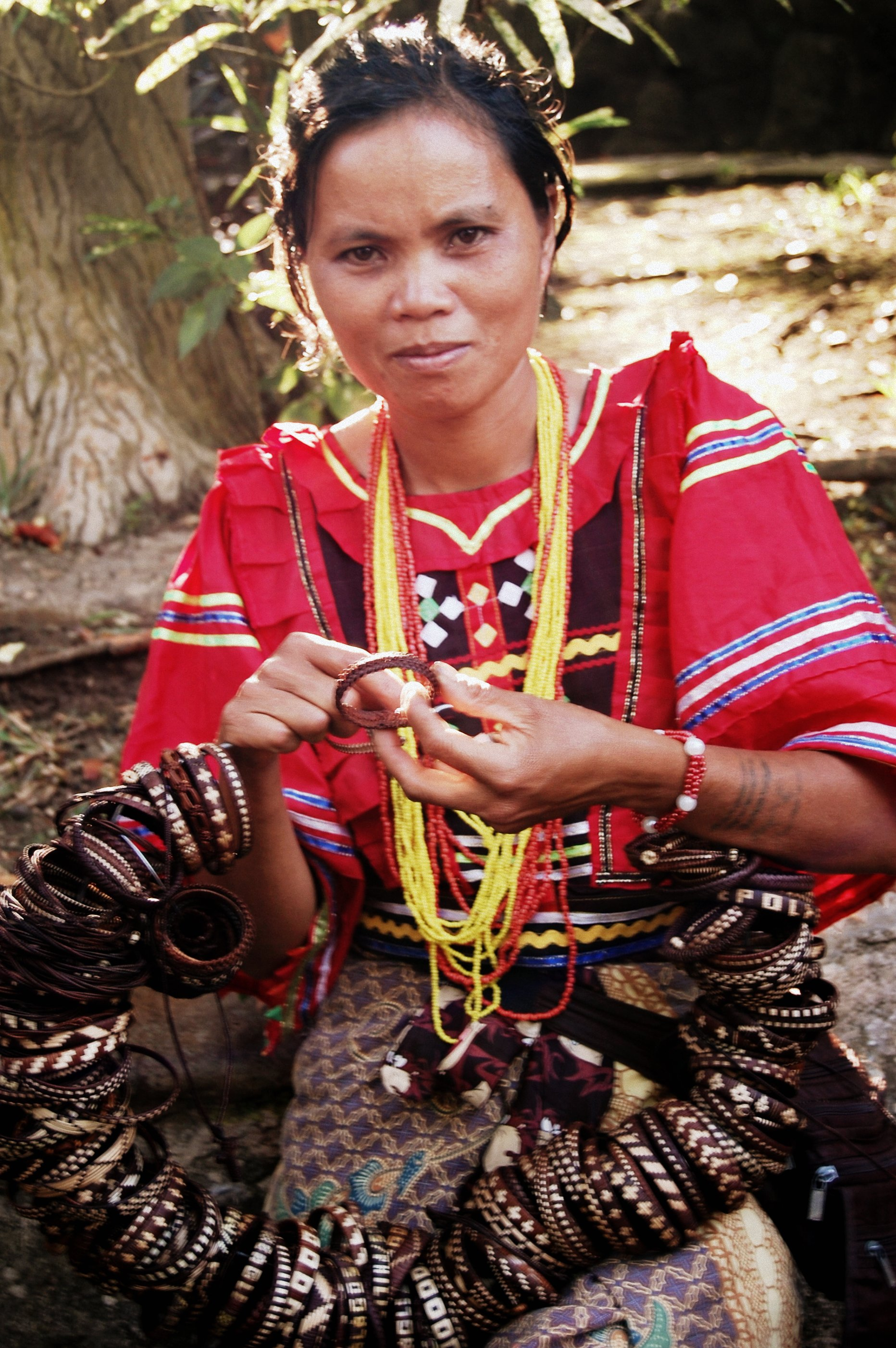
A Manobo woman from Davao, 2010

The Manobo are an Austronesian, indigenous agriculturalist population who neighbor the Mamanwa group in Surigao del Norte and Surigao del Sur. They live in barangays like the Mamanwa; however, they are more numerous. The two groups interact frequently although the amount of interaction varies between settlements and intermarriage is common between them. The total Manobo population is not known, although they occupy core areas from Sarangani island into the Mindanao mainland in the provinces of the Davao Region, Agusan del Sur, Bukidnon, Cotabato, and South Cotabato. The groups occupy such a wide area of distribution that localized groups have assumed the character of distinctiveness as a separate ethnic grouping such as the Bagobo or the Higaonon, and the Atta. The Manobo are genetically related to the Denisovans, much like the Mamanwa. They speak the Manobo languages. A 2021 genetic study show that Manobos have ancestral affinity with the Austroasiatic Mlabri and Htin peoples of mainland Southeast Asia.

=== Higaonon ===
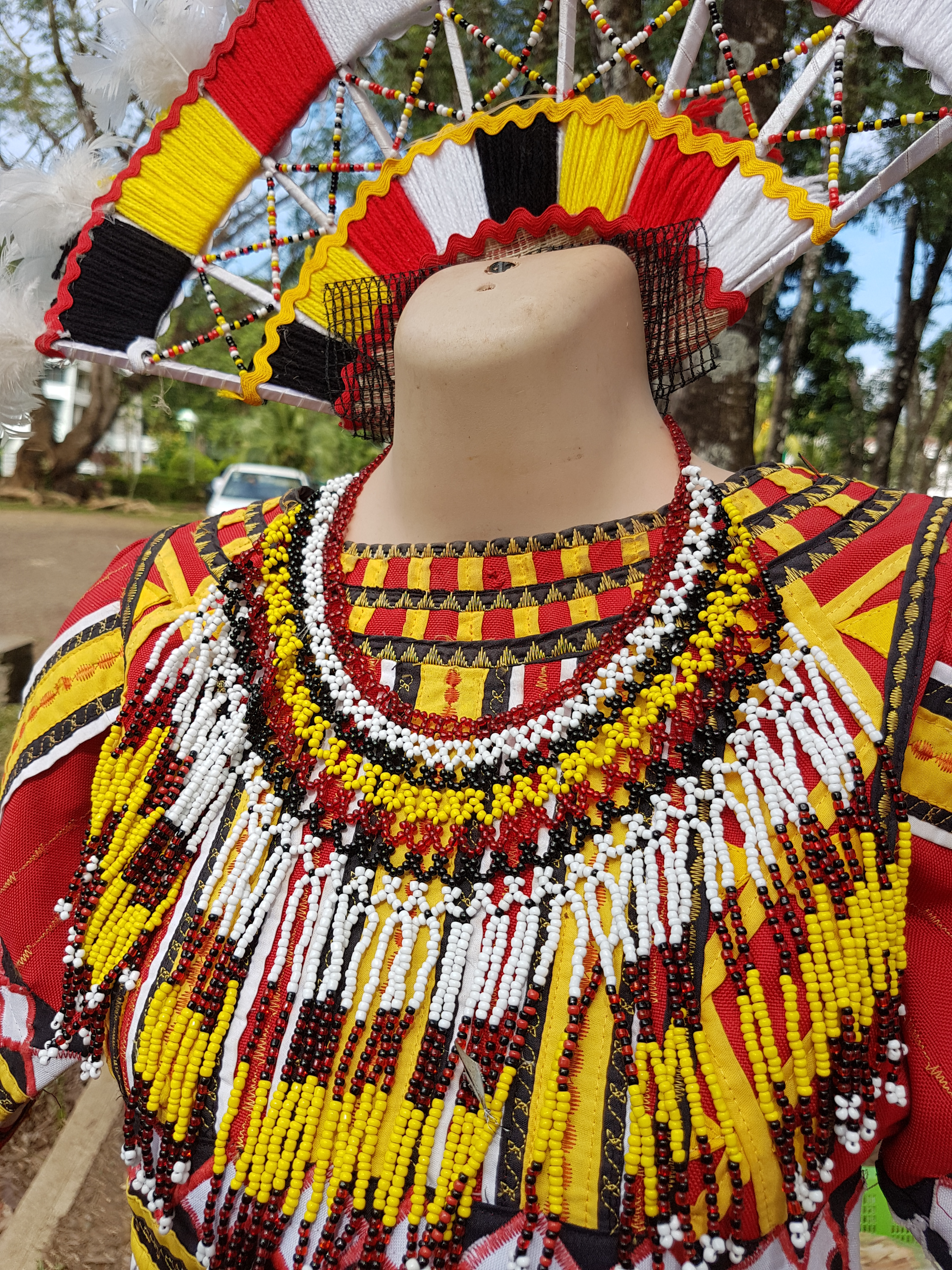
Higaonon traditional women's attire

The Higaonon is located on the provinces of Bukidnon, Agusan del Sur, Misamis Oriental, Camiguin (used to be Kamiguing), Rogongon in Iligan City, and Lanao del Norte. The Higaonons have a rather traditional way of living. Farming is the most important economic activity. The word Higaonon is derived from the word "Higad" in the Higaonon dialect which means coastal plains and "Gaon" meaning ascend to the mountains. Taken together, Higaonon, means the people of the coastal plains that ascended to the mountains. Higaonons were formerly coastal people of the provinces as mentioned who resisted the Spanish occupation and later avoided contact with influx of seafaring settlers from Luzon and Visayas, whom they refer as Dumagats. Driven to the hills and mountains these people continued to exist and fought for the preservation of the people, heritage and culture. They speak the Higaonon language, which is partially intelligible with Binukid. However, because of the mass influx of Cebuano migrants to Mindanao, many of the Higaonons people tend to be exposed to the Cebuano language from Visayas easily enough to be able to speak it.

=== Bukidnon ===
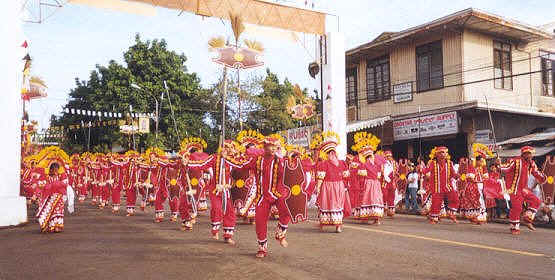
Kaamulan Festival

The Bukidnon Lumad people are one of the seven tribes in the Bukidnon plateau of Mindanao. Bukidnon means 'that of the mountains or highlands' (i.e., 'people of the mountains or highlands'), despite the fact that most Bukidnon tribes settle in the lowlands. They speak the Bukid language, also called Binukid or Bukidnon. It is a de facto co-official language in Bukidnon province, where it is referred to as Higaonon. There are many dialects but there is mutual intelligibility. The dialect of Malaybalay, in the Pulangi area, is considered to be the prestige and standard variety. The Bukidnon people believe in one god, Magbabaya (Ruler of All), though there are several minor gods and goddesses that they worship as well. Religious rites are presided by a baylan whose ordination is voluntary and may come from any sex. The Bukidnons have rich musical and oral traditions which are celebrated annually in Malaybalay city's Kaamulan Festival, with other tribes in Bukidnon (the Manobo tribes, the Higaonon, Matigsalug, Talaandig, Umayamnom, and the Tigwahanon).

The Bukidnon Lumad is distinct and should not be confused with a few indigenous peoples scattered in the Visayas area who are also alternatively called Bukidnon.

=== Talaandig ===
Talaandig are originally from the foothills of Mount Kitanglad in Bukidnon, specifically in the municipalities of Talakag and Lantapan. They speak the Talaandig language, which is a dialect of Bukid language.

=== Umayamnon ===
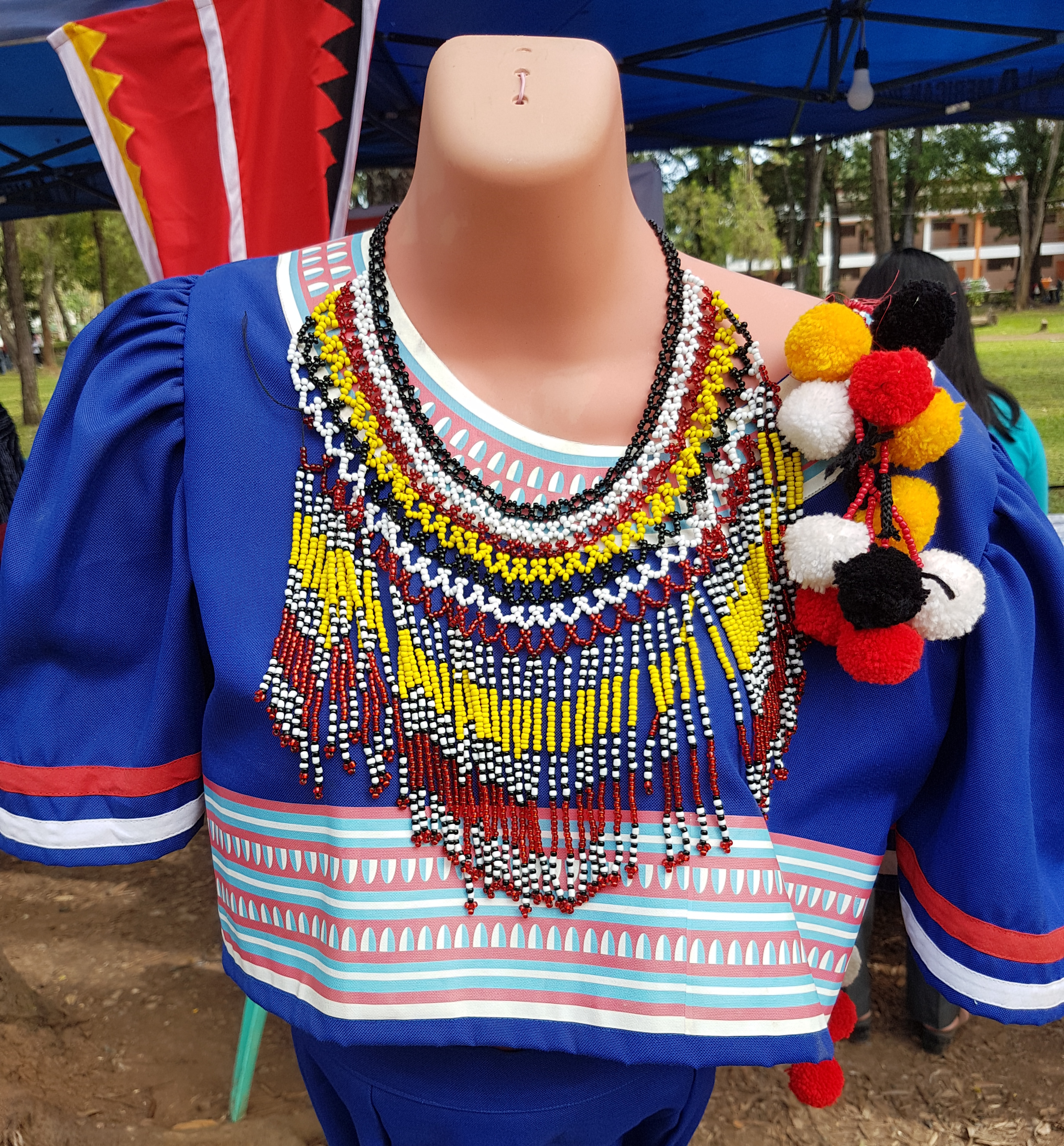
Umayamnon traditional women's attire

The Umayamnon are originally from the Umayam River watershed and the headwaters of the Pulangi River. They reside in Bukidnon and are a subgroup of the Manobo.

=== Tigwahonon ===
The Tigwahonon are a subgroup of Manobo originally from the Tigwa River basin near San Fernando, Bukidnon. They speak Tigwa, which is a dialect of Matigsalug.

=== Matigsalug ===
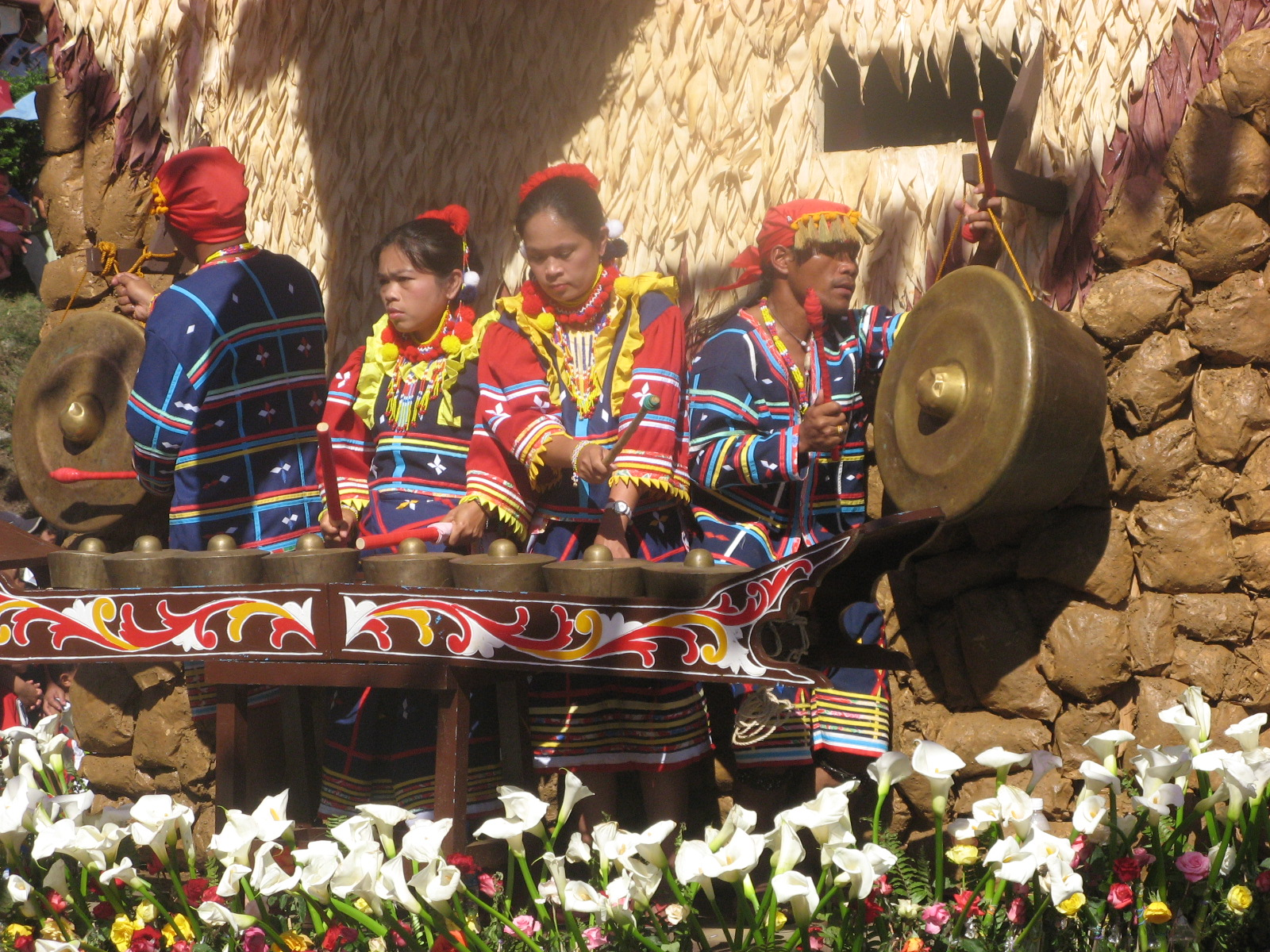
Matigsalug kulintang ensemble, 2007

The Matigsalug are the Bukidnon groups who are found in the Tigwa-Salug Valley in San Fernando in Bukidnon province, Philippines. "Matigsalug" is a term, which means "people along the Salug River (a tributary of the Davao River)". Although often classified under the Manobo ethnolinguistic group, the Matigsalug is a distinct sub-group of indigenous peoples from the Manobos. The Matigsalug of Bukidnon have an approximate population of 146,500. They speak the Matigsalug language, which is a Manobo language.

=== Manguwangan ===
The Manguwangan/Manguangan/Mangguangan are found in the Cordillera Sugut mountains in Mindanao, scattering up to the great lakes of Rajah Buayan, Maguindanao del Sur and in the territory between what is occupied by the Manobo and the Mandaya in Davao and South Cotabato. They speak Mangguangan language, which is an Agusan Manobo language.

=== Kamayo ===
The Kamayo are concentrated in Bislig, Lianga, Marihatag, and San Agustin in Surigao del Sur, Mindanao. A scattered population is also found in Cateel and Baganga, Davao Oriental. They speak the Kamayo language, which is also called as Kinamayo, Camayo, Kadi, Kinadi, or Mandaya. It is a language widely used by the Mandayas in the Davao Oriental areas. It is closely related to Tandaganon and Surigaonon. Dialect variations are caused by mixed dialect communications such as the Cebuano language in barangays Mangagoy & Pob. Bislig. The towns of Barobo, Hinatuan, and Lingig has a distinct version spoken.

=== Kalagan ===
The Kalagans are the Islamized-indigenous people in the Western Davao gulf area. They became Muslim in the middle of the 19th century due to a combination of following factors namely, the political pressure and/or influence of the Tausug migrants of Davao, extensive exposure and/or contact with the communities of their Maguindanaon neighbors, inter-marriages of Kalagan and Maguindanaon and/or Tausug. They are predominantly found in Davao City, district of Sirawan, around Tagum, Davao del Norte, Mati in Davao Oriental, some places in Davao del Sur and two other Davao provinces. The Kalagan language is similar to the Tagakaolo language but have increasingly incorporated some Tausug and Maguindanaon words. They are renowned as agriculturalists, cultivating rice, corn, abaca, and coconut for cash crops, whereas their counterparts living along the coast, practice fishing. Some also know Cebuano, Filipino(Tagalog), English, and Arabic.

=== Mansaka ===
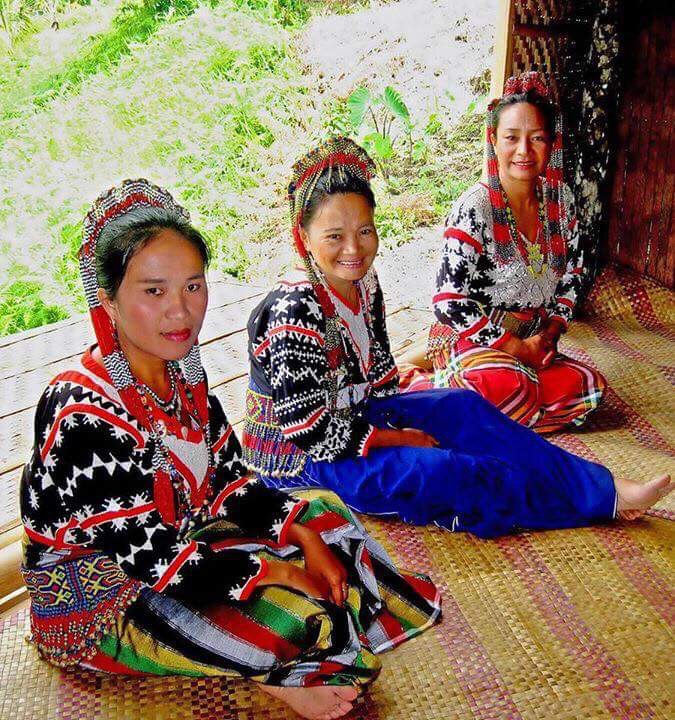
Mansaka women in traditional attire

The term "Mansaka" derives from "man" with literal meaning "first" and "saka" meaning "to ascend," and means "the first people to ascend mountains/upstream." The term most likely describes the origin of these people who are found today in Davao del Norte and Davao del Sur. Specifically in the Batoto River, the Manat Valley, Caragan, Maragusan, the Hijo River Valley, and the seacoasts of Kingking, Maco, Kwambog, Hijo, Tagum, Libuganon, Tuganay, Ising, and Panabo. They speak the Mansaka language, which may be intelligible with Mandaya.

=== Mandaya ===
"Mandaya" derives from "man" meaning "first," and "daya" meaning "upstream" or "upper portion of a river," and therefore means "the first people upstream". It refers to a number of groups found along the mountain ranges of Davao Oriental, as well as to their customs, language, and beliefs. The Mandaya are also found in Compostela and New Bataan in Davao de Oro (formerly a part of Davao del Norte Province). They speak the Mandaya language, which may be intelligible with Mansaka.

=== Giangan ===
The Giangan people (also known as Bagobo, Clata, Atto, Eto, Guanga, Gulanga, Jangan) live on the eastern slopes of Mount Apo in Davao del Sur Province, as well as in Davao City. They occupy a very small territory stretching from Catalunan to Calinan within Davao City. They speak the Giangan languages of the South Mindanao or Bilic languages. The Lipadas River separated the traditional Tagabawa and Clata territories, while the Talomo River (Ikawayanlinan) was the boundary separating the Tagabawas, Clatas, and Obos. The Davao River separated the traditional Bagobo and Clata territories.

=== Tagabawa ===
Tagabawa or Bagobo-Tagabawa are an indigenous tribe in Mindanao. They speak the Tagabawa language, which is a Manobo language, and live in Cotabato, Davao del Sur, and in the surrounding areas of Mt. Apo by Davao City. They have a culture of high respect towards Philippine eagles, known in their language as banog.

=== Teduray ===
The Teduray/Tiruray people live in the municipalities of Datu Blah T. Sinsuat, Upi, and South Upi in southwestern Maguindanao del Sur; and in Lebak municipality, northwestern Sultan Kudarat Province. They speak the Tiruray language, which is related to Bagobo, B'laan, and T'boli. Coastal Tirurays are mostly farmers, hunters, fishermen, and basket weavers; those living in the mountains engage in dry field agriculture, supplemented by hunting and the gathering of forest products. Tirurays are famous for their craftsmanship in weaving baskets with two-toned geometric designs. While many have adopted the cultures of neighboring Muslims and Christians people, a high percentage of their population still believe and practice their indigenous customs and rituals.

=== Tagakaulo ===
Tagakaulo is one of the Lumad tribes in Mindanao. Their traditional territories is in Davao del Sur and Sarangani particularly in the localities of Malalag, Lais, Talaguton Rivers, Sta. Maria, and Malita of Davao Occidental, and Malungon of the Sarangani Province. Tagakaulo means living in mountain. The Tagakaulo tribe originally came from the western shores of the gulf of Davao and south of Mt. Apo. a long time ago. They speak the Tagakaulo language, which is a part of the Kalagan languages.

=== Tasaday ===
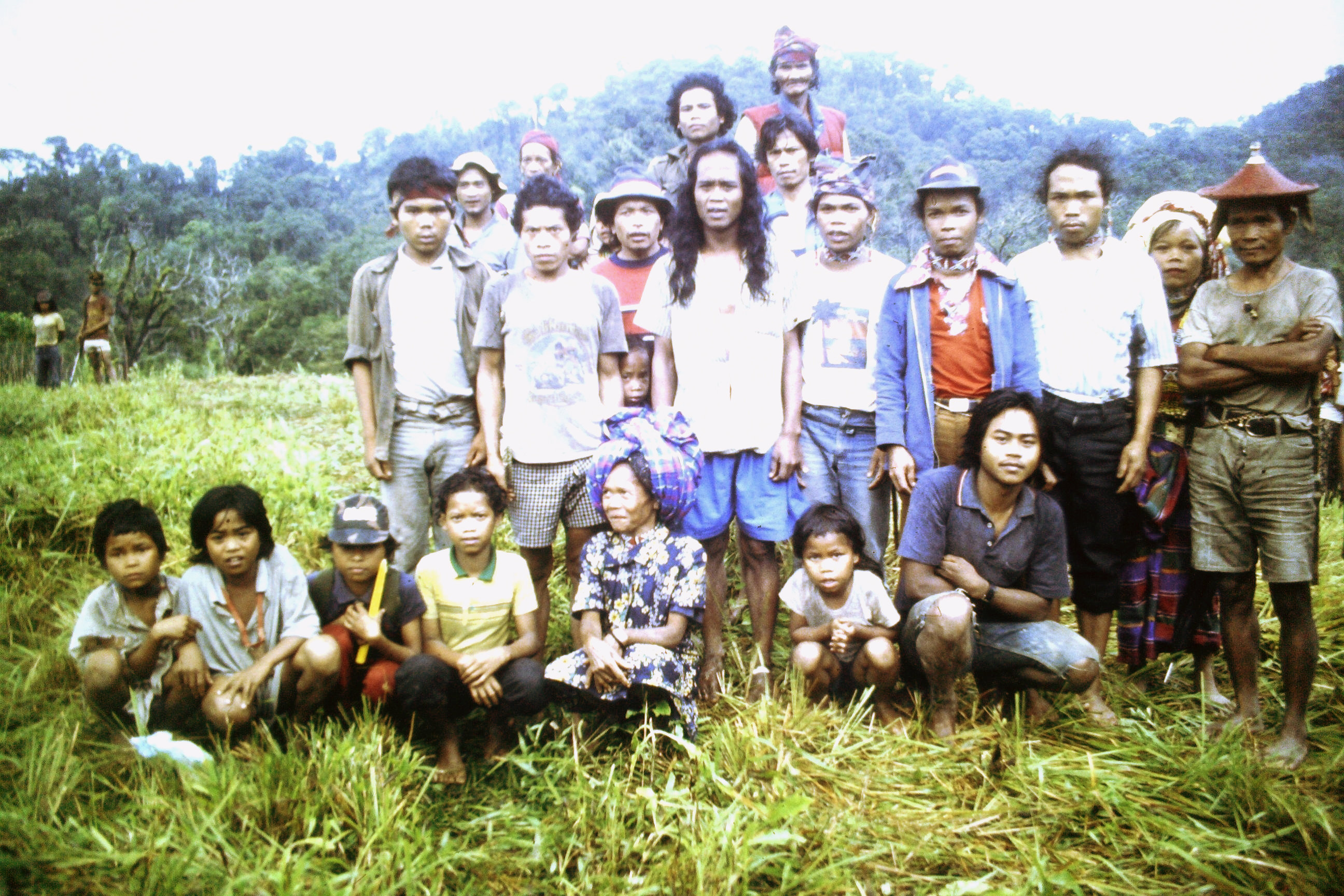
Tasaday people

The Tasaday ([tɑˈsɑdɑj]) are an indigenous Lumad people of Mindanao. They attracted widespread media attention in 1971, when a journalist of the Manila Associated Press bureau chief reported their discovery, amid apparent "Stone Age" technology and in complete isolation from the rest of Philippine society. They again attracted attention in the 1980s when some accused the Tasaday living in the jungle and speaking in their dialect as being part of an elaborate hoax, and doubt was raised about their isolation and even about being a separate ethnic group. Further research has tended to support their being a tribe that was isolated until 1971 and that lived as nomadic hunter-gatherers. The Tasaday language is distinct from that of neighbouring tribes, and linguists believe it probably split from the adjacent Manobo languages 200 years ago. Some also know Cebuano and Tagalog.

=== B'laan ===
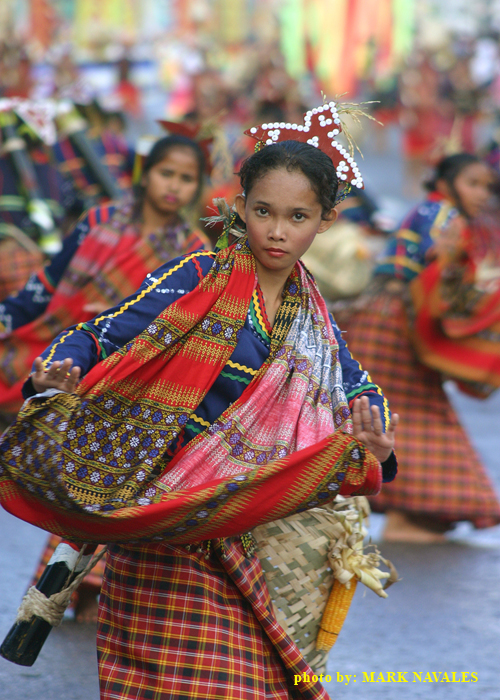
B'laan dance during the T'nalak Festival in Koronadal, South Cotabato

The Blaan people, alternatively spelled as "B'laan", are one of the indigenous peoples of Southern Mindanao in the Philippines. Their name could have derived from "bla" meaning "opponent" and the suffix "an" meaning "people". Other terms used to refer to this group are Blaan, Bira-an, Baraan, Vilanes, and Bilanes. Some Blaan natives were displaced when General Santos was founded in 1939. Others settled in the city. They speak the Blaan language which is said to be the source of the name for Koronadal City, from two Blaan words – kalon meaning cogon grass and nadal or datal meaning plain, which aptly described the place to the natives. On the other hand, Marbel, which is another name for the poblacion, is a Blaan term Malb-el which means "murky waters" referring to a river, now called Marbel River.

The tribe practices indigenous rituals while adapting to the way of life of modern Filipinos. Some also speak Cebuano, Filipino, and English. A 2021 genetic study by Maxmilian Larena shows that the Blaan people have Papuan admixture.

=== T'boli ===
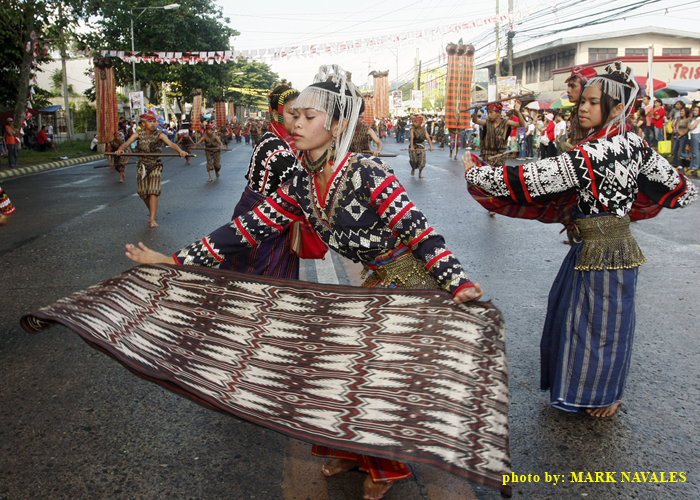
T'boli dance during the T'nalak Festival in Koronadal, South Cotabato

The T'boli are one of the indigenous peoples of South Mindanao around Soccsksargen and Davao Region. They are variously known as Tboli, Teboli, Tau Bilil, Tau Bulul or Tagabilil. They term themselves Tboli. Their whereabouts and identity are to some extent confused in the literature; some publications present the Teboli and the Tagabilil as distinct peoples; some locate the Tbolis to the vicinity of the Buluan Lake in the Cotabato Basin or in Agusan del Norte. The Tbolis, then, reside on the mountain slopes on either side of the upper Alah Valley and the coastal area of Maitum, Maasim and Kiamba. In former times, the Tbolis also inhabited the upper Alah Valley floor. They speak the Tboli language, some also know Cebuano, Hiligaynon, and Tagalog.

=== Sangil ===
The Sangil people (also called Sangir, Sangu, Marore, Sangirezen, or Talaoerezen) are originally from the Sangihe and Talaud Islands (now part of Indonesia) and parts of Davao Occidental (particularly in the Sarangani Islands), Davao del Norte, Davao del Sur, Sultan Kudarat, South Cotabato, and Cotabato. Their populations (much like the Sama-Bajau) were separated when borders were drawn between the Philippines and Indonesia during the colonial era. The Sangil people are traditionally animistic, much like other Lumad peoples. During the colonial era, the Sangil (who usually call themselves "Sangir") in the Sangihe Islands mostly converted to Protestant Christianity due to proximity and contact with the Christian Minahasa people of Sulawesi. In the Philippines, most Sangil converted to Islam due to the influence of the neighboring Sultanate of Maguindanao. However, elements of animistic rituals still remain. The Indonesian and Filipino groups still maintain ties and both Manado Malay and Cebuano are spoken in both Indonesian Sangir and Filipino Sangil, in addition to the Sangirese language. Indonesian Sangir even live in the Philippines, particularly Balut Island, Davao del Sur, Davao del Norte, Davao Oriental, Sarangani, Sultan Kudarat, Cotabato, South Cotabato, General Santos and Davao City, because of its proximity to Indonesia; they speak Cebuano & Tagalog as second languages & are Protestant Christians by faith. The exact population of Sangil people in the Philippines is unknown, but is estimated to be around 10,000 people. A study by Larena puyblished in PNAS show that the Sangirese people also possess Papuan admixture.

== Suludnon ethnolinguistic group ==
The Suludnon are highland Visayan peoples, related to the lowland Kinaray-a, Aklanon, and Hiligaynon of Panay Island, Visayas.

=== Suludnon/Sulod/Tumandok ===
The Suludnon, also known as the Tumandok, Sulod, Panay-Bukidnon, or Panayanon Sulud, are an indigenous Visayan group of people who reside in the Capiz-Lambunao mountainous area and the Antique-Iloilo mountain area of central Panay in the Visayan islands of the Philippines. They are one of the two only culturally indigenous group of Visayan language-speakers in the Western Visayas, along with the Iraynon-Bukidnon of Antique. Although they were once culturally related to the speakers of the Kinaray-a, Aklanon, and Hiligaynon languages, all of whom inhabit the lowlands of Panay, their isolation from Spanish rule resulted in the continuation of a pre-Hispanic culture and beliefs. They speak the Igbok language (also known as Ligbok or Sulod language), a member of the West Visayan subdivision of the Visayan languages under the Austronesian language family. They are the largest indigenous people's group in Panay, with a population of some 94,000 as of 2011. They are mostly slash-and-burn farmers with bisaya rice as the main crop. The Tumandok also engage in hunting, fishing, and foraging for fruits and root crops.

== Lowland ethnolinguistic groups ==
About 86-87% of the Philippine population belong to the majority ethnolinguistic groups who are classified as neither indigenous nor Moro. These groups are sometimes collectively referred to as "Lowland Christianized groups", to distinguish them from indigenous ("upland") groups and Moro peoples. These ethnic groups were annexed by the Spanish Empire and had created a distinctly united culture characterized by the mixture of cultures of Austronesian, Spanish, East-Asian and cultures from the Americas.

=== Groups in mainland Luzon ===
==== Ivatan ====
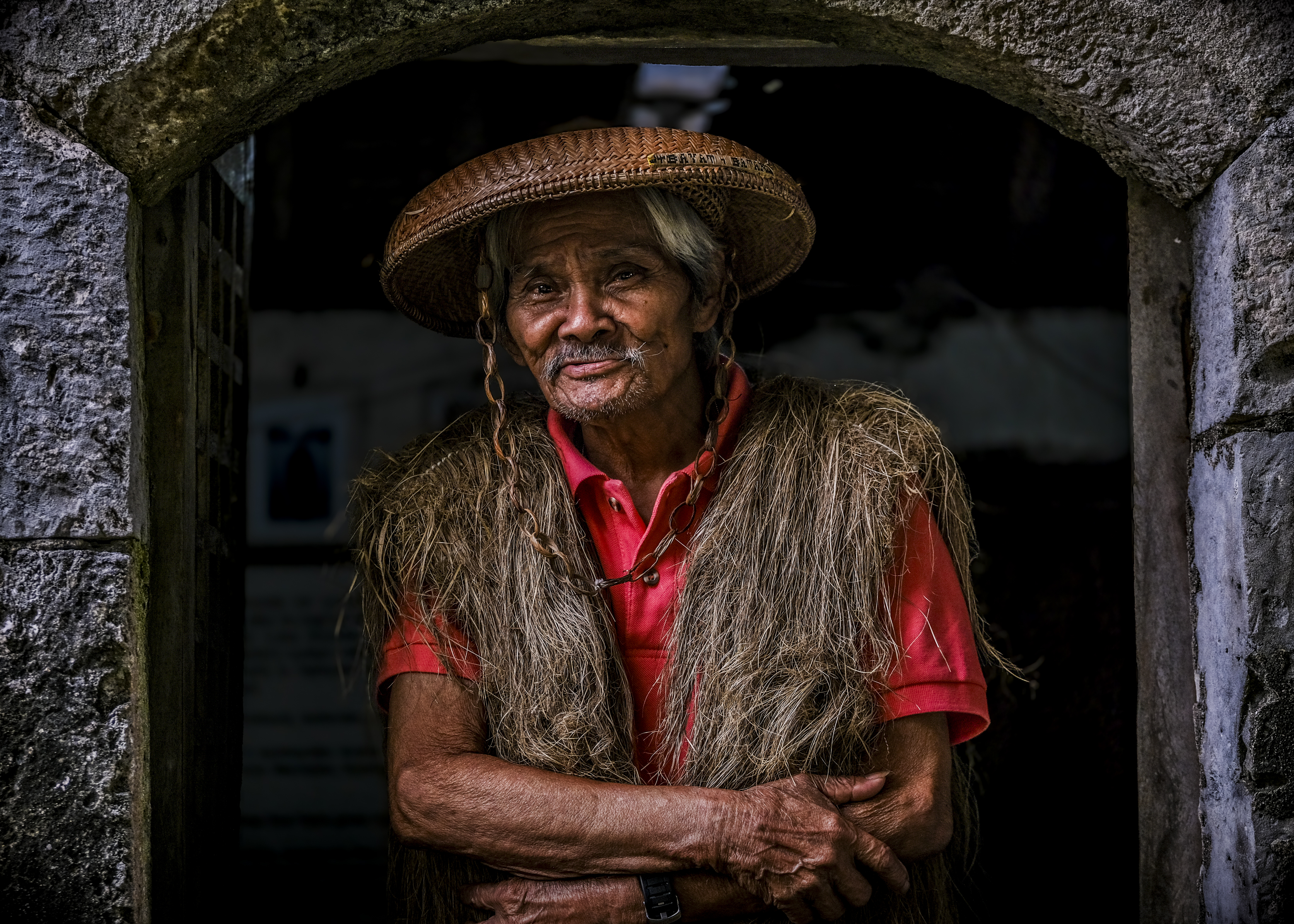
An Ivatan man wearing a 'Kanay-i,' a traditional hat for men

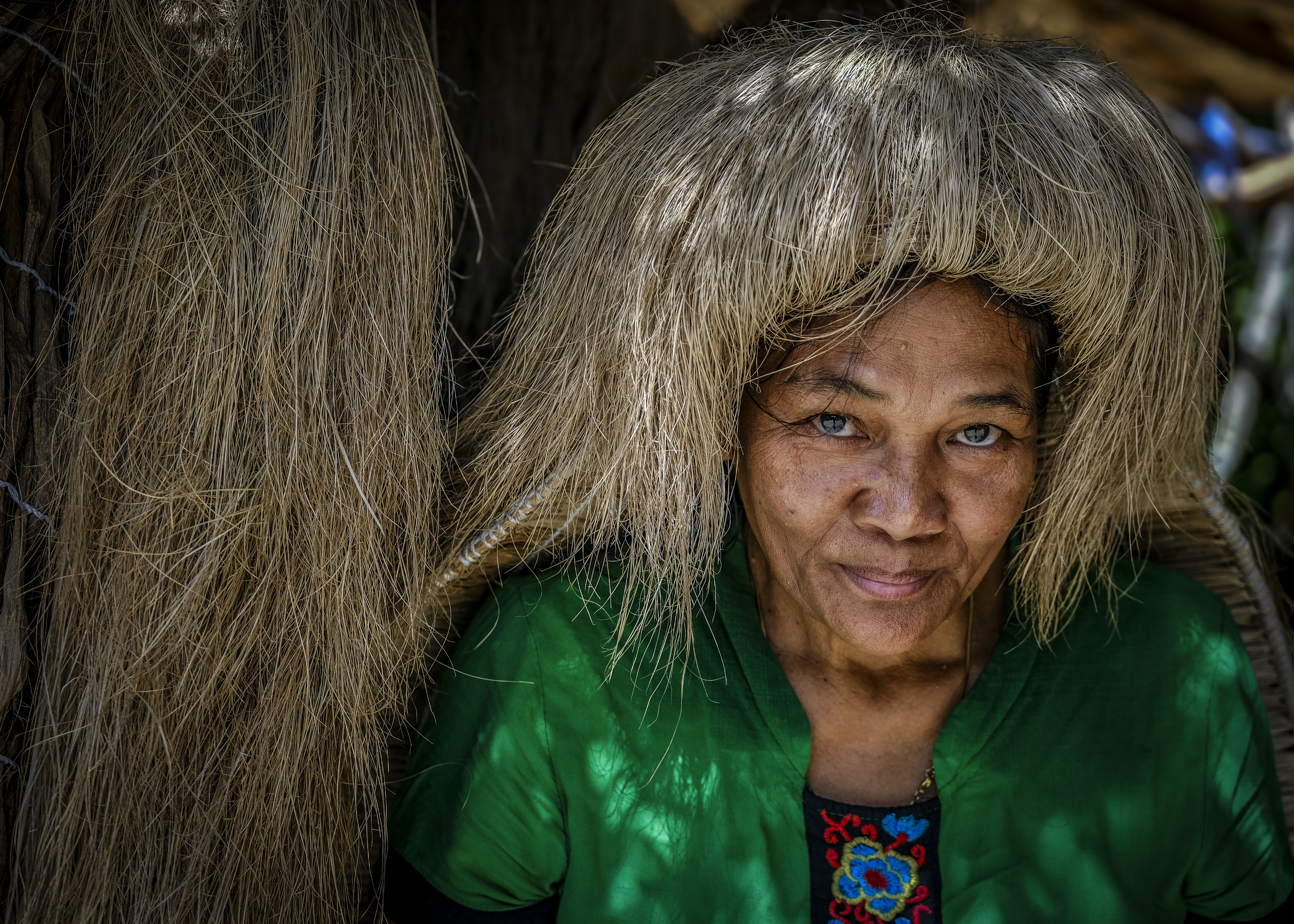
An Ivatan woman wearing a 'vakul,' a traditional headdress for women

The Ivatan (also spelled as Ibatan) are the predominant ethnolinguistic group in the Batanes islands of the Philippines. They have close cultural links with the Taiwanese aborigines, especially the Yami/Tao people of Orchid Island under jurisdiction of Taiwan. They speak Ivatan language, & also Ilocano as second language. Aside from their regional homeland, Ivatans are also found in mainland Luzon and even Mindanao due to migrations, where they even speak the other languages within the environment of other ethnic groups in areas they settled and grew up in, especially Cebuano and Hiligaynon (both in Mindanao).

==== Ilocano ====
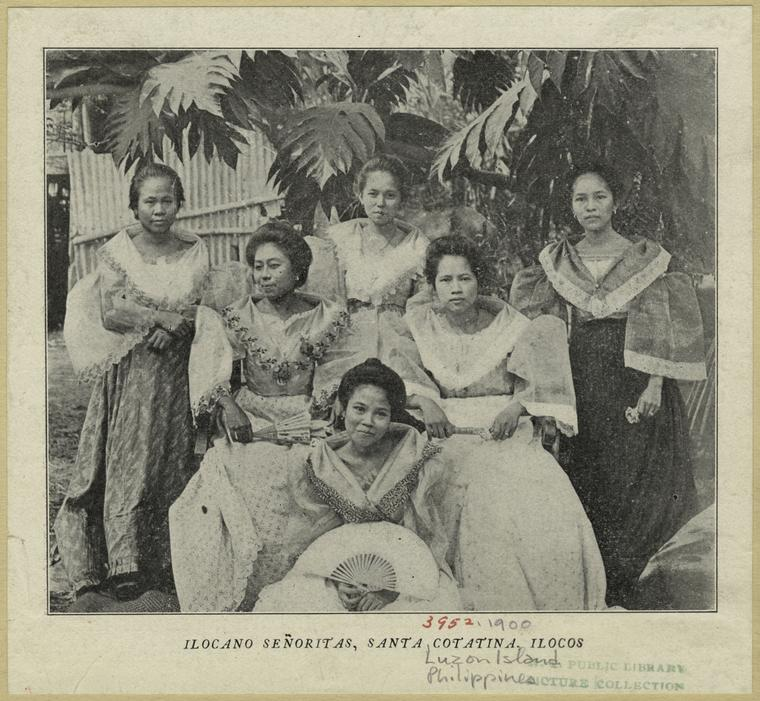
Ilocano women in circa 1900 in Santa Catalina, Ilocos Sur

The Ilocano people are the third-largest ethnic group in the Philippines with 8,746,169 population as of 2020, they are a predominantly Christian group who reside within the lowlands and coastal areas of northwestern Luzon mainly the Ilocos Region. Other Ilocanos are also found in Cordillera Administrative Region and Cagayan Valley, as well as in west and east Pangasinan. Minor pockets of Ilocanos are also found in scattered parts of Central Luzon, such as Zambales, Tarlac, Bataan, Nueva Ecija, and Aurora, in Metro Manila and in some municipalities in Mindanao, mainly in Sultan Kudarat.

They speak Iloco or Iloko with two distinct dialects the Amianan (Northern) and Abagatan (Southern) dialects. Ilocanos even speak other languages within the environment of other ethnic groups in areas they settled and grew up in, like Ibanag, Pangasinan, Ivatan, Kapampangan and Tagalog in Central Luzon, Chavacano, Hiligaynon, Cebuano, Butuanon, Surigaonon as well as Lumad and Moro languages in Mindanao. Their foremost folk literature is Biag ni Lam-ang (The Life of Lam-ang), an epic poem with similarities with the Ramayana.

==== Bolinao ====
The Bolinao people live in Bolinao and Anda, Pangasinan. They speak the Bolinao language or Binubolinao, which is the second most widely spoken Sambalic language in Pangasinan (after Sambal), & is related to Kapampangan. The language, which has more than 50,000 speakers, has been influenced by Pangasinense, Tagalog, Spanish, and English. The residents can also speak Tagalog, Pangasinense, Ilocano, and often, English as well.

==== Pangasinan ====
The Pangasinense people are the eighth-largest ethnolinguistic group in the Philippines. They predominate in the northwestern portion of Central Luzon (central and east Pangasinan, northern Tarlac, northern Nueva Ecija and northern Zambales, and selected areas of Aurora, Bataan, and Bulacan), as well as southern parts of La Union, Benguet and scattered parts of Mindanao. They are predominantly Christian (mainly Roman Catholic). They primarily use the Pangasinan language, which is spoken by more than 1.2 million individuals, & mostly speak Ilocano as second language.

==== Sambal ====
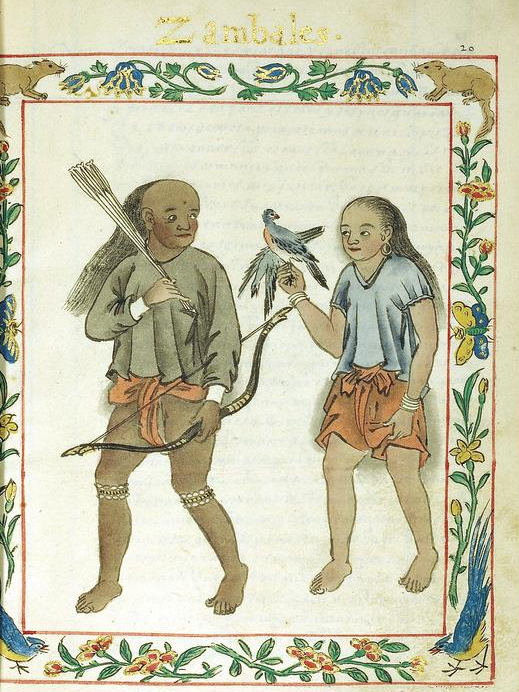
A Zambal couple, 1595, Boxer Codex

The Sambals are the inhabitants of the province of Zambales, including the independent city of Olongapo. They are also found in the neighboring municipalities of Bolinao and Anda in northwestern Pangasinan, which were under jurisdiction of Zambales and as far as Palawan, especially in Barangay Panitian in Quezon and Barangay Mandaragat in Puerto Princesa. Sambals currently make up a large proportion of the population in the Zambales municipalities of north of Iba, the provincial capital. Their language, Sambal, is related to Kapampangan. They even speak Tagalog, Ilocano, Pangasinan, & Kapampangan as second languages.

==== Kapampangan ====
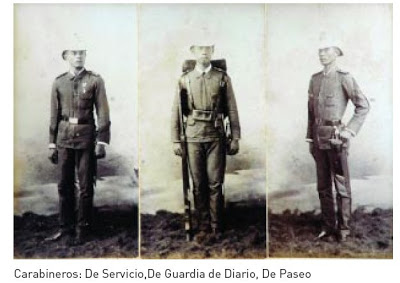
Kapampangan Carabineer Officers. circa 1800s

The Kapampangan people are the seventh-largest ethnic group in the Philippines. They predominate in the southwestern portion of Central Luzon (entire Pampanga, southern Tarlac, southwestern Nueva Ecija, southeastern Zambales, western Bulacan and northeastern Bataan, and in selected areas of Aurora) and have diasporas in Metro Manila and Mindanao. They are predominantly Christian (mainly Roman Catholic). They primarily use the Kapampangan language, which is spoken by more than 1.4 million individuals. Kapampangans even speak other languages within the environment of other ethnic groups in areas they settled and grew up in, like Sambal, Pangasinan, Ilocano, and Tagalog (all in Central Luzon) as well as Hiligaynon and Cebuano (both in Mindanao, where Kapampangans also settled). In the Spanish colonial era, Pampanga was known to be a source of valiant soldiers. There was a Kapampangan contingent in the colonial army who helped defend Manila against the Chinese Pirate Limahon. They also helped in battles against the Dutch, the English and Muslim raiders. Kapampangans, along with the Tagalogs, played a major role in the Philippine Revolution.

==== Kasiguranin ====
The Kasiguranin live in Casiguran in Aurora Province. The Kasiguranin language descends from an early Tagalog dialect that had borrowed heavily from Northeastern Luzon Agta languages such as Paranan Agta, and Filipino migrant languages like Ilocano, Visayan languages, Bikol languages, Kapampangan, and Paranan. It is 82% mutually intelligible with Paranan, a language in eastern Isabela, since Aurora and Isabela lie in close proximity. Kasiguranin speak Ilocano & Tagalog as additional languages. They rely mainly on fishing and farming, as do other groups in Casiguran.

==== Paranan ====
The Paranan or Palanan are a group that is largely concentrated on the Pacific side of the province of Isabela about Palanan Bay. The population areas are in Palanan (9,933) with a total population of some 10,925 (NSO 1980). This is probably the northeasternmost extension of the Tagalog language. There is, however, a considerable mixture with the culture of the Negrito from the Paranan Agta language. Paranan speak Ibanag, Ilocano & Tagalog as additional languages.

==== Tagalog ====
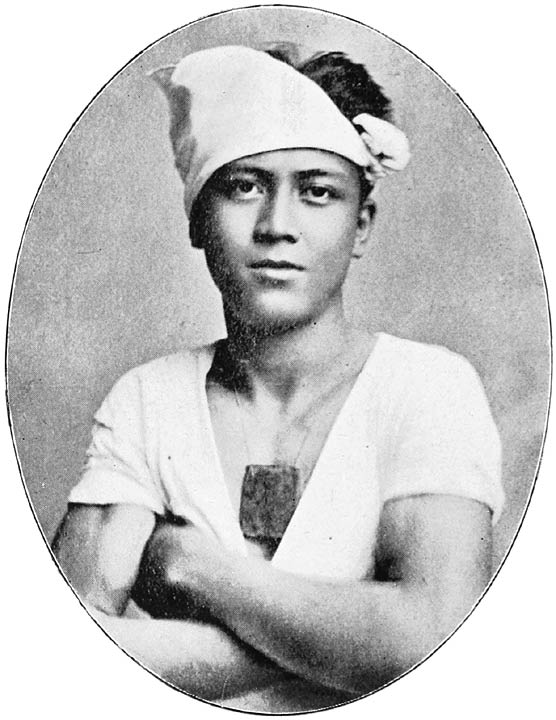
A Manila man, c. 1900

The Tagalogs are the most widespread ethnic group in the Philippines. They predominate the entirety of the Manila, mainland southern Luzon regions and the entirety of Marinduque, with a plurality in Central Luzon (mainly in its southeastern portion [Nueva Ecija, Aurora, and Bulacan], as well as parts of Zambales and Bataan provinces except Pampanga and Tarlac), coastal parts of Mindoro, major parts of Palawan and even many parts of Mindanao. The Tagalog language was chosen as an official language of the Philippines in 1935. Today, Filipino, a de facto version of Tagalog, is taught throughout the archipelago. As of the 2019 census, there were about 22.5 million speakers of Tagalog in the Philippines, 23.8 million worldwide. Tagalogs even speak other languages within the environment of other ethnic groups in areas they settled and grew up in, like Ilocano, Pangasinan, Kapampangan (all in Central Luzon) and Bicolano (in Bicol Region), as well as Cebuano, Hiligaynon, Zamboanga Chavacano, Butuanon, Surigaonon and indigenous lumad as well as Moro languages in Mindanao where they also made a significant diaspora. They speak Tagalog as a second language already outside of their native regional homeland due to assimilation to the other ethnolinguistic groups who form majority to these areas they settled and grew up in.

==== Caviteño ====
Caviteños live primarily in Cavite City and coastal Ternate, Cavite. They speak the Caviteño dialect of Chavacano, which enjoyed its widest diffusion and greatest splendor in Spanish and American period of Filipino history, when newspapers and literary outputs flourished. Residents of Paco, Ermita, Quiapo and Malate shared this common tongue with those of San Nicolas, Santa Cruz and Trozo. During the Spanish regime, it was prevalent for Spaniards, both peninsulares and insulares, to use the creole in their negotiations with the townfolk. Cavite Chabacano was spoken with relative ease because it was essentially a simplification of Castilian morphology patterned after Tagalog syntax. Gradually and naturally, it acquired the sounds present in the Spanish phonological system, which had the authocthonous phonetics as core. After World War II, creole Spanish speakers within the capital and surrounding regions went in decline or vanished entirely, leaving Caviteño and Ternateño as the remaining Tagalog-based Chavacano dialects in Luzon. A great number of Mexican men had settled at Cavite, spread throughout Luzon, and integrated with the local Philippine population. Some of these Mexicans became Tulisanes (Bandits) that led peasant revolts against Spain.

==== Ternateño ====
The Ternateño Chavacanos are found in the municipality of Ternate in Cavite. They speak a dialect of Chavacano with Tagalog as its substrate, just like Caviteño and the extinct Ermiteño. There are an estimated 3,000 speakers of the language at present. The Merdicas (also spelled Mardicas or Mardikas) were Catholic natives of the islands of Ternate and Tidore of the Moluccas, converted during the Portuguese occupation of the islands by Jesuit missionaries. The islands were later captured by the Spanish who vied for their control with the Dutch. In 1663, the Spanish garrison in Ternate were forced to pull out to defend Manila against an impending invasion by the Chinese ruler, Koxinga, from the Kingdom of Tungning in Formosa (Taiwan) (sacrificing the Moluccas to the Dutch in doing so). A number of Merdicas volunteered to help, eventually being resettled in a sandbar near the mouth of the Maragondon river (known as the Bahra de Maragondon) and Tanza, Cavite. The Merdicas community eventually integrated into the local population. Today, the place is called Ternate after the island of Ternate in the Moluccas, and the descendants of the Merdicas continue to use their Spanish creole (with Portuguese and Papuan influence) which came to be known as Ternateño Chabacano.

==== Bicolano ====
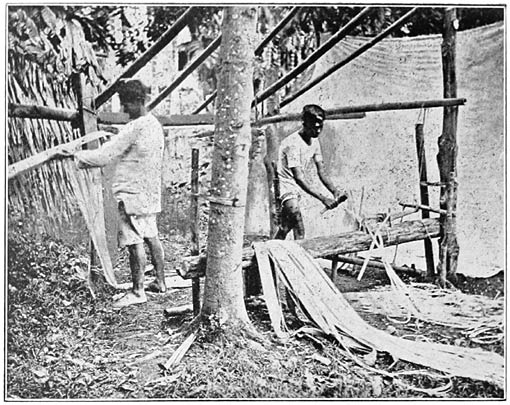
Bicolanos preparing hemp, c. 1900

The Bicolanos are a predominantly Roman Catholic ethnic group that originates from the Bicol Region in Southern Luzon. They are the fifth-largest ethnolinguistic group in the Philippines. There are several Bikol languages of which there is a total of about 3.5 million speakers. The most widespread Bikol language is Central Bikol comprising Naga, Legazpi, Daet and Partido dialects (Virac is sometimes considered as a separate language). They are known for their cuisine heavily using chili peppers and coconut milk. Bicolanos have a high percentage of Spanish introgression with a government sponsored study showing 2 out of 10 Bicolanos being of Spanish descent.

==== Masbateño ====
Masbateños live in Masbate province of the Philippines. Masbate is part of the Bicol Region. They number about more than 623,000. Masbateños may be considered Visayans by language but are Bicolanos by region. They speak the Masbateño language and almost all practice Roman Catholicism. The Masbateño language is closely related to Hiligaynon and Capiznon. However, in various municipalities of the island, various other languages are spoken. In the vicinity of the towns of Cataingan, Palanas and Dimasalang, most residents speak Waray-Waray. In Pio Corpuz the people speak Cebuano, while in Placer and in the west coast along coast of Mandaon, Hiligaynon (Ilonggo) and Capiznon are spoken. Bicolano is also spoken by the residents.

=== Groups in the Mimaropa Region ===
Lowland Christianized groups of the region of Mimaropa, consisting of the islands or provinces of Mindoro, Marinduque, Romblon, Palawan, and other surrounding islands. They also speak Tagalog as their second language because of arrival of Tagalog settlers from South Luzon.

==== Bantoanon ====
The Bantoanon or "people from Banton (Island)" actually reside mostly in Odiongan, Corcuera, Calatrava, and Concepcion in Romblon, an archipelagic province in the Mimaropa region. They speak Asi, also known as Bantoanon, a Visayan language that is lexically similar to the language of Romblomanon. Asi is spoken along with the Romblomanon and Inonhan languages and is classified under the same level as Cebuano. One way to identify a Bantoanon is through his or her family name, which usually starts with the letter "f". Bantoanons value education, as most of them consider it a way to improve their lives. Their usual means of livelihood are trade, business, fishing, and agriculture.

==== Inonhan ====
The Inonhan people are found in southern Tablas Island of the Romblon archipelago in the Mimaropa Region, particularly in the municipalities of Santa Fe, Looc, Alcantara, Santa Maria, and San Andres. There are around 85,000 Inonhans, and they speak the Onhan language, a Western Visayan language. It is one of the three distinct languages spoken by the natives of Romblon.

==== Romblomanon ====
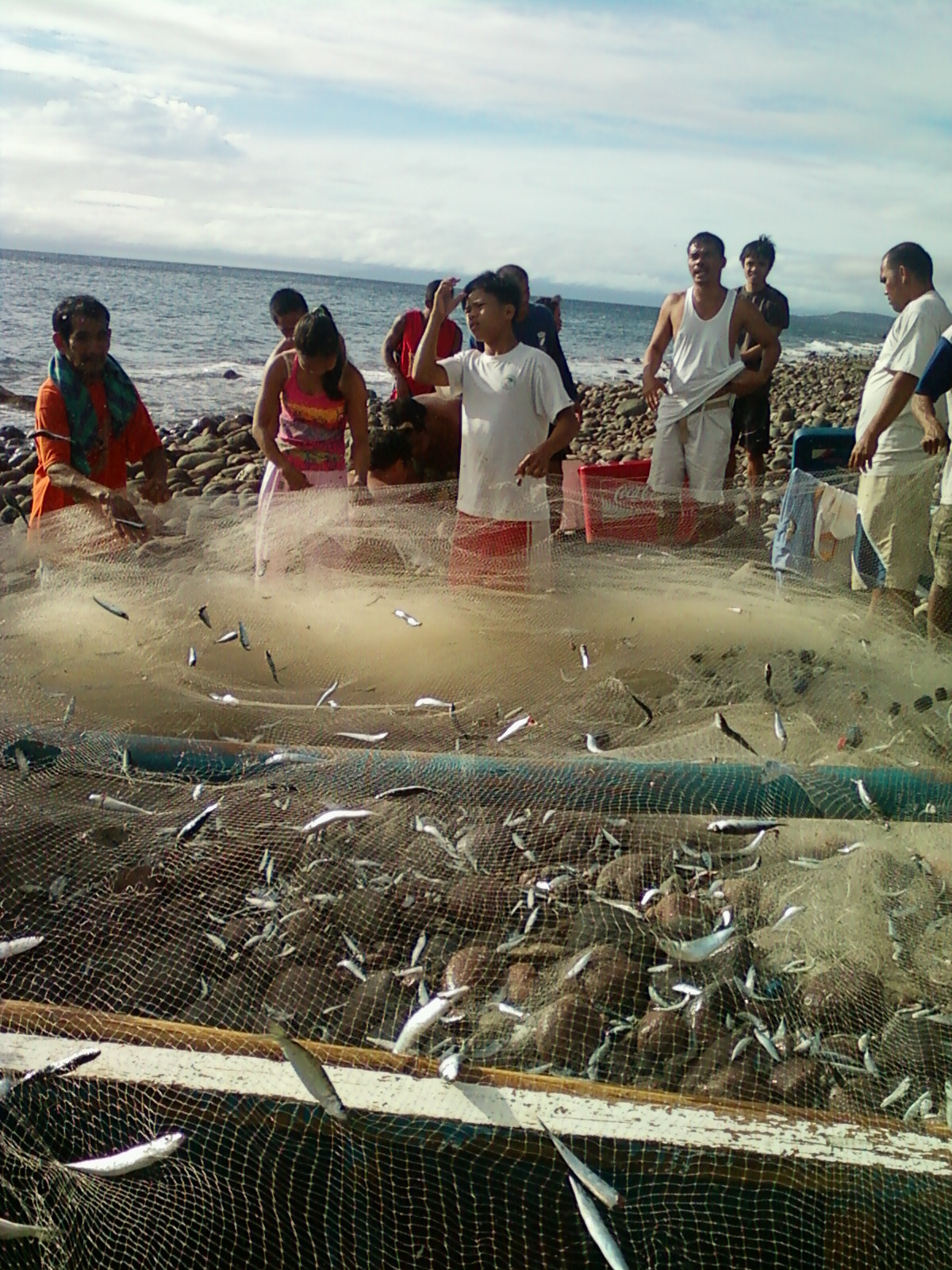
Fisherfolk in Banton, Romblon, 2011

The Romblomanon people are the indigenous inhabitants of Romblon province. However, due to population increase, which the island province's small area could not sustain, there are also significant numbers of Romblomanons in Occidental Mindoro, Oriental Mindoro, Masbate, Aklan, Palawan, Capiz, and possible parts of Luzon and Mindanao. They speak one of three languages, the Romblomanon language, Asi language, and the Onhan language. Most are Roman Catholics. Due to its distance from Capiz and Aklan, most Romblomanons can speak Hiligaynon.

==== Mangyan ====
Mangyan is the generic name for the eight indigenous groups found on the island of Mindoro, around 10% have embraced Christianity, both Catholicism and Evangelical Protestantism (The New Testaments have been published in six of the Mangyan languages).southwest of the island of Luzon in the Philippines, each with its own tribal name, language, and customs. They occupy nearly the whole of the interior of the island of Mindoro. The total population may be around 280,000, but official statistics are difficult to determine under the conditions of remote areas, reclusive tribal groups and some having little if any outside world contact. They also speak Tagalog as their second language because of arrival of Tagalog settlers from Batangas.

==== Iraya ====
The Iraya are Mangyans that live in municipalities in northern Mindoro, such as Paluan, Abra de Ilog, northern Mamburao, and Santa Cruz municipalities in Occidental Mindoro, and Puerto Galera and San Teodoro municipalities in Oriental Mindoro. They have also been found in Calamintao, on the northeastern boundary of Santa Cruz municipality (7 km up the Pagbahan River from the provincial highway). They speak the Iraya language though the younger Iraya Mangyans are slowly becoming more accustomed to using Tagalog and have now mostly discarded their animistic religion in favor of Roman Catholicism, Evangelical Christianism.

==== Alangan ====
The Alangan who are 70 percent christians, are mangyans that primarily live in the municipalities of Naujan and Victoria in Oriental Mindoro, and Sablayan in Occidental Mindoro. They speak the Alangan language and number about 2,150 people around north-central Mindoro. The Ayan Bekeg dialect spoken on the northeast slopes of Mount Halcon is understood by Alangan speakers throughout the area. They may also be found around Casague, Santa Cruz, Occidental Mindoro and Kulasisi (tributary of the Mompong River), near Barrio Arellano, Sablayan, Occidental Mindoro.

==== Tawbuid ====
Contrary to the Eastern Tawbuid, primary religion of Western Tawbuid is christianity. They speak the Western Tawbuid dialect. The Bangon Mangyans also speak the western dialect of Tawbuid. In Occidental Mindoro, Western Tawbuid (also known as Batangan) is spoken by 6,810 people in the municipalities of Sablayan and Calintaan.

==== Buhid ====
The Buhid are mangyans that primarily live in Malfalon, Calintaan, Occidental Mindoro; Bato Eli, Barrio Monte Claro, San José Pandurucan (on the southern bank of the Bugsanga (Bisanga) River) in Occidental Mindoro; Barrio Rambida, Socorro, Oriental Mindoro; and Barrio Batangan, Panaytayan, Mansalay, Oriental Mindoro. They speak the Buhid language in the island of Mindoro, Philippines. In the 1950s, evangelical missionaries introduced Christianity to the Buhid people. The missionaries encouraged the Buhid to move to the flatter areas of Batangan to establish a local congregation. Some Buhid people were receptive to this suggestion and moved to the central region of Batangan.

==== Ratagnon ====
about 10% of Ratagnon have converted to Christianity, Ratagnon (also transliterated Datagnon or Latagnon) are mangyans of the southernmost tip of Occidental Mindoro in the Mindoro Islands along the Sulu Sea. They live in the southernmost part of the municipality of Magsaysay in Occidental Mindoro. The Ratagnon language is similar to the Visayan Cuyunon language, spoken by the inhabitants of Cuyo Island in Northern Palawan.

==== Tribal Palaweño ====
The indigenous peoples of Palawan are a diverse group of both indigenous tribes and lowland groups that historically migrated to the island of Palawan and its outlying islands. These ethnolinguistic groups are widely distributed to the long strip of mainland island literally traversing Luzon, Visayas and Mindanao. Listed below are specifically the tribal groups of Palawan, as opposed to its urban lowland groups that historically settled its cities and towns. Palawan is home to many indigenous peoples whose origins date back thousands of centuries. Pre-historic discoveries reveal how abundant cultural life in Palawan survived before foreign occupiers and colonizers reached the Philippine archipelago. Today, Palawan is making its best to preserve and conserve the richness of its cultural groups. The provincial government strives to support the groups of indigenous peoples of Palawan.

===== Agutaynon =====
Agutaynon are lowland dwellers of Agutaya Island, Palawan that also call themselves as Palaweños, like the Cuyunons, much to the amusement and distress of the original tribal groups, such as the Palawan, who are called Palawano by outsiders. The Agutayanons practice a simpler island lifestyle, with fishing and farming as their main source of livelihood. They speak the Agutaynen language which is spoken by about 15,000 people on Agutaya Island and six of the smaller Cuyo Islands, namely Diit, Maracañao, Matarawis, Algeciras, Concepcion, and Quiniluban. After World War II, Agutaynen speakers were also moved to San Vicente, Roxas, Brooke's Point, Balabac, Linapacan, and Puerto Princesa City on Palawan Island.

===== Kagayanen =====
The Kagayanen are from the municipality of Cagayancillo, Palawan province. There are about 36,000 Kagayanen in the Philippines. They speak the Kagayanen language, which belongs to the Manobo languages found mostly in Mindanao. They can also be found in coastal communities across Palawan, and around Balabac, Busuanga, Coron, and other areas around the Philippines, such as Iloilo Province; Silay, Negros Occidental; Manila; Quezon and Rizal areas. Some can also speak in Hiligaynon, Filipino (Tagalog), Cuyonon, Kinaray-a, Cebuano, or English.

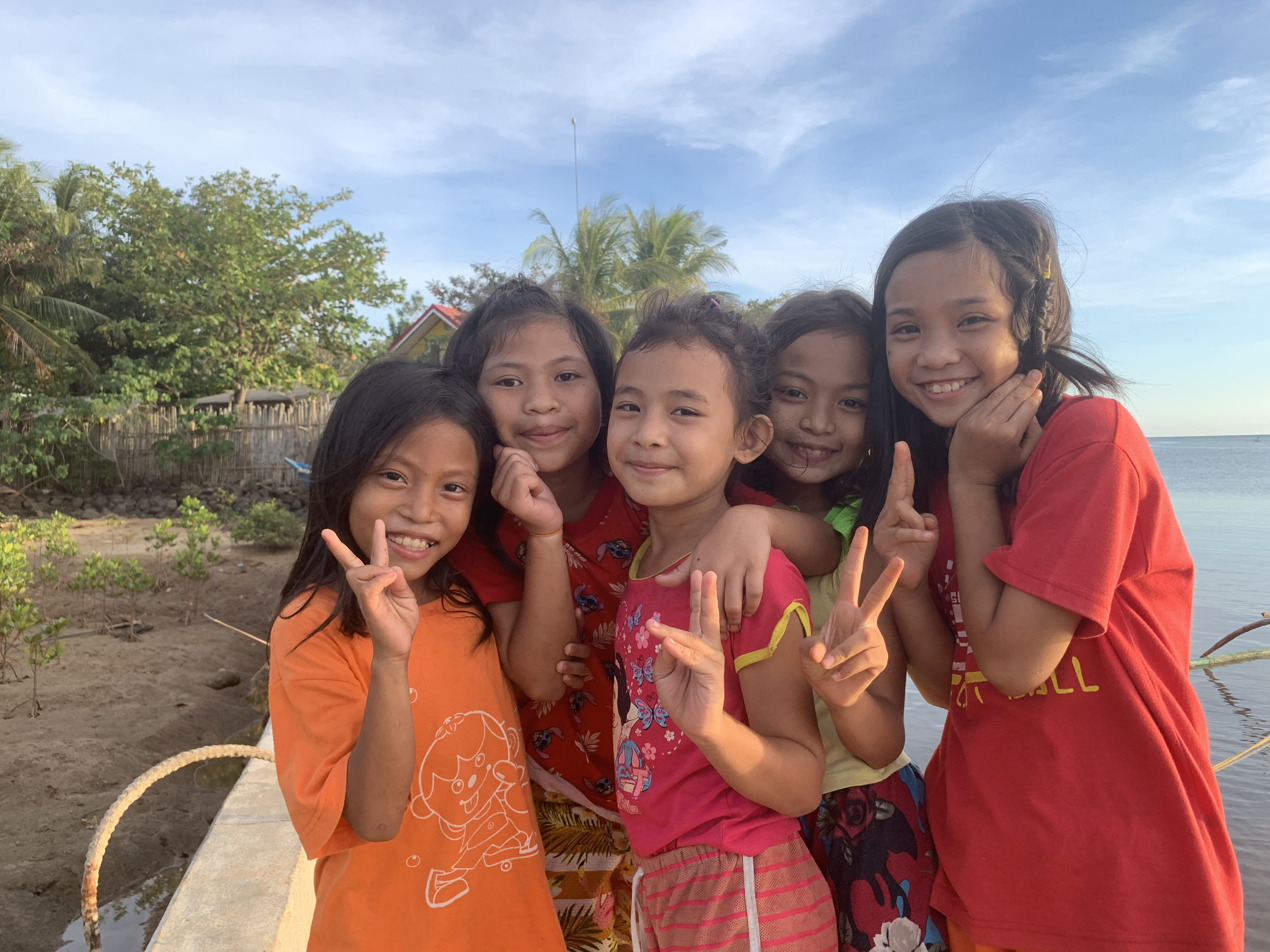
Cuyonon kids in Palawan

===== Cuyunon =====
Cuyunon are lowland dwellers hailing originally from the island town of Cuyo and other surrounding islands. They claim descent from the Kadatuan of Taytay and have historically spread to northern and central Palawan. They also call themselves as Palaweños, like the Agutaynon, much to the amusement and distress of the original tribal groups, such as the Palawan, who are called Palawano by outsiders. They are considered an elite class among the hierarchy of native Palaweños. Their conversion to Christianity has led to the merger of the animistic beliefs of the Cuyunon with the Christian elements to produce a folk Christianity which is the prevailing belief of the Cuyunon. They speak the Cuyonon language, which is a Visayan language, but have recently also adopted Tagalog and Hiligaynon due to an increase of Tagalog-speaking migrants from Luzon and ethnic Hiligaynons from Panay

===== Palawano =====
The Palawan tribal people, 40.00% christian, are an indigenous ethnic group of the Palawan group of islands in the Philippines. They traditionally hunt using soars and bamboo blowguns. They speak the Palawano language, which is divided into four ethno-linguistic subgroupings: the Quezon Palawano which is also known as the Central Palawano; the Bugsuk Palawano or South Palawano; Brooke's Point Palawano; and Southwest Palawano. Palawanos are more popularly known as Palawans, which is pronounced faster than the name of the province. The Quezon Palawano subgroup are found in Southern Palawan, particularly on the western section of the municipality of Quezon including the eastern part of Abo-abo of the municipality of Sofronio Española, going southward down to the northern section of the municipality of Rizal. A large group of Palawans can also be found in Sitios Gugnan, Kambing, Tugpa, and Kalatabog of Barangay Panitian. The Taw't Bato of the municipality of Rizal at the foot of Mt. Matalingahan also belongs to this same Palawan tribal group although their language is 15 percent different from the Quezon Palawanos. The Palawano closely resemble the Tagbanwa, and in the past, they were doubtless the same people. Some Tausug residents in Palawan call the Palawano Traan, which means "people in scattered places". Like the Yakan of Basilan, the Palawano live in houses out of sight of each other, scattered among their plots of farm lands. Their main occupation is subsistence farming, cultivating mainly upland rice. A number of them are Protestant due to recent missionary campaigns.

=== Groups in the Visayas ===
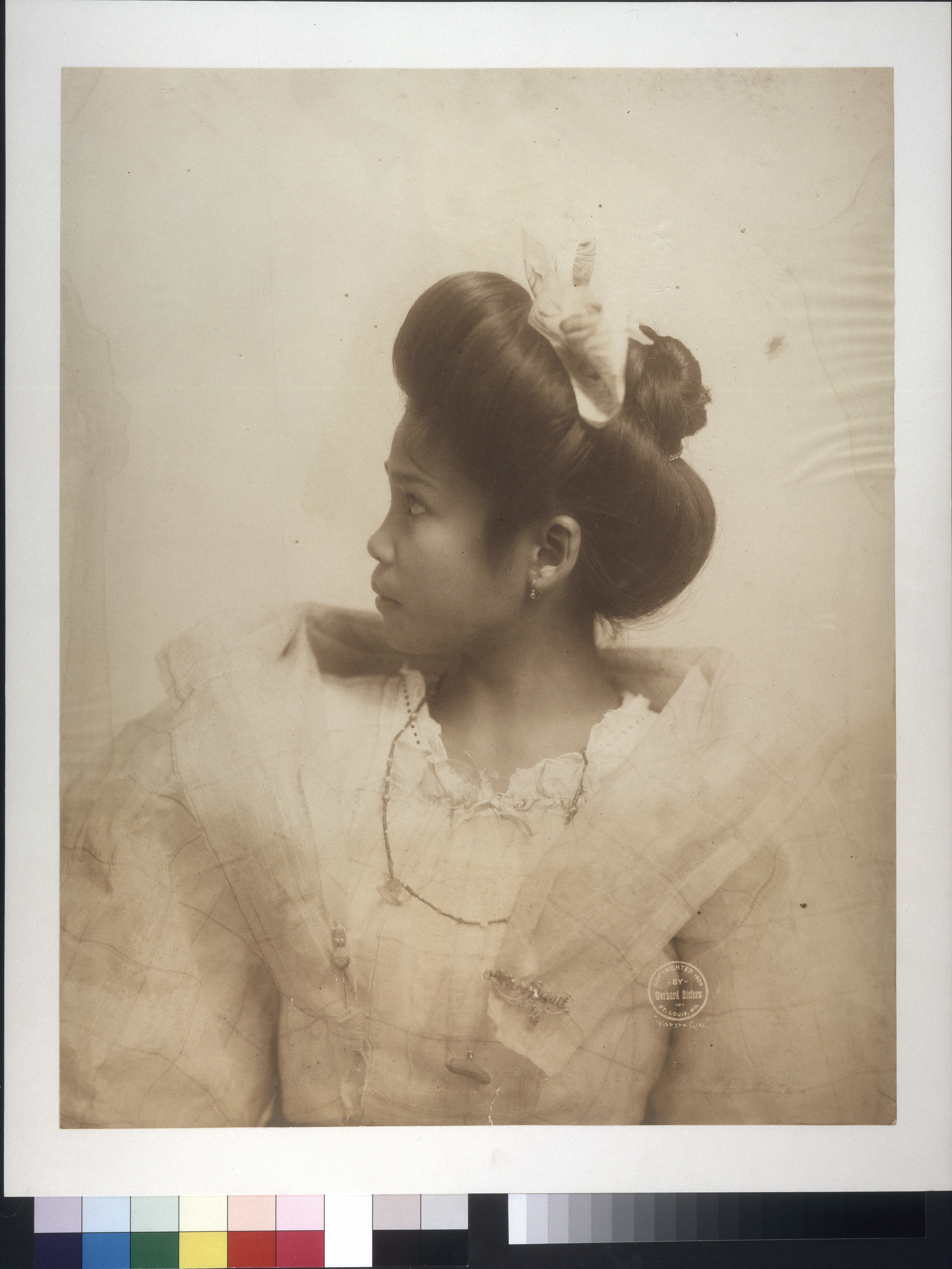
A Visayan woman in 1904

Lowland Christianized groups of the Visayas archipelago. The Visayans are a metaethnicity race native to the whole Visayas, to the southernmost islands of Luzon and the northern and eastern coastal parts of Mindanao. They are speakers of one or more Visayan languages, the most widely spoken being Cebuano, Hiligaynon and Waray-Waray. Other groups speak smaller languages such as Aklanon, Boholano, Butuanon, Capiznon, Eskaya, Kinaray-a, Masbateño, Porohanon, Romblomanon, and Surigaonon. If speakers of the Visayan languages are to be grouped together, they would comprise the largest ethnic group in the nation, numbering at around 33 million as of 2010.

==== Abaknon ====
The Abaknon (Capul Samal, Capuleño) live on the island of Capul on the northern tip of Samar in the San Bernardino Straits, south of the province of Sorsogon. Although set across Central Philippines from the Sulu and Tawi-Tawi archipelagoes where the Sama groups live, the Abaknon speak the Inabaknon language, also known as Abaknon, Abaknon Sama, Capuleño, Kapul, or Capul Sinama, that is related to the Sama language, and not to the languages of the peoples around them like the Bikol and Waray languages, the latter is the Abaknon speak as second language. The largest concentrations of this population are in northern Samar (8,840), and in Capul (8,735) with a total population of some 9,870 (NSO 1980). The orientation of the people is marine with the basic industry focused on fishing, with set rice farming toward the interior. The communities are highly acculturated and practically indistinguishable from the surrounding communities of mainstream ethnic groups.

==== Waray ====
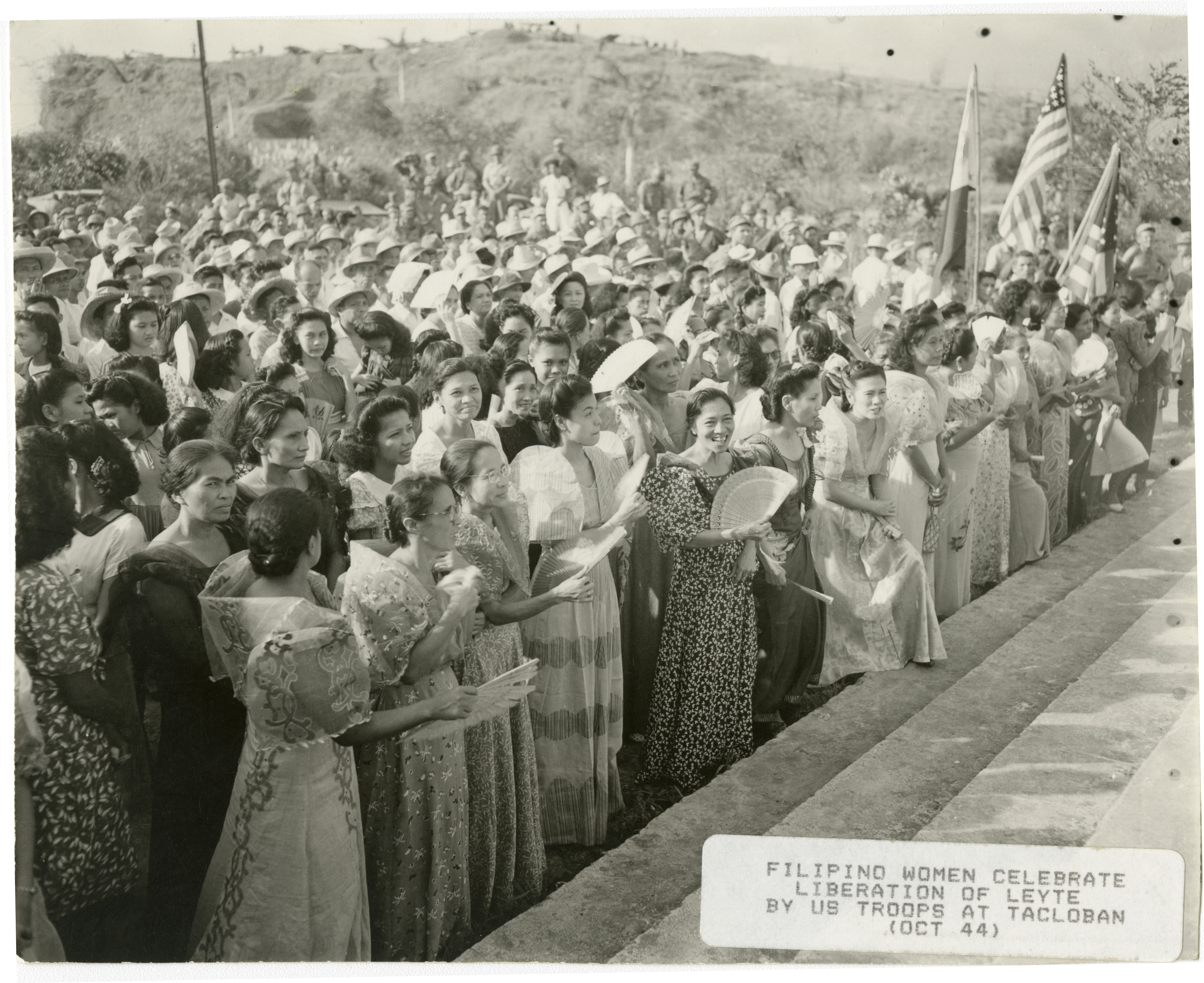
Waray people of Tacloban celebrating liberation of Leyte

The Waray people refers to the group of people whose primary language is the Waray language (also called Lineyte-Samarnon). They are native to the islands of Samar, Leyte and Biliran, which together comprise the Eastern Visayas Region of the Philippines. Waray people inhabit the whole island of Samar where they are called Samarnons, the northern part of the island of Leyte where they are called Leytenyos, and the island of Biliran. On Leyte island, the Waray people occupy the northern part of the island, separated from the Cebuano language-speaking Leyteños by a mountain range in the middle of the island. On the island of Biliran, Waray-Waray-speaking people live on the eastern part of the island facing the island of Samar; their Waray-Waray dialect is commonly referred to as Biliranon. On the island of Ticao, which belongs to the province of Masbate in the Bicol Region, Waray-Waray-speaking people live on most parts of the island; they are commonly referred to as Ticaonon. However, the Ticaonon have more affinity with the Masbateño-speaking people of Masbate, being their province-mates. The Bicolano language has more common vocabulary with the Waray-Waray language than with other Visayan languages (i.e. Cebuano or Ilonggo). They are historically known to be part of the Pintados people of the Visayas encountered by the Spanish and were regarded to have an established pre-Hispanic maritime militia. They are known to have cuisine with coconut milk and meat and have a slightly sweeter palette than Visayan neighbors. Animism is still a noticeable culture among the Warays and are usually practice based and alongside dominant religions.

==== Caluyanon ====
The Caluyanon people are found on the Caluya Islands of Antique Province in the Western Visayas Region. They speak the Caluyanon language, but many speakers use either Kiniray-a or Hiligaynon as their second language. According to a recent survey, around 30,000 people speak Caluyanon.

==== Aklanon ====
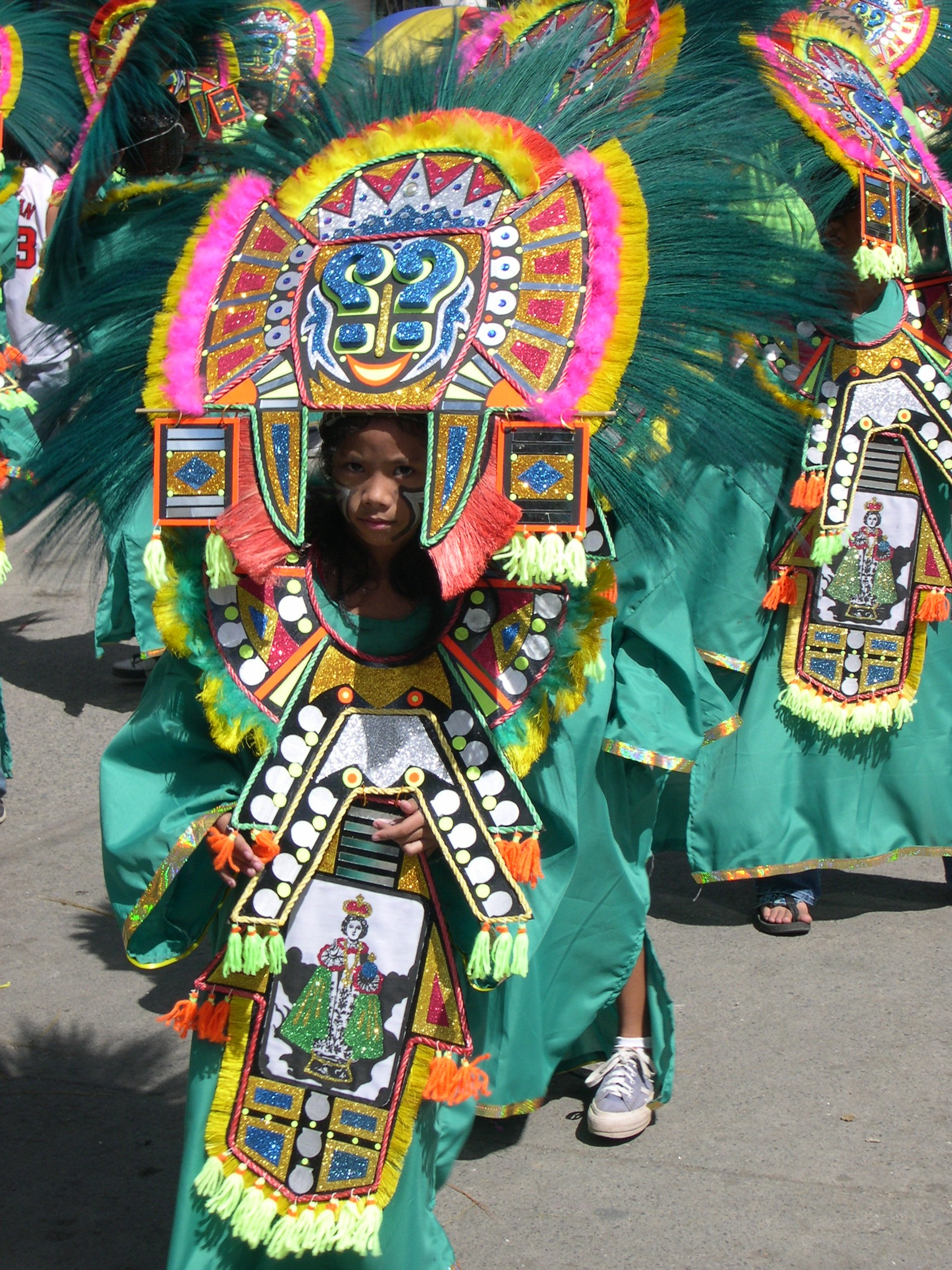
2007 Ati-Atihan festival in Kalibo, Aklan

Aklanon form the majority in the province of Aklan in Panay. They are also found in other Panay provinces such as Iloilo, Antique, and Capiz, as well as Romblon. Like the other Visayans, Aklanons have also found their way to Metro Manila, Mindanao, and even the United States. Aklanons number about 500,000. They are culturally close to the Karay-a and Hiligaynons. This similarity has been shown by customs, traditions, and language. Aklanons speak the Aklan languages, which includes Aklanon and Malaynon. Ati and Kinaray-a are also spoken to some extent. Meanwhile, Hiligaynon is used as a regional language. Aklanon and Hiligaynon are spoken by Aklanons in Metro Manila, while the official languages of the Philippines, Filipino and English are taught at school.

==== Capiznon ====
The Capiznons or Capizeños refer to the people who are native to or have roots in Roxas City and the province of Capiz, located in the region of Western Visayas in the central section of the Philippines. located in the region of Western Visayas in the central section of the Philippines. It is located at the northeastern portion of Panay Island. They speak the Capiznon language, which is often confused with Hiligaynon due to dialectological comprehension similarities and as high as 91% mutual intelligibility, but it has its certain unique accent and vocabulary that integrates Aklanon and Waray lexicon.

==== Karay-a ====
The Karay-a people speak the Karay-a language, also known as Kinaray-a. The name of this group was derived from the word iraya, which means "upstream". The Karay-a number about 363,000. Meanwhile, Hiligaynon, Tagalog, and English are used as second languages. Most are Christians. About half are Roman Catholics, and the remaining half are Protestants. Some people belonging to the Suludnon tribe, are animists. As of 2015, there are about 1,300,000 Karay-a speakers all over the country. About 45% from Antique, 38% from Iloilo and 7% in Mindanao specifically Sultan Kudarat and Cotabato.

==== Hiligaynon ====
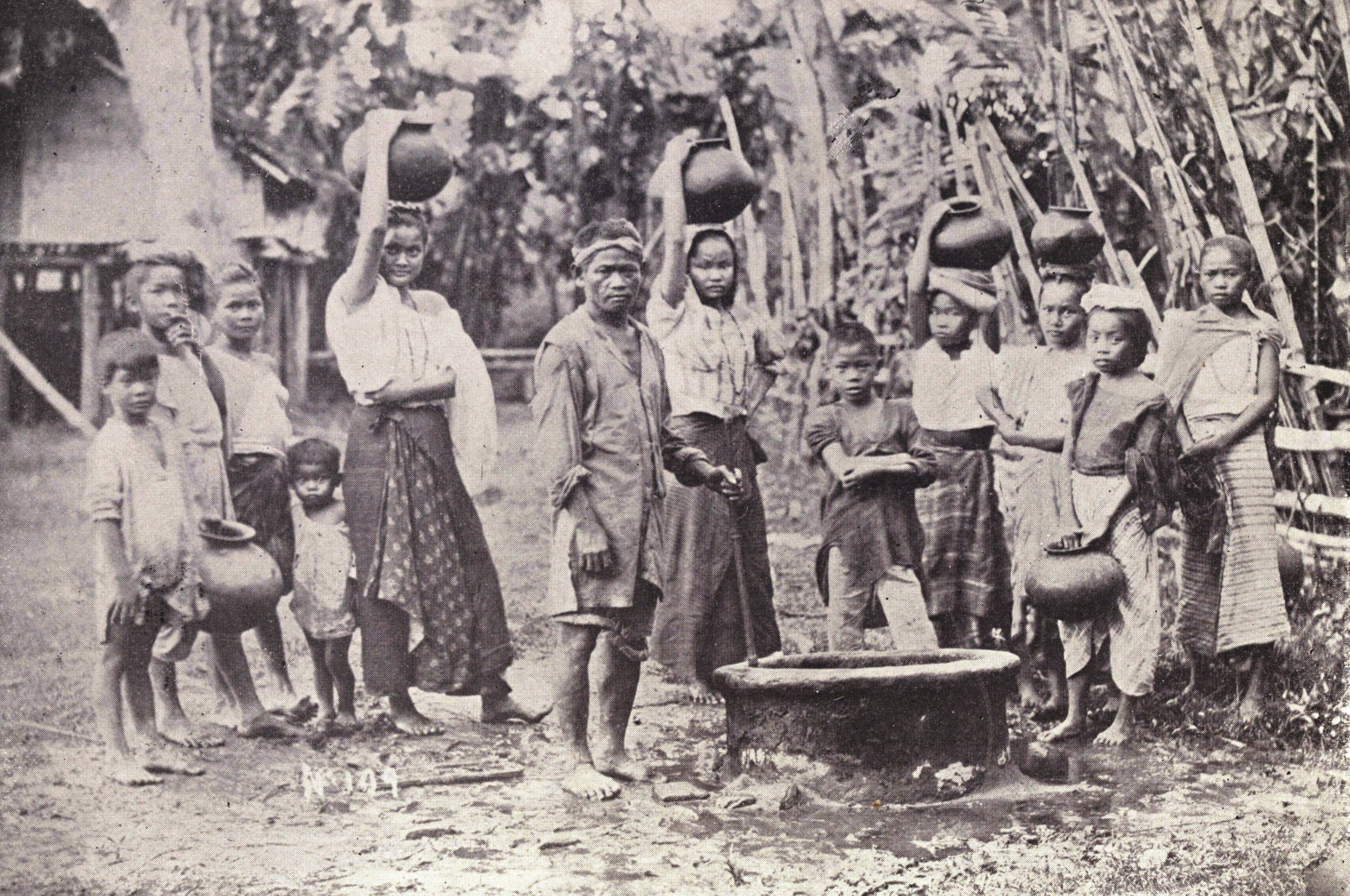
Native water carriers in Iloilo, circa pre-1899

The Hiligaynon people, often referred to as Ilonggo people (Hiligaynon: Mga Hiligaynon/Mga Ilonggo), refers to the ethnic race whose primary language is the Hiligaynon language, an Austronesian language native to Panay, Guimaras, and Negros Occidental. Other Hiligaynons lived in Romblon, southern Mindoro, Palawan, Masbate and Soccsksargen. Over the years, inter-migrations and intra-migrations have contributed to the diaspora of the Hiligaynons to different parts of the Philippines. Now, the Hiligaynon form the majority in the provinces of Iloilo, Negros Occidental, Guimaras, Capiz, South Cotabato, Sultan Kudarat, and Cotabato. Hiligaynons also tend to speak and understand other languages within the environment they settled and grew up such as Cebuano (a related Visayan language spoken within the borders of Cebuano-speaking provinces of Negros Oriental, Bukidnon, Davao del Sur and Davao Occidental in Visayas and Mindanao respectively that has 80% mutual intelligibility with Hiligaynon), Ilocano, Maguindanaon and other languages native in Soccsksargen such as T'boli, Blaan and Teduray.

==== Magahat ====
The Magahat are also known as the Ati-Man and Bukidnon. There are concentrations of Magahat found in southwestern Negros, Santa Catalina, Bayawan, and Siaton in Negros Oriental; and in Negros Occidental. They speak the Magahat language (also called Southern Binukidnon), which is a mixture of Hiligaynon and Cebuano. The Magahat practice swidden agriculture, because their settlements are in mountainous areas. They are food gatherers and good hunters as well.

==== Porohanon ====
Porohanon are the people of Poro Island in the Camotes Islands, Cebu in the Philippines. They are part of the Visayan metaethnicity. They speak the Porohanon language, and Cebuano as their second language. Interestingly, though, the Porohanon language has few similarities with Cebuano. It is closer to Masbateño and the Hiligaynon languages.

==== Cebuano ====
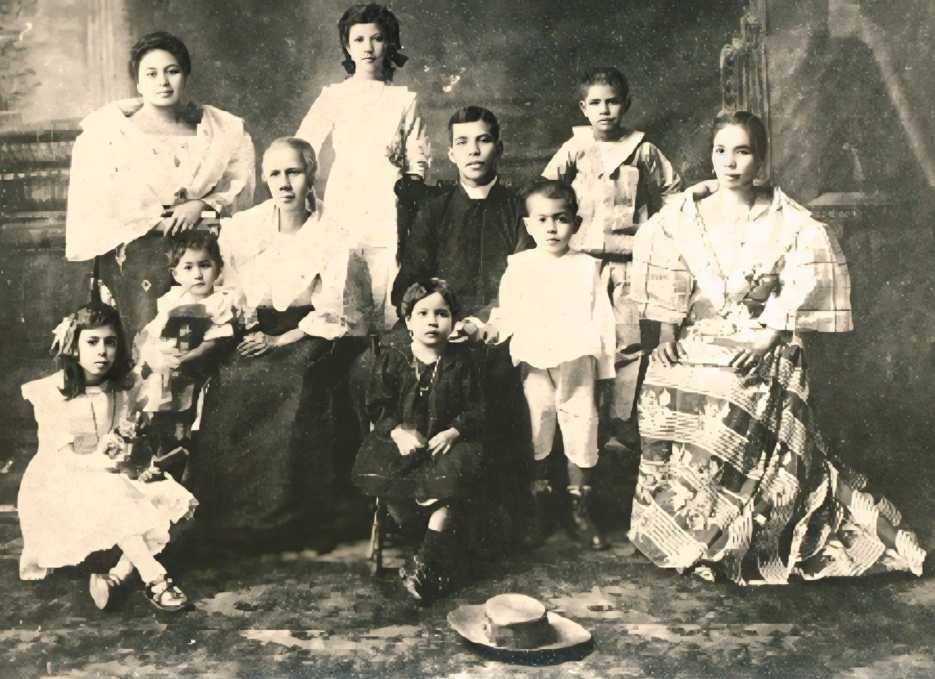
A Cebuano Family circa late 1800's - 1900's

The Cebuano people (Cebuano: Mga Sugbuanon) are the second most widespread ethnic group in the Philippines after the Tagalog people. They are originally native to the province of Cebu in the region of Central Visayas whose primary language is the Cebuano language and later spread out to other places in the Philippines, such as Siquijor, Bohol, Negros Oriental, southwestern Leyte, western Samar, Masbate, and large parts of Mindanao. The majority of Cebuanos are Roman Catholic. Despite being one of the majority ethnicities in Mindanao as well as southwestern Leyte, western Samar and Masbate, Cebuanos also tend to speak and understand other languages within the environment they settled and grew up such as Waray, Masbateño, Hiligaynon (a related Visayan language spoken within the borders of Hiligaynon-speaking areas of Negros Occidental and Soccsksargen in Visayas and Mindanao respectively that has 80% mutual intelligibility with Cebuano), and other languages native in Mindanao such as various Lumad languages, Zamboanga Chavacano, Maranao, Maguindanaon, Iranun, Tausug, Butuanon and Surigaonon with the latter three being related to Visayan languages.

==== Boholano ====
The Boholano people, also called Bol-anon, refers to the people who live in the island province of Bohol. They speak the Boholano dialect of Cebuano Bisaya, which is a Visayan speech variety, although it is sometimes described as a separate language by some linguists and native speakers. The population of Bohol is 1,137,268 according to the 2000 census. Some also live in Southern Leyte and Mindanao (mainly in the northeastern portion). The majority of the population is Roman Catholic adherents or other Christian denominations. Others practices traditional indigenous religions.

==== Eskaya ====
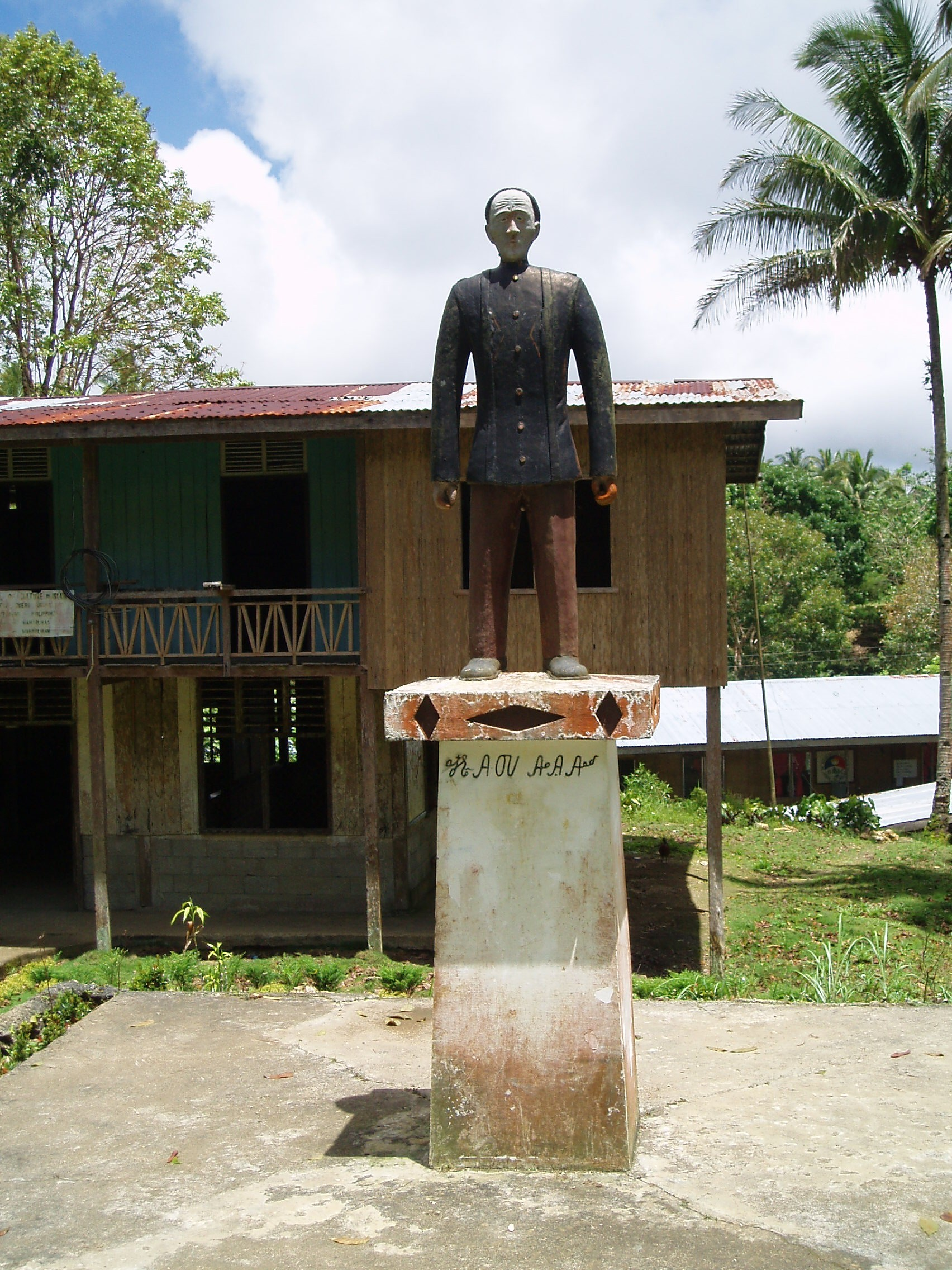
Mariano Datahan statue outside the Eskaya cultural school in Duero, Bohol

The Eskaya, less commonly known as the Visayan-Eskaya, are the members of a cultural minority found in Bohol, Philippines, which is distinguished by its cultural heritage, particularly its literature, language, dress and religious observances. The unique Eskayan language and writing system in particular has been a source of fascination and controversy. Today, the Eskaya are officially classified as an Indigenous Cultural Community under The Indigenous Peoples Rights Act of 1997 (Republic Act No. 8371).

=== Groups in Mindanao ===
Lowland Christianized groups of the island of Mindanao.

==== Surigaonon ====
Surigaonons populate the eastern coastal plain of Mindanao, particularly the provinces of Surigao del Norte, Surigao del Sur and Dinagat Islands. They are also present in the provinces of Agusan del Norte, Agusan del Sur, and in Davao Oriental. They speak the Surigaonon language which closely resembles Cebuano, albeit with some local words and phrases. Because of the mass influx of Cebuano settlers to Mindanao, they also speak Cebuano as second language since Surigaonon is a Visayan language, other languages are Tagalog, and English as third languages. The vast majority of Surigaonons are Roman Catholics, very few are Muslims in contrast to its very closely related Tausug brothers which are predominantly Muslims.

==== Kamiguin ====
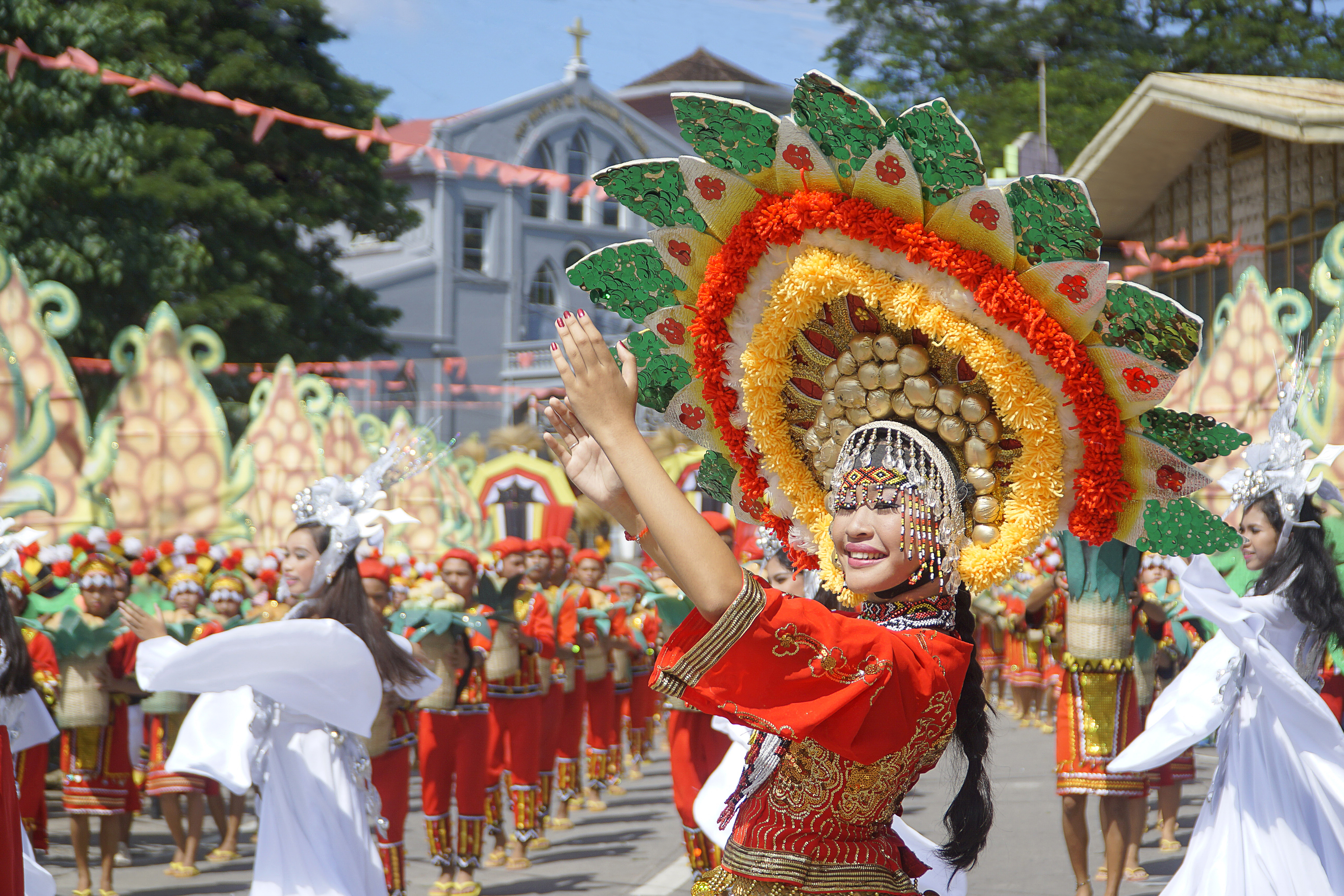
Lanzones festival in Mambajao, Camiguin

The Kamiguin/Kamigin people inhabit the oldest town of the island of Camiguin—Guinsiliban—just off the northern coast of Mindanao. They spoke the Kamigin/Kinamigin language (Quinamiguin, Camiguinon) that is derived from Manobo with an admixture of Boholano. Sagay is the only other municipality where this is spoken. The total population is 531 (NSO 1990). Boholano predominates in the rest of the island. The culture of the Kamiguin has been subsumed within the context of Boholano or Visayan culture. The people were Christianized as early as 1596. The major agricultural products are abaca, cacao, coffee, banana, rice, corn, and coconut. The production of hemp is the major industry of the people since abaca thrives very well in the volcanic soil of the island. The plant was introduced in Bagacay, a northern town of Mindanao, but it is no longer planted there. Small-scale trade carried out with adjoining islands like Cebu, Bohol, and Mindanao. Nowadays, the language is declining as most inhabitants have shifted to Cebuano.

==== Butuanon ====
The Butuanon are an ethnic group descended from Visayans. As with the Surigaonons, the Butuanons are also previously considered as Cebuanos. They live in the provinces of Agusan del Norte and Agusan del Sur. Some live in Misamis Oriental or in Surigao del Norte, all of which are in the northeastern corner of Mindanao. They number about 1,420,000 and speak the Butuanon language, but most Butuanon nowadays primarily speak the Cebuano language, because of the mass influx of Cebuano settlers to Mindanao, and Filipino, English as second languages. Most are Roman Catholics, while some are Protestants.

==== Zamboangueño ====
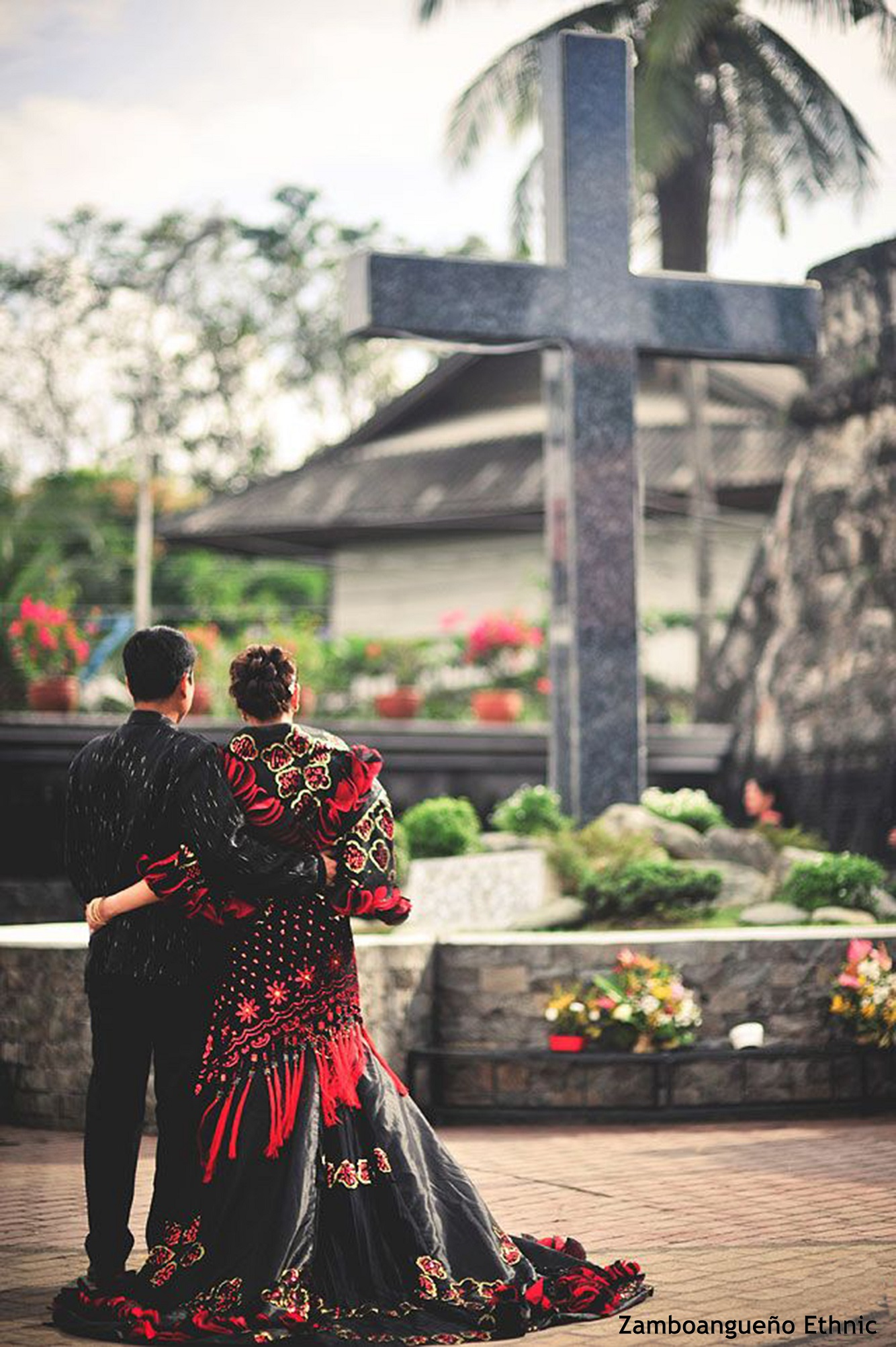
Zamboangueño

The Zamboangueño people (Chavacano/Spanish: Pueblo Zamboangueño) are a creole ethnic group of mixed Spanish and native Austronesian descent that mostly speak Chavacano, a Spanish-based creole. They originate from the Zamboanga Peninsula, especially in Zamboanga City. Spanish censuses record that as much as one third of the inhabitants of the city of Zamboanga possess varying degrees of Spanish and Hispano-American admixture. The Zamboangueño constitute an authentic and distinct ethnic identity because of their coherent cultural and historical heritage, most notably the Old Castilian-based creole language "Chavacano" language, that distinguishes them from neighbouring ethnic groups. The region historically received immigrants from Mexico and Peru. Chavacanos are the Philippine native ethnic group which holds the most Spanish descent, a government sponsored genetic study discovered that 4 out of 10 Chavacanos or 40% of the population, are in fact Spanish in descent.

==== Cotabateño ====
Cotabateños live in Cotabato, Mindanao. They speak the Cotabateño dialect of Chavacano, just like Zamboangueño and Chavacano Davaoeño, which are recognized as the Mindanao-based Spanish creoles, with Cebuano as their substrate language. Cotabateño is a derivative of the extinct Zamboangueño dialect of Chavacano due to the large shared vocabulary derived from Hiligaynon, a Central Visayan language. The ancestors of the present Zamboangueño-speaking population were in contact with the Hiligaynons at the time of the creole's formation. Cotabateño has also borrowed words from the Maguindanao and Tiruray languages.

=== Historical foreign migrants and intermixed peoples ===
The Philippines consists of a wide number of settlers that form part of the national population. They historically immigrated or descended from various countries or lands throughout the history of the Philippines, from as early as the precolonial period, the Spanish colonial period, the American colonial period, Japanese occupation, and modern era. Historically in the context of modern countries, they most notably came from Spain, Mexico, China, the United States, Japan, and India. Much of these immigrant peoples throughout the centuries eventually integrated or assimilated into the country's population, producing new groups of intermixed people that many identify as part of their Filipino identity.

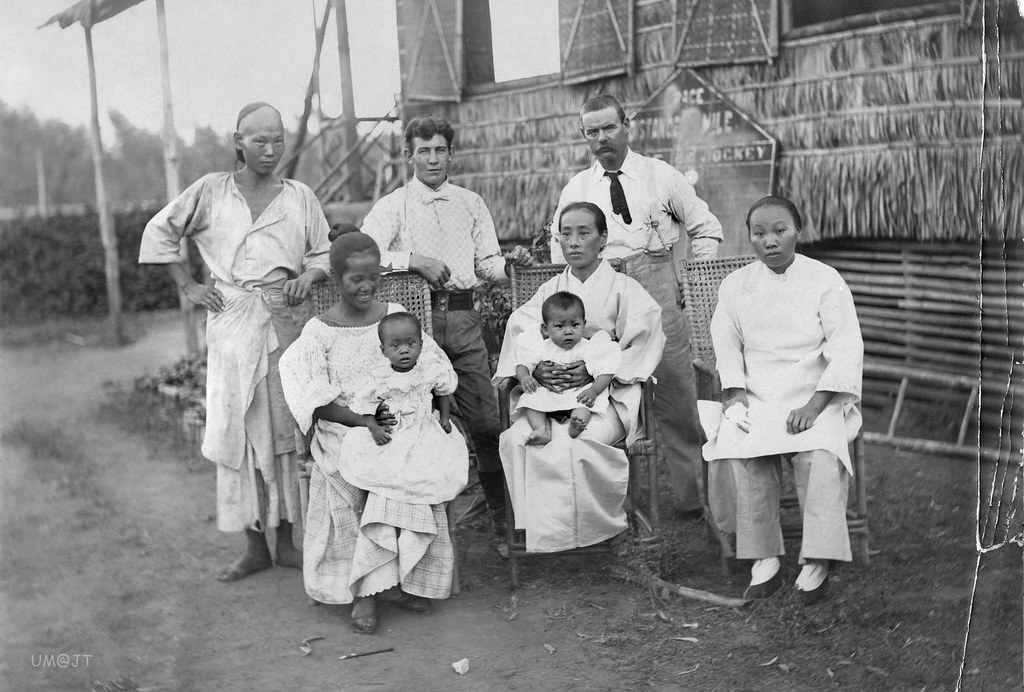
A native Filipina with Chinese, European and Japanese settlers in the Philippines, 1900

Across the Philippines for the past centuries especially since the Spanish Colonial Era, the main historical migrant heritage groups are also the Chinese Filipinos and Spanish Filipinos who in Spanish Colonial Times later intermixed with the above lowland native Filipino ethnic groups, which produced the Mestizo de Sangley (Chinese Mestizo) and Mestizo de Español (Spanish Mestizo) respectively. A Spanish groups known as Insulares or Criollos are so integrated to the lowlanders that they identified with this culture calling themselves Los hijos del país (lit. "sons of the country") and identifying the Philippines as their motherland. One eye witness of this integration was an English engineer, Frederic H. Sawyer, who had spent most of his life in different parts of Asia and lived in Luzon for fourteen years quoted.

... Spaniards and natives lived together in great harmony, and do not know where I could find a colony in which Europeans mixes as much socially with the natives. Not in Java, where a native of position must dismount to salute the humblest Dutchman. Not in British India, where the Englishwoman has now made the gulf between British and native into a bottomless pit.

Sir John Bowring, Governor General of British Hong Kong who is also a witnessed to this phenomenon in the Philippines concluded:

"...There is no doubt that having one Religion forms great bonding. And more so to the eyes of one that has been observing the repulsion and differences due to race in many parts of Asia.

There was also the mix of Tornatrás during the Spanish Colonial Era, who were either the mix of both the Spanish and Chinese (Sangley) in Spanish Colonial Philippines or the mix of the Chinese mestizo and Spanish mestizo, resulting in carrying all three ancestries from Spanish, Chinese, and native Filipino ancestry. Historically though, it was the Mestizo de Sangley (Chinese Mestizo) that numbered the most among mestizos. Many Filipinos today associate the term "mestizo" with Spanish mestizos. Most descendants of the Mestizo de Sangley (Chinese Mestizo), despite assuming many of the important roles in the economic, social, and political life of the nation, also later readily assimilated into the fabric of Philippine society.

These groups are the historical foreign migrant peoples and the intermixed peoples they produced with the lowland peoples of the Philippines.

==== Spanish Filipino ====
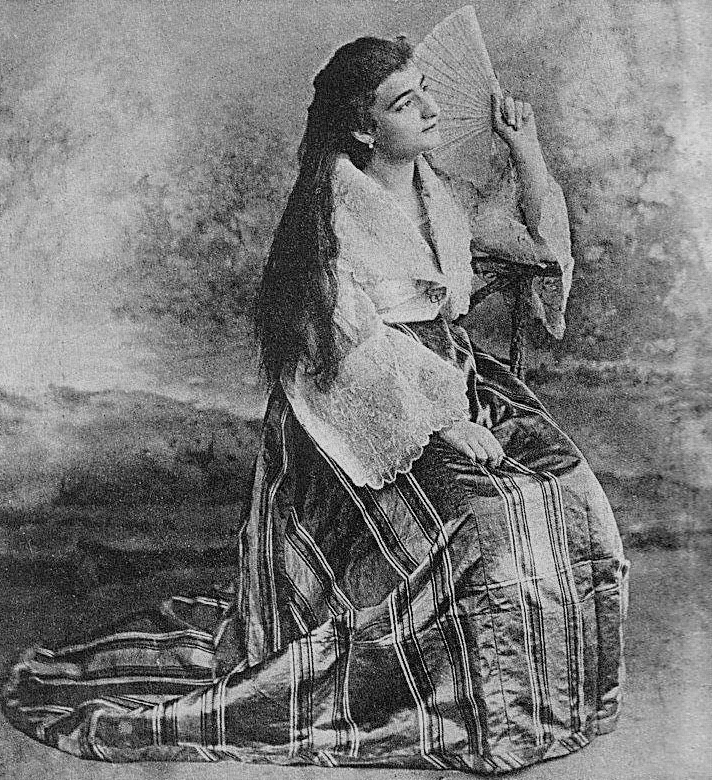
A Filipino woman wearing the Maria Clara gown, 1900

Spanish Filipinos (Español/Espanyol/Kastila/Tisoy/Conyo) are any citizen or resident of the Philippines who is of pure or mostly Spanish origin. While there are Spanish Filipinos of Andalusian and Catalan descent, majority of the Filipinos of Spanish descent are of Basque descent. Historically, they first settled in the Philippines, as soon as, Spanish colonization commenced in the disunited archipelago of the time. They have historically composed the ruling upper class of the Spanish colonial era and their legacy includes the Mestizos de Español and Tornatrás, which combined with them, are represented in all levels of Philippine society and are integrated politically and economically, in the private and government sector. In the Spanish colonial era, they used to also be classified as either Peninsulares (pure Spanish descent born in Spain or the Iberian Peninsula), Americano (Criollo, Castizo, or Mestizo descent born in Spanish America), or Filipino/Insulares (pure Spanish descent born in the Philippines). Currently, they mostly speak and can code-switch between English and Filipino (Tagalog) or other Philippine languages, just like other Filipinos, but some families can still speak Philippine Spanish, the historical Spanish dialect of the Philippines, mostly as second or third language. They historically brought Philippine Spanish into the Philippines, which is very similar to Mexican Spanish, because of Mexican emigration to the Spanish East Indies (Philippines) over the years. It is spoken mostly among Spanish Filipinos and was the prestige language during the Spanish colonial period. This Spanish dialect went into decline and has largely been taken out of the mainstream languages of the Philippines during the American colonial era, but it has left a large linguistic imprint into most if not all Philippine languages. Some parts of the country with a larger Spanish Filipino influence produced a Spanish-based creole called Chavacano, that is still spoken in Zamboanga, Cavite city, and Ternate. Some of the richest Spanish Filipino families are families that have inherited the fortunes of their family owned companies or conglomerates. According to an 1818 study by the renowned German ethnologist Fëdor Jagor entitled The Former Philippines thru Foreign Eyes, not less than one third of the inhabitants of the island of Luzon were descendants of Spaniards, mixed with varying degrees of South American, Chinese, and Indian ancestry and the vast majority of military personnel then had Pan-American origins. According to the tribute-census in the 1700s, 5% of the population were Spanish-Filipinos.

==== Mexican Filipino ====
Mexican immigration to the Philippines mainly occurred during the Hispanic period. Between 1565-1821, the Philippines were in fact administered from the Viceroyalty of New Spain's capital, Mexico City. During this period trans-Pacific trade brought many Mexicans and Spaniards to the Philippines as sailors, crew, prisoners, slaves, adventurers and soldiers in the Manila-Acapulco Galleons which was the main form of communication between the two Spanish territories. Similarly the route brought various different Filipinos, such as native Filipinos, Spanish Filipinos (Philippine-born Insulares), Chinese Filipinos (See Chinese immigration to Mexico), and other Asian groups to Mexico. According to Stephanie Mawson in her M.Phil thesis entitled Between Loyalty and Disobedience: The Limits of Spanish Domination in the Seventeenth Century Pacific, in the 1600s there were thousands of Latin American settlers sent to the Philippines by the Spaniards per year and around that time frame the Spaniards had cumulatively sent 15,600 settlers from Peru and Mexico while there were only 600 Spaniards from Spain, that supplemented a Philippine population of only 667,612 people. Due to the initial low population count, people of Latin American and Hispanic descent quickly spread across the territory. Several hundred Tlaxcalan soldiers sailed to the islands in the 16th century, with some settling permanently and contributing numerous Nahuatl words to the Filipino languages. It was royal policy to use Peruvian and Mexican soldiers as colonists to the Philippines.

Geographic distribution and year of settlement of the Latin-American immigrant soldiers assigned to the Philippines in the 1600s.
Location	1603	1636	1642	1644	1654	1655	1670	1672
Manila	900	446	—	407	821	799	708	667
Fort Santiago	—	22	—	—	50	—	86	81
Cavite	—	70	—	—	89	—	225	211
Cagayan	46	80	—	—	—	—	155	155
Calamianes	—	—	—	—	—	—	73	73
Caraga	—	45	—	—	—	—	81	81
Cebu	86	50	—	—	—	—	135	135
Formosa	—	180	—	—	—	—	—	—
Moluccas	80	480	507	—	389	—	—	—
Otón	66	50	—	—	—	—	169	169
Zamboanga	—	210	—	—	184	—	—	—
Other	255	—	—	—	—	—	—	—
	—	—	—	—	—	—	—	—
Total Reinforcements	1,533	1,633	2,067	2,085	n/a	n/a	1,632	1,572

The book Intercolonial Intimacies Relinking Latin/o America to the Philippines, 1898–1964 by Paula C. Park cites "Forzados y reclutas: los criollos novohispanos en Asia (1756-1808)" gave a higher number of later Mexican soldier-immigrants to the Philippines, pegging the number at 35,000 immigrants in the 1700s, in a Philippine population which was only around 1.5 Million, thus forming 2.33% of the population.

==== Chinese Filipino ====
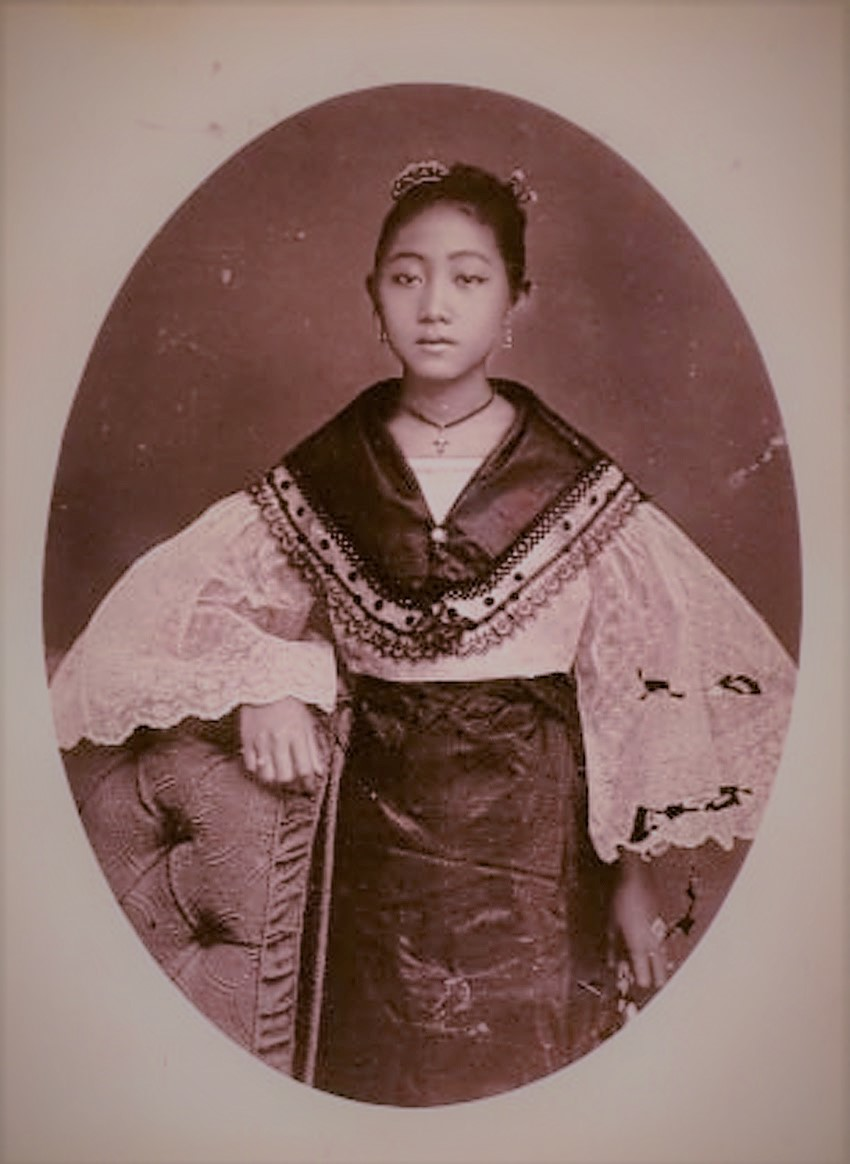
A Chinese Filipino wearing the traditional Maria Clara gown, 1913

Chinese Filipinos (Intsik/Tsinoy/Chinito/Chinita/Pilipinong Tsino/Lannang) are Filipinos of Chinese descent, mostly born and raised in the Philippines. Most migrations of Chinese to the Philippines started even before the Spanish colonial period, when foreign trade with other countries were opened to the Philippines. Ethnic Chinese sailed around the Philippine Islands from the 9th century onward and frequently interacted with the local Filipinos. Some datus, rajahs, and lakans (indigenous rulers) in the Philippines were themselves a product of the intermarriage between the Chinese merchant-settlers and the local Filipinos. Chinese Filipinos are one of the largest overseas Chinese communities in Southeast Asia. There are approximately at least 1.35 million Filipinos or more with Chinese ancestry, which is at least 1.3% of the population. In addition, Mestizos de Sangley—Filipinos with at least some Chinese ancestry—comprise a substantial proportion of the Philippine population, although the actual figures are not known, however there are some statistics published by the Philippine Senate, showing how 20% of the population was part Chinese. The majority of the Filipinos of Chinese descent are of Hokkien origin, while a small minority are Cantonese or Teochew descents. Chinese Filipinos of Hokkien descent mostly trace roots from Fujian province, specifically mostly from Quanzhou and Xiamen and to a lesser extent from Zhangzhou, thus the Philippine Hokkien dialect mostly takes from the Quanzhou dialect with influences from the Xiamen (Amoy) dialect and the Zhangzhou dialect. Some Hokkien Chinese Filipinos before moving to the Philippines also initially moved from Hong Kong, despite originally being from Fujian province, thus many carry family names spelled in the Cantonese style despite being Hokkien themselves. Meanwhile, the Chinese Filipinos of Cantonese descent mostly trace roots from Guangdong province, specifically Taishan, Guangzhou, and Macau, thus many speak the Taishanese or mainstream Cantonese. Lastly, Chinese Filipinos of Teochew descent are a rare minority, where not much is known about them except that they are frequently confused with those of Hokkien ancestry but may instead have Teochew as heritage language. Historically, the Chinese have been trading and settling with the peoples of the Philippines even during the precolonial era, ever since the Tang dynasty era in China, but it was during the first few centuries of the early Spanish colonial period, when they settled in larger numbers. In Spanish colonial times, Chinese immigrants used to be called "Sangley" which in Hokkien means "business", but centuries later, they eventually intermixed with natives and Spanish Filipinos, producing Mestizo de Sangley and Tornatrás Filipinos. Over the centuries, generations have both been gradually assimilated and replenished from occasional fresh immigration from family or village contacts in their Hokkien home province of Fujian in China or Taiwan, so they are still well represented in all levels of Filipino society, while leaving many historical contributions to Philippine society. Many Chinese Filipinos also play an important role in the Philippine business sector. Many of the richest families in the country are from Chinese Filipino families that run big conglomerate companies. Currently, they mostly speak and can code-switch between English and Filipino (Tagalog) or other Philippine languages, just like other Filipinos, but some families can still speak Philippine Hokkien, the historical Hokkien dialect of the Philippines. Some have also studied Mandarin, but currently, the youth are usually not fluent due to lack of practical exposure. Philippine Hokkien has vocabulary with that shares similarities with other Southeast Asian Hokkien dialects to its south, like Singaporean Hokkien, Penang Hokkien, and Medan Hokkien, and to its north, like Taiwanese Hokkien. Philippine Hokkien has preserved vocabulary that most Hokkien speakers in China would regard as old-fashioned.

==== Mestizo de Español (Spanish Mestizo) ====
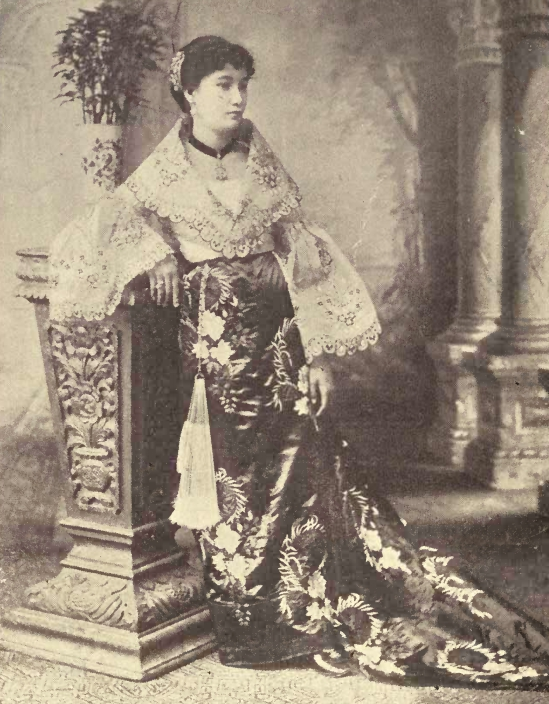
Spanish-Filipina Mestiza (1899)

These are the mixed descendants of the native peoples of the Philippines with the native Spanish or the Spanish diaspora in the Americas settlers who settled in the Spanish East Indies (Philippines) during the Spanish Era. Most were of either Spanish ancestry or Amerindian-Spanish ancestry (The term 'Mestizo' originated in Spanish American colonies). The first groups of Spaniards sailed in 1565 with Miguel López de Legazpi from New Spain, in what is now Jalisco state, Mexico to colonize the Philippines. In addition to this, select cities such as Manila, Vigan, Bauang, Naga, Iriga, Iloílo, Bacólod, Cebú and Zamboanga, which were home to military fortifications or commercial ports during the Spanish era, also hold sizable mestizo communities.

==== Mestizo de Sangley (Chinese Mestizo) ====
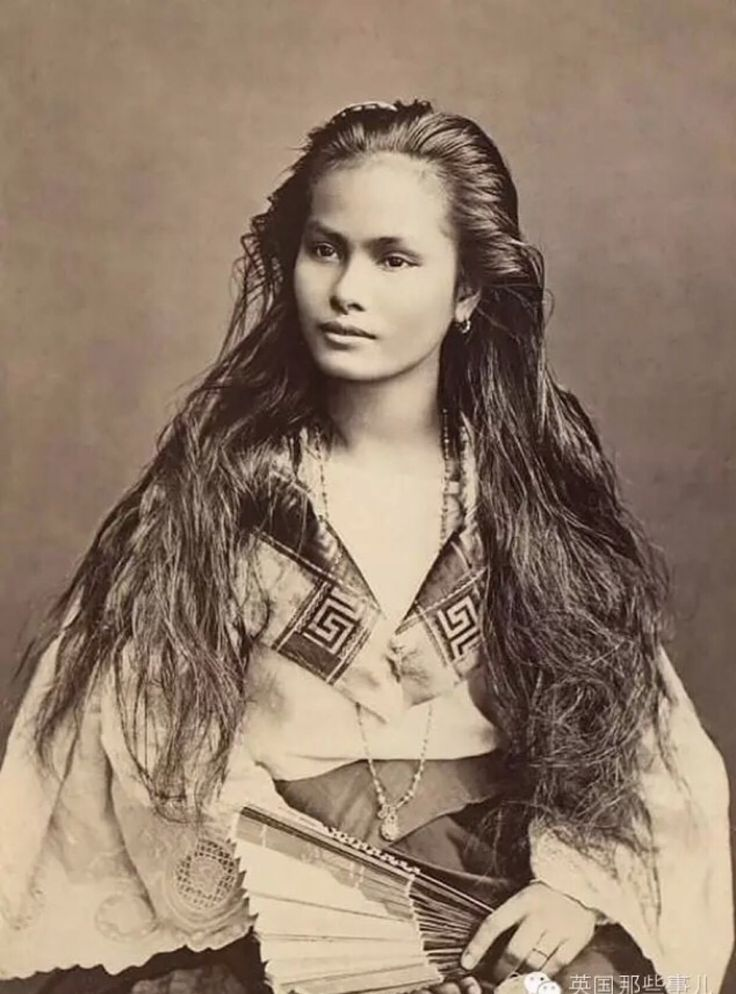
Mestiza Sangley-Filipina, c. 1875

Mestizo de sangley are the mixed descendants of the native peoples of the Philippines with the Sangley (Chinese) and sometimes Japanese migrants who settled in the Spanish East Indies (Philippines) during the Spanish Era. Most were of Hokkien ancestry, with a few being of Cantonese, Taishanese or Japanese ancestry. Sangley is a Hokkien word from sng-lí (生理) meaning "business",

==== Tornatrás (Spanish-Chinese Mestizo) ====
Torna atrás are the mixed descendants of the above Spanish Filipinos and Mestizos de Español with Chinese Filipinos and Mestizos de Sangley, who settled in the Spanish East Indies (Philippines) during the Spanish Era. Most now have native ancestry along with Hokkien or other Han Chinese/Japanese ancestry as well as Spanish ancestry.

==== American Filipino/Filipino American ====
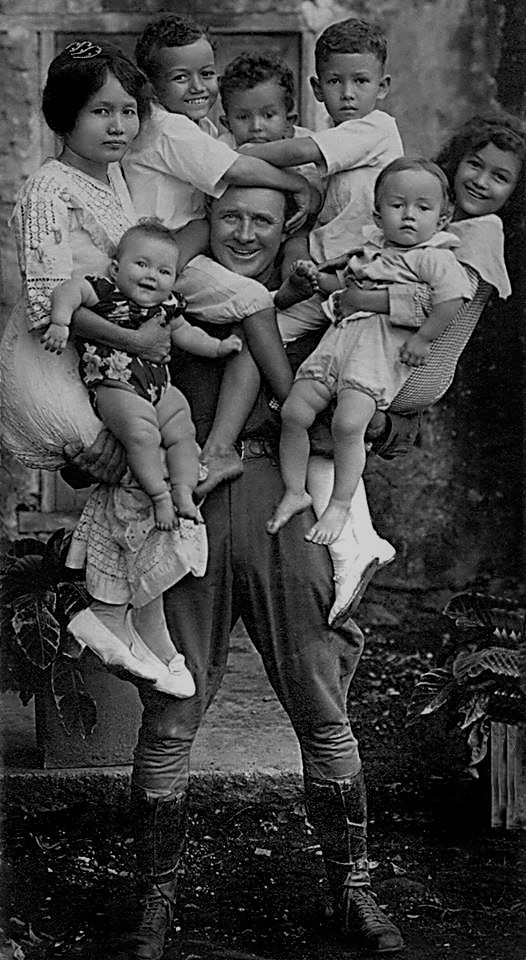
A Filipino American family in 1912

Americans (Amerikano/Kano) usually consist of various ethnicities such as whites (mostly descendants of European immigrants from Great Britain and Ireland), native Americans (aboriginal Americans who existed prior to European colonization) and black Americans (who descended from African slaves brought to America during the 1700s). American settlement in the Philippines began during the Spanish colonial period, when Americans came to the islands primarily to conduct business and trade. They owned many businesses in the sugar industry. There was not much American inflow to the Philippines until after the Philippine–American War. After the USA won the war and colonized the Philippines, thousands of Americans settled there temporarily or permanently. Most were either members of the U.S. military or Christian missionaries. After independence in 1946, many Americans chose to remain in the Philippines while maintaining relations with relatives in the US. Most of them were professionals, but missionaries continued to settle the country. In 2015, the U.S. State Department estimated that there were more than 220,000 U.S. citizens living in the Philippines, with a significant mixed population of Amerasians and descendants from the colonial era as well. Since 1898, when the United States annexed the Philippines from Spain, there were as many as 21 U.S. bases and 100,000 U.S. military personnel stationed there. The bases closed in 1992 leaving behind thousands of Amerasian children. There are an estimated 52,000 Amerasians in the Philippines, but an academic research paper presented in the U.S. (in 2012) by an Angeles, Pampanga, Philippines Amerasian college research study unit suggests that the number could be a lot more, possibly reaching 250,000 and thus forming 0.25% of the population. This is also partially due to the fact that almost all Amerasian intermarried with other Amerasian and Filipino natives. This group also includes Filipino American (Fil-Am), and sometimes Filipino Canadian, returnee migrants from the United States and Canada. During year 2025, there were a recorded number of 750,000 American citizens living in the Philippines, forming 0.75% of the population and when this is combined with the 0.25% of the population who are Amerasians, 1% of the Philippine population has American descent.

==== Indian Filipino/Mestizo de Bombay (Indian Mestizo) ====
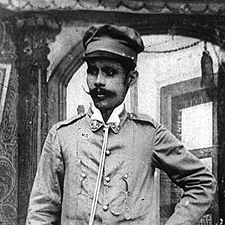
General Juan Cailles, leading insurgent officer, Laguna, 1899-1901

The Philippines has had historical connections with Indianized kingdoms, most notably with Srivijaya from the 7th century, but also in earlier eras. Indian culture, language, scripture, food, belief, arts, martial arts, and epics have had a profound impact on the pre-Spanish Philippines which is still visible today. They have contributed to the unique blend of cultures in the Philippines. One source has estimated the size of the Indian community in the Philippines at 150,000 persons in 2008 . Most Indians in the Philippines belong to either Sindhi or Punjabi ethnic groups, and are largely businessmen and traders. A smaller population of Indians belonging to the Marathi ethnic group form part of the clergy of Roman Catholic dioceses in the country. Besides age old indianized influences from indianized history of precolonial states inherited from neighboring Indonesia and Malaysia, Indian Filipinos (Bombay or Turko [Cebuano-speaking reference to Indian residents of Cebuano-speaking areas, probably mistaken for Turkic people especially from Turkey]) or Mestizo de Bombay are the mixed colonial descendants of the native peoples of the Philippines with the Indian or Bumbay migrants from Bombay (now Mumbai, Maharashtra) or Sepoy soldiers from Madras (now Chennai, Tamil Nadu) who settled in the Spanish East Indies (Philippines) during the Spanish Era, especially during the British occupation of Manila in the Seven Years' War. Many settled in what is Cainta, in what was then the Province of Manila (currently part of Rizal Province). As of 2006, between 70 and 75 percent of Indians in the Philippines lived in Metro Manila, with the largest community outside of Manila being in Isabela province. The region in and around Cainta still has many Sepoy descendants. However, Indian business people started to arrive in larger numbers in The Philippines during the American colonial period (1898–1930s) – especially during the 1930s and 1940s, when many Indians and Indian Filipinos lived in Filipino provinces, including Davao. The longest serving Mayor of Manila, Ramon Bagatsing, was of Indian-Punjabi descent, having moved to Manila from Fabrica, Negros Occidental before the second world war. A second surge of Indian businessmen, especially Sindhis arrived in the Philippines during the 1947 India-Pakistan partition. In the present day, most of the Indians and Indian Filipinos in the Philippines are Sindhi and Punjabi with a large Tamil population also existing. Many are fluent in Filipino (Tagalog) and English as well as other local languages of the provinces and islands. Many are prosperous middle-class citizens, with their main occupations being in clothing sales and marketing. Sikhs are involved largely in finance, money lending (locally called five-six), sales and marketing.

==== Japanese Filipino ====
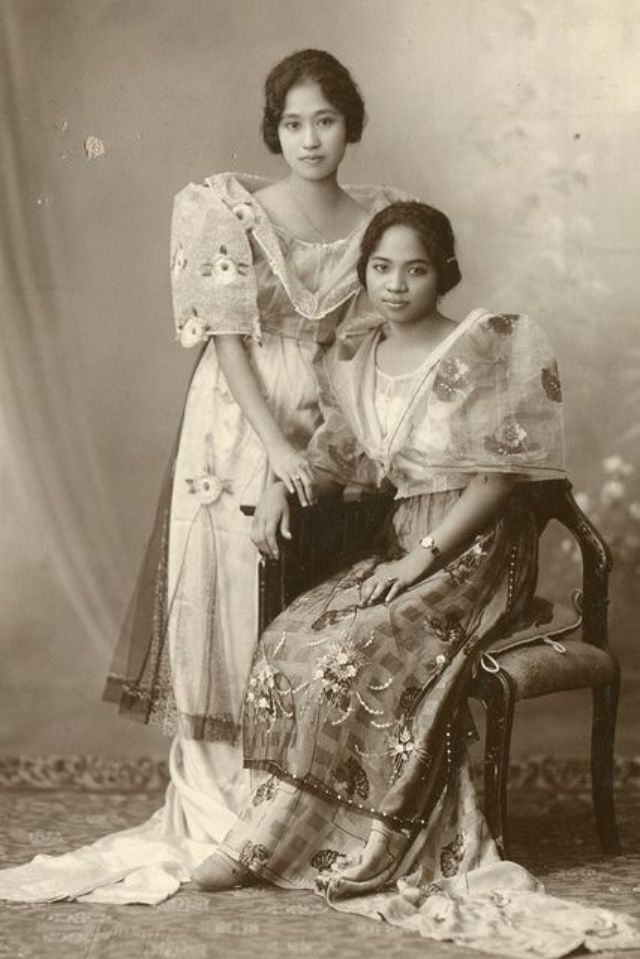
A Japanese Filipina woman wearing the Maria Clara gown, 1920

Japanese people have been settling in the Philippines for centuries even before World War II, therefore there has been much cultural and genetic blending. The Ryukyu Kingdom (located in modern-day Okinawa Prefecture) also had heavy trade and mixing in the Philippines, particularly in Northern Luzon, as depicted in the Boxer Codex.

Japanese Filipinos (Nikkei / Nikkeijin / Hapones / Haponesa / Japino) have an extensive history in the Philippines, such as trading during precolonial times like the extensive Rusun jar trade, the Japanese settlements found in Northern Luzon, and the Catholic Christian kirishitan exiles during the Edo period, but throughout the centuries, their numbers have dwindled as generations assimilated without much replenishment from Japan. In Spanish colonial times, they were called Iapon/Japon/Hapon or Xaponese/Japonés/Hapones or were sometimes also confused with Sangleys (Chinese mestizos), so their children too would sometimes be regarded as Mestizos de Sangley or Tornatrás. During the American colonial era, Japanese laborers were brought in to build the Benguet Road (Kennon Road) to Baguio, but eventually after the project, many moved to work in abaca plantations in Davao, where Davao soon became dubbed as Davaokuo (in Philippine and American media) or (in Japanese: 小日本國「こにっぽんこく」, romanized: Ko Nippon Koku, lit. 'Little Japan') with a Japanese school, a Shinto shrine and a diplomatic mission from Japan. The place that used to be "Little Tokyo" in Davao was Mintal. Many have roots from either Okinawa (Ryukyu) or Mainland Japan. When World War II broke out, many were killed or expelled because of their unwilling or willing fifth column collaboration with the Japanese Imperial Army (mostly as translators). This led to many Japanese mestizos who tended to deny their Japanese heritage and changed their family names in order to avoid discrimination. Eventually, many either intermarried and assimilated into the Filipino populace, such as those in Davao who intermarried with the Bagobo, and those in Baguio with the Igorot. Many eventually completely lost their Japanese identity while others have immigrated to the US or "returned" to Japan, the homeland of their forebears. Most Japanese Filipinos in the modern times (colloquially called Japino) are now fresh new immigrants from Japanese businessmen who went with female OFW entertainers in Japan. The Filipina mothers usually return to the Philippines with their children along with them. Other Japanese who stayed in the country initially came to the Philippines to learn English or set up businesses. These days, most Japanese Filipinos can be found around Davao, Baguio, Iloilo or Cebu, as well other cities and towns, with only a few around Metro Manila, though historically there were many around Manila, such as Plaza Dilao in Paco, Manila.

==== Sangil/Sangirese ====
The Sangil people (also called Sangir, Sangu, Marore, Sangirezen, or Talaoerezen) are originally from the Sangihe and Talaud Islands (now part of Indonesia) and parts of Davao Occidental (particularly in the Sarangani Islands), Davao del Norte, Davao del Sur, Sultan Kudarat, South Cotabato, and Cotabato. Their populations (much like the Sama-Bajau) were separated when borders were drawn between the Philippines and Indonesia during the colonial era. The Sangil people are traditionally animistic, much like other Lumad peoples. During the colonial era, the Sangil (who usually call themselves "Sangir") in the Sangihe Islands mostly converted to Protestant Christianity due to proximity and contact with the Christian Minahasa people of Sulawesi. In the Philippines, most Sangil converted to Islam due to the influence of the neighboring Sultanate of Maguindanao. However, elements of animistic rituals still remain. The Indonesian and Filipino groups still maintain ties and both Manado Malay and Cebuano are spoken in both Indonesian Sangir and Filipino Sangil, in addition to the Sangirese language. Indonesian Sangir even live in the Philippines, particularly Balut Island, Davao del Sur, Davao del Norte, Davao Oriental, Sarangani, Sultan Kudarat, Cotabato, South Cotabato, General Santos and Davao City, because of its proximity to Indonesia; they speak Cebuano & Tagalog as second languages & are Protestant Christians by faith. The exact population of Sangil people in the Philippines is unknown, but is estimated to be around 10,000 people.

==== Jewish Filipino ====
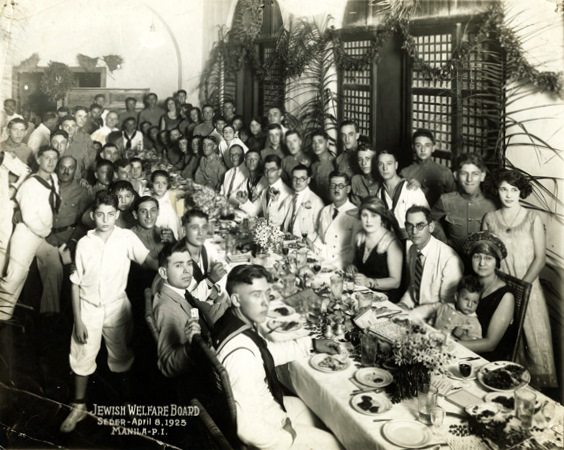
Group portrait of Passover Seder in Manila, 1925

As of 2005, Filipino Jews numbered at the most 500 people. Other estimates range between 100 and 18,500 people (0.000001% and 0.005% of the country's total population). As of 2011, Metro Manila has the largest Jewish community in the Philippines, which consists of roughly seventy families. The country's only synagogue, Beth Yaacov, is located in Makati, as is the Chabad House. There are, of course, other Jews elsewhere in the country, like the Bagelboys of Subic and Angeles City but these are obviously fewer and almost all transients, either diplomats or business envoys, and their existence is almost totally unknown in mainstream society. There are a few Israelis in Manila working at call centers and a few other executives. There are also a number of converts to Judaism.

== Recent modern immigrants and expatriates ==
These migrant groups are relatively recent immigrants and expatriate groups that mostly immigrated in the modern era, specifically around the 20th century especially from post-WW2 Philippine independence to the present era. Recent modern immigrants, expatriates, foreign students, foreign citizens with work permits and resident aliens are all included. Common reasons for modern immigration into the Philippines include employment, education, tourism, marriage migration counter flow from returning overseas Filipino workers and emigrants, etc. According to a 2013 country migration report, the recent most notable nationalities of foreign aliens with work permits include Koreans, Chinese, Japanese, Americans, Germans and British (either British citizen or British National (Overseas) – from British Hong Kong). Most of these foreign aliens with work permits are based in the National Capital Region (Metro Manila), followed by Calabarzon (Southern Tagalog), and Central Visayas, representing the more developed regions of the country. Most of them are employed in the manufacturing sector, although they tend to be involved in other sectors as well. The majority work in administrative, executive and managerial positions. The top three nationalities of registered aliens are Chinese (59,000), Koreans (39,000) and Americans (26,000). According to the 2010 Census of Population and Housing, the top five countries of origin of foreign citizens were: the United States of America (29,959), China, (28,750), Japan (11,583), and India (8,963) (NSO, 2012). Europeans, Africans, or those from other American countries are often confused with Americans in the Philippines, leading to many being referred to as Kano (short for Amerikano).

== See also ==
- Demographics of the Philippines
- List of sovereign state leaders in the Philippines
- Indigenous peoples of the Philippines
- Philippine population by country of citizenship
