= Soccsksargen =

Soccsksargen Region XII (Central Mindanao)
- Region
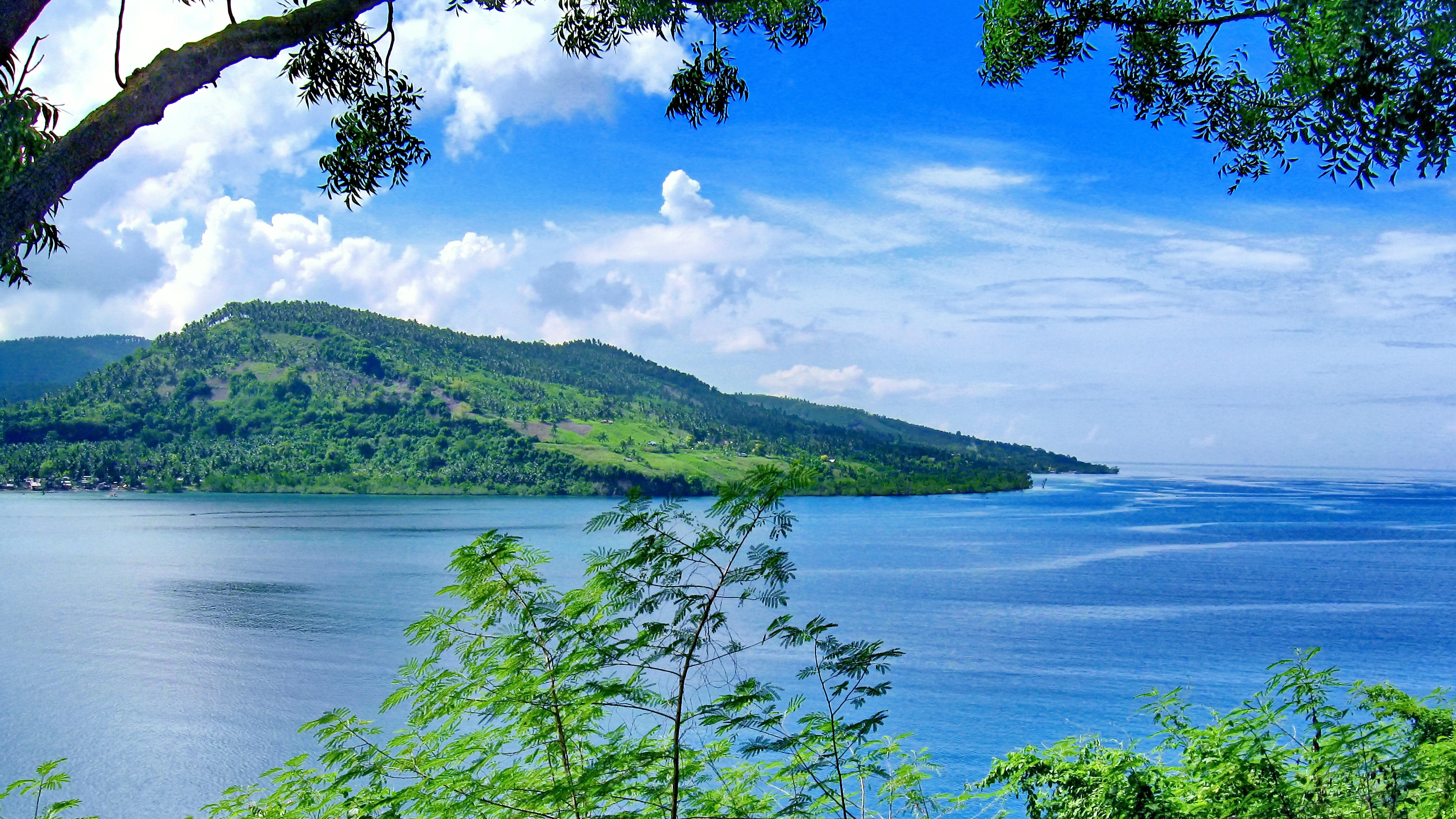
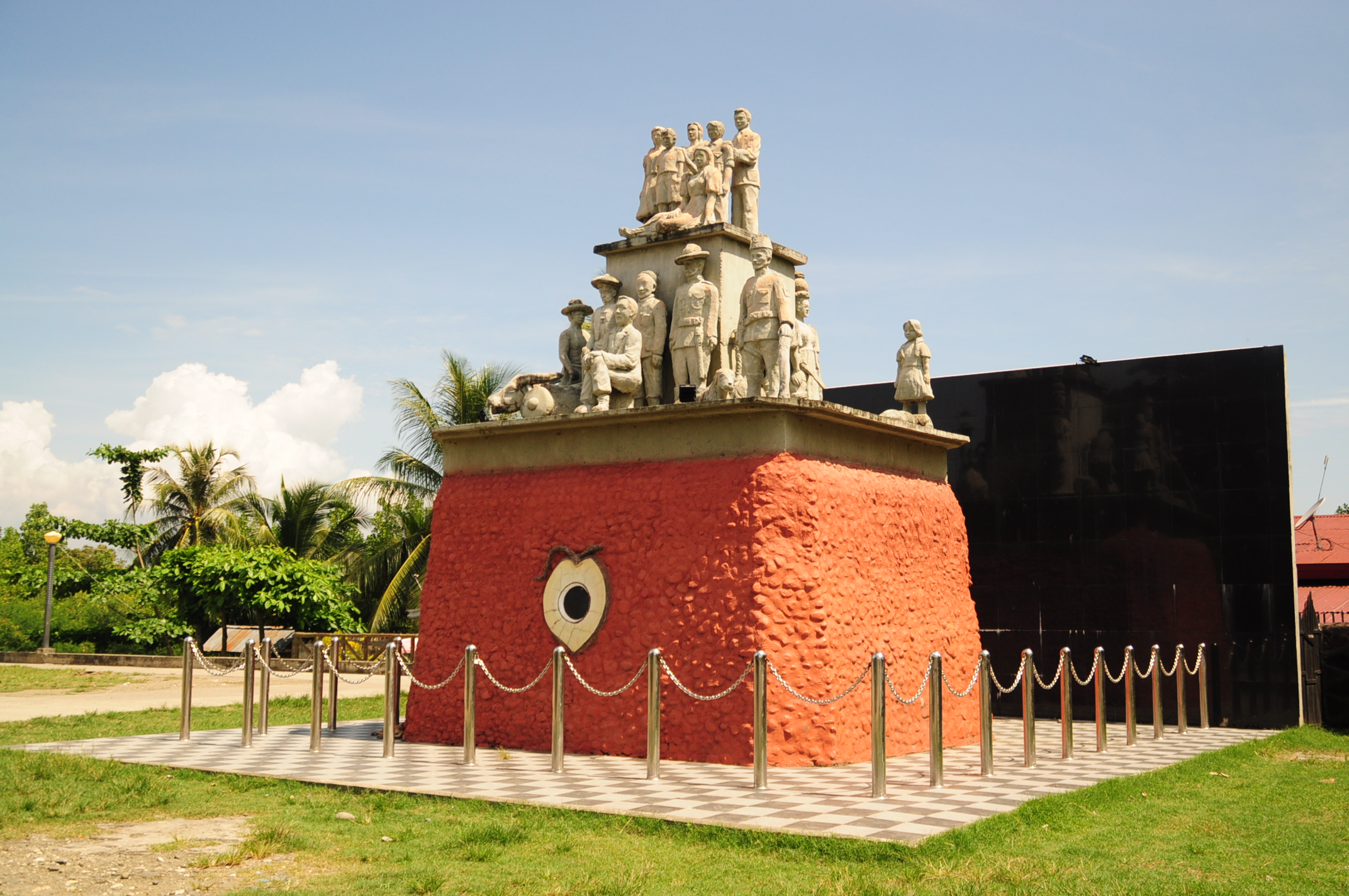
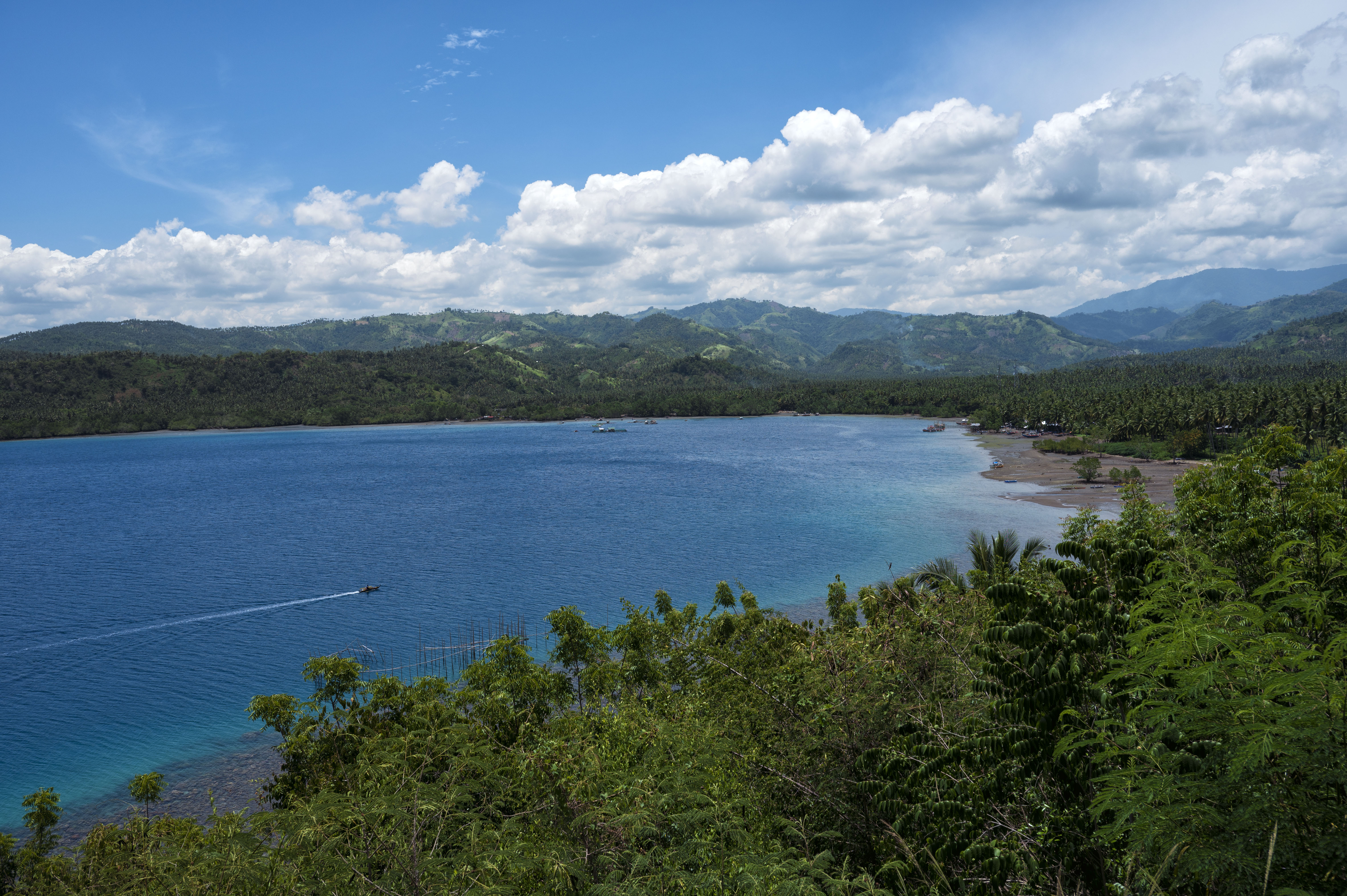
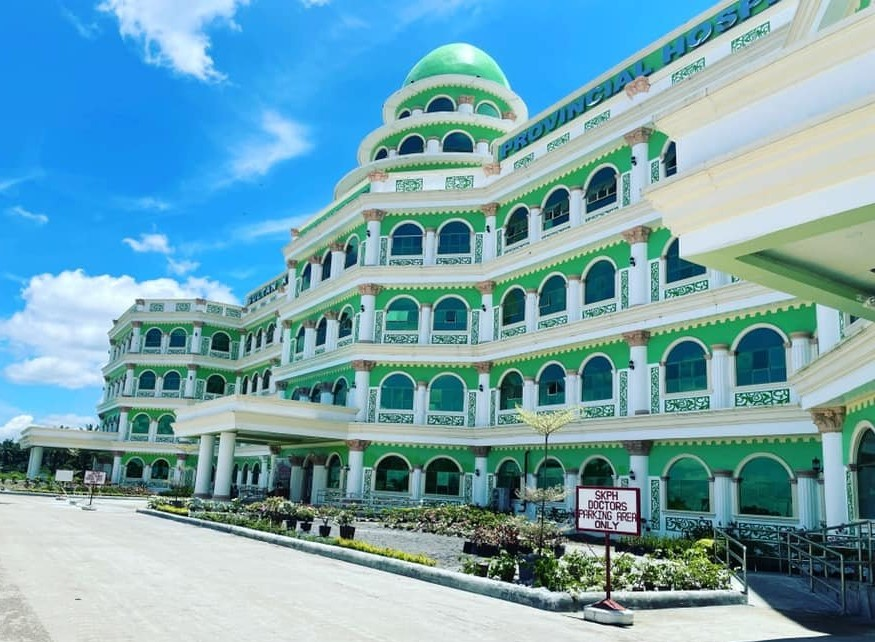
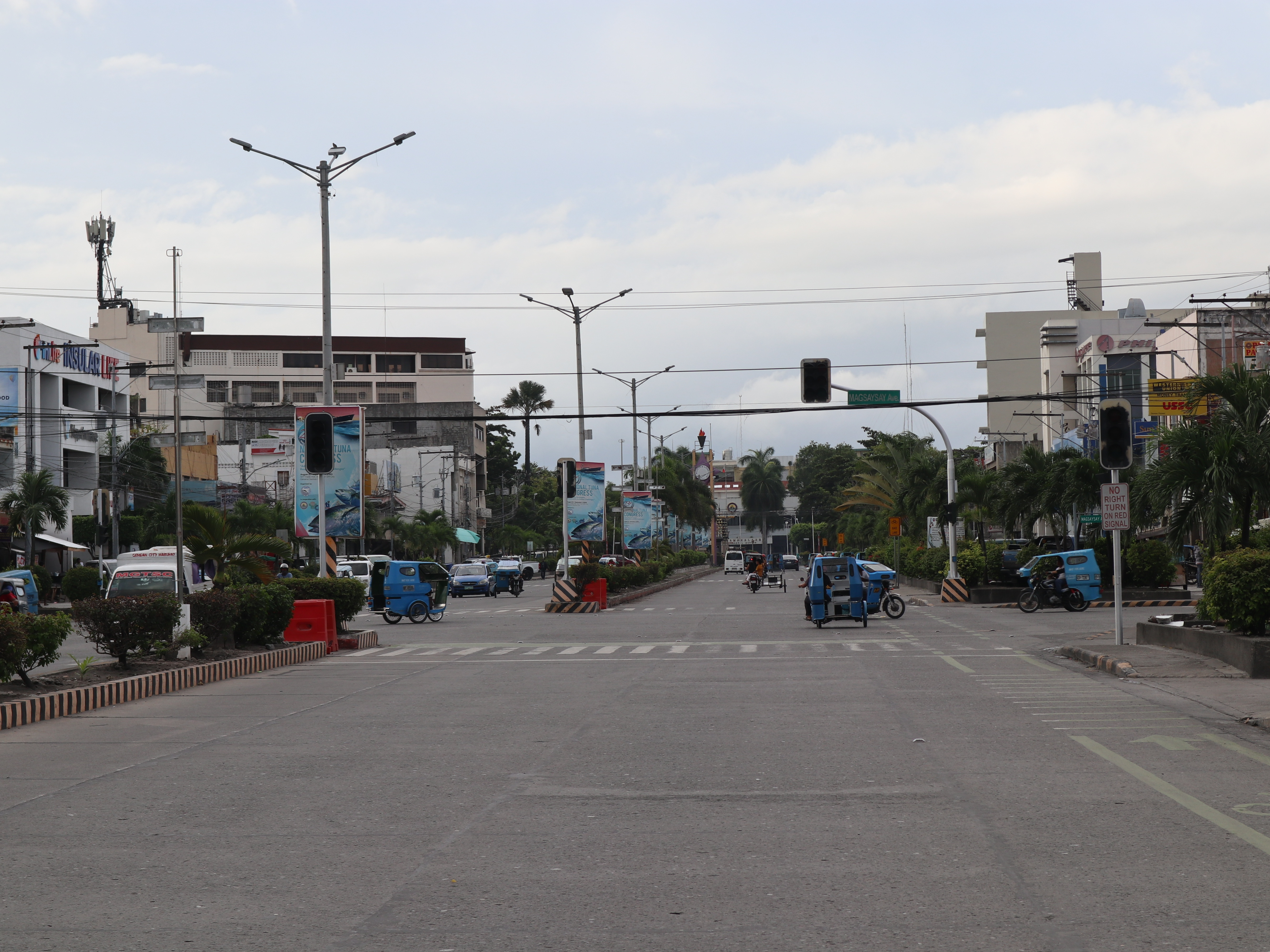
- Left to right, top to bottom: Sarangani Bay; Agricultural Colony No. 9 Monument; shoreline of Glan, Sarangani; Sultan Kudarat Provincial Hospital; and General Santos, the Commerce and Industrial Center of Region 12
- Anthem: Rehiyon Dose Hymn
- Location in the Philippines
- Interactive map of Soccsksargen
- Coordinates: 6°30′N 124°51′E
- Country: Philippines
- Island group: Mindanao
- Regional center: Koronadal
- Largest city: General Santos

Area
  - Total: 22,513.30 km^{2} (8,692.43 sq mi)
- Highest elevation (Mount Apo): 2,450 m (8,040 ft)

Population (2024 census)
  - Total: 4,462,776
  - Density: 198.2284/km^{2} (513.4093/sq mi)
  - Households: 1,065,453

Divisions
  - Provinces: 4: Cotabato; South Cotabato; Sarangani; Sultan Kudarat
  - Independent cities: 1: General Santos
  - Component cities: 3: Kidapawan; Koronadal; Tacurong
  - Municipalities: 45
  - Barangays: 1,095
  - Districts: 10

Economy
  - Poverty incidence: 9.6% (2025)
  - GDP total: US$11.8 billion
  - GDP per capita: US$2,598
  - HDI (2023): 0.693 medium · 14th of 17
- Time zone: UTC+8 (PST)
- PSGC: 120000000
- ISO 3166 code: PH-12
- Electorate: 2,701,992 voters (2025)
- Languages: Hiligaynon; Maguindanaon; Cebuano; Iranun; Sarangani; Tboli; Blaan; Dulangan Manobo; Obo; Tagabawa; Teduray; Ilianen; Karay-a; Ilocano; Soccsksargen Filipino; Filipino; English; Sangirese

Soccsksargen (Note: The name Soccsksargen is an acronym formed from the names of its component provinces and one city: Soc for South Cotabato, c for Cotabato, sk for Sultan Kudarat, sar for Sarangani, and gen for General Santos.) (Tagalog: [sokˈsardʒɛn]), designated as Region XII, is an administrative region of the Philippines. Formerly known as Central Mindanao, it is located in south-central Mindanao and comprises four provinces: Cotabato, Sarangani, South Cotabato, and Sultan Kudarat, and aside from these provinces it also is located in one highly urbanized city, General Santos. The regional center is Koronadal in South Cotabato, while the center of commerce and industry is General Santos, the most populous city in the region.

== Geography ==
The region is bounded on the north by the province of Bukidnon in Northern Mindanao, on the east by the Davao Region, on the northwest and west by the Bangsamoro region, and on the southwest by the Celebes Sea. The region also shares a maritime border with Gorontalo and North Sulawesi provinces of Indonesia.

The region has extensive coastlines, valleys and mountain ranges. Known for its river system, the region is the drainage basin of Mindanao, particularly at the Cotabato Basin, a large depression surrounded by mountain ranges on three sides. Within the basin runs the Rio Grande de Mindanao, the longest river in Mindanao and the second longest in the Philippines. The river empties into Illana Bay of the larger Moro Gulf to the west of Cotabato City.

At the south of the basin lie the Tiruray Highlands, a moderately high mountain range blocking the basin from the southern coastline. Southeast of the mountains lies Sarangani Bay.

=== Administrative divisions ===
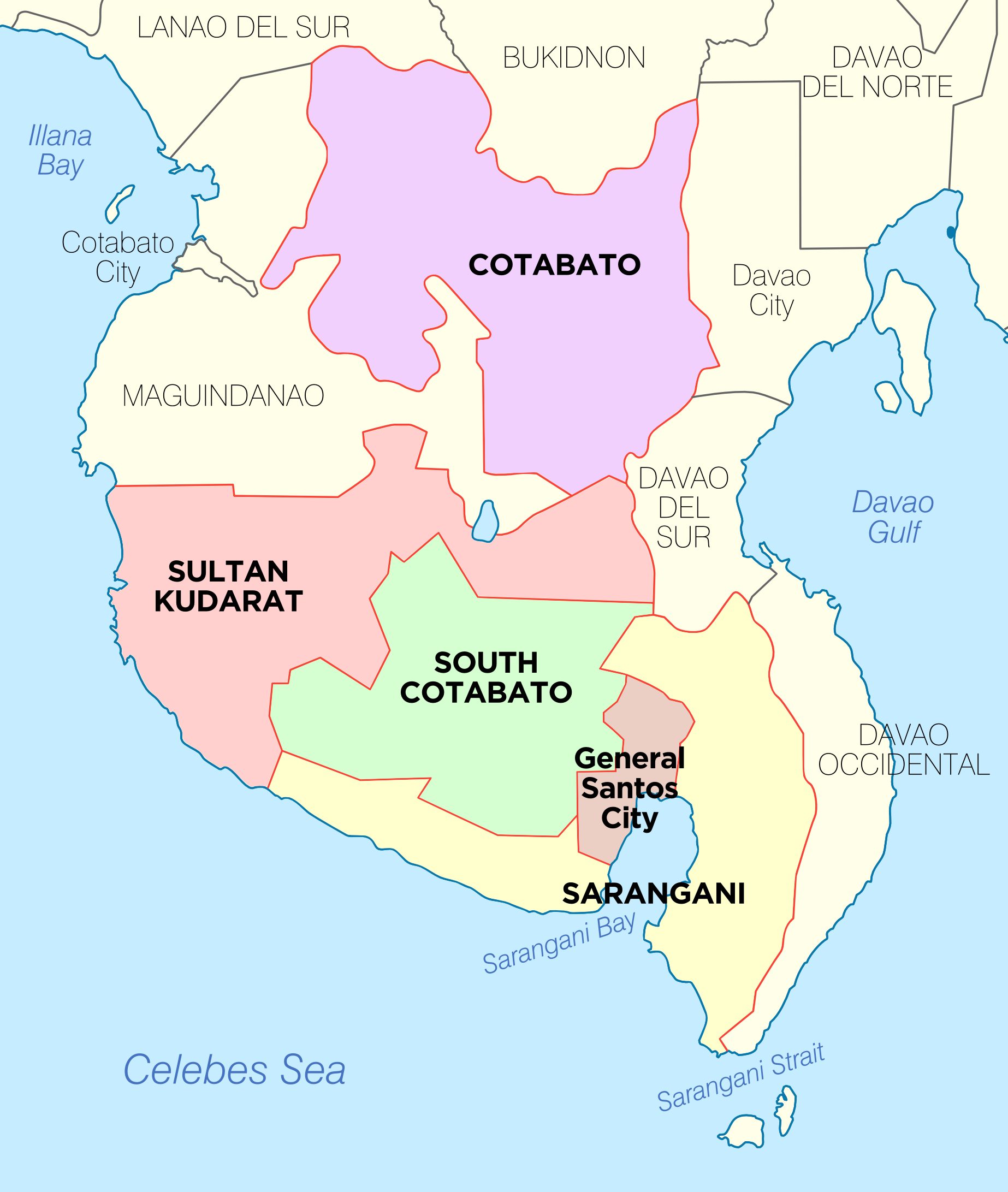
Map of Region XII

==== Provinces ====
Soccsksargen comprises four provinces, one highly urbanized city, three component cities, 45 municipalities and 1,195 barangays.

Province or city		Capital	Population (2020)		Area		Density		Cities	Muni.	Barangay
					km^{2}	sq mi	/km^{2}	/sq mi			
Cotabato		Kidapawan City	29.2%	1,275,185	9,008.90	3,478.36	150	390	1	17	480
Sarangani		Alabel	12.8%	558,946	3,601.25	1,390.45	150	390	0	7	141
South Cotabato		Koronadal City	22.4%	975,476	3,935.95	1,519.68	230	600	1	10	200
Sultan Kudarat		Isulan	19.6%	854,052	5,298.34	2,045.70	150	390	1	11	249
General Santos	†	—	16.0%	697,315	492.86	190.29	1,200	3,100	—	—	26
Total				4,360,964	22,786.08	8,797.75	200	520	4	45	1,096
† General Santos is a highly urbanized city; figures are excluded from South Cotabato.; Figures exclude the 63 barangays under the Special Geographic Area, which are geographically situated in Cotabato but under the administration of Bangsamoro.

===== Governors and vice governors =====
Province	Image	Governor	Political party	Vice governor
Cotabato		Emmylou Taliño-Mendoza	Nacionalista	Rochella Marie T. Taray
Sarangani		Rogelio Pacquiao	PFP	Danny A. Martinez
South Cotabato		Reynaldo Tamayo Jr.	PFP	Arthur Yusay Pingoy
Sultan Kudarat		Datu Pax Ali Mangudadatu	Lakas	Raden Camlian Sakaluran

=== Cities ===
==== Component cities ====
- Kidapawan — the only city of Cotabato province
- † Koronadal — the political regional center of Soccsksargen
- Tacurong — only city of Sultan Kudarat

==== Highly urbanized city ====
- General Santos — a highly urbanized city, it serves as the center of the Metropolitan and Regional Center for trade and industry of Soccsksargen.
- † Regional center

Rank	City	Area (km^{2})	Population as of 2020	Tax collection as of 2012	Locally sourced revenue as of 2023	IRA as of 2015	NTA as of 2026	Income class
1.	General Santos	492.86	697,315	P1.175 billion	₱ 1,077,293,753	Php 1,086.25 million	₱ 3,441.84 million	1st
2.	† Koronadal	277.00	195,398	P917 million (including South Cotabato)	₱ 413,450,608	Php 504.77 million	₱ 1,536.88 million	1st
3.	Kidapawan	358.47	160,791	P554 million (including Cotabato Province)	₱ 318,303,304	Php 509.68 million	₱ 1,573.00 million	1st
4.	Tacurong	153.40	109,319	P555 million (including Sultan Kudarat Province)	₱ 217,553,197	Php 350.57 million	₱ 1,059.71 million	3rd

== History ==
The oldest civilization in the region is located in Maitum, Sarangani, where the Maitum Anthropomorphic Pottery were found. The jars have been declared as National Cultural Treasures, and are subject to the high protections ensured by Philippine and international laws.

From around the 14th century until the early 20th century, the Muslim sultanates of Maguindanao and Buayan dominated the large parts of Soccsksargen region, influencing the local datus in the area as well as having General Santos City under their direct control as a port.

=== Central Mindanao ===
The region used to be named Central Mindanao. Prior to the creation of the Autonomous Region in Muslim Mindanao (ARMM), it comprised the following provinces:

- Maguindanao
- North Cotabato
- Sultan Kudarat
- Lanao del Norte
- Lanao del Sur

With the creation of ARMM, Lanao del Sur, Maguindanao (excluding Cotabato City), and Sultan Kudarat were removed from the region, leaving Lanao del Norte and Cotabato, and Iligan, Marawi and Cotabato City as constituent provinces and cities. Lanao del Norte and Iligan were later transferred to Northern Mindanao in September 2001 as they are farther from Cotabato City and closer to Cagayan de Oro (regional capital of Northern Mindanao), while Marawi became part of the ARMM.

On December 18, 1998, Sultan Kudarat was transferred back to Central Mindanao through Republic Act No. 8744.

=== Soccsksargen ===
In September 2001, Executive Order No. 36 was signed by President Gloria Macapagal Arroyo transferring South Cotabato, Sarangani, General Santos (also known as the SocSarGen District), from Southern Mindanao to Region XII, and renaming the region, from Central Mindanao, to Soccsksargen.

=== Koronadal as new regional center ===
By virtue of Executive Order No. 304 signed by then President Gloria Macapagal Arroyo, Koronadal was named as the regional political and socio-economic center of Soccsksargen on March 30, 2004. Regional departments, bureaus and offices were ordered to move from Cotabato City, the former regional center of the region.

=== Special Cotabato barangays and Cotabato City exit ===
Traditionally resisting efforts for inclusion to the Autonomous Region in Muslim Mindanao despite serving as the government center of the ARMM, the January 21, 2019 Bangsamoro Autonomous Region creation plebiscite resulted in the surprise ratification of the Bangsamoro Organic Law in Cotabato City. This means the city may now formally serve as the capital of the region and the offices of the former ARMM will be retained for use by the Bangsamoro Regional Government and now formally no longer constitutes part of the Soccsksargen Region.

In addition to Cotabato City, 63 barangays in Cotabato province opted to join Bangsamoro, thus exiting the region as well.

== Demographics ==
Population census of Soccsksargen

Year	Pop.	±% p.a.
1903	34,729	—
1918	67,561	+4.54%
1939	124,035	+2.94%
1948	147,037	+1.91%
1960	567,032	+11.90%
1970	1,125,779	+7.09%

Year	Pop.	±% p.a.
1975	1,297,981	+2.90%
1980	1,638,856	+4.77%
1990	2,272,888	+3.33%
1995	2,700,187	+3.28%
2000	3,058,320	+2.71%
2007	3,571,347	+2.16%

Year	Pop.	±% p.a.
2010	3,837,785	+2.65%
2015	4,245,838	+1.94%
2020	4,360,974	+0.56%
2024	4,462,776	+0.56%

Data includes Cotabato City, which is now part of Bangsamoro.
Source: Philippine Statistics Authority

Soccsksargen is home to diverse ethnolingustic and cultural backgrounds, both native and non-native residents, making it a melting pot of cultures. The first inhabitants of the region were the indigenous B'laans, T'bolis, Manobos, Tedurays and the Muslim Iranuns, Maguindanaons, and Sangil – large parts of the region itself historically were part of the Maguindanao and Buayan sultanates. Christian migrants from Luzon and Visayas (and their native-born descendants) also settled in the area by the early 20th century seeking better opportunities, mainly from agriculture. Most of these non-native settlers mainly came from Ilocandia, Panay, Negros, Cebu, Bohol and Siquijor who call Soccsksargen and Mindanao as a whole their new home and are responsible for spreading Christianity throughout the region over the years. Today, Hiligaynons make up the majority of the region's non-native Christian population; while the Cebuanos dominantly inhabit the entirety of Sarangani, General Santos and its neighboring municipalities of South Cotabato and the areas in the region that border Bukidnon and Davao Region; and Ilocanos who form the majority in Kabacan (Cotabato), Tampakan, Tantangan (both in South Cotabato), Lambayong, Senator Ninoy Aquino, President Quirino, Columbio (all in Sultan Kudarat) and Kiamba (Sarangani, though most of the municipality's inhabitants now speak Cebuano instead of Ilocano). Moreover, intermarriage between ethnolinguistic groups is relatively not uncommon in Soccsksargen.

== Economy ==
Poverty incidence of Soccsksargen (%)

Source: Philippine Statistics Authority

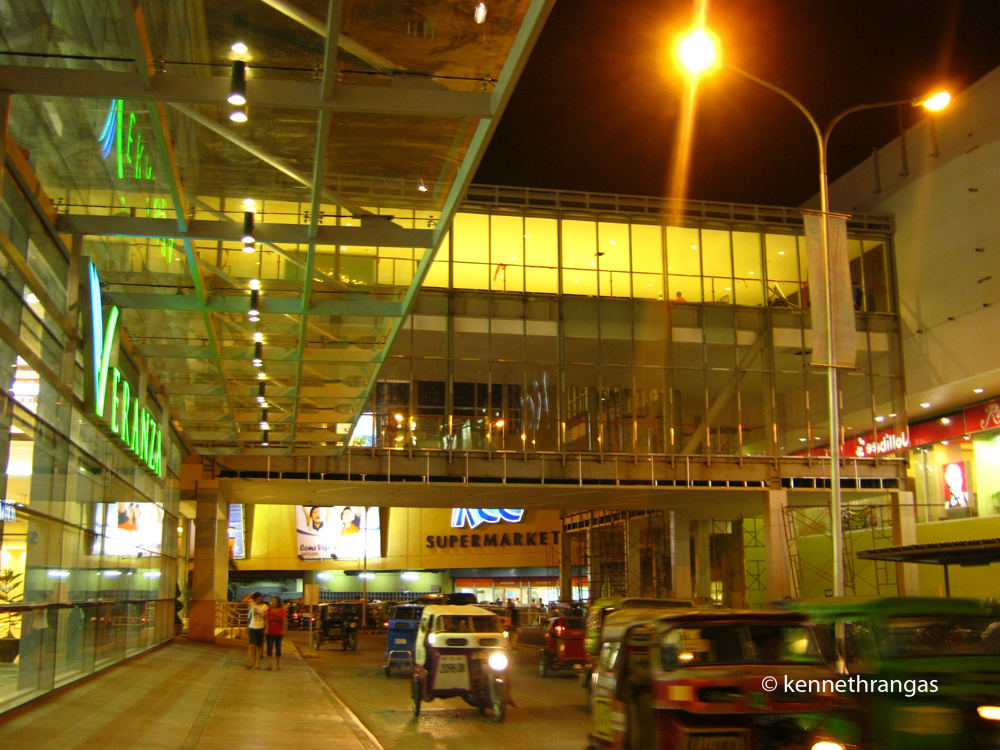
Two storey bridge connecting KCC mall of Gensan and Veranza Mall

The region contributes to the national GDP with 2.6% with 5% growth compared to 2016. It accounts for 18.3% of Mindanao gross regional domestic product (GRDP).

The 2024 Philippine Coffee Quality Competition showcased Region 12's development as a dominant force in coffee quality, having it's farmers take first, second, fifth, and sixth place in the competition.

== Musical heritage ==
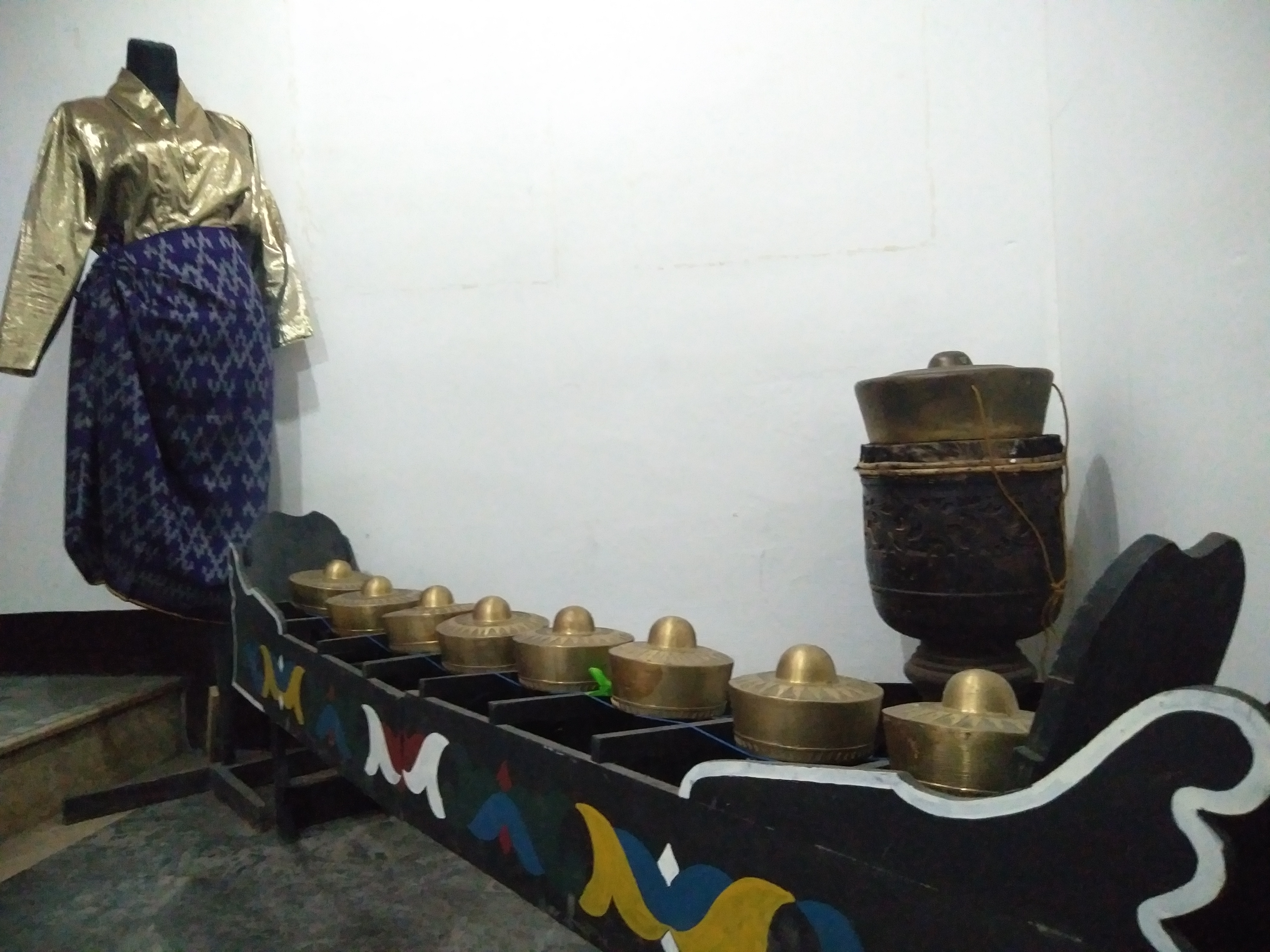
Maguindanaon Kulintang exhibited in Old Cotabato City Hall Museum

The artistic cultural heritage of the native Maguindanao people, among other regional groups—both Muslims and Catholics—revolves around kulintang music, a specific type of gong music. Unique to the Soccsksargen, elements of kulintang may be loosely compared to Indonesia’s gamelan music, and other related traditional performance arts.

== Government ==
- Cotabato – Gov. Emmylou J. Taliño-Mendoza (Nacionalista)
- South Cotabato – Gov. Reynaldo S. Tamayo Jr. (PFP)
- Sultan Kudarat – Gov. Pax Ali S. Mangudadatu (Lakas)
- Sarangani – Gov. Rogelio D. Pacquiao (PCM)
- General Santos (HUC) – Mayor Lorelie "Lor" Pacquiao (PCM)
