= Northern Mindanao =

Administrative region of the Philippines

Northern Mindanao Region X
- Region
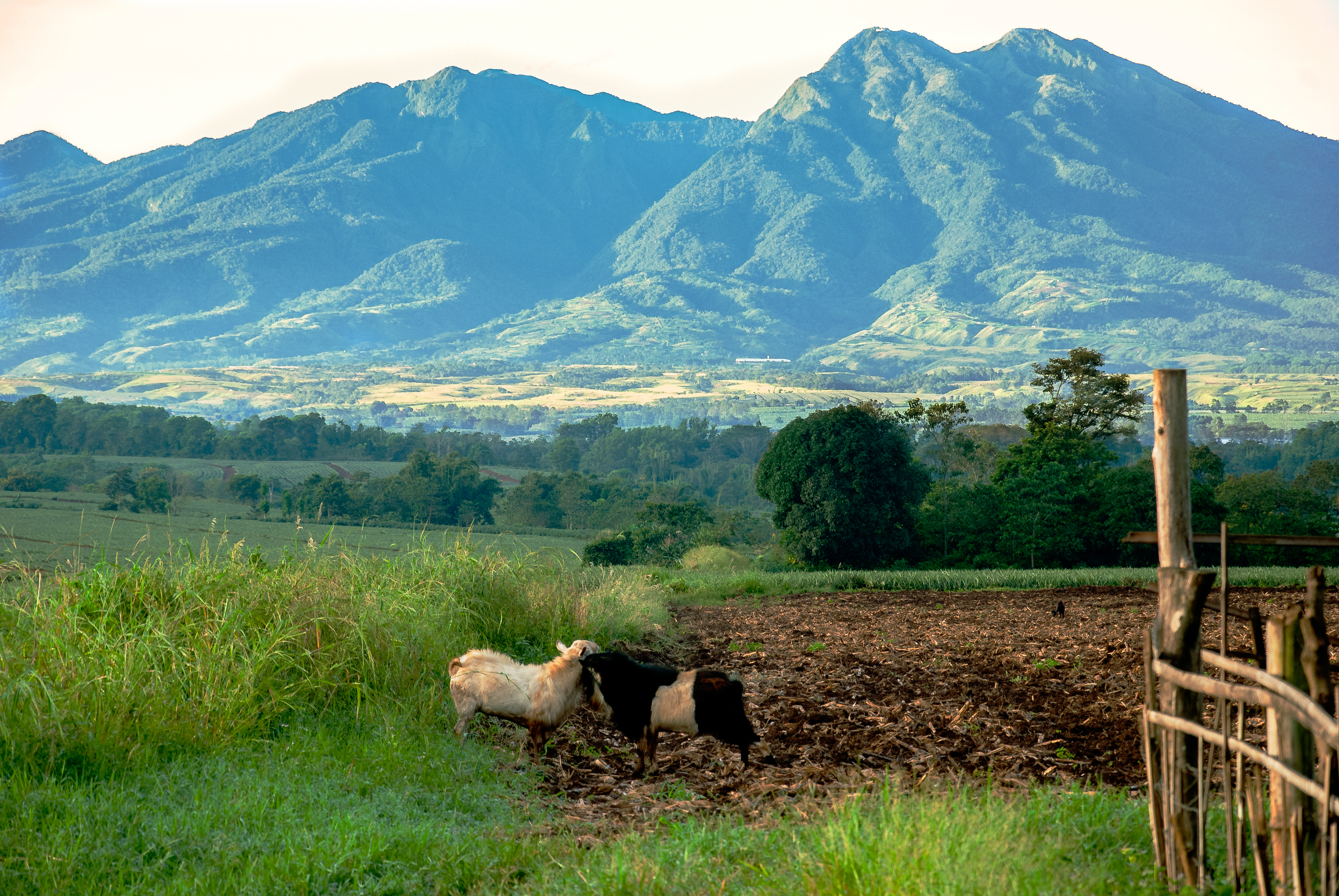
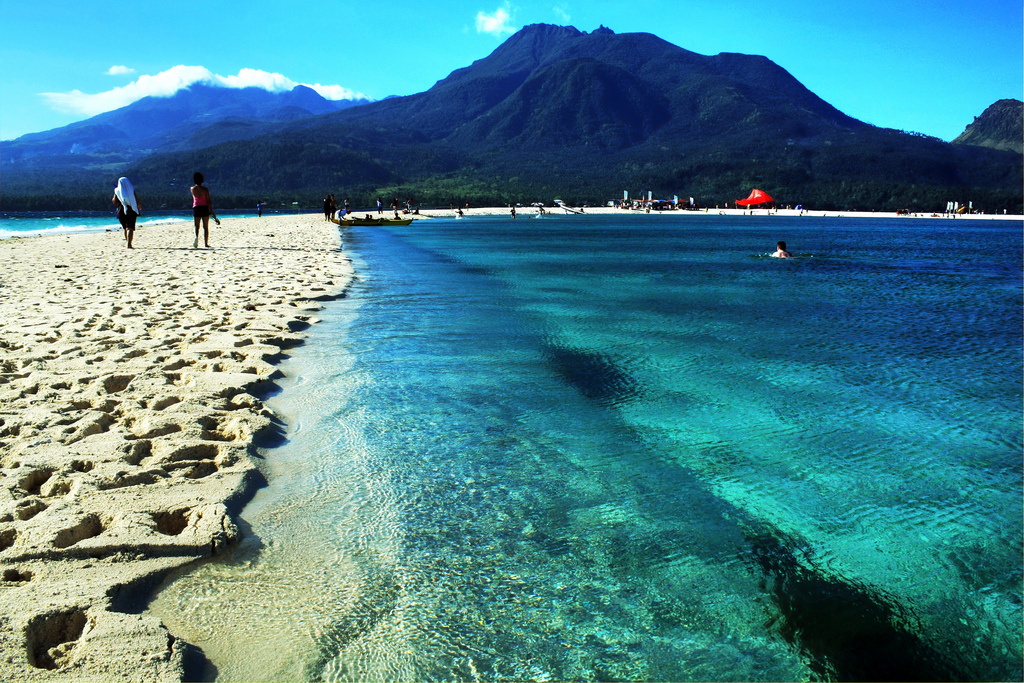
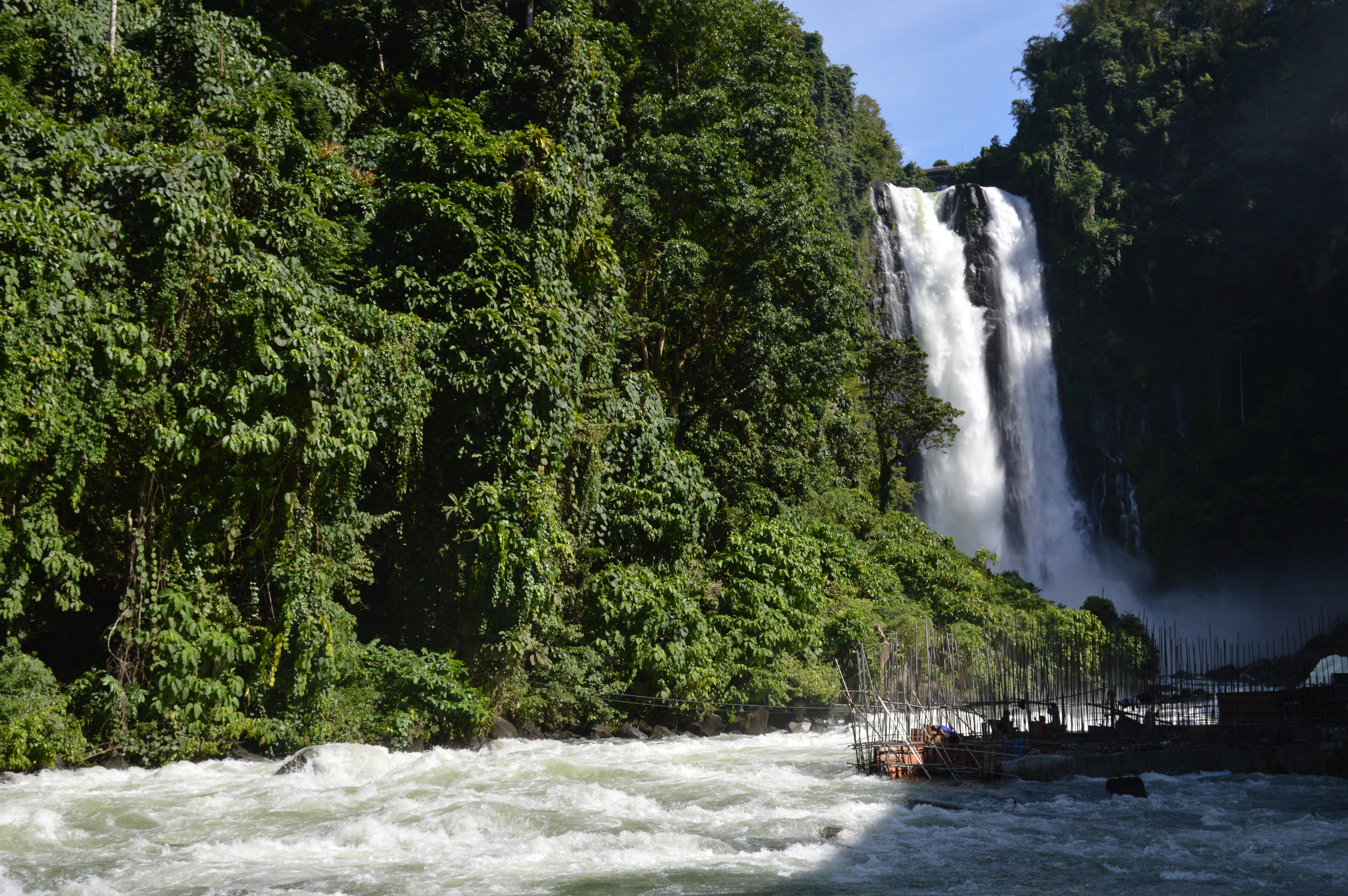
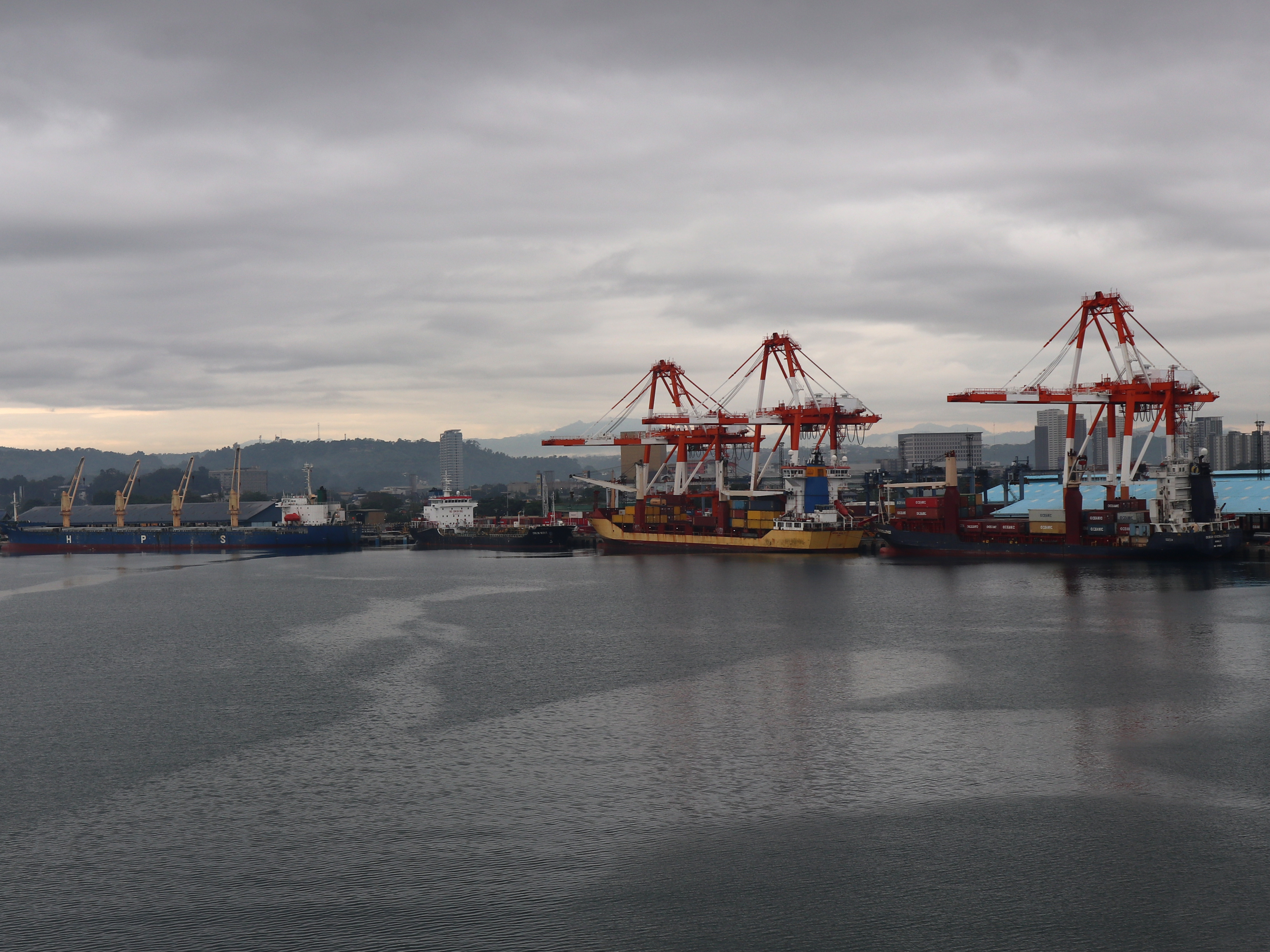
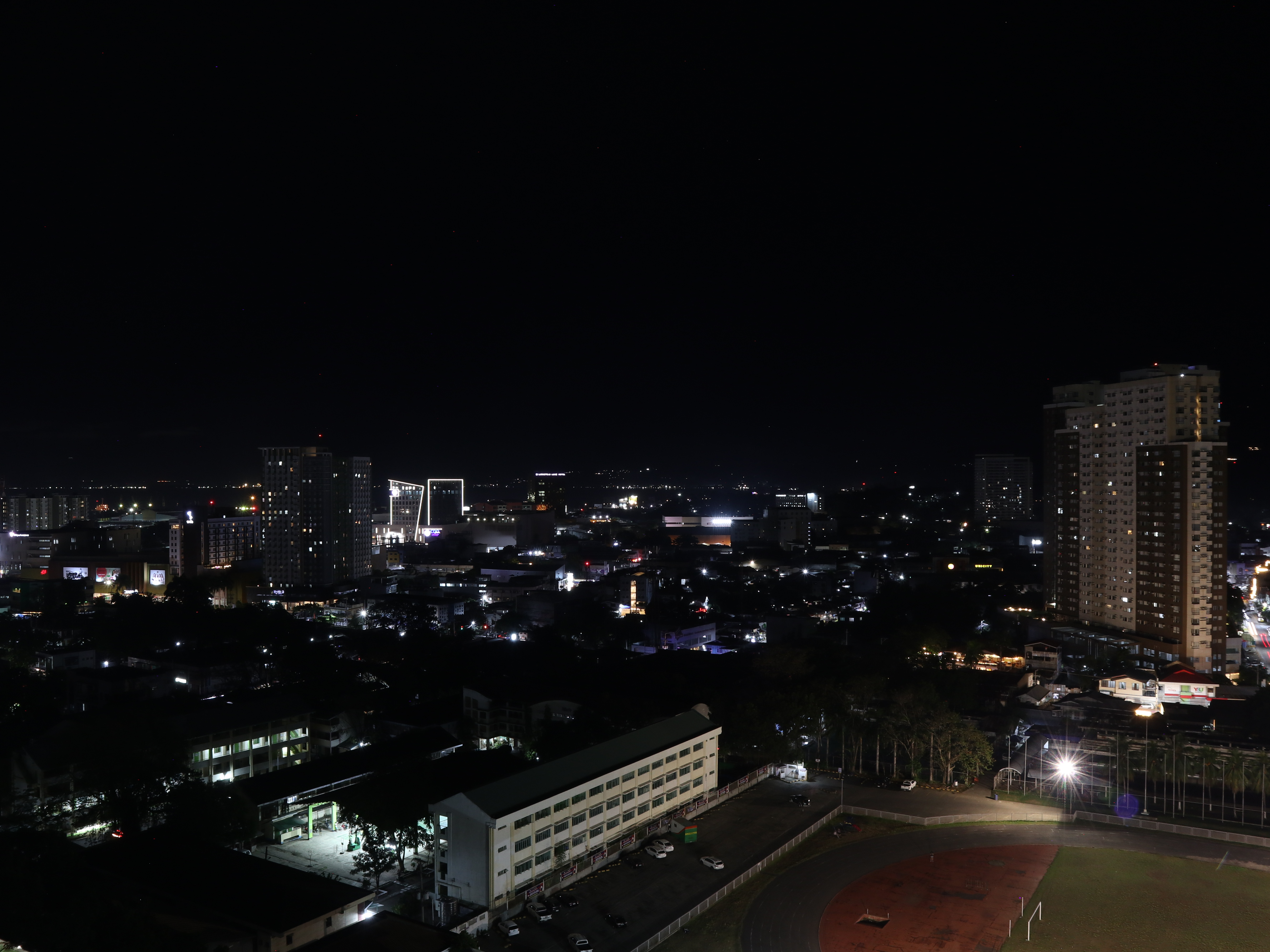
- From top, left to right: Kitanglad Mountain Range in Bukidnon, White Island in Camiguin, Maria Cristina Falls in Iligan, Port of Cagayan de Oro in Misamis Oriental, and Skyline of Cagayan de Oro
- Anthem: "Martsa Rehiyon Diyes"; Old Version Revised Version
- Location in the Philippines
- Interactive map of Northern Mindanao
- Coordinates: 8°45′N 124°55′E
- Country: Philippines
- Island group: Mindanao
- Regional center and largest city: Cagayan de Oro

Area
  - Total: 20,496.02 km^{2} (7,913.56 sq mi)
- Highest elevation (Mount Dulang-dulang): 2,941 m (9,649 ft)

Population (2024 census)
  - Total: 5,178,326
  - Density: 252.6503/km^{2} (654.3613/sq mi)
  - Households: 1,197,736

Divisions
  - Provinces: 5: Bukidnon; Camiguin; Lanao del Norte; Misamis Occidental; Misamis Oriental
  - Independent cities: 2: Cagayan de Oro; Iligan
  - Component cities: 7: El Salvador; Gingoog; Malaybalay; Oroquieta; Ozamiz; Tangub; Valencia
  - Municipalities: 84
  - Barangays: 2,022
  - Districts: 14

Economy
  - Poverty incidence: 14.4% (2025)
  - GDP total: US$22.3 billion
  - GDP per capita: US$4,276
  - HDI (2023): 0.721 high · 7th of 17
- Time zone: UTC+8 (PST)
- PSGC: 100000000
- ISO 3166 code: PH-10
- Electorate: 3,179,252 voters (2025)
- Languages: Cebuano; Maranao; Subanen; Higaonon; Bukid; Kamigin; Ilianen; Matigsalug; Iranun; Western Bukidnon; Hiligaynon; Waray; Tagalog
- Website: www.northernmindanao.com

Northern Mindanao (Cebuano: Amihanang Mindanao; Maranao: Pangotaraan Mindanao; Filipino: Hilagang Mindanao), designated as Region X, is an administrative region in the Philippines. It comprises five provinces: Bukidnon, Camiguin, Misamis Occidental, Misamis Oriental, and Lanao del Norte, as well as two highly urbanized cities: Cagayan de Oro and Iligan, all occupying the northern-central part of Mindanao, including the island of Camiguin. The regional center and largest city is Cagayan de Oro.

== Etymology and history ==
The current name of the region was derived from its position on Mindanao island. The term was officially coined by the Americans after the establishment of American colonial rule in the Philippines due to the defeat of Filipino revolutionaries. There have been proposals to rename the current Northern Mindanao region, which is dominated by the Cebuano ethnic group, into the Amihanan region. Amihanan literally translates to 'northern area' from the Cebuano language, which is the lingua franca of the region.

Lanao del Norte was transferred to Northern Mindanao from Region XII (then called Central Mindanao) by virtue of Executive Order No. 36 in September 2001.

== Geography ==
Northern Mindanao has a total land area of 2,049,602 hectares (5,064,680 acres). More than 60% of Northern Mindanao's total land area are classified as forest land. Its seas abound with fish and other marine products. The abundant vegetation, natural springs and high elevation contribute to the region's cool, mild and invigorating climate.

=== Administrative divisions ===
Map of Region X (Northern Mindanao)

Northern Mindanao consists of five provinces, two highly urbanized cities, seven component cities, 84 municipalities, and 2,022 barangays.

==== Provinces ====
- † Regional center

Province or HUC		Provincial Capital	Population (2024)		Area		Density		Cities	Muni.	Barangay
					km^{2}	sq mi	/km^{2}	/sq mi			
Bukidnon		Malaybalay	30.9%	1,601,902	10,498.59	4,053.53	150	390	2	20	464
Camiguin		Mambajao	1.8%	94,892	241.44	93.22	390	1,000	0	5	58
Lanao del Norte		Tubod	14.7%	761,725	3,354.16	1,295.05	230	600	0	22	462
Misamis Occidental		Oroquieta City	12.0%	621,993	2,055.22	793.52	300	780	3	14	490
Misamis Oriental		† Cagayan de Oro	19.1%	988,065	3,131.52	1,209.09	320	830	2	23	424
Cagayan de Oro	†	—	14.3%	741,617	412.80	159.38	1,800	4,700	—	—	80
Iligan	†	—	7.1%	368,132	813.37	314.04	450	1,200	—	—	44
Total				5,178,326	20,458.51	7,899.07	250	650	9	84	2,022
† Cagayan de Oro and Iligan are highly urbanized cities; figures are excluded from Misamis Oriental and Lanao del Norte respectively.

===== Governors and vice governors =====
Province	Image	Governor	Political Party	Vice Governor
Bukidnon		Rogelio Neil Roque	PFP	Clive D. Quiño
Camiguin		Xavier Jesus Romualdo	Lakas	Rodin M. Romualdo
Lanao del Norte		Mohamad Khalid Dimaporo	Lakas	Allan J. Lim
Misamis Occidental		Henry Oaminal	Nacionalista	Rowena Gutierrez
Misamis Oriental		Juliette Uy	NUP	Jeremy Pelaez

==== Cities ====
- † Regional center

City	Population (2024)	Area		Density		City class	Province
		km^{2}	sq mi	/km^{2}	/sq mi		
† Cagayan de Oro	741,617	412.80	159.38	1,800	4,700	Highly urbanized city	Misamis Oriental
El Salvador	62,126	106.15	40.98	590	1,500	Component	Misamis Oriental
Gingoog	138,895	568.44	219.48	240	620	Component	Misamis Oriental
Iligan	368,132	813.37	314.04	450	1,200	Highly urbanized city	Lanao del Norte
Malaybalay	195,046	969.19	374.21	200	520	Component	Bukidnon
Valencia	223,620	587.29	226.75	380	980	Component	Bukidnon
Oroquieta	71,373	237.88	91.85	300	780	Component	Misamis Occidental
Ozamiz	143,620	169.95	65.62	850	2,200	Component	Misamis Occidental
Tangub	68,419	162.78	62.85	420	1,100	Component	Misamis Occidental

== Demographics ==
Population census of Northern Mindanao
Year	Pop.	±% p.a.
1903	162,036	—
1918	273,415	+3.55%
1939	580,857	+3.65%
1948	772,322	+3.22%
1960	1,101,957	+3.01%
1970	1,611,228	+3.87%
1975	1,883,408	+3.18%
1980	2,226,169	+3.40%
1990	2,811,646	+2.36%
1995	3,197,059	+2.44%
2000	3,505,708	+2.00%
2007	3,952,437	+1.67%
2010	4,297,323	+3.09%
2015	4,689,302	+1.68%
2020	5,022,768	+1.46%
2024	5,178,326	+0.73%
Source: Philippine Statistics Authority

Northern Mindanao is the 9th most populous region in the Philippines and 3rd in Mindanao (after Bangsamoro and Davao Region) according to the 2024 Philippine Statistics Authority Census. The major urban area of Region X is Metro Cagayan de Oro which includes Cagayan de Oro and some municipalities and cities of Misamis Oriental and Bukidnon.

The vast majority of the region's inhabitants descended from migrants from Cebu, Bohol, Siquijor and Negros Oriental. Some other inhabitants are of Bicolano, Hiligaynon, Ilocano, Ivatan, Kapampangan, Pangasinan, Waray, Zamboangueño, and Tausug descent, while the autochthonous Bukidnons and Manobos populate the inner highlands.

The largest religion is Christianity, with Roman Catholicism forming 71.88% of the population and Protestants forming a significant minority of 6.03%. The second largest religion is Islam, forming 8.45% of the population.

The main language spoken in the region is Cebuano which is spoken with Northern Mindanao variant that is slightly different from standard Cebuano. The region is also home to sizeable speakers of Bohol dialect of Cebuano. Higaonon, Manobo and Binukid are among the languages native in the region, as are Also spoken varyingly in the region are Hiligaynon, Ilocano, Ivatan, Kapampangan and Waray.

== Economy ==
Poverty incidence of Northern Mindanao (%)

Source: Philippine Statistics Authority

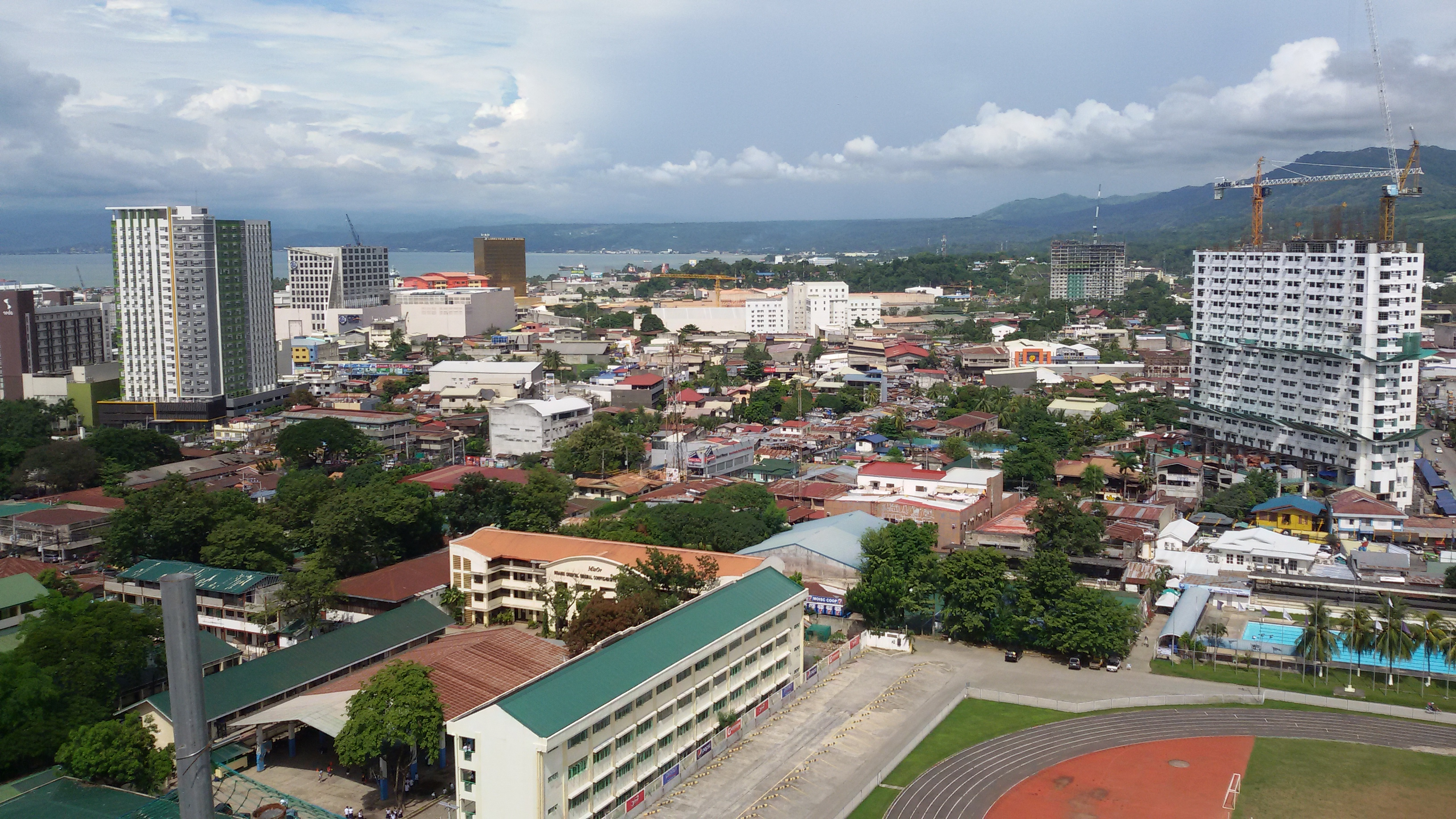
An aerial view of Cagayan de Oro as seen in August 2017

The economy of Northern Mindanao is the second largest regional economy in the island of Mindanao. While still a mainly agricultural region, there is also a booming growth of industries particularly in Cagayan de Oro and in Iligan. [Del Monte (company)|Del Monte Philippines]] is located in the province of Bukidnon and its processing plant is located in Cagayan de Oro, where it ships its products to the rest of the Philippines and Asia-Pacific region. The Agus-IV to VII Hydroelectric Plants in Iligan and Balo-i supply most of its electrical power in Mindanao.
