= Serangan =

Serangan may refer to:

- General Offensive of 1 March 1949 (Indonesian: Serangan Umum 1 Maret 1949), Indonesian military offensive during the Indonesian National Revolution
- Serangan Fajar, a 1982 film by Arifin C. Noer
- Serangan Island, a small island in Bali, Indonesia

== See also ==
- Sarangani (disambiguation)
