= Bagobo language =

The Bagobo language can refer to either of the following Austronesian languages spoken in Mindanao, Philippines:

- Giangan language, also referred to as Bagobo
- Tagabawa language, also referred to as Bagobo
