= Tasaday =

Philippine indigenous people

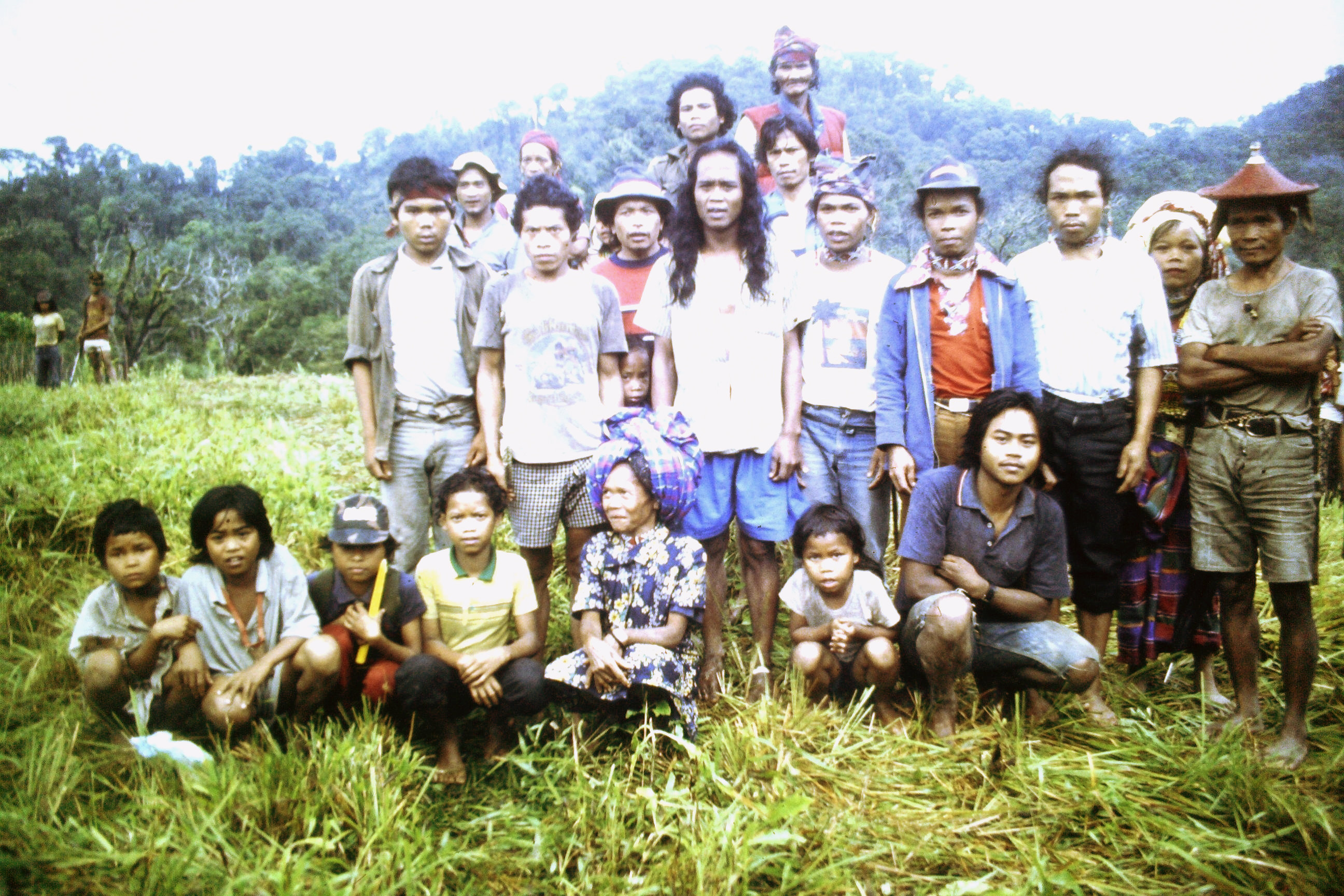
- The Tasaday people in their homeland, the last primal rainforest of Mindanao

Total population
- 216 (2008)

Regions with significant populations
- Philippines (Mindanao)

Languages
- Native; Tasaday dialect of Manobo; Also; Cebuano, Filipino, English

Religion
- Animism

Related ethnic groups
- Manobo people, other Lumad, Sama-Bajau, Moro, Visayans, other Filipino peoples, other Austronesian peoples

The Tasaday (tɑˈsɑdɑj) are an indigenous peoples of the Lake Sebu area in Mindanao, Philippines. They are considered to belong to the Lumad group, along with the other indigenous groups on the island. They attracted widespread media attention in 1971, when a journalist of the Manila Associated Press bureau chief reported their discovery, amid apparent "Stone Age" technology and in complete isolation from the rest of Philippine society. Multiple agencies were also contacted, such as National Geographic. They again attracted attention in the 1980s when some accused the Tasaday of living in the jungle and speaking in their dialect as being part of an elaborate hoax, and doubts were raised as to their isolation and nature as a separate ethnic group. The Tasaday language is distinct from that of neighboring tribes, and linguists believe it probably split from the adjacent Manobo languages 200 years ago.

== Background ==
Manuel Elizalde was the head of PANAMIN, the Philippine government agency created in 1968 to protect the interests of cultural minorities. He was the son of a wealthy father of Spanish lineage and an American mother. He was a known crony of the late Philippine dictator Marcos. He took credit for discovering the Tasaday, which he did on June 7, 1971, shortly after a local barefoot Blit hunter told him of a sporadic contact over the years with a handful of primitive forest dwellers. He released this to the media a month later, and many excited people began the long task of clearing the thickest forest in the world. Weeks later, visitors' way was blocked by PANAMIN guards who answered to Elizalde alone and allowed only a select group of the visitors to meet them.

=== Introduction of the Tasaday ===
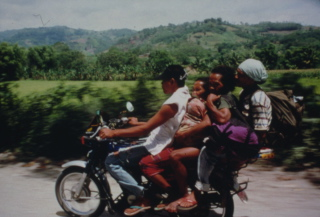
Tasadays riding on a motorbike

Elizalde brought the Tasaday to the attention of PANAMIN, which funded all efforts to find, visit, and study the Tasaday. With a small group including bodyguards, helicopter pilot, a doctor, and a local tribeswoman called Igna for interpreting attempts. Elizalde met the Tasaday in a pre-arranged clearing at the edge of the forest in June 1971.

In March 1972, another meeting occurred between the Tasaday, Elizalde, and members of the press and media including the Associated Press and the National Geographic Society, this time at the Tasaday's secluded cave home site. This meeting was popularly reported by Kenneth MacLeish in the August 1972 issue of National Geographic, which featured on its cover a photograph by photojournalist John Launois of a Tasaday boy climbing vines.

Since these first meetings and reports, the group was subject to a great deal of further publicity, including a National Geographic documentary, The Last Tribes of Mindanao (shown December 1, 1972). Visitors included Charles A. Lindbergh and Gina Lollobrigida.

=== Ban on visitation ===
In April 1972, President Ferdinand Marcos (at the behest of PANAMIN and Lindbergh) declared 19,000 acres (77 km^{2}) of land surrounding the Tasaday's ancestral caves as the Tasaday/Manobo Blit Preserve. By this time, eleven anthropologists had studied the Tasaday in the field, but none for more than six weeks, and in 1976, Marcos closed the preserve to all visitors. The reason was the martial law imposed on the country; outsiders were unwelcome as that put the Marcos regime under more scrutiny.

=== Elizalde's flight and return ===
In 1983, sometime after the assassination of Philippine opposition leader Benigno Aquino Jr., Elizalde fled the Philippines. It had been rumoured that he fled with and eventually squandered millions of dollars from a foundation set up to protect the Tasaday. It was also rumoured that Elizalde used the photos and other information he got from the Tasaday and Blit tribes for moneymaking businesses in various countries. It was reported that he amassed money amounting to US$100 million, which Elizalde denied.

Elizalde returned to the Philippines in 1987 and stayed until his death on May 3, 1997, of leukemia. From 1987 to 1990, Elizalde claimed he had spent more than one million U.S. dollars of Tasaday non-profit funds. During this time, Elizalde also founded the Tasaday Community Care Foundation, or TCCF.

== Controversy ==
After President Marcos was deposed in the 1986 People Power Revolution, Swiss anthropologist and journalist Oswald Iten, accompanied by Joey Lozano (a journalist from South Cotabato) and Datu Galang Tikaw (a member of the T'boli people as lead translator, despite not speaking Tasaday), made an unauthorized visit to the Tasaday caves where they spent about two hours with six Tasaday individuals.

Upon returning from the forest, Iten and Lozano reported the caves deserted and further claimed the Tasaday were simply members of other known local tribes who put on the appearance of living a Stone Age lifestyle under pressure from Elizalde. Many local tribesmen admitted to pretending to be Tasaday in order to gain funds, reputation, and other items.

In the mid-1990s, American linguist Lawrence A. Reid wrote that he spent 10 months with the Tasaday and surrounding linguistic groups (1993–1996) and has concluded that they "probably were as isolated as they claim, that they were indeed unfamiliar with agriculture, that their language was a different dialect from that spoken by the closest neighboring group, and that there was no hoax perpetrated by the original group that reported their existence." In his paper 'Linguistic Archaeology: Tracking down the Tasaday Language', Reid states that, although he originally thought that a Tasaday named Belayem was fabricating words, after a detailed analysis of the linguistic evidence he found that around 300 of Belayem's forms were actually used in Manobo languages of Kulaman Valley, a place Belayem had never visited. Reid concluded that the Tasaday's isolation "may have lasted for only a few generations, possibly no more than 150 years". He also mentions that a similar group was later found and confirmed to be living as hunter-gatherers without contact with other tribes.

The Tasaday were likely a separate group living as gatherers deep in the jungle, who were rarely in contact or trade with neighboring peoples, but probably were not a Stone Age culture.

=== Legacy ===
French philosopher Jean Baudrillard invokes the Tasaday controversy in his 1981 book Simulacra and Simulation to illustrate the phenomenon of simulation at play, where he argues that the Philippine government and scientists' return of the Tasaday to the forest was aimed at constructing "the simulation model for all conceivable Indians before ethnology" to preserve the "reality principle" of the discipline.
