= Ata Manobo language =

Austronesian language spoken in the Philippines

Ata
- Ata Manobo
- Native to: Philippines
- Region: Mindanao
- Ethnicity: 22,700 (2010 census)
- Native speakers: (27,000 cited 2000 census)
- Language family: Austronesian: Malayo-Polynesian; Philippine; Greater Central Philippine; Manobo; Central; South; Ata

Language codes
- ISO 639-3: atd
- Glottolog: atam1240

Ata (Ata of Davao, Atao Manobo, Langilan) is a Manobo language of northeastern Mindanao of the Philippines. It is spoken in northwest Davao del Norte province, southeast Bukidnon province, Davao de Oro province (northwest border), and Davao del Sur province (northwest enclave).

== Phonology ==
=== Consonants ===
		Labial	Alveolar	Palatal	Velar	Glottal
Nasal		m	n		ŋ	
Plosive	voiceless	p	t		k	ʔ
Plosive	voiced	b	d		ɡ	
Fricative			s			h
Lateral			l			
Approximant		w		j		

=== Vowels ===
	Front	Central	Back
Close	i		u
Mid			o
Open		a	
