= Manuel Elizalde =

Filipino businessman and civil servant (1936–1997)

Manuel "Manda" Cadwallader Elizalde Jr. (November 8, 1936 – May 3, 1997) was a Filipino entrepreneur. He was most known for claiming to discover a 'Stone-Age' tribe called the Tasadays which was later rumored as a hoax.

== Personal life ==
Elizalde was born in Manila on November 8, 1936, to Manuel "Manolo" Elizalde Sr. and Mary Cadwallader.

He was married, but the couple later divorced.

== Tasaday alleged hoax ==
In June 1971, Elizalde claimed to discover a primitive tribe untouched by civilization, who lived in caves and survived by hunting and gathering. The "Tasadays" were found in a forest in South Cotabato, Mindanao. The story gained traction in international media, some complimenting him as "a visionary idealist who cared more about the hard-pressed national minorities than about his family fortune".

However, all visits from foreign media and scholars were supervised by the Presidential Assistance on National Minorities (PANAMIN), which was led by Elizalde himself. Independent anthropologists were prohibited to enter the Tasaday reservation area, thus no scholarly papers were published on the Tasaday at that time.

It was only after the Marcos downfall that a Swiss journalist, Oswald Iten, entered the area and found the so-called Paleolithic tribe dressed in T-shirts and living in huts. Many other local and foreign anthropologists decried Elizalde's claims, calling it an elaborate hoax. Iten and journalist Joey Lozano reported the caves deserted and further claimed the Tasaday were simply members of other known local tribes who put on the appearance of living a Stone Age lifestyle under pressure from Elizalde. Many local tribesmen admitted to pretending to be Tasaday in order to gain funds, reputation, and other items.

== Other controversies ==
Elizalde was regarded as a crony of former president and dictator Ferdinand Marcos.

He and his brother Fred J. Elizalde became involved in many businesses, such as mining, abaca farming, sugar centrals, tinplate manufacturing, paints, foods, distillery, real estate, rural banking, and agri-business. They both came into conflict with many of his laborers due to exploitation of sugar workers, refusing to pay livable wages and bonuses, and oppression of cultural minorities.

Elizalde was the chief executive of several steel companies, which were favored and accommodated by the Marcos regime through funding and guaranteed access to lucrative markets. He monopolized sales of tinplate, and raised prices at will, which rippled in the market with price increases. In one instance, Elizalde raised the price for tinplate by 17% in 1980, and threatened to increase it with another 7.5% unless the government continued to charge tax on imported raw materials.

== Death ==
Elizalde died on May 3, 1997, of leukemia. His family did not disclose the cause of death.
