= Kagayanen language =

Austronesian language spoken in the Philippines

Kagayanen
- Native to: Philippines
- Region: eastern Palawan
- Native speakers: 30,000 (2007)
- Language family: Austronesian: Malayo-Polynesian; Philippine; Greater Central Philippine; Manobo; North; Kagayanen

Language codes
- ISO 639-3: cgc
- Glottolog: kaga1256

The Kagayanen language is spoken in the province of Palawan in the Philippines. It belongs to the Manobo subgroup of the Austronesian language family and is the only member of this subgroup that is not spoken on Mindanao or nearby islands.

== Distribution ==
Kagayanen is spoken in the following areas:

- Palawan Province: Cagayancillo Island between Negros and Palawan
- Palawan coastal communities
- southern Palawan: Balabac Island
- northern Palawan: Busuanga and Coron
- other areas around the Philippines: Iloilo Province; Silay, Negros; Manila; Quezon and Rizal areas

== Phonology ==
Kagayanen consonant phonemes
	Labial		Coronal		Palatal	Velar		Glottal
Nasal		m		n			ŋ	
Stop	p	b	t	d		k	g	ʔ
Fricative			s					(h)
Approximant (Lateral)				ð̞	j		w	
Approximant (Lateral)				l				
Rhotic				r				

[h] occurs only in loan words, proper names, or in words that have [h] in the cognates of neighboring languages. Outside of loanwords, /d/ becomes [r] between vowels.

Comparative and historical evidence suggests that /ð̞/ and /l/ were in complementary distribution before a split occurred likely with pressure from contact with English, Spanish, and Filipino.

Vowels of Kagayanen
	Front	Central	Back
Close	i	ə	u
Open		a	

/i/ ranges between [i] and [e], except in unstressed syllables (as well as before consonant clusters) where it lowers to [ɪ] or [ɛ]. Similarly, /u/ lowers to [ʊ] in unstressed syllables, before consonant clusters, and word-finally. It is otherwise [u].

== Grammar ==
Most roots in Kagayanen do not have a defined part of speech but can function in predication (like verbs), referring (like nouns), or modifying (like adjectives and adverbs). For example, kaan is a root often used to refer to "cooked rice", but when inflected as a verb, the same root can mean "eat". Verbs are inflected for mood, volition, voice (transitive/intransitive in Pebley's terminology), and whether the absolutive argument is a typical affected patient (applicative marking). As with other Austronesian languages, one argument of a verb is always treated specially by the syntax. Pebley refers to this unmarked noun phrase (which is often but not always in a patient role when another argument is present) simply as the "absolutive" argument. (Van Valin 2005) refers to this as the PSA, the "privileged syntactic argument", but linguists use a variety of terms to refer to this type of argument.
