= Bukid language =

Manobo language spoken in the Philippines

Bukid
- Binukid
- Native to: Philippines
- Region: most parts of Bukidnon province, Mindanao
- Native speakers: 168,234 (2010)
- Language family: Austronesian: Malayo-Polynesian; Philippine; Greater Central Philippine; Manobo; North; Bukid
- Dialects: Talaandig

Language codes
- ISO 639-3: bkd
- Glottolog: binu1244
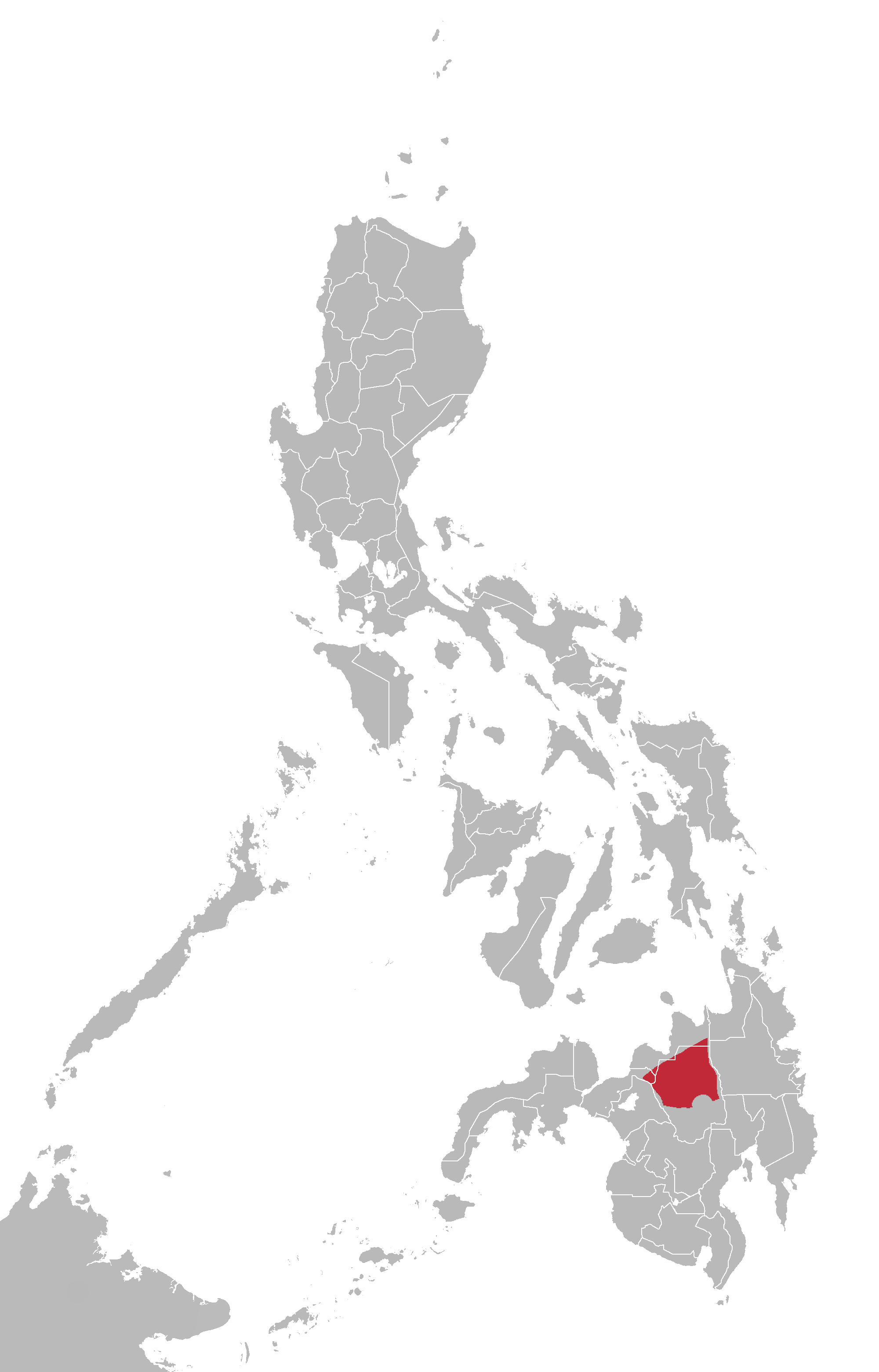
- Area where Binukid is spoken

The Bukid language, Binukid, Binokid or Bukidnon, is an Austronesian language spoken by indigenous peoples of Northern Mindanao in the southern Philippines. The word Bukid means 'mountain' or 'highland' while Binukid means 'in the manner, or style, of the mountain or highland'. In Bukidnon province, it is referred to as Higaonon.

== Distribution and dialects ==
Binukid is spoken in the north of the island Mindanao in southern Philippines; it is spoken in the following areas:

- central and northern Bukidnon Province
- northeastern Lanao del Norte Province
- Misamis Oriental Province: Cagayan de Oro area including southwest of Gingoog Bay
- very small border strip of Lanao del Sur

Binukid has many dialects, but there is mutual intelligibility. The dialect of Malaybalay, in the Pulangi area, is considered to be the prestige and standard variety.

== Phonology ==
Binukid consists of twenty segmental phonemes and one suprasegmental phoneme. The syllable is the basic unit of word structure, and each syllable consists of one vowel and one or two consonants only, arranged in the following patterns: CV, CVC and, in some instances, CCV (which is found mostly in Spanish loanwords). A word consists of one or more of these syllables.

=== Consonants ===
There are 16 consonants in Binukid. In some instances, there is a voiceless alveolo-palatal affricate [t͡ɕ] which appears in Spanish loanwords.

Binukid consonants
		Bilabial	Alveolar	Palatal	Velar	Glottal
Nasal		m	n		ŋ	
Stop	voiceless	p	t		k	ʔ
Stop	voiced	b	d		ɡ	
Fricative			s			h
Lateral			l			
Tap			ɾ			
Semivowel				j	w	

The phoneme [ɾ] is sometimes trilled which is used in intervocalic position or in Spanish loanwords by some speakers. All consonants except [h] are found in initial and final position in the syllable; [h] is found only syllable-initial.

=== Vowels ===
There are generally four vowels in Binukid.

Binukid vowels
	Front (unrounded)	Central (unrounded)	Back (rounded)
Close	i		u
Close-mid		ɘ	
Open		ä	

=== Suprasegmentals ===
There is a suprasegmental phoneme of stress which usually falls on the penultimate syllable. Stress give contrast to words of the same segmental phonemes; for example beleng [ˈbɘlɘŋ] means 'surprise' while beléng [bɘˈlɘŋ] means 'drunk'. Long words may have more than one stress: balángkawítan [bäˌläŋkaˈwitän] 'rooster'. Stress commonly shifts when suffixes are added to the word (as in kahibeléngan 'mysterious') or when the speaker wishes to emphasize the word.

== Grammar ==
=== Pronouns ===
The following set of pronouns are the pronouns found in the Bukid language. The /d/-final allomorphs of the vowel-final NOM or GEN pronouns are used almost exclusively before en ('already'), a bound adverbial.

Binukid pronouns
	NOM or GEN free	NOM bound	GEN bound	OBL free or bound
1st person singular	siak	a(d)	ku(d)	kanak
2nd person singular	sikaw	ka(d)	nu(d)	ikaw
3rd person singular	Ø	Ø	din	kandin
1st person dual	sikit	ki(d)	ta(d)	kanit
1st person plural inclusive	sikuy	kuy	taw	kanuy
1st person plural exclusive	sikay	kay	day	kanay
2nd person plural	sinyu	kaw	nuy	inyu
3rd person plural	siran	siran	dan	kandan

== Writing system and orthography ==
The Latin script is used in writing the language. In the dictionary by the LSP and SIL (1992:x–xi), the alphabet employed consists of the following letters which correspond to one phoneme. Word-initial and word-final glottal stops are not written but glottal stops following a consonant is marked by a hyphen. Example: hab-ung [ˈhäbʔuŋ] 'mildew'. The phoneme [ŋ] is represented by a digraph ⟨ng⟩, which is sometimes considered a separate letter.

Letter	Aa	Bb	Kk	Dd	Ee	Gg	Hh	Ii	Ll	Mm	Nn	Pp	Rr	Ss	Tt	Uu	Ww	Yy
Phoneme	ä	b	k	d	ɘ	g	h	i	l	m	n	p	ɾ	s	t	u	w	j

Other letters, such as c, f, j, q, and z, are used in proper nouns or loanwords that have not had their spellings altered.

Suprasegmental phonemes and glottalization are featured in writing Binukid. (Note: see, for example, LSP and SIL (1992:x–xi) and Peng (2008)) Stress can be indicated by an acute accent ⟨′⟩. A grave accent ⟨`⟩ can be marked over syllable- or word-final vowel to indicate a following glottal stop. If stress is shown on the final letter and there is a following glottal stop, a circumflex accent ⟨ˆ⟩ can be used. There is no marking for words whose stress falls on the penultimate syllable and without a secondary stress.

Examples:

- sala [ˈsälä] 'living room'
- salà [ˈsäläʔ] 'small cut'
- salâ [säˈläʔ] 'sin'
- pahid [ˈpähid] 'to wipe'
- pahíd [päˈhid] 'shrub'
- balángkawítan [bäˌläŋkaˈwitän] 'rooster'
- talètè [täˈlɘʔtɘʔ] 'lizard'

The plural particle marker manga is written mga, following accepted Philippine usage.
