= Sarangani (disambiguation) =

Sarangani is a province in the Philippines in southern Mindanao.

It may also refer to:

- Sarangani Bay
- Sarangani, Davao Occidental, a municipality in the Philippines
  - Sarangani Islands, the group of islands comprising the municipality
    - Sarangani Island, one of the islands in the Saranganis
- Sarangani Island, more popularly known as Limasawa Island, Southern Leyte, Philippines
- Sarangani language
