= Agusan language =

Austronesian language spoken in the Philippines

Agusan
- Native to: Philippines
- Region: Mindanao
- Native speakers: (80,000 cited 1978–2002)
- Language family: Austronesian: Malayo-Polynesian; Philippine; Greater Central Philippine; Manobo; Central; Agusan

Language codes
- ISO 639-3: Variously: msm – Agusan, Omayamnon mbd – Dibabawon mqk – Rajah Kabunsuwan
- Glottolog: east2478

Agusan is a Manobo language of northeastern Mindanao in the Philippines.

== Distribution and dialects ==
Agusan Manobo (consisting of the Umayam, Adgawan, Surigao, and Omayamnon dialects) is spoken in the following areas.

- Agusan del Sur Province: western area, southeast of Lake Buluan
- inland areas of Surigao del Sur Province
- southwest of Lanuza Peninsula to Lianga Bay in Surigao del Sur Province
- western Agusan del Norte Province
- Davao de Oro and Davao del Norte provinces: continuous strip along northern borders
- Surigao del Norte Province: southern tip, inland
- scattered small border areas of Bukidnon and Davao Oriental provinces

Dibabawon Manobo is spoken in the following areas.

- northern Davao de Oro Province: upper Agusan River area
- Davao Oriental Province: Boston and Cateel municipalities
- Davao del Norte Province: Asuncion municipality (in Manguagan)

Rajah Kabunsuwan Manobo is spoken in the following areas.

- northern border of Davao Oriental Province
- southeast corner of Agusan del Sur Province
- southern Surigao del Sur Province: Lingig (in Rajah Cabungsuan)

The Omayamnon, Dibabawon, and Rajah Kabunsuwan dialects are divergent.

== Phonology ==
=== Consonants ===
In Agusan, the stops have unreleased variants when occurring before another consonant, silence, and in syllable-final position. The glottal stop /ʔ/ occurs in all consonant positions. Of the continuants, all occur in syllable-initial position and all except /h/ in word-final position. The consonants /d/ and /j/ are used interchangeably.

Agusan Manobo consonants
	Bilabial	Alveolar	Palatal	Velar	Glottal
Plosive	p b	t d		k g	ʔ
Nasal	m	n		ŋ	
Fricative		s			h
Flap		ɾ			
Approximant	w	l	j		

=== Vowels ===
Agusan has only five vowels, /i/, /u/, /e/, /æ/, and /a/. Vowels may appear alone, after a consonant, or between consonants in a syllable. All vowels, with the exception of /æ/, may occur "in a sequence of identical vowels separated by a glottal stop". The vowel /e/ never occurs next to the consonant /r/.

Agusan Manobo vowels
	Front	Central	Back
High	i		u
Mid	e		
Low	æ	a	
