= PANAMIN =

Filipino nonprofit organization

PANAMIN, also Panamin or Panamin Foundation, was the nonstock, nonprofit organization created to protect the interests of Philippine cultural minorities. Headed and mainly funded by Manuel Elizalde, Jr., eldest son of a Filipino millionaire, but sometimes funded by the Philippine government under President Ferdinand Marcos, PANAMIN means Presidential Assistant on National Minorities. Established in 1968, the organization dissolved in 1983 when Elizalde fled the Philippines. Elizalde is considered a crony of Marcos.

PANAMIN has been accused of representing the interest of economic enterprises that aimed to exploit natural resources on ancestral lands. The organization forced thousands of indigenous peoples into "strategic hamlets," supposedly to protect them from armed conflict. A report by Human Rights Watch, however, said that the displacement was intended to allow Elizalde to conduct logging and mining operations. PANAMIN also recruited indigenous peoples to join paramilitary groups to divide and harass indigenous communities.

Charles Lindbergh served on PANAMIN's board of directors and visited many of the Philippines' indigenous peoples with Elizalde.

== See also ==
- Tasaday
