= Manobo languages =

Subgroup of the Austronesian language family

Manobo
- Geographic distribution: Central Mindanao
- Linguistic classification: Austronesian: Malayo-Polynesian; Philippine; Greater Central Philippine; Manobo
- Subdivisions: Central; North; West

Language codes
- ISO 639-2 / 5: mno
- Glottolog: mano1276
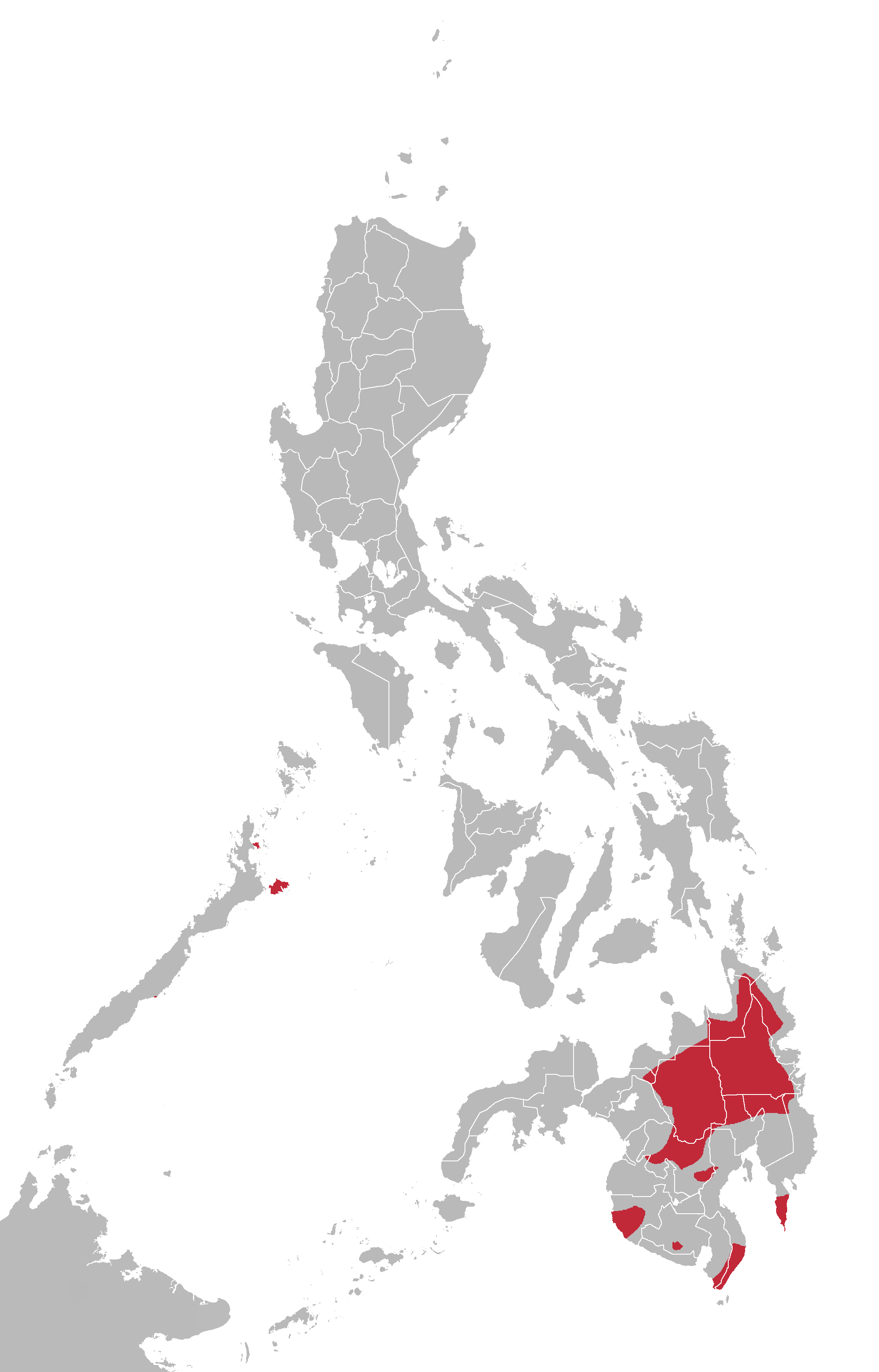
- Geographic extent of Manobo languages based on Ethnologue maps

The Manobo languages are a group of languages spoken in the Philippines. Their speakers are primarily located around Northern Mindanao, Central Mindanao (presently called Soccsksargen) and Caraga regions where they are natively spoken. Some outlying groups make Manobo geographically discontiguous as other speakers can be located as far as the southern peninsula of Davao Oriental, most of Davao Occidental and coastal areas of Sultan Kudarat. The Kagayanen speakers are the most extremely remote and can be found in certain portions of Palawan.

== Languages ==
- Central
  - East: Dibabawon, Rajah Kabunsuwan, Agusan
  - South: Ata, Matigsalug (Tigwa); Obo
  - West: Western Bukidnon, Ilianen
- North: Binukid, Kagayanen, Higaonon, Kinamigin
- South: Tagabawa, Sarangani, Cotabato

== Classification ==
Elkins (1974:637) classifies the Manobo languages as follows.

- Manobo
  - Northern
    - Cagayano (of Cagayancillo Island)
    - Kinamigin (of Camiguin Island), Binukid (of central Mindanao)
    - Southern
      - Tagabawa
      - Sarangani Manobo
      - Tasaday, Cotabato Manobo
    - East-West-Central
      - Western
        - Obo
        - Ilianen Manobo
        - Western Bukidnon Manobo, Livunganen (a dialect spoken in Libungan, north of Midsayap, Cotabato)
      - East-Central
        - Eastern
          - Agusan Manobo
          - Dibabawon Manobo
        - Central
          - Ata of Davao
          - Matig Salug, Tigwa Manobo

== Reconstruction ==
Proto-Manobo
- Reconstruction of: Manobo languages
- Reconstructed ancestors: Proto-Austronesian: Proto-Malayo-Polynesian; Proto-Philippine

Elkins (1974) includes a reconstruction of Proto-Manobo, along with 197 reconstructed etyma.

The Proto-Manobo phonemes are (Elkins 1974:616):

Consonants

*p	*t	*k	*ʔ
*b	*d	*g	
*m	*n	*ŋ	
	*l		
	*r		
	*s		*h
*w	*y		

Vowels

*i	*u
*e	
*a	

== See also ==
- Lumad people
