= Western Bukidnon Manobo =

Austronesian language spoken in the Philippines

- Native to: Philippines
- Region: mostly in southwestern portions of Northern Mindanao region, Mindanao
- Native speakers: 15,000 (2008)
- Language family: Austronesian: Malayo-Polynesian; Philippine; Greater Central Philippine; Manobo; Central; West; Western Bukidnon Manobo

Language codes
- ISO 639-3: mbb
- Glottolog: west2555
- ELP: Western Bukidnon Manobo

Western Bukidnon Manobo is a Manobo language of Mindanao in the Philippines.

== Distribution and dialects ==
Western Bukidnon Manobo is spoken in the following locations:

- Southern Bukidnon Province: Dangcagan, Don Carlos, Kitaotao, and especially Maramag municipalities
- Cotabato Province: Banisilan municipality

Its dialects are Ilentungen, Kiriyenteken, and Pulangiyen.
