= Cotabato Manobo language =

Austronesian language spoken in the Philippines

Cotabato Manobo
- Region: Sultan Kudarat, Mindanao, the Philippines
- Native speakers: 30,000 (2007)
- Language family: Austronesian: Malayo-Polynesian; Philippine; Greater Central Philippine; Manobo; South; Cotabato Manobo
- Dialects: Tasaday; Blit

Language codes
- ISO 639-3: mta
- Glottolog: cota1241

Cotabato Manobo (Dulangan Manobo) is a Manobo language spoken in Mindanao, the Philippines. Dialects include Tasaday and Blit.

== Distribution ==
Cotabato Manobo is spoken in the Kalamansig, Palimbang, and Ninoy Aquino municipalities of Sultan Kudarat Province and the T'Boli municipality of South Cotabato Province.

== Phonology ==
=== Vowels ===
Cotabato Manobo vowels
	Front	Central	Back
Close	i		u
Mid	ɛ	ə	ɔ
Open-mid	ɛ	a	ɔ
Open		a	ɔ

- /i u/ are realized as [ɪ ʊ] in closed syllables.
- /ɛ/ is realized as [e] when it is preceded by /k/ and in an open syllable.
- /a/ is realized as [ɜ] when it is followed by /h/ or /ʔ/.
- /ɔ/ is realized as [ɒ] when it is followed by /h/, /ʔ/, or /ɡ/, or when word-initial and followed by /k/. For some speakers it may also be realized as [ɒ] before or after /k/ when not word-initial.

=== Consonants ===
Cotabato Manobo consonants
		Labial	Coronal	Dorsal	Glottal
Nasal		m	n	ŋ	
Plosive	voiced	b	d	ɡ	
Plosive	voiceless		t	k	ʔ
Fricative		ɸ	s		h
Approximant		w	l	j	

== See also ==
- Lumad
