= Matigsalug language =

Austronesian language spoken in the Philippines

Matigsalug
- Matig-Salug Manobo
- Tigwa
- Native to: Philippines
- Region: southern parts of Bukidnon province, Mindanao
- Native speakers: 50,000 (2010)
- Language family: Austronesian: Malayo-Polynesian; Philippine; Greater Central Philippine; Manobo; Central; South; Matigsalug
- Dialects: Kulamanen; Tigwa; Tala Ingod; Matig-Salug

Language codes
- ISO 639-3: mbt
- Glottolog: mati1250

Matigsalug (Matig-Salug Manobo) is a Manobo language of Mindanao in the Philippines. It belongs to the Austronesian language family.

== Distribution and dialects ==
There are approximately at least 50,000 speakers of the language, most of whom are concentrated in Mindanao, notably in south central Bukidnon, northeastern Cotabato and northwestern Davao del Sur provinces. A total of 5,000 monolingual speakers of the language has been reported.

Matigsalug can be divided into four major dialects: Kulamanen, Tigwa, Tala Ingod, and Matigsalug Proper. Dialects are divergent, such that Tigwa has marginal intelligibility of Matigsalug, and only Tala Ingod may have adequate intelligibility of Matigsalug.

== Writing system ==
Matigsalug is typically written using eighteen graphemes: a, b, d, e, g, h, i, k, l, m, n, p, r, s, t, u, w, and y. The graphemes c, f, j, o, q, v, x, and z are used in recently borrowed words and the names of people and places. The glottal stop is represented by a hyphen when it occurs word medially, but not where it occurs intervocalically. For example, the word [manʔʌʔ] 'again' is written as man-e, while the word [tiʔaŋ] 'carry on the shoulder' is written as tiang.

== Phonology ==
=== Vowels ===
Matigsalug has four vowels: /i, ʌ, a, u/.

Long vowels do occur in Matigsalug, albeit rarely. The orthographic convention for long vowels is to write two vowel segments. For example, the word [pa:n] 'bread' is written as paan. This is in contrast with the spelling convention of most other Philippine languages, where sequences of identical vowels are separated by a glottal stop, e.g. Tagalog saan ([sa'ʔan]).

=== Consonants ===
There are 14 Matigsalug consonants. All the stops are unaspirated. The velar nasal occurs in all positions including at the beginning of a word.

Matigsalug consonant phonemes
	Bilabial		Alveolar /Dental		Post-al. /Palatal	Velar		Glottal
Nasal		m		n			ŋ	
Stop	p	b	t	d		k	g	ʔ
Fricative			s					h
Approximant				l	j		w	

=== Stress ===
Stress in Matigsalug always occurs penultimately, that is, on the second-to-last vowel. Because it is completely predictable, stress is not marked orthographically.

Matigsalug does have small one-syllable clitics. When these phonologically join to the previous word, they cause the stress to shift in order to maintain penultimate stress. For example, the word for 'father' is ámey; when the possessive determiner rin 'his/her' is added, the stress shifts to the second syllable of the word for 'father': améy rin.

== Morphosyntax ==
=== Noun phrases ===
Nouns are preceded by a case marker. There are three types of case markers in Matigsalug.

First, similar to the better-studied ang-marking in Tagalog, the language also employs a case-marking reserved for the noun with which the verb agrees (via focus/voice morphology). This marker exhibits allomorphy depending on whether the noun is a proper noun or a common noun. Si is the allomorph used when the noun is a proper noun or a kinship term; ka is used when the noun is a common noun or a possessive noun phrase.

si Inday/Anggam
Focus Inday/uncle
'Inday/Uncle'

ka {tirè/geyinawa rin}
Focus {sugar cane/breath his}
'the sugar cane/his breath'

Second, when the verb shows agreement with any other noun other than the agent/experiencer, the agent/experiencer is marked with a separate case marking. In other words, this would be comparable with the by-phrase in an English passive. This case marking also exhibits allomorphy depending on whether the agent/experiencer is a proper or a common noun. Ni is the allomorph used when the noun is a proper noun or a kinship term; te is used when the noun is a common noun or a possessive noun phrase.

ni Inday/Anggam
NonFocus(Ag) Inday/uncle
'by Inday/uncle'

te lukes
NonFocus(Ag) man
'by the man'

Lastly, there is case marking reserved for non-focused non-agent/experiencer roles in the clause. This case marking also exhibits allomorphy depending on whether the agent/experiencer is a proper or a common noun. Ki is the allomorph used when the noun is a proper noun or a kinship term; te is used when the noun is a common noun or a possessive noun phrase.

ki Inday/Anggam
NonFocus Inday/uncle
'to/from Inday/uncle'

te lukes
NonFocus man
'to/from the man'

=== Focus/voice morphology ===
Characteristic of Philippine-type languages, Matigsalug verbs carry what is known in the literature as focus morphology. This piece of morphology indicates the semantic roles of the participants in the clause with respect to the verb. Matigsalug can put the agent/experiencer (AF), goal (GF), location (LF), and instrument (IF) into direct focus.

In the first example, the prefix eg- indicates that the ka-marked noun functions as the agent, that is, the entity doing the kicking. In the second example, the prefix eg- in combination with the suffix -en together indicate that the ka-marked noun is the goal, that is, the entity being kicked.

Egsipè ka kuddè te kuddè
NonPast-kick-Agent Focus horse NonFocus child
'The horse kicks the child'

Egsipeen ka kuddè te kuddè
NonPast-kick-Agent Focus horse NonFocus(Ag) child
'The child kicks the horse'

== Sources ==
- Wang, P.; Hunt, R.; McGriff, J.; Elkins, R. E. (2006). The Grammar of Matigsalug Manobo. Manila: Summer Institute of Linguistics. ISBN 978-971-18-0407-7.
