= Kamigin language =

Manobo language spoken in the Philippines

Kamigin
- Kinamigin
- Native to: Philippines
- Region: Camiguin
- Native speakers: (27,000 cited 2000 census)
- Language family: Austronesian: Malayo-Polynesian; Philippine; Greater Central Philippine; Manobo; North; Kamigin

Language codes
- ISO 639-3: mkx
- Glottolog: cina1236

The Kamigin language, Kinamigin (Quinamiguin) is a Manobo language spoken on the island of Camiguin in the Philippines. It is declining as most inhabitants have shifted to Cebuano.

== Grammar ==
Ethnologue lists the following grammatical features for Kinamiging.

- VOS, VSO word order
- prepositions
- genitives after noun heads
- articles, adjectives, and numerals before noun heads
- relatives after noun heads
- question word in sentence-initial position
- word order distinguishes subjects, objects and indirect objects in some structures, word order distinguishes given and new information, topic and comment
- affixes do not indicate case of noun phrases
- verb affixes mark number
- passives
- causatives
- comparatives
