= Obo language =

Austronesian language spoken in the Philippines

Obo
- Obo Manobo
- Native to: Philippines
- Region: eastern portions of Cotabato province, Mindanao
- Native speakers: 60,000 (2007)
- Language family: Austronesian: Malayo-Polynesian; Philippine; Greater Central Philippine; Manobo; Central; South; Obo

Language codes
- ISO 639-3: obo
- Glottolog: obom1235

Obo is a Manobo language spoken around Mount Apo on the island of Mindanao in the Philippines.

== Phonology ==
=== Consonants ===
		Labial	Alveolar	Palatal	Velar	Glottal
Nasal		m	n		ŋ	
Plosive	voiceless	p	t		k	ʔ
Plosive	voiced	b	d		ɡ	
Fricative		v	s			h
Flap			ɾ			
Lateral			l			
Approximant		w		j		

=== Vowels ===
	Front	Central	Back
Close	i		u
Mid	e		ɔ
Open		ɐ	
