= Higaonon language =

Austronesian language spoken in the Philippines

Higaonon
- Misamis Higaonon Manobo
- Native to: Philippines
- Region: Misamis Oriental, western portions of Agusan del Norte, northwestern portions of Agusan del Sur and northern portions of Bukidnon in Mindanao
- Native speakers: 452,000 (2026)
- Language family: Austronesian: Malayo-Polynesian; Philippine; Greater Central Philippine; Manobo; North; Higaonon

Language codes
- ISO 639-3: mba
- Glottolog: higa1237

Higaonon is a Manobo language spoken by the Higaonon people on the island of Mindanao in the Philippines. It is partially intelligible with Binukid.

== Region ==
Higaonon is spoken in the Butuan River basin of north-central Mindanao, comprising the entire Misamis Oriental, northern parts of Bukidnon, northwestern Agusan del Sur Province and the area of Agusan del Norte Province south of Butuan. According to Ethnologue, it is closely related to Binukid, with 77%–81% mutual intelligibility.

The name Higaonon comes from the words higa "to live" + gaon "mountain" + onon "people" — the literal meaning is "the mountain-dwellers."

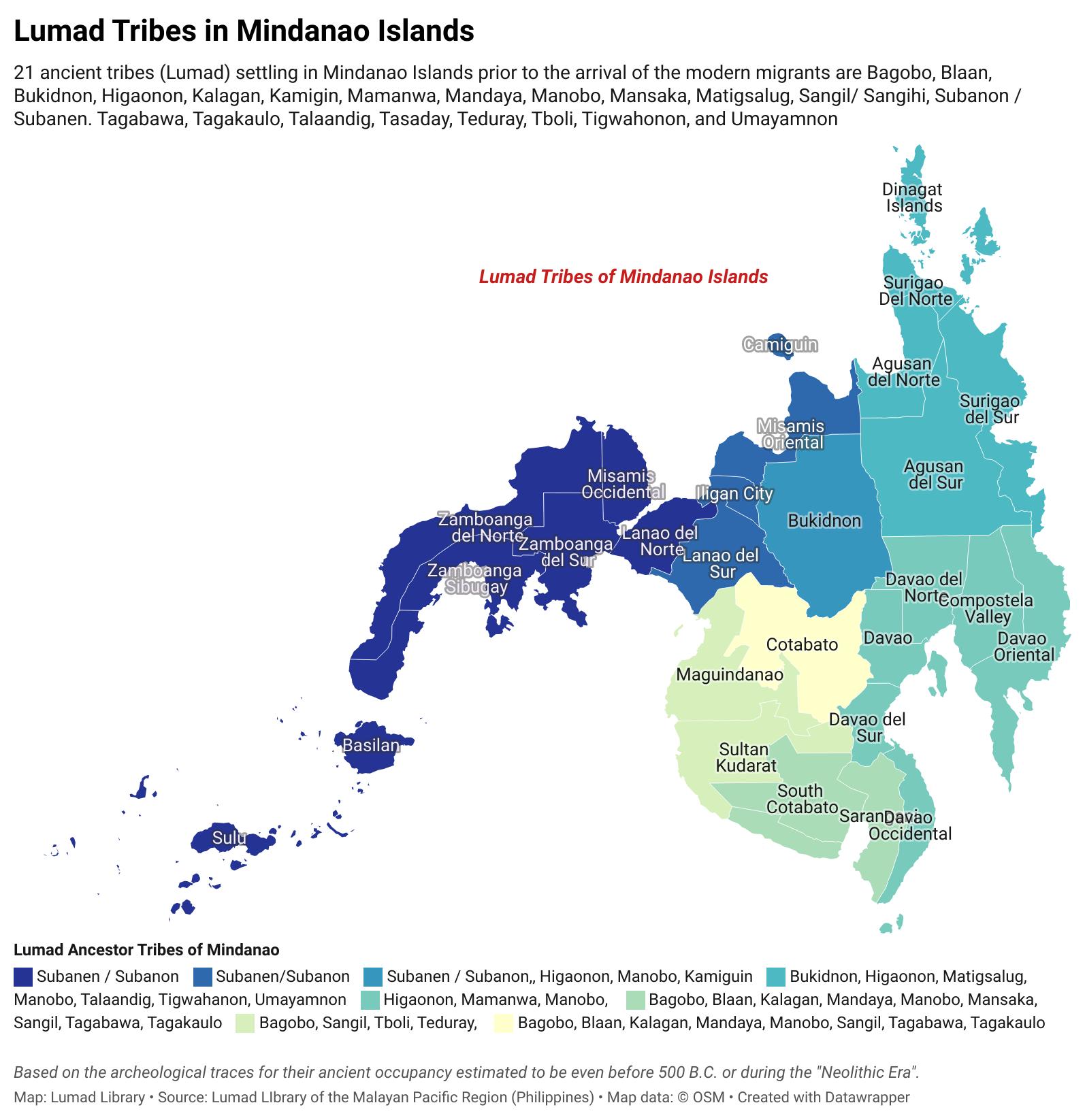
Map of 21 ancient tribes settling in Mindanao island prior to the arrival of the modern migrants. Higaonon is light blue in the northeastern area.

== Status ==
Higaonon's status has been deemed stable, although there are some threats to its future longevity. Migrants to their native region, urbanization, and the increasing prevalence of Tagalog, Cebuano, and English contribute to its possible decline.

As of 2023, the Komisyon sa Wikang Filipino has been working on a writing system for Higaonon. In 2025, a mobile dictionary app was developed to encourage knowledge of Higaonon among youth in the Philippines. A survey conducted on young adult heritage speakers of Higaonon found that 100% agree that the language needs to be preserved, but opinions were more mixed on as to why, as well as the ease of learning it.

== Phonology ==
=== Consonants ===
		Bilabial	Dental	Palatal	Velar	Glottal
Nasal		m	n		ŋ	
Stop	voiceless	p	t		k	ʔ
Stop	voiced	b	d		ɡ	
Fricative			s			h
Approximant			l	j	w	
Rhotic			ɾ			

The glottal fricative /h/ and the tap /ɾ/ can only appear in the onset of a syllable. The dental series of consonants is notably not alveolar.

=== Vowels ===
	Front	Central	Back
Close	i		u
Mid		ə	o
Open		a	

Higaonon has five phonemic vowels. The high, unrounded front /i/ has an allophone, [e], that appears only in open syllables. Four diphthongs are also present: /aj/, /uj/, /aw/, and /əw/. For some dialects, /u/ is in free variation with /o/.

=== Stress ===
Lexical stress is phonemic in Higaonon, meaning it can distinguish meaning. The minimal pair [‘sa.la] "punishment" and [sa.’la] "sin" illustrate this; for "punishment" the stress is word-initial and for "sin" the stress is word-final. Stress prefers to be on the final or penultimate syllable of a word.

== Syntax ==
=== Word classes ===
Higaonon's nouns, verbs, adjectives, and adverbs are generally considered open classes, meaning they can take in neologisms.

==== Nouns ====
Nouns can be formed through affixation of -an, pag-, or ka- (which attach to a verb to form a verbal noun) or ting- and the circumfix ka-...-an (which attach to nouns to form related new nouns).

Noun-creating affixes
Usage	Affix	Root	Noun	Gloss (noun)
Attaches to a verb	-an	alo alo	alo aloan	toy
Attaches to a verb	pag-	limbay	paglimbay	singing
Attaches to a verb	ka-	alo alo	kaalo alo	playmate
Attaches to a noun	ting-	lati	tinglati	summertime
Attaches to a noun	ka-...-an	wahig	kawahigan	waters

Nouns are typically preceded by nominal markers that correspond to the number and focus of the noun.

Nominal markers	Usage	Notes
su, si, sidan ki	Focus marker	
hu, hi, hay	Non-focus marker	
ta, ki	Oblique marker	Used for indirect objects
manga	Plural marker	Used after one of the other markers

An example of a focused plural noun phrase is given below, where the two nominal markers are both employed:

Suminayaw su manga bata gabia
PERF.dance FOC PL child yesterday
‘The children danced yesterday.’

== Numbers ==
Higaonon has a decimal number system, given below.

Higaonon numbers 1-10
Number	Higaonon
1	[sə'buwə]
2	[də'duwə]
3	[tə'tulu]
4	[hə'ʔepat]
5	[lə'li.ma]
6	[hə'ʔenem]
7	['pi.tu]
8	['wa.lu]
9	['si.yam]
10	[sam'peleʔ]
