= Ilianen language =

Austronesian language spoken in the Philippines

Ilianen
- Ilianen Manobo
- Native to: Philippines
- Region: Mindanao
- Native speakers: (15,000 cited 2000)
- Language family: Austronesian: Malayo-Polynesian; Philippine; Greater Central Philippine; Manobo; Central; West; Ilianen

Language codes
- ISO 639-3: mbi
- Glottolog: ilia1236

Ilianen is a Manobo language of Mindanao in the Philippines.

== Distribution and dialects ==
Ilianen is spoken in the following areas:

- North Cotabato Province: north and central watershed of the Mindanao River
- Bukidnon Province: Kadingilan, Kibawe, and Damulog municipalities
- Maguindanao del Norte: northern tip of Northern Kabuntalan municipality
- Maguindanao del Sur: northern tip of Datu Montawal municipality

Its dialects are Arakan, Livunganen, and Pulangiyan.

== Phonology ==
=== Consonants ===
		Labial	Alveolar	Palatal	Velar	Glottal
Nasal		m	n		ŋ	
Plosive	voiceless	p	t		k	ʔ
Plosive	voiced	b	d		ɡ	
Fricative		β	s			h
Trill			r			
Lateral			l			
Approximant		w		j		

/r/ can be heard as a flap [ɾ] or a trill [r].

=== Vowels ===
	Front	Central	Back
Close	i		u
Mid		ə	
Open		a	

/ə/ can be heard as a long, back [ɯː], in syllable-final positions.
