= Tagabawa language =

Austronesian language spoken in the Philippines

Tagabawa
- Native to: Philippines
- Region: Mindanao
- Native speakers: (43,000 cited 1998)
- Language family: Austronesian: Malayo-Polynesian; Philippine; Greater Central Philippine; Manobo; Southern; Tagabawa

Language codes
- ISO 639-3: bgs
- Glottolog: taga1272
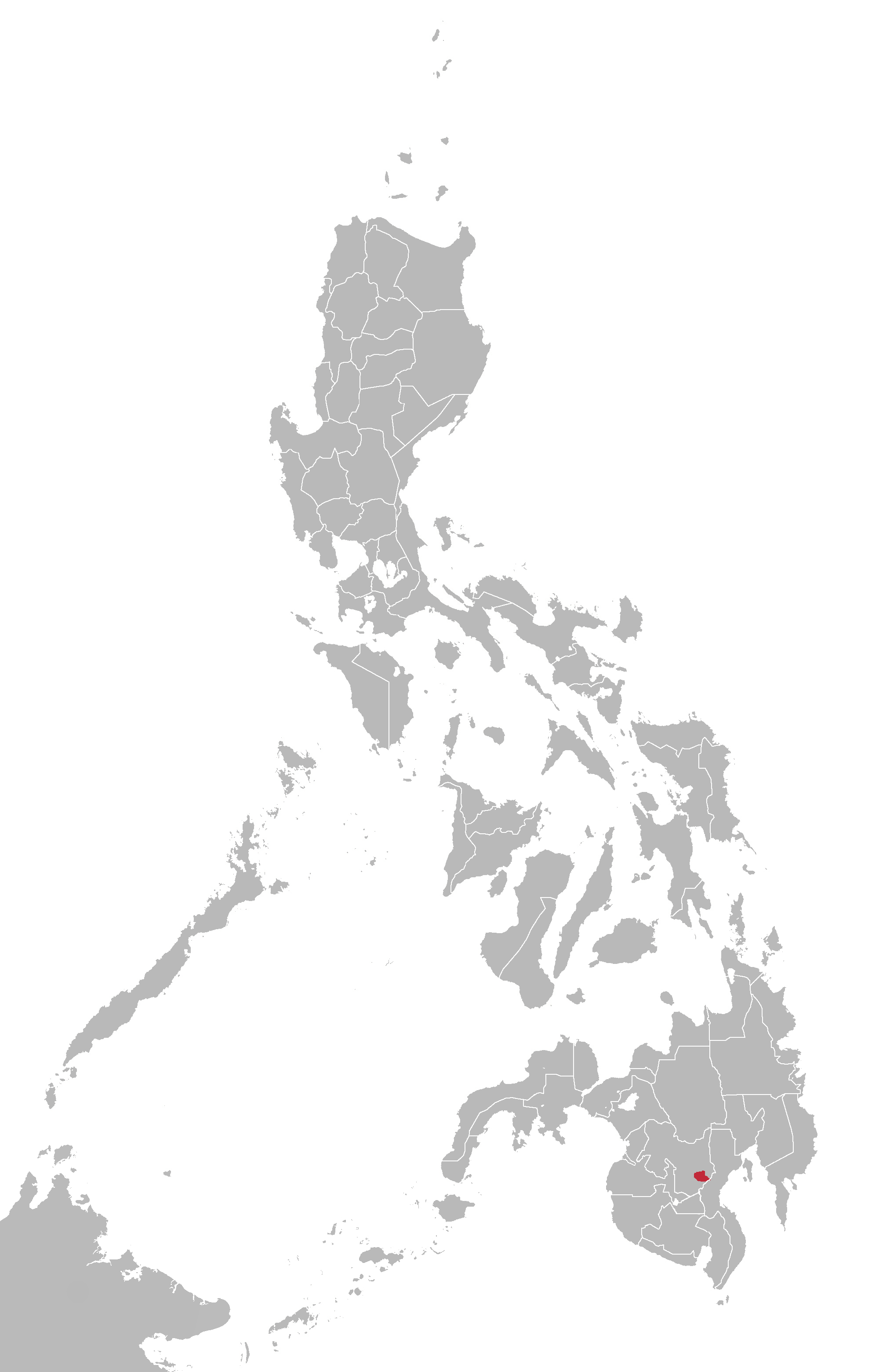
- Area where Tagabawa is spoken according to Ethnologue

Tagabawa is a Manobo language of Davao City and Mount Apo in Mindanao, the Philippines. Tagabawa is spoken in Cotabato and Davao del Sur provinces, and on the slopes of Mount Apo west of Davao City, The language is spoken by the Bagobo Tagabawa people.

== Phonology ==
=== Consonants ===
		Labial	Alveolar	Palatal	Velar	Glottal
Nasal		m	n		ŋ	
Plosive	voiceless	p	t		k	ʔ
Plosive	voiced	b	d		ɡ	ʔ
Fricative			s			h
Rhotic			ɾ			
Lateral			l			
Approximant		w		j		

- Sounds /p, t, k, ʔ/ are heard as unreleased [p̚, t̚, k̚, ʔ̚] when in word-final position.

=== Vowels ===
	Front	Central	Back
Close	i		
Mid	e	ə	o
Open		a	ɔ

- /e/ is heard as [ɛ] in close syllables.
