= Sarangani language =

Austronesian language spoken in the Philippines

Sarangani
- Sarangani Manobo
- Native to: Philippines
- Region: Mindanao
- Native speakers: (58,000 cited 2000 census)
- Language family: Austronesian: Malayo-Polynesian; Philippine; Greater Central Philippine; Manobo; Southern; Sarangani

Language codes
- ISO 639-3: mbs
- Glottolog: sara1327

Sarangani is a Manobo language of the Davao Region of Mindanao in the Philippines.

== Distribution ==
Sarangani Manobo is spoken in the Davao Region of southern Mindanao, Philippines. Specifically, it is spoken in Jose Abad Santos, Davao Occidental; Governor Generoso, Davao Oriental; and Glan, Sarangani.

== Phonology ==
=== Consonants ===
		Labial	Alveolar	Palatal	Velar	Glottal
Nasal		m	n		ŋ	
Plosive	voiceless	p	t		k	ʔ
Plosive	voiced	b	d		ɡ	
Fricative			s			h
Lateral			l			
Approximant		w		j		

=== Vowels ===
	Front	Central	Back
Close	i	ɨ	
Mid		ə	o
Open		a	

== Sources ==
- DuBois, Carl D. (1976). Sarangani Manobo: An Introductory Guide. Manila: Philippine Journal of Linguistics.
