= Whang-od Academy =

Planned paid online course

- Type: Online course
- Discontinued: August 4, 2021
- Platform: Nas Academy (Web)
- Status: Inactive
- Pricing model: Paid service
- Website: nasacademy.com/ph/whang-od/ancient-art-of-tattooing (archived)

Whang-od Academy, also known as Learn the Ancient Art of Tattooing, was a planned paid online course on traditional tattooing featuring Filipino Kalinga tattoo artist Whang-od. It was planned to be hosted at Nas Academy, an online education platform by video blogger Nuseir Yassin who is also known as Nas Daily.

Nas Daily was subject to controversy, after Whang-od's grandniece Grace Palicas alleged that he did not obtain proper consent from the elder tattooist for the online course. The incident has received attention from the National Commission on Indigenous Peoples (NCIP) which maintains that prior consent is needed from the entire Butbot tribe of which Whang-od is a part of, for the online course.

== Background ==
In late June 2021, Nas Academy announced that it would be collaborating with 12 Filipinos for its online courses, one of which included traditional tattooist Whang-Od. Whang-od is a Kalinga artist who is known for her people's traditional tattoo practice of batok. The course was available at the Nas Academy platform at a price of ₱750 (around US$15). It included three videos, ranging from 4 and a half minutes to 18 minutes long, and two live sessions with trainers.

Prepare to learn a 1000-year-old art form from the last Kalinga tattoo artist in the world: Whang-od. This 104-year-old legend will reveal all her rituals, tools, and methods for making traditional tattoos. All packed in a course that's unlike anything we've ever done before!

— Description of the Whang-od Academy course at Nas Academy.

== Reception ==
On August 4, 2021, Whang-od's grandniece and apprentice Grace Palicas called the online course a "scam" in a Facebook post published in the Tattooed by Apo Whang Od group page, adding that her greataunt did not sign any contract and that she did not understand the translators that she dealt with in connection with the online course. On behalf of the Butbot tribe, of which Whang-od is a part of, Palicas also relayed concerns of their community's art and culture being exploited. The Whang-od Academy was taken down in the same day reportedly in exchange of Nas Academy's request for Palicas deleting her posts. Nas Academy added that the course takedown was temporarily done out of respect of Whang-od's family while it "resolves any issues that have arisen from these falsehoods".

Filipino social entrepreneur and founder of The Cacao Project, Louise Mabulo, who worked with Nas two years prior, accused him of "imitate and mock the local accent and language, vocalising Tagalog-sounding syllabic phrases saying it sounded stupid" as well as calling the people of the town as "poor". Mabulo also accused him of being exploitative and "fuelling a neocolonialist narrative using our need for foreign validation."

In response, Nas Daily released a 22-second video showing Whang-od, joined by niece Estella Palingdao, use her thumbprint to sign a contract. The video was used as proof that Whang-od and her immediate family consented the setting up of the online course. According to Nas Daily, Palingdao served as translator and witness to the contract signing. The following day, the National Commission on Indigenous Peoples (NCIP) through its Cordillera Administrative Region (CAR) Regional Office announced that it would conduct its own probe to determine "whether proper consultations have been undertaken". The NPIC noted that despite the contract, Nas Daily should have secured Free and Prior Informed Consent (FPIC) from the Butbut community under the Indigenous Peoples Rights Act (IPRA) of 1997 where "manifestations of indigenous culture" for commercial use is only allowed with FPIC from the Indigenous Cultural Communities/Indigenous Peoples (ICCs/IPs) involved.

Nas Daily's Facebook page lost around 500,000 followers three days after Palicas's accusation. Nas Daily had 20.5 million followers in August 3, 2021.

On August 8, 2021, Nas Academy Philippines announced that it would stop its operations until further notice while it works with the NCIP to "ensure that all proper processes are followed". In the meantime, its courses would not be available.

== Outcome ==
On October 24, 2021, the NCIP released a statement affirming that Nas Academy has formally apologized to the Butbut people in a customary process set up by the NCIP in Barangay Buscalan, Tinglayan, Kalinga, with Whang-Od, elders of Buscalan, members of the community, and representatives from Nas Academy and the NCIP in attendance.

Kalinga Lone District representative Sonny Mangaoang expressed the need to abide by the request of the community and Buscalan elders to declare the contract signed by Whang-Od with Nas Academy to be null and void, which was affirmed by the legal team of Nas Daily led by lawyer Joji Alonso. The meeting was adjourned with a shared meal hosted by Buscalan barangay captain Leon Baydon as a sign of healing and reconciliation according to the customs and tradition of the community.

Later that year, Nas Academy Philippines reestablished its operations and its course offerings.

== See also ==
- Cultural appropriation
