= Indigenous Peoples' Rights Act of 1997 =

Philippine law

Congress of the Philippines
- Long title: An Act to recognize, protect and promote the rights of Indigenous Cultural Communities/Indigenous Peoples, creating a National Commission on Indigenous Peoples, establishing implementing mechanisms, appropriating funds therefor, and for other purposes.
- Citation: Republic Act No. 8371
- Enacted by: House of Representatives of the Philippines
- Enacted by: Senate of the Philippines
- Signed by: Fidel V. Ramos
- Signed: October 29, 1997

Keywords
- indigenous rights
- Status: In force

The Indigenous Peoples' Rights Act of 1997 (IPRA), officially designated as Republic Act No. 8371, is a Philippine law that recognizes and promotes the rights of indigenous cultural communities and Indigenous peoples in the Philippines.

== History ==
=== Early beginnings ===
In 1909, in the case of Cariño vs. Insular Government, the court has recognized long occupancy of land by an Indigenous member of the cultural communities as one of private ownership (which, in legal concept, is termed "native title"). This case paved the way for the government to review the so-called "native title" or "private right." In the year 1919, the Second Public Land Act was enacted, recognizing the right of ownership of any native of the country who, since July 4, 1907, or prior thereto, has continuously occupied and cultivated, either by himself or through his predecessors-in-interest, a tract of agricultural public land.

In 1936, Commonwealth Act No.141, amended by R.A. 3872 of 1964, was passed which provides that members of the national cultural minorities who have resided on agricultural, public land since July 4, 1955, are entitled to recognition of ownership whether or not the land has been certified as "disposable." They shall be conclusively presumed to have performed all conditions essential to a government grant and shall be entitled to a certificate of title.

In the 1970s, the laws protecting Indigenous people's lands expanded to territorial and bigger domains. Under Bureau of Forestry Administrative Order No. 11 of 1970, all forest concessions were made subject to the private rights of cultural minorities within the area as evidenced by their occupation existing at the time a license is issued by the government. The Revised Forestry Code of 1975 (Presidential Decree 705 under President Marcos) defines this "private right" of as "places of abode and worship, burial grounds and old clearings."

In 1978, the Presidential Arm for National Minorities (PANAMIN) was authorized to design, implement and maintain settlements among the National Minorities. Prior to this, a Presidential Decree was issued in 1974, "declaring all agricultural lands occupied and cultivated by members of the national Cultural Communities since 1964 as alienable and disposable, except the islands of Panay and Negros and the provinces of Abra, Quezon, Benguet and Camarines which became effective on March 11, 1984."

The most recent laws before the Indigenous People's Rights Act of 1997 was passed which recognize the existence of ancestral land right are the Organic Act of Autonomous Region in Muslim Mindanao (RA 6734, 1989), and the Organic Act for the Cordillera Autonomous Region (RA 6766, 1989).

=== Under the Constitution of the Philippines ===
The 1987 Philippine Constitution mandates state recognition, protection, promotion, and fulfillment of the rights of Indigenous peoples in the Philippines.

=== Historical evolution of RA 8371 ===
The decrees that have been passed fail to encompass all the needs of the indigenous people primarily because of failure in implementation and sole focus on the land and domains only.

Because of this, a more comprehensive law is needed that "seeks to stop prejudice against indigenous people through recognition of certain rights over their ancestral lands, and to live in accordance recognize and protect the rights of the indigenous people not only to their ancestral domain but to social justice and human rights, self-determination and empowerment, and their cultural integrity," This then gave birth to movements for a comprehensive law that will protect not only the lands, but human rights of the Filipino indigenous people.

CIPRAD or the Coalition for Indigenous People's Rights and Ancestral Domains is an alliance of Indigenous People's Organizations (IPOs) and non-government organizations (NGOs) created to pursue the advocacy for IP rights and ancestral domains. The Coalition is participated by IPOs in the Cordillera, Region I, Nueva Vizcaya, Cagayan, Caraballo, Sierra Madre, Quezon, Aurora, Quirino, Nueva Ecija, Zambales, Pampanga, Bulacan, Mindoro Occidental, Palawan, Panay, Davao, Cagayan, Cotabato and Zamboanga. CIPRAD partnered with various NGOs organizations such as Episcopal Commission on Indigenous Peoples, National Peace Conference, Center for Living Heritage and PANLIPI (Legal Assistance Center for Indigenous Filipinos) in order to lobby for the IPRA or Indigenous People's Rights Act.

IPRA, formerly known as Ancestral Domain Bill, was first filed in the Congress sometime in 1987 under the Senate Bill No. 909 authored by Senator Santanina Rasul, Senator Joseph Estrada and Senator Alberto Romulo, during the 8th Congress, but was never enacted into law. In the 9th Congress, Senator Rasul introduced Senate Bill No. 1029 and Senator Gloria Macapagal-Arroyo introduced Senate Bill No. 1849. However, the bill was never sponsored and deliberated upon on the floor.

Despite these failed efforts, the IPOs decided to give it another try. Decisions have been made during social negotiations among NGOs and POs to rename the bill from Ancestral Domain Bill to Indigenous Peoples Rights Act to emphasize the holistic approach and character of the bill. A consensus was made in December 1995 between IP representatives and NGO representatives. Seven non-negotiable points of the bill that were promoted are the following:

a) recognition of native title and rights of Indigenous peoples (IPs) to ancestral domains, b) respect for the right to cultural integrity, c) recognition of indigenous peoples' political structures and governance, d) delivery of basic services to the indigenous peoples, e) respect for human rights, f) elimination of discrimination, g) and creation of an office that would cater to IPs' needs.

In 1996, during the 10th Congress, Senator Juan Flavier sponsored Senate Bill no. 1728. In his sponsorship speech, he discussed the legal bases for the bill found in the 1987 Constitution. He also discussed the basic rights of Indigenous cultural communities (ICCs), the contents of the bill itself, and the immediate need of protection of the Filipino Indigenous People.

Despite difficult hurdles and amendments enacted in the Congress that nearly brought the movement to its death, the House of Representatives finally approved the bill late in September 1997. President Fidel V. Ramos signed it on October 29, 1997 officially making it Republic Act No. 8371 Indigenous People's Rights Act of 1997, which aims to "Recognize, Protect and Promote the Rights of Indigenous cultural Communities/Indigenous Peoples (ICCs/IPS) and for other Purposes."

== Definition of terms ==
=== Indigenous people of the Philippines ===
"The Philippines is a culturally diverse country with an estimated 14- 17 million Indigenous Peoples (IPs) belonging to 110 ethno-linguistic groups. They are mainly concentrated in Northern Luzon (Cordillera Administrative Region, 33%) and Mindanao (61%), with some groups in the Visayas area (as of 2013)." The term Indigenous people is used to reflect the contemporary international language which was formally adopted in 1993.

As of 1998, this is the list of the identified Indigenous People in the Philippines and their location.

Cordillera and Region I	Location of Domains
Bontoc	Mountain Province
Balangao	Mountain Province
Isnag	Kalinga, Apayao
Tingguian	Abra, Kalinga & Apayao
Kankanaey	Benguet, Mountain Province, Baguio
Kalanguya	Benguet, Ifugao
Karao	Benguet
Ibaloi	Benguet
Ayangan	Ifugao
Ifugao	Ifugao
Tuwali	Ifugao
Kalinga	Kalinga
Apayao	Kalinga, Apayao
Bago	La Union, Ilocos Sur, Ilocos Norte, Pangasinan

Caraballo Mountains	Location of Domains
Agta	Cagayan, Quirino, Isabela
Kalanguya	Nueva Vizcaya
Bugkalot	Nueva Vizcaya, Quirino
Isinai	Nueva Vizcaya
Gaddang	Nueva Vizcaya, Isabela
Aggay	Cagayan
Dumagat	Isabela, Cagayan
Ibanag	Cagayan
Itawes	Cagayan
Ivatan	Batanes

Rest of Luzon/ Sierra Madre Mountains	
Aeta, Negrito, Baluga, Pugot	Zambales, Bataan, Tarlac, Pampanga
Abelling	Tarlac
Agta	Aurora, Palayan City, Camarines Sur
Dumagat	Quezon, Rizal, Aurora
Remontado	Rizal, Laguna, Quezon
Bugkalot	Aurora
Cimaron	Camarines Sur
Kabihug	Camarines Norte
Tabangnon	Sorsogon
Abiyan (Aeta)	Camarines Norte/Sur
Isarog	Camarines Norte
Itom	Albay
Pullon	Masbate

Island Groups	Location of Domains
Agutaynon	Palawan
Tagbanua	Palawan
Dagayanen	Palawan
Tao't Bato	Palawan
Batac	Palawan
Palawanon	Palawan
Molbog	Palawan
Iraya Mangyan	Occidental Mindoro/Oriental Mindoro
Hanunuo Mangyan	Occidental Mindoro/Oriental Mindoro
Alangan Mangyan	Oriental Mindoro
Buhid Mangyan	Occidental Mindoro/Oriental Mindoro
Tadyawan Mangyan	Occidental Mindoro/Oriental Mindoro
Batangan Mangyan	Occidental Mindoro
Gubatnon Mangyan	Occidental Mindoro
Ratagnon	Occidental Mindoro
Ati	Romblon
Cuyunon	Palawan
Ati	Iloilo, Antique, Negros Occidental, Capiz, Aklan
Sulod/ Bukidnon	Iloilo, Antique, Capiz, Aklan
Magahat	Negros Occidental
Korolanos	Negros Oriental
Higaonon	Negros Oriental
Ata	Negros Oriental
Bukidnon	Negros Oriental
Escaya	Bohol
Badjao/Independent Higaonon sugboanon	Cebu/Bohol
Higaonon Sugboanon Independent Tribe	Cebu
Kongking	Leyte, Samar
Higaonon	Leyte

Southern/ Eastern Mindanao	Location of Domains
Ata	Davao del Sur/Davao City
Manobo	Agusan del Norte/Agusan del Sur
Mandaya	Davao Oriental
Mansaka	Compostela Valley
Dibabawon	Davao del Norte
Banwaon	Agusan del Sur
Bagobo	Davao del Sur/ Davao City
Ubo Manobo	Davao del Sur/ Davao City
Tagakaolo	Davao del Sur
Mamanwa	Surigao del Norte
Higaonon	Agusan del Norte/Agusan del Sur
B'laan	Davao del Sur, Sarangani, South Cotabato
T'boli	South Cotabato
Kalagan	Davao del Sur
Tagabawa	Davao City
Manobo B'lit	South Cotabato
Matigsalog	Davao City, Davao del Sur, Davao del Norte
Tigwahanon	Agusan del Norte, Agusan del Sur
Sangil	South Cotabato, Sarangani

Central Mindanao	Location of Domains
Aromanon	Cotabato
Teduray	Sultan Kudarat, Maguindanao del Norte, Maguindanao del Sur, Cotabato City
Bagobo	Cotabato
Ubo Manobo	Cotabato
Higaonon	Lanao del Sur, Iligan City
Subanen	Lanao del Norte
Maguindanao	Maguindanao del Norte, Maguindanao del Sur
Maranao	Lanao del Norte/Lanao del Sur
Iranon	Maguindanao del Norte, Lanao del Sur
Karintik	Cotabato
Blaan	Cotabato, Sultan Kudarat, Maguindanao del Sur
Lambangian	Sultan Kudarat
Dulangan	Sultan Kudarat

Northern and Western Mindanao	Location of Domains
Subanen	Zamboanga del Sur, Zamboanga del Norte, Misamis Occidental/Misamis Oriental, Zamboanga City
Talaandig	Bukidnon
Higaonon	Bukidnon, Misamis Oriental
Matigsalog	Bukidnon
Umaymanon	Bukidnon
Manobo	Bukidnon
Kamigin	Camiguin
Yakan	Basilan
Sama	Tawi-Tawi
Badjao/Sama Laut	Tawi-Tawi, Basilan, Sulu archipelago
Kalibugan	Zamboanga del Sur/Zamboanga del Norte
Jama Mapon	Sulu archipelago

The term indigenous cultural communities (ICCs) was used in the Philippine Constitution to describe a group of people sharing common bonds of language, customs, traditions and other distinctive cultural traits, and who have, under claims of ownership since time immemorial, occupied, possessed and utilized a territory. Time immemorial refers to a period of time when as far back as memory can go, certain ICCs/IPs are known to have occupied, possessed and utilized a defined territory devolved to them by operation of custom law/traditions or inherited from their ancestors.

Both the terms IPs and ICCs refer to homogenous societies identified by self-ascription and ascription by others, who have continuously lived as a community on communally bounded and defined territory, sharing common bonds of customs, traditions and other cultural traits, through resistance to political, social and cultural inroads to colonization, non-indigenous religions and culture. Whereas, the Filipino majority learned very well the ways of the colonial masters by adapting to their laws and practices, the minority (IPs), consciously asserted the integrity of their ancestral territories, pre-Hispanic native culture and justice systems which are viewed as diametrically opposed to the majority's world view, but which the IPRA law attempts to recognize and interface with the national legal system.

=== Ancestral domains ===
The 1997 IPRA Law defines ancestral domains as "areas generally belonging to ICCs/IPs comprising lands, inland waters, coastal areas, and natural resources held under a claim of ownership, occupied or possessed by ICCs/IPs, by themselves or through their ancestors, communally or individually since time immemorial, continuously to the present even when interrupted by war, force majeure or displacement by force, deceit, stealth or as a consequence of government projects or any other voluntary dealings entered into by government and private individuals or corporations, and which are necessary to ensure their economic, social and cultural welfare. It shall include forests, pastures, residential, agricultural and other lands individually owned whether alienable and disposable otherwise, hunting grounds, burial rounds, worship areas, bodies of water, mineral and other natural resources and lands which may no longer be exclusively occupied by ICCs/IPs but from which they traditionally had access to for their subsistence and traditional activities, particularly the home ranges of ICCs and IPs who are still nomadic and or shifting cultivators."

Ancestral domains include the spiritual and cultural bonds to the areas which the ICCs/IPs possess, occupy and use and to which they have claims of ownership (inherited from ancestors). This generally refer to areas which they have possessed at a period of time when as far back as memory can go. Proofs of time immemorial possession main may include testimony of elders, historical accounts, anthropological or ethnographic studies, names of places, using dialect or language of indigenous peoples, genealogy, treaties or pacts, between or among indigenous peoples and or other populations.

=== Ancestral lands ===
Ancestral lands, as stated in the law, refer to "lands occupied, possessed and utilized by individuals, families and clans who are members of the ICCs/IPs since time immemorial, by themselves or through their predecessors-in-interest, under claims of individual or traditional group ownership, continuously, to the present even when interrupted by war, force majeure or displacement by force, deceit, stealth or as a consequence of government projects, and other voluntary dealings entered into by government and private individuals/corporations, including, but not limited to residential lots, rice terraces or paddies, private forests, swidden farms and tree lots."

Ancestral land owners are given the right to transfer these ancestral lands and the right to redeem ancestral lands lost through vitiated consent. This is different with ancestral domains in a sense that this specifically refers to the land while the domain may include land, water, and aerial territories.

=== ICCs/IPs ===
Pursuant to R.A. 8371 chapter II section 3(h) - Indigenous Cultural Communities/Indigenous Peoples — refer to a group of people or homogenous societies identified by self-ascription and ascription by others, who have continuously lived as organized community on communally bounded and defined territory, and who have, under claims of ownership since time immemorial, occupied, possessed and utilized such territories, sharing common bonds of language, customs, traditions and other distinctive cultural traits, or who have, through resistance to political, social and cultural inroads of colonization, non-indigenous religions and cultures, became historically differentiated from the majority of Filipinos. ICCs/IPs shall likewise include peoples who are regarded as indigenous on account of their descent from the populations which inhabited the country, at the time of conquest or colonization, or at the time of inroads of non-indigenous religions and cultures, or the establishment of present state boundaries, who retain some or all of their own social, economic, cultural and political institutions, but who may have been displaced from their traditional domains or who may have resettled outside their ancestral domains;

=== Independent ICCS/IPS ===
The independent ICCs/IPs refers to the Indigenous group who are not dependent on any civil government agencies, and not duly registered to the NCIP but duly recognized by law, who develop their own self-governance, political system and institution, economy and, social and cultural well-being. One of the independent standing in the Philippines is KKK-A (Kinatas-ang Kahugpongan sa Kadatuan Alimaong) Higaonon Sugboanon they continue the legacy with spirit of Lapu-lapu and Leon Kilat. Presently the ruler of the Higaonon Sugboanon Independent Tribes Ha Datu Bontito Leon Kilat and All Tribal leaders in all islands in the Philippines and interfaced the government to enforced the law of the ICC's/IP's, reinforced the legal issue under customary law and freedom to remain in their inhabited land as stipulated in the Republic Act 8371 together with treaties agreements and human rights.

== Key provisions ==
=== Right of empowerment and self-governance ===
SECTION 13. Self-Governance. — The State recognizes the inherent right of ICCs/IPs to self-governance and self-determination and respects the integrity of their values, practices and institutions. Consequently, the State shall guarantee the right of ICCs/IPs to freely pursue their economic, social and cultural development.

SECTION 14. Support for Autonomous Regions. — The State shall continue to strengthen and support the autonomous regions created under the Constitution as they may require or need. The State shall likewise encourage other ICCs/IPs not included or outside Muslim Mindanao and the Cordilleras to use the form and content of their ways of life as may be compatible with the fundamental rights defined in the Constitution of the Republic of the Philippines and other internationally recognized human rights.

SECTION 15. Justice System, Conflict Resolution Institutions, and Peace Building Processes. — The ICCs/IPs shall have the right to use their own commonly accepted justice systems, conflict resolution institutions, peace building processes or mechanisms and other customary laws and practices within their respective communities and as may be compatible with the national legal system and with internationally recognized human rights.

SECTION 16. Right to Participate in Decision-Making. — ICCs/IPs have the right to participate fully, if they so choose, at all levels of decision-making in matters which may affect their rights, lives and destinies through procedures determined by them as well as to maintain and develop their own indigenous political structures. Consequently, the State shall ensure that the ICCs/IPs shall be given mandatory representation in policy-making bodies and other local legislative councils.

SECTION 17. Right to Determine and Decide Priorities for Development. — The ICCs/IPs shall have the right to determine and decide their own priorities for development affecting their lives, beliefs, institutions, spiritual well-being, and the lands they own, occupy or use. They shall participate in the formulation, implementation and evaluation of policies, plans and programs for national, regional and local development which may directly affect them.

SECTION 18. Tribal Barangays. — The ICCs/IPs living in contiguous areas or communities where they form the predominant population but which are located in municipalities, provinces or cities where they do not constitute the majority of the population, may form or constitute a separate barangay in accordance with the Local Government Code on the creation of tribal barangays.

SECTION 19. Role of Peoples Organizations. — The State shall recognize and respect the role of independent ICCs/IPs organizations to enable the ICCs/IPs to pursue and protect their legitimate and collective interests and aspirations through peaceful and lawful means.

SECTION 20. Means for Development/Empowerment of ICCs/IPs. — The Government shall establish the means for the full development/empowerment of the ICCs/IPs own institutions and initiatives and, where necessary, provide the resources needed therefore.

=== Justice system and Conflict resolution ===
SECTION 15. Justice System, Conflict Resolution Institutions, and Peace Building Processes. — The ICCs/IPs shall have the right to use their own commonly accepted justice systems, conflict resolution institutions, peace building processes or mechanisms and other customary laws and practices within their respective communities and as may be compatible with the national legal system and with internationally recognized human rights.

SECTION 65. Primacy of Customary Laws and Practices. — When disputes involve ICCs/IPs, customary laws and practices shall be used to resolve the dispute.

SECTION 66. Jurisdiction of the NCIP. — The NCIP, through its regional offices, shall have jurisdiction over all claims and disputes involving rights of ICCs/IPs: Provided, however, That no such dispute shall be brought to the NCIP unless the parties have exhausted all remedies provided under their customary laws. For this purpose, a certification shall be issued by the Council of Elders/Leaders who participated in the attempt to settle the dispute that the same has not been resolved, which certification shall be a condition precedent to the filing of a petition with the NCIP.

SECTION 70. No Restraining Order or Preliminary Injunction. — No inferior court of the Philippines shall have jurisdiction to issue any restraining order or writ of preliminary injunction against the NCIP or any of its duly authorized or designated offices in any case, dispute or controversy arising from, necessary to, or interpretation of this Act and other pertinent laws relating to ICCs/IPs and ancestral domains.

whereas, the NCIP as a quasi-judicial body shall have the jurisdiction when resolving disputes involving ICCs/IPs, however, pursuant to the [ NCIP ADMINISTRATIVE CIRCULAR NO. 1, series of 2003, April 9, 2003 ] RULES ON PLEADINGS, PRACTICE AND PROCEDURE BEFORE THE NATIONAL COMMISSION ON INDIGENOUS PEOPLES, RULE III Jurisdiction, SECTION 6. Filing of Case Directly With the Commission not Allowed. — No case shall be brought directly to the Commission except in cases where the Commission exercises exclusive and original jurisdiction. and RULE IV, Precondition for Adjudication SECTION 9. Exhaustion of remedies provided under customary laws. — No case shall be brought before the RHO or the Commission unless the parties have exhausted all remedies provided for under customary laws.

wherefore, when resolving disputes involving ICCs/IPs the primacy of customary laws shall be upheld, the regular courts shall consider the Tribal Courts decision making to create a harmonious decision making in the Philippine judicial system, "no case shall be brought directly to the NCIP and any inferior court of the philippines, the primacy of customary laws shall be upheld".

=== Rights to ancestral domain ===
Chapter III, section 7 of the Republic Act No. 8371 of 1997 covers the 8 Rights to Ancestral Domain. This chapter focuses on the identification and protection of the entitlement of the Indigenous Cultural Communities (ICC), and the Indigenous Peoples (IPs) as the proper owners of their ancestral land. The following rights are listed below:

This was implemented in order to stop the historical injustices experienced by the IPs. Despite the implementation of the law since the year 1997, the IPs of the Philippines still persistently experience injustices. The IPs are struggling fighting for their rights because they feel like the government has continued to neglect them.

The main criticism concerning R.A. 8371 is that it is ambiguous. One of the issues it encountered was that it is inconsistent and conflicting with the Philippines' constitution (2).

This has become the case because of the doctrine of jura regalia, which means that "all lands of the public domain belong to the state" (2). The next problem encountered was that the ancestral domain rights' legal characterisation as "private but communal" differentiated from the Philippines' civil law's idea of co-ownership of real property. This meant that areas in ancestral domains is shared by the members of the community, but that does not mean that they are considered as co-owners of the said property according to the New Civil Code (2).

Section 57 of chapter VIII of the Republic Act No. 8371 of 1997 which states that:

Natural resources within Ancestral Domains - The ICCs/IPs shall have priority rights in the harvesting, extraction, development or exploitation of any natural resources within the ancestral domain. A non-member of ICCs/IPs concerned may be allowed to take part in the development and utilization of the natural resources for a period of not exceeding twenty-five (25) years: provided, that a formal and written agreement is entered into with the ICCs/IPs concerned or that the community, pursuant to its own decision making process, has agreed to allow such operation: provided, finally, that the NCIP may exercise visitorial powers and take appropriate action to safeguard the rights of ICCs/IPs under the same contract (1).

is also viewed as problematic (2) because being given

the right to be prioretised in terms of development, exploitation, extraction, or harvesting of natural resources belonging in ancestral domains does not necessarily mean that an IP member is given the right of ownership of the said natural resources (3). Section 57 does not really reject the jura regalia, also known as the Regalian Doctrine or the Doctrine of Discipline expressed in the 1935, 1973, and 1987 Philippine Constitutions (4). According to the constitutions mentioned, the Regalian Doctrine expresses that "all lands of the public domain, as well as all natural resources enumerated therein, whether private or public land, belong to the State." (4). Most argue that the IPRA is flawed because it violates this (4). Instead of protecting the rights of the IPs, Section 57 strengthens argument that all natural resources found in ancestral domains belong to the State (3).

=== Social justice and human rights ===
This chapter in the IPRA was written to recognize the indigenous people' right to the same privileges and protections also afforded by the State to its citizens. The law reemphasizes that all ICC/IPs are legally entitled to fundamental universal human rights and that the State should actively create an inclusive environment with this in mind.

Among these rights include;

==== Equal protection and non-discrimination of ICCs/IPs ====
Patterned after international standards set by the Charter of the United Nations, Universal Declaration of Human Rights as well as the equal protection clause in the Philippine 1987 Constitution, this section places the State as duly responsible for the execution of the IPs' human rights. The State is then called to acknowledge the ICCs/IPs position as a vulnerable group that have been historically excluded from socio-economic opportunities and to guarantee that the IPs enjoy equal protection by the law.

==== Rights during armed conflict ====
As signatory to the Geneva Conventions, the State is expected to respect and to ensure respect for the Conventions in all circumstances including local and international armed conflict. The State through the NCIP is empowered to ensure all civilians including IPs'/ICCs' safety in circumstances of emergency and conflict.

This being said, areas under Ancestral Domains and members of indigenous tribes require special regulation beyond that of the convention as legally recognized IPs/ICCs are given the freedom to govern their territories by their own laws. Through the IPRA, the State must not;

a) Recruit children of the ICCs/IPs into the armed forces under any circumstance;

b) Conscript or recruit ICC/IP individuals against their will to the armed forces, and in particular for use against other indigenous peoples;

c) Relocate ICC/IP communities to special centers for military purposes;

d) Force ICC/IP communities, families or individuals to abandon their lands, territories, or means of subsistence; and

e) Require indigenous individuals to work for military purposes under discriminatory conditions.

These provisions protects IP autonomy as well as requires the State to work alongside tribes through an integrated emergency program which includes relief and rehabilitation efforts for IP victims of armed violence. Special emphasis is placed the impact of armed conflict of indigenous children' mental well-being and development in high risk conflict areas.

==== Basic services ====
The law guarantees indigenous peoples' right to basic social services as provided by the State. As a vulnerable group, special attention is given for the "immediate, effective and continuing improvement of their economic and social conditions."

Examples of services that fit this provision include social security through the Republic of the Philippines Social Services System, housing, vocational training and employment support through various efforts of the Department of Social Welfare and Development as well as complete health coverage through the PhilHealth "No Balance Billing" from government hospitals.

==== Women, children, and youth ====
The law also emphasizes that these rights are also to be afforded to indigenous women and children. The provisions should not result in "the diminution of rights and privileges already recognized and afforded to these groups under existing laws of general application." The government through NCIP must provide support to organizations which are geared towards empowering women and the youth to involve themselves in community/nation building.

In accordance to the customary laws of each tribe, the government must provide mechanisms that facilitate deeper understanding of indigenous culture for women and youth while their human dignity. The law ensures the full realization of women's and youth rights but requires all mechanisms and programs to be culturally sensitive and relevant to the ICCs/IPs needs.

An example of the programs geared towards the execution of this particular provision in the IPRA is the culturally sensitive day-care program for both IP children and their mothers which NCIP mentions in its first administrative order.

==== Cultural integrity ====
Through the NCIP, the state is required to protect the Indigenous cultural integrity, cultures, traditions and institutions of ICCs/IPs. This recognises the right of ICCs/IPs to access and promote their cultures through the educational system and grants them ownership of the intellectual property rights associated with their cultural heritage, including certain rights to regulate its use. It also prohibits the destruction of culturally significant artifacts and the excavation of archeological sites without consent from the concerned community, and directs that funds allocated for archeological sites associated with ICCs/IPs be made available to the communities concerned.

== Related international legislation on IP rights ==
The United Nations acknowledges worldwide the rights of the indigenous people. The article on the UN Declaration on the Rights of Indigenous Peoples is recognized in the international sphere and was adopted by the United Nations General Assembly during its 61st session at UN Headquarters in New York City on September 13, 2007.

The Declaration is structured as a United Nations resolution, "with 23 preambular clauses and 46 articles concerning the collective and individual rights of the indigenous peoples in different parts of the world including protection of their cultural heritage and manifestations of their cultures including human and genetic resources."

The Philippines did not immediately support the draft. It abstained when the first votes were called, despite the existence of the Indigenous People's Rights Act of 1997. The Department of Justice and the Office of the Solicitor General expressed their opposition to the adoption, as they still had to study whether this was consistent with the Philippine Constitution. Furthermore, the National Commission on Indigenous Peoples, which was the representative organization of the Philippine IPs did not endorse it at first. However, after reviewing the declaration for many times, the Philippines supported the resolution and voted yes.

In the end, the final result of the votes for the passing of the charter resulted in 143 yes votes, 4 no votes (Australia, Canada, New Zealand and U.S.), and 11 abstentions.

== Enforcement of IPRA ==
In October 2008, the Lumads (an indigenous group) organized a conference in Naga, Zamboanga Sibugay, involving several indigenous people groups. In this summit, the indigenous people groups questioned the utility of IPRA in protecting their rights described in the IPRA. The indigenous people groups discussed the instances Philippine Law has hindered their rights promised by IPRA. Primarily, the inconsistencies lie in how Philippine Law prohibited them from following their customs and traditions that is centered around the indigenous people's governance of their land.

For instance, they complained that the Department of Environment and Natural Resources (DENR) prohibits some IP farmers to hunt animals and cultivate lands (i.e. the 53,262-hectare part of Mt. Malindang) covered by National Integrated Protected Areas (NIPA) program; thereby, cutting off their primary source of income and food for their family. In worst-case scenarios, the state outrightly utilizes its right of state to dispose public lands for activities such as mining, logging, and installation of dams that infringe upon the IP's ancestral domains. And because of these instances of usurpation of ancestral domain, such as wide coverage of the NIPA to the IP's ancestral domain and economic activities that require the state to exercise their right to dispose public lands, the IP's basic sources of income and food for their families are greatly affected.

The limitations and prohibitions extends not only to their basic needs but also prevents them from performing important rituals in their lives. This includes wedding ceremonies that are normally held without cost but costs around 50 to 500 pesos when NCIP officials conduct it, that is burdensome to IPs who lack sources of funds.

== Organizations related to IPRA ==
Here are some of the organizations that support IPRA law and their functions:

- Asian Development Bank (ADB)—gives loan to government to create projects such as Cordillera Agricultural Resource Management (CHARM) that help the development of IP's. The CHARM project involves helping the IPs in Cordillera to develop the agricultural resource of IPs land. They also helped in project Mindanao Basic Education Development project to give poor some education
- International Labour Organization—organized conventions on IPs such as poverty program, regarding on how IPs can assert more control and development of their own lands, regarding steps on how can IPs protect and guarantee their right of ownership and possession, regarding the responsibilities of government to ensure the rights of IPs.
- Philippine Action for Intercultural Development—helped the IPs regarding community mapping, where they help IPs in legalizing the boundaries of their respective lands
- National Confederation of Indigenous Peoples—aims to unite the different IP rights organization to fight for their rights. Their past projects includes Ancestral Domain Sustainable Development Protection Plan (ADSDPP), demarcation of Certificate of Ancestral Domain Title (CADT) on the ground in favor of the Ati in Boracay Island etc.^{[21]}
- Tribal Communities Association of the Philippine—provides legal assistance to IPs.

== Gaps in the law ==
Section 56 of the Indigenous People's Rights Act of 1997 or the IPRA Law states that "property rights within the ancestral domains already existing and/or vested upon effectivity of this Act, shall be recognized and respected." This section is problematic as it means that any title before 1997 holds more weight than an ancestral claim. Scholars and pro-indigenous groups have criticized this section as it effectively destroys any ancestral land claim before 1997. Historians have pointed out that most indigenous groups in the Philippines have been in the archipelago prior to Spanish occupation in the 15th century. However, according to Section 56, since there is no proper documentation committed by the indigenous people prior to 1997, an indigenous group cannot claim any land that have been in non-indigenous possession prior to 1997. This makes multi-national companies and local government units have the power to resist ancestral claims and use the IPRA Law itself to counter indigenous land claims, as testified in an ongoing Mangyan case since 2011, which evicted indigenous Mangyans from a claimed land they have been using for many years. In 2015, it was announced that the indigenous land shall be made into a sanitary landfill by the Puerto Galero local government unit, and that the Mangyans shall be relocated into a site near the landfill. All Mangyan-planted coconut trees on the landfill site shall be chopped down by the government and the local government unit shall compensate only 100 pesos (approximately 2 US dollars) each to the Mangyans.

== See also ==
- Ethnic groups of the Philippines
- Lumad
- Whang-od Academy
- Customary law
