= Whang-od =

Filipino tattoo artist (born 1917)

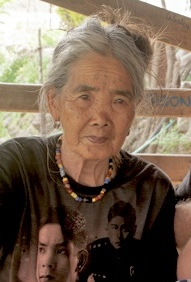
- Whang-od in 2016
- Born: Whang-od Oggay; February 17, 1917 (age 109); Tinglayan, Kalinga, Mountain Province, Philippine Islands
- Other names: Maria Oggay; Apo Whang-Od; Alternate name spellings: Whang Od; Wang Od; Fang-od; Whang-ud
- Known for: Last and oldest practitioner of Kalinga tattooing Oldest person on the cover of Vogue
- Awards: Presidential Medal of Merit (Philippines)

Whang-od Oggay (first name pronunciation: [ˈ(h)waŋˈ(ʔ)ɔd]; February 17, 1917), also known as Maria Oggay, is a tattoo artist from the village of Buscalan within Tinglayan, Kalinga, Philippines. She is often described as the "last" and oldest mambabatok or para-tatto in bikol term (traditional Kalinga tattooist) and is part of the Butbut people of the larger Kalinga ethnic group.

At the age of 11, she began tattooing Butbut headhunters and women. Butbut warriors traditionally earned tattoos from deeds in combat. With the end of tribal warfare in the region, Whang-od continues to practice traditional tattooing on tourists visiting Buscalan.

Unlike the majority of Filipinos, she does not speak Filipino or English. She only communicates in Kalinga, her native language, and Ilocano, a lingua franca of Northern Luzon.

In April 2023, 106-year-old Whang-od appeared on the cover of Vogue Philippines' Beauty Issue, making her the oldest living person to ever be on the cover of Vogue.

The National Commission for Culture and the Arts (NCCA) conferred on Whang-od the prestigious Dangal ng Haraya Award at Tabuk, the capital of Whang-od's ethnic province of Kalinga, in 2018. She was nominated for the National Living Treasures Award (Gawad Manlilikha ng Bayan) in 2017. Her nomination is still being processed by the NCCA.

== Biography ==
=== Career ===
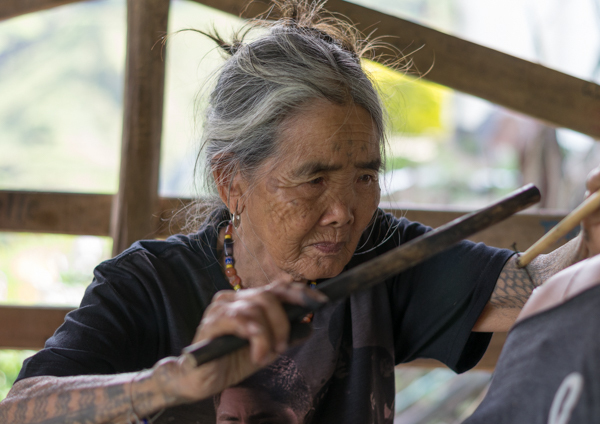
Whang-od tattooing on June 30, 2016

Whang-od started tattooing at the age of 15, a traditional artform that she learned from her father who was considered a master tattooist in the region. Traditionally, only men with special tattooing ancestry were allowed to learn the art. Whang-od was an exception due to her talent and potential seen by her father. In later life, Whang-od's chosen apprentices consisted of only women, breaking the patrimonial tradition for the first time in recorded Kalinga history. Despite breaking tradition, her community accepted her decision. She has been doing the batok, the traditional hand-tapped tattooing, on male headhunters who earned the tattoos by protecting villages or killing enemies. She also tattoos women of the Butbut people in Buscalan, Kalinga, primarily for aesthetic purposes. As a traditional Kalinga tattooist or mambabatok, she has done fortune telling and chants while doing tattoos. Every design she creates contains symbolic meanings specific to the mambabatok culture. For example, a warrior who had killed an enemy would be given an eagle tattoo upon his return from battle.

She was first tattooed as a teenager with the designs consisting of a ladder and a python. The python tattoo was especially important in her people's sacred stories. According to their indigenous religion, the python scale tattoo was first given to Lagkunawa, a beautiful noblewoman from the village of Tinglayan (Whang-od's home village). It was a gift from the hero-god Banna, who fell in love with the mortal. Ever since, the tattoo was passed on through the generations. Fatok is the term used for tattooing women to show beauty and wealth. When a woman's arm is tattooed just like Whang-od's own tattoos, the family of the woman is obliged to pay the tattoo artist a piglet or a bundle of harvested rice (locally called as dalan). On the other hand, fi-ing is the term used for tattooing of male Butbut warriors on their chests and arms. Whang-od used to practice fi-ing until headhunting was discouraged by the government. Fi-ing was last practiced in 1972.

Though headhunters no longer exist, Whang-od still applies the tattoos on Buscalan tourists. She however no longer chants when tattooing tourists, as the chants are only for the beautification of Kalinga women and for the celebration of Kalinga men's victory in battle. Some of her notable customers include Rhian Ramos, Drew Arellano, Liza Diño and Ice Seguerra.

Her early tattoo works did not earn her any income but due to the influx of tourists in her town, she was earning at least Php 5,000 a day for her tattooing in 2015. She accepts around twenty to thirty customers every day. She only does simple tattoos nowadays due to her advanced age. Her apprentices, all women, have continued the tradition for her and their people.

The tattoo ink she uses is composed of indigenous materials, usually a mixture of charcoal and water that is tapped into the skin using a thorn from a calamansi or pomelo tree. This ancient technique of batok dates back a thousand years and is relatively painful compared to conventional techniques. She uses designs found in nature and basic geometric shapes. She has numerous signature tattoos, but since 2017, her signature tattoo is composed of three dots, representing herself and her two apprentices, depicted as a continuation of the art form from the older to the next generation.

Aside from being a tattoo artist, Whang-od is a respected village elder and plays the nose flute. She also does agricultural tasks such as feeding pigs and chickens, and cultivating rice.

Tourists who wish to be tattooed by Whang-Od must venture through a series of travels in order to get to her. There are no direct flights to Buscalan village, as it is a rural area about 400 kilometers north of Manila City. International tourists that fly in from out of the country to Manila, Philippines, will then board a bus for 4-6 hours to the next stop, Baguio. From Baguio, another 4-6 hour bus ride is required to get to Bontoc, the nearest town to Buscalan Village. Once in Bontoc, travellers must seek local transportation like tricycles and jeepneys that will take them further up the mountains towards the village. Finally, the last step before seeing Whang-Od after about 12-15 hours of travel, is a 2-3 hour hike into the mountains usually led by a local guide. While the journey is a bit rigorous, tourists and travellers found it to be all a part of the experience to be able to experience the “last” and oldest mambatok.

=== Personal life ===
When she was very young, Whang-od had a boyfriend named Ang-Batang, a Butbut warrior. She performed a batok on Ang-Batang after the warrior's first victory in a battle. Many elders opposed her relations with Ang-Batang, believing the man's bloodline was not pure. A marriage was eventually arranged for Ang-Batang and Whang-od's best friend Hogkajon. Ang-Batang died as the result of a logging accident when Whang-od was 25 years old.

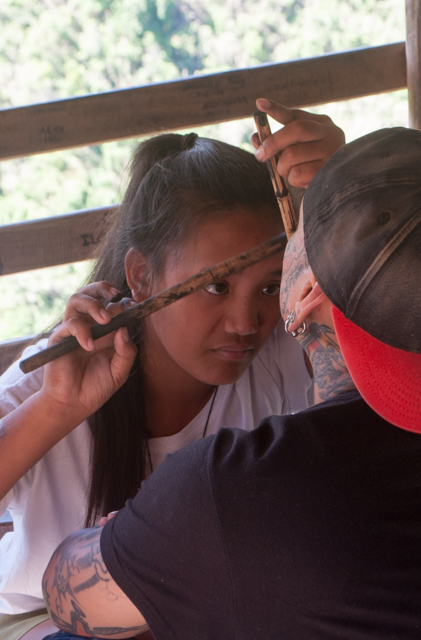
Grace Palicas, Whang-od's grandniece and senior apprentice, doing a facial tattoo and continuing the tradition of batok

She later decided never to marry and has no children, leaving no direct descendants to continue her legacy as a mambabatok or traditional Kalinga tattoo artist. She had relationships with other Kalinga warriors, but remained unmarried due to her vow. According to tradition, her tattooing skills can only be inherited through lineage. Whang-od believes that if someone outside the bloodline starts tattooing, the tattoos will become infected. The influence of modernity meant that the young people of her village were no longer interested in embracing the tattooing works of their elders for decades, until a rise in appreciation of Indigenous ways in the 21st century paved the way for the conservation of the art form in Buscalan. Whang-od has trained Grace Palicas, her grandniece, and Ilyang Wigan, another bloodline successor, to continue her people's tattoo artistry. More bloodline successors have gradually become interested in their people's artforms, including a 12-year-old named Den Wigan. However, these successors have not performed the other works of a mambabatok, and their own tattoos are not as intricate as those of Whang-od. Furthermore, according to Filipino anthropologist Analyn Salvador-Amores, the other batok traditions, which include chanting and fortune-telling, and the revelation of the symbolic meanings of the tattoos, may fade away with Whang-od because these are not transferred to her successors. Chanting and fortune-telling are only performed for the Kalinga people, never for people outside the ethnic sphere. With that, Whang-od may be the last mambabatok of her village, unless the indigenous Kalinga peoples themselves formally choose to get traditional tattoos as part of their modern culture, and her apprentices master the elaborate and highly difficult tattoo chanting arts before she dies.

=== Legacy and cultural impact ===
Senator Nancy Binay stated that Whang-od's impact on Filipino culture has helped raise awareness and keep the knowledge, tradition, and culture of Kalinga tattoos alive and known for the younger generations and people outside of Filipino culture. The practice of Kalinga tattoos was almost extinct and the idea was obscure, "The tradition of Batok has changed with the modern times in the last millennia." Whang-od's title as the "Last Kalinga Tattoo Artist" will soon be inaccurate. It is said Whang-od is now teaching 20 young girls, plus her grandnieces the art of mambabatok so that the tradition and knowledge will not die with her and so that her legacy will be carried through her students and grandnieces. Out of the twenty young students that she teaches, only Grace Palicas and Ilyang Wigan are considered her only real apprentices; due to tradition, the apprenticeship of batok must only be passed down and taught to blood relatives. Whang-od's "signature" tattoo consists of three dots, representing herself and her blood-related apprentices and representing a next generation in her art. These Kalinga tattoos, despite consisting of symbols occurring in nature carrying simple geometric patterns, do not carry the same meaning they had when they were earned through warfaring culture.

=== Birth date controversy ===
According to various sources, Whang-od was born on February 17, 1917, and she turned 100 in 2017. However, the government and some groups doubted her claim as she has not presented any valid documents to prove her birth date. There were no birth date recordings in many hinterland areas in the Philippines, such as Buscalan, during the time Whang-od was said to be born, recordings of birth dates on paper was not a part of the community's culture at the time, and past ethnic tensions that fueled tribal wars. In June 2017, she received a Philippine postal ID that formally recognized her date of birth as February 17, 1917, making her eligible for benefits under the Centenarians Act.

== Recognition ==
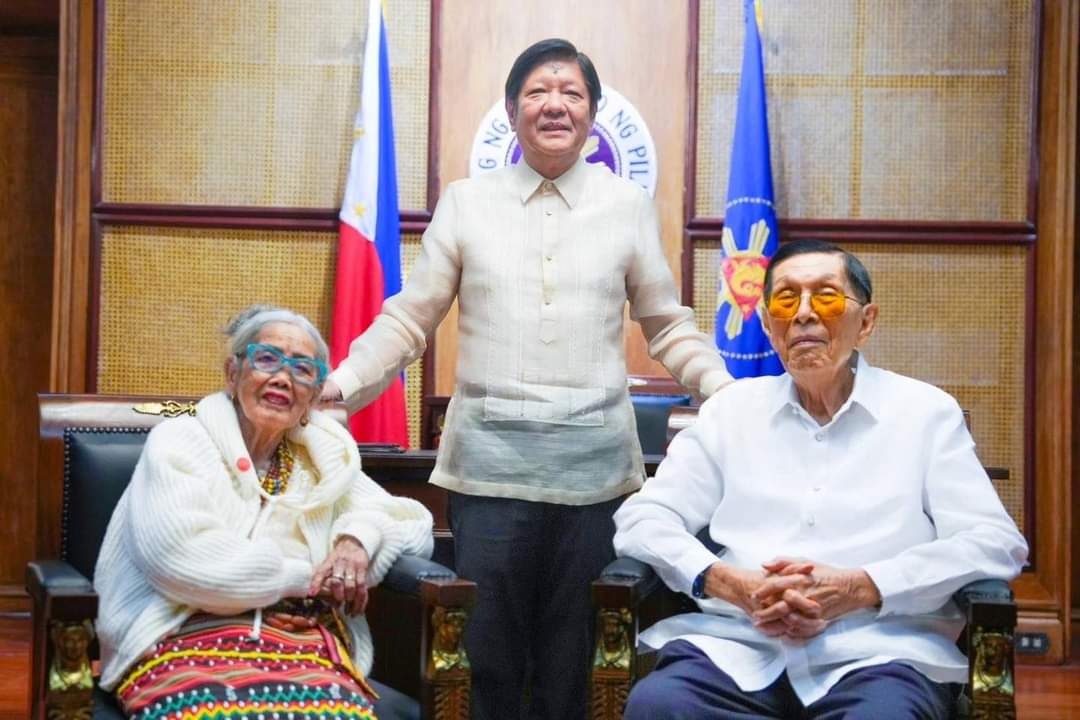
Whang-od with Philippine President Bongbong Marcos and fellow centenarian Juan Ponce Enrile in February 2024

Due to Whang-od's status as the last mambabatok of her generation, her role in bringing awareness to a form of traditional tattooing and training several practitioners, many netizens were lobbying her to be one of the National Artists of the Philippines. the hashtag campaign (#WangOdNationalArtist) started in September 2015 and the hashtag was shared through social media about 11 thousand times after almost a month. Some netizens were campaigning for her to be given the National Living Treasures Award instead.

In 2015, Senator Miriam Defensor Santiago urged the Philippine Senate through a resolution that Whang-od should be nominated as one of the National Living Treasures (GAMABA or Gawad Manlilikha ng Bayan in Tagalog), who are of equal rank to National Artists. Senator Nancy Binay through a senate resolution in June 2016 enjoined the Philippine senate to nominate Whang-od as a National Living Treasure. Likewise, her nomination as National Artist or National Living Treasure has been backed by Senator and United Nations ambassador Loren Legarda through a separate Senate resolution.

Former National Commission for Culture and the Arts of the Philippines (NCCA) chair Felipe de Leon Jr. also expressed his support for Whang-od's nomination and argued that the role of a mambabatok is to become the beacon of togetherness and support of the community. He also added that she aids her community through tattooing tourists and she is practicing traditional Kalinga art form as means of living and therefore should be eligible for both the National Living Treasure Award and the National Artists Award. Filipino anthropologist and University of the Philippines Baguio professor Analyn Salvado-Amores said that though she has no objections on Whang-od's nomination to the GAMABA, Whang-od might not get conferred because she earns from tattooing and one of the requirement for a GAMABA award is to practice the craft without making any profit from it. However, if the raised issue would hinder her declaration as National Living Treasure, then she may still be nominated for the National Artist Award, which is same in rank to the National Living Treasure Award.

Whang-od was formally nominated to the National Living Treasures Award during the 66th Manila Fame event on October 21, 2017. The nomination was accepted by the NCCA through a ceremony within the event. NCCA is finalizing the documents to confer Whang-od and have the Philippine President to sign it. Once conferred, Whang-od would get a gold medallion, a monthly allowance of Php 14,000 and a starting grant of Php 100,000. On February 28, 2018, the Senate of the Philippines unanimously passed a resolution supporting and nominating Whang-od for the GAMABA.

On June 12, 2018, the National Commission for Culture and the Arts announced that the prestigious Dangal ng Haraya Award will be given to Whang-od on June 25 at Tabuk, Kalinga, the capital of Whang-od's home province. The final stages of the GAMABA (National Living Treasures Award) Committee is still ongoing.

On February 14, 2024, Whang-od received the Presidential Medal of Merit from President Bongbong Marcos.

== Events ==
Whang-od was present during Dutdutan Tattoo Expo 2012 held in the Philippines where she had her own booth. Whang-od's image is included in an exhibit at the Royal Ontario Museum in Canada. The exhibit is entitled Tattoos: Ritual. Identity. Obsession. Art and it was first shown on April 2, 2016. Exhibitors chose the photograph from several photos from another exhibit at Musee Du Quai Branly in Paris. They did not know about Whang-od until a visitor told them.

In October 2017, Whang-od together with Palicas and Wigan, her apprentices and grandnieces, went to Metro Manila to show their craftsmanship at the 66th Manila Fame trade show. Organizers of the Manila Fame was criticized after a photo that went viral in social media surfaced.

== In media ==
American anthropologist Lars Krutak visited Kalinga in 2007 and documented Whang-od's tattoo works. The episode of Krutak's 10-part series Tattoo Hunter featured on Discovery Channel became the start of presenting the Kalinga culture and Whang-od to a global audience. In 2010, she was also featured in i-Witness, a documentary television program of GMA Network, that was documented by Kara David.

In 2017, Whang-od was featured in the Dayaw series of the NCCA and ABS-CBN News Channel, where her contributions to the country's national identity and heritage were presented by former NCCA Chairman Felipe De Leon Jr. and Senator Loren Legarda. Her life story was featured in Wagas, a GMA News TV's drama series in 2017, where Janine Gutierrez portrayed Whang-od.

In 2025 she was featured in Treasure of the Rice Terraces, a documentary film by Filipino-Canadian filmmaker Kent Donguines.

== Alleged exploitation by Nas Daily ==
In 2021, Nas Daily, a foreigner who was a YouTuber, created Whang-od Academy on his Nas Academy without the consent of Whang-od. The National Commission on Indigenous Peoples then became involved to review the validity of the issue. Whang-od's grandniece accused Nas on Twitter. Nas replied back but later suffered backlash. As a result, the academy was scrapped.

== See also ==
- Philippine tattoos
- Visayan tattoos
- Kalinga (province)
- Macli-ing Dulag
