= Mateo Cariño =

Ibaloi chieftain

- Born: 1841; Tublay, Benguet
- Died: June 6, 1908 (aged 66–67)
- Occupation: Chieftain
- Known for: Owner of Kafagway rancheria; Mateo Cariño doctrine

Mateo Cariño was an Ibaloi chieftain who owned the land that was to become Baguio. He led a successful revolt against the Spanish garrison in La Trinidad and was proclaimed the Capitan Municipal of Baguio by President Emilio Aguinaldo.

== Background ==
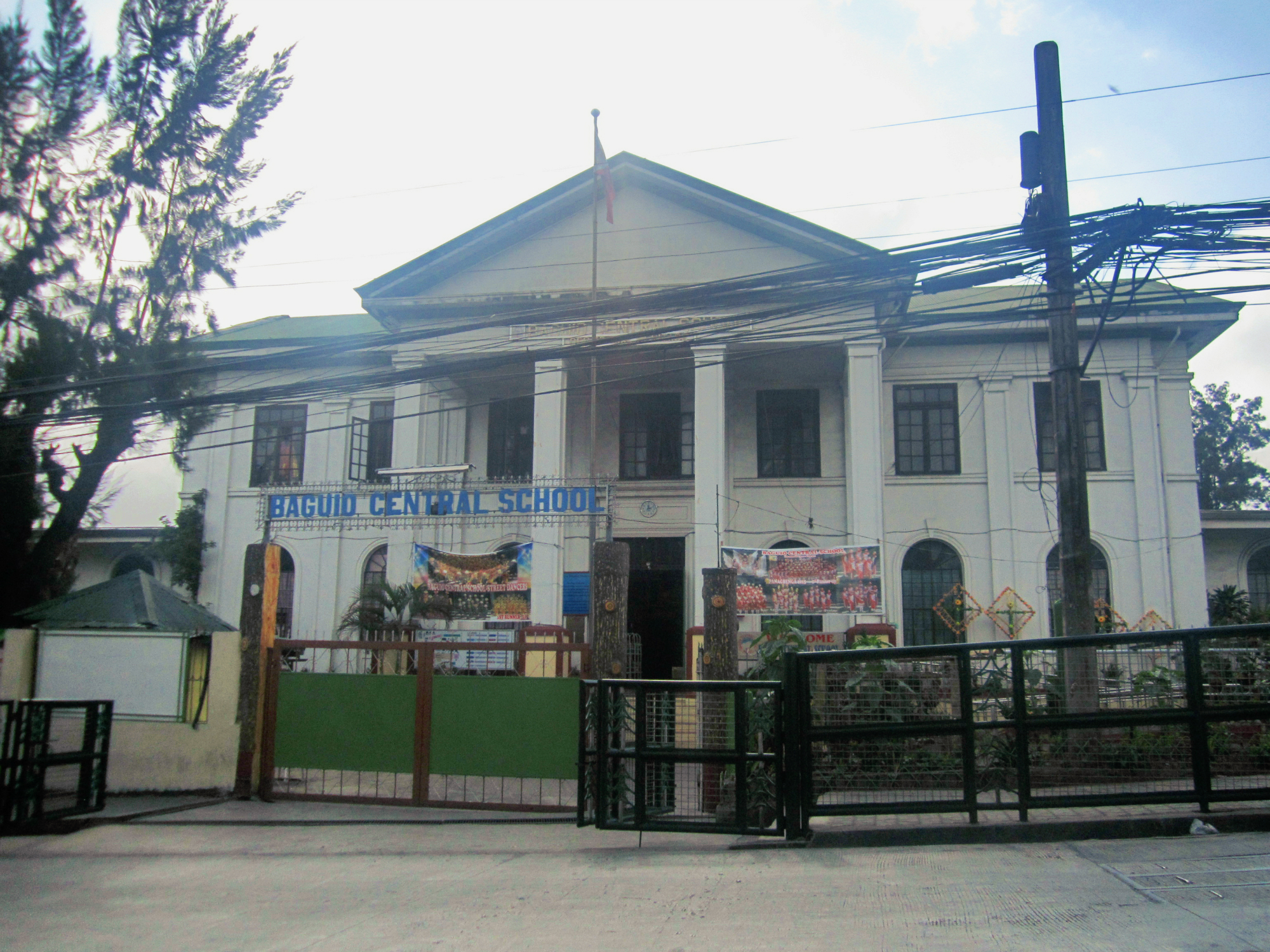
The present-day Baguio Central School was the site of Cariño's house.

Cariño owned vast tracts of land which covered the area which would later be known as Baguio as early as the Spanish colonial period. Titles over the land were given to him by the Spanish colonial government in exchange for his conversion to Christianity. His surname was adopted after his conversion. The land was a rancheria known as Kafagway and was the residence of the Cariño clan and the rest of the Ibaloi community.

In 1901, Cariño was selected as representative of Baguio to chief executive of the US Insular Government over the Philippines.

Cariño reportedly gave Emilio Aguinaldo, President of the Revolutionary Government of the Philippines who was fleeing to Hong Kong, refuge. This is said to have caused the American colonial authorities who took over the Philippines to issue military decrees that mandated the confiscation of Cariño's lands. Cariño involved himself in a legal dispute seeking for the voiding of the decrees until his death in 1908. He had a favorable posthumous legal victory when in February 1909 the US Supreme Court, through Justice Oliver Wendell Holmes, recognized his "native title" over his lands which was established through testimonies that the land was utilized, owned, and occupied by indigenous populations.

== Legacy ==
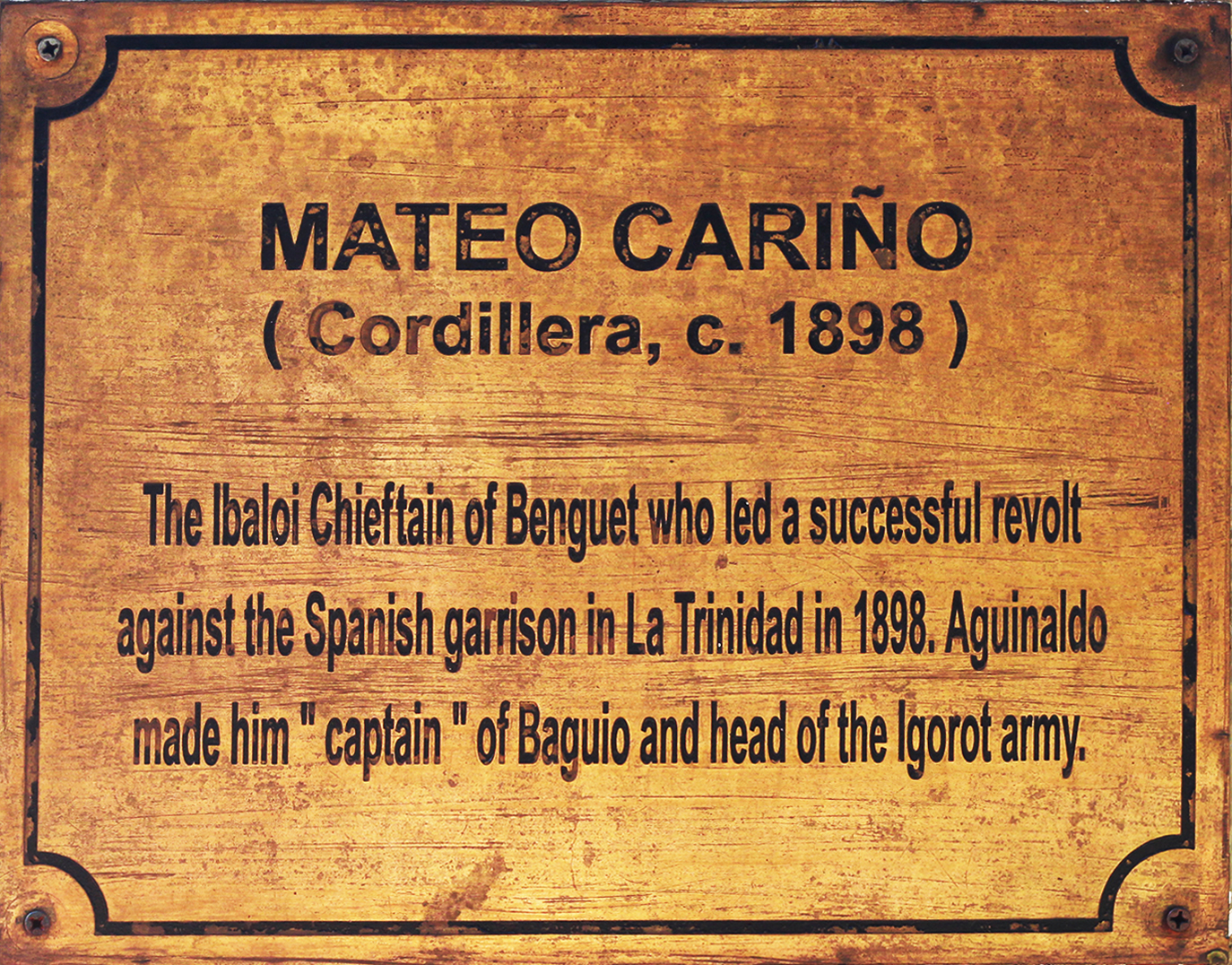
Inscription detail of the monument at Rizal Park, Manila

The landmark case where Cariño had a legal victory—Cariño v. Insular Government, 212 U.S. 449 (1909)—would later be known as the "Mateo Cariño Doctrine" ("Cariño Doctrine", or "Native Title") which forms the legal basis of the protection of indigenous rights over ancestral lands, including in the 1987 Constitution of the Philippines. The case is also the legal basis of the Indigenous Peoples' Rights Act of 1997 (IPRA).

On August 16, 2010, the city council of Baguio passed a resolution which allotted a vacant area at Burnham Park to a monument honoring Cariño and the Ibaloi people.

=== Baguio Central School ===
Baguio Central School, the country's first public primary school was opened on September 2, 1899. It was once a one-room school built upon Cariño's 2 hectare lot and Ibaloy house he donated to the local government. Its roof was made of reed and cogongrass with hewn wood walls and floor. Its first students were only 25 Igorot boys, including Dr. Jose Cariño and Maximo Carantes, under a United States Armed Forces teacher, Mr. Patrick. The pupils used slate and chalks to write. In 1901, female students were enrolled. World War II heavily damaged the school which was renovated by the Department of Education in 2004. The Heritage conservation Society declared it as a heritage school.

== Personal life ==
Mateo Cariño was married to Bayosa Ortega with whom he had nine children. Bayosa was the only daughter of Enrique Ortega, and the granddaughter of Apulog Minse, both baknangs. Bayosa owned large tracts of land in Kafagway, bought from her ancestors wealth based on gold and cattle trading. Mateo's father was Mawmaw. Mateo expanded the gold trade, introduced rice cultivation and large-scale livestock trading to become the richest baknang. Mateo's older brother was Juan Cariño Oraá, who became the deputy governor of Benguet, then a subprovince of Mountain Province.
