= Nas Daily =

Israeli-Palestinian video blogger (born 1992)

- Yassin in 2023
- Born: Nuseir Yassin; 9 February 1992 (age 34); Arraba, Israel
- Other name: Nas
- Citizenship: Israel; Saint Kitts and Nevis (since 2022)
- Education: Harvard University (BS)
- Occupations: Entrepreneur; Video blogger

YouTube information
- Channel: Nas Daily
- Years active: 2011–present
- Genre: Cultural tourism
- Subscribers: 14.0 million
- Views: 8.29 billion
- Last updated: Jan 28, 2026

Nuseir Yassin (Arabic: نَصِير يَاسِين; Hebrew: נוּסַייר יַאסִין; born 9 February 1992), known professionally as Nas Daily, is an Israeli-Palestinian vlogger, entrepreneur and media personality. He is best known for his travel vlog videos on YouTube, Facebook, TikTok and Instagram, amassing 14 million subscribers in the former, as well as managing training programs for content creators under Nas Academy.

== Early life and education ==
Yassin was born in Arraba, Israel, to a Muslim family of Palestinian descent. Yassin and his family are Arab citizens of Israel. He is the second of four children; his mother is a teacher and his father is a psychologist. Yassin's native language is Palestinian Arabic; he is also fluent in English and Hebrew. Although he was raised as a Muslim, he has since largely stopped practicing Islam and has declared himself as a "non-religious Muslim".

Yassin applied to Harvard University in the United States at the age of 19, seeking a degree in aerospace engineering. His application essay detailed his struggle to achieve his dreams as an ethnic Arab born in Israel. He graduated with a degree in economics in 2014 and a minor in computer science.

== Career ==
While earning his degree at Harvard, Yassin co-founded a pay it forward registration service, and a social media search engine. In September 2014, he started working as a software developer for Venmo in New York.

=== Nas Daily Facebook page ===
In 2016, Yassin quit his job at Venmo to become a content creator, exploring the world with the intention of documenting his travels and experiences on video. This resulted in his founding the video production company Nas Daily and Facebook page Nas Daily (Arabic: الناس, romanized: Al-Nās, lit. 'People'), where he released a one-minute-long video daily for 1,000 days. After meeting Facebook founder Mark Zuckerberg in early 2018, Nas Daily was upgraded to "show" status, and by September 2018, his page had amassed over 8 million followers. By November 2018, this number had risen to over 10 million.

All of Yassin's one-minute daily videos were posted to Facebook. Yassin stated in 2017 that he did not post the videos to YouTube for a multitude of reasons, including his friends not being present on the platform.

=== Nas Daily Official YouTube channel ===
In 2019, he started to upload old videos of his on his official YouTube channel Nas Daily Official. The videos are shot using an SLR camera with an attached microphone, and are then edited before being released the next day. On average, each video takes around six hours to shoot and three hours to edit. In the beginning, the topics for Yassin's video were suggestions provided by his Facebook followers.

Yassin's collaborators included his then girlfriend Alyne Tamir, an American Israeli video-maker of Mormon and Jewish background, and Agon Hare, a video blogger and musician from Poland.

=== After Nas Daily ===
Yassin posted his 1000th video on 5 January 2019. On 1 February 2019, he started making one video per week, for a planned 100 weeks until the beginning of 2021.

In 2019, Yassin published Around the World in 60 Seconds, a memoir documenting his 1,000-day journey through 64 countries and his experience creating daily one-minute travel videos. The book combines travel accounts with profiles of people and communities he encountered, alongside reflections on cultural differences, stereotypes, and his own background and worldview. Kirkus Reviews described it as "a passionate introduction to Yassin’s worldview", praising Yassin’s "genuine passion for digging beyond the usual tourist stops". Yassin described the book as "much closer to a Humans of New York than a Lonely Planet," explaining that "this isn’t a travel book; it’s a book about humans." He also released a series of podcasts.

Since 2020, he has since launched various media related companies. In 2020, Yassin created Nas Academy, a school for video creators and Nas Studios, a video-production studio.

By 2022, he had over 60 million followers throughout his social media accounts and employed 120 staff.

==== Nas Academy ====
Through Nas Academy, He launched training programs to teach content creators digital skills, sometimes in partnership with other brands like ONE Championship. When the Nas Academy's Next Nas Daily training program was launched in the United Arab Emirates after he moved there, a batch of 80 Arab content creators was to be recruited into a six-month paid training stint. The Boycott, Divestment and Sanctions campaign claimed that the training programme was aimed to encourage normalization of relations with Israel. Separately, Al Jazeera's AJ+ Arabi published a video with similar criticisms. Yassin responded claiming that the Al Jazeera's video was "fake news targeted at [them] by the government".

In July 2021, Nas Academy raised US$12,000,000 (equivalent to $16,828,526 in 2025), making a total of US$23,000,000 (equivalent to $32,254,675 in 2025) raised thus far.

In August 2021, Nas Academy removed an online course featuring Filipino traditional tattoo artist Whang-od after disputes arose over the validity of the partnership and informed consent. Following a review by the National Commission on Indigenous Peoples, representatives from Nas Academy formally apologized to the community in October 2021, and the agreement was voided.

==== Other ventures ====
In 2023, Nas.io was created to enable content creators to earn income beyond the typical social media platforms. In 2025, Yassin launched 1000 Media, a digital marketing agency which uses artificial intelligence to enhance content creation and efficiency and produce unique original content following the signature Nas Daily style.

== Personal life ==
In 2018, Yassin said a DNA test, among other things, revealed that he was 59% Middle Eastern, 17% Caucasus and 1% of European Jewish ancestry. As an Arab citizen of Israel, Yassin's identity has long incorporated both his Palestinian heritage and his Israeli citizenship. Yassin has called himself "Palestinian-Israeli" as "I thought this term reflected who I was. Palestinian first. Israeli second." By August 2022, however, he'd described himself in an interview as "Israeli-Palestinian" and in October 2023, following the October 7 attacks by Hamas, tweeted "I view myself as an "Israeli-Palestinian." Israeli first. Palestinian second."

Yassin is a vegetarian and has undertaken fitness challenges to improve his health. He previously lived in Singapore and moved to Dubai, United Arab Emirates in 2020 after the relations between Israel and UAE had normalized.

On 22 May 2023, Yassin announced he broke up with his partner Alyne Tamir after six years of dating. However, both of them stated that Alyne and Yassin will remain as friends.

In 2022, Yassin obtained citizenship from Saint Kitts and Nevis, allowing him to travel to countries that do not recognise Israeli passports, such as Malaysia.

In May 2025, Yassin received an honorary doctorate from the Ben-Gurion University of the Negev for his advocacy for Israel, and advocacy for the coexistence of Arabs in Israel.

== Views ==
=== On technology ===
Yassin has argued that social media is weakening traditional media gatekeepers and shifting influence toward individual creators, who can increasingly bypass established institutions to reach audiences directly. He similarly believes that education need not depend on traditional institutions, saying that students do not necessarily need "a brick-and-mortar university" if they can learn directly from individual teachers and creators.

Yassin has also criticized the concentration of opportunity within Israel's technology sector. He referred to the "PayPal Mafia" and what he described as "generational company creation", arguing that the benefits of Israel’s technology economy should be more broadly accessible. He identified Arabs, Haredi Jews, and Ethiopian Jews among communities that he believed should have greater opportunities to participate in the sector.

=== On Israel and Palestine ===
Yassin has described his experience as an Arab Israeli as "bittersweet". He has said that his Israeli identity can be both an advantage and a source of hostility among international audiences, particularly when Israel is associated with conflict. He said he has sought to use his platform to present perspectives on the region without making Nas Daily primarily a vehicle for political activism.

In October 2022, Yassin addressed his position on the Israeli–Palestinian conflict in a video, acknowledging violence and suffering on "both sides," calling for people to come together, and supporting a two-state solution in which Israel and Palestine would coexist as independent states. Some Palestinian content creators criticised the video as "simplistic". Subhi Taha said "it's not fair to clump" this conflict with others and Palestinian political analyst Omar Baddar said that the video was missing the "sense of the overwhelming disparity in the scale of suffering and violence" and the reason for the violence, "the political injustice."

In October 2024, pro-Palestinian activists disrupted a meetup hosted by Yassin in Tokyo, Japan, accusing him of whitewashing Israel's actions in Gaza and acting as a tool of propaganda. In response to the confrontation, Yassin posted a statement on X stating, "I told them I agreed with them. I also want a Free Palestine from Hamas. Free Palestine from terrorism. Free Palestine from radical religion. They disagreed. They just wanted a Free Palestine from Jews."

In October 2025, in an interview with Al Arabiya, Yassin stated that the defeat of Hamas is the "best thing that can happen to the Palestinians and Palestine". In an interview on LBC with Tom Swarbrick on 30 November 2025, Yassin stated that the worst thing for a Palestinian is not Israel but Hamas, and referred to Hamas as "terrorists". He also dismissed allegations of apartheid in Israel, saying that it "is not like South Africa", and called the term "Gaza genocide" as "a very emotional, non-scientific word". Yassin has made similar statements previously at other engagements.

Interviewed at the David Merage Foundation for Confronting Antisemitism in Denver in October 2026, Yassin said that "anti-Zionism is a form of antisemitism" and that while he was "not a fan" of the current government of Israel, he felt that negative reaction to Israel and its government were "absolutely fueled by antisemitism" from people who "just really don't like Jews". Calling himself a "village boy" from a small Israeli community, he stated that his success as a citizen of Israel is tied to "the success of Israel and the Jewish people". At the same event, Yassin said that the Israeli-Palestinian conflict was "not a big deal" compared to other conflicts elsewhere, and that the only thing making it a big deal is that the Palestinians have "the perfect enemy, the most hated type of enemy, which is the Jews."

According to Dina Rezk in The Conversation, Yassin's viewpoints originate from a place of privilege as a Palestinian residing in Israel. His central message framed the conflict as involving responsibility on both sides. Rezk argues that Yassin's perspectives do not fully account for the political and military imbalance between Israel and Palestine.
