= Ancestral domain =

Lands, territories and resources of indigenous peoples

Ancestral domain or ancestral lands are the lands, territories and resources of indigenous peoples, particularly in the Asia-Pacific region. The term differs from indigenous land rights, Aboriginal title or Native Title by directly indicating relationship to land based on ancestry, while domain indicates relationships beyond material lands and territories, including spiritual and cultural aspects that may not be acknowledged in land titles and legal doctrine about trading ownership.

== Concept ==
Indigenous peoples may prefer to be described as custodians or guardians of their ancestral domain or lands rather than as title owners or land owners.

The concept of individual property ownership and land tenure that can be traded was often introduced as part of colonialism. While the Western model of land ownership gives an individual the property right to control land as a commodity, indigenous conceptions have a cultural and spiritual character. They invoke a mutual responsibility and relationship between land and people.

Professor Michael Dodson AM described Aboriginal Australians' idea of country using the term during his Australian of the Year speech. He said:

For us, country is a word for all the values, places, resources, stories and cultural obligations associated with the area and its features. It in fact describes the entirety of our ancestral domains. So when we acknowledge traditional country, as increasingly people do so in Australia, it's no empty ritual: it's to acknowledge who we, the Aboriginal people, are and our place in this nation. In doing that, it seems to me, all Australians might have a clearer notion of who they are and where they stand in relation to their history and the land they live in.

== History ==
The term was used as early as the 1920s in the work of the International Labour Organization (ILO).

Initially, the ILO was concerned with the situation of indigenous and tribal peoples in their roles as workers in the overseas colonies of European powers. It became increasingly evident that indigenous peoples were exposed to severe labour exploitation and had a need for special protection in cases where they were expelled from their ancestral domains only to become seasonal, migrant, bonded or home-based labourers. This recognition led to adoption in 1930 of the ILO's Forced Labour Convention (No. 29).

Following the creation of the United Nations, the ILO with the participation of other parts of the UN system created the Indigenous and Tribal Populations Convention (No. 107). Convention No. 107 was adopted in 1957 as the first international treaty on this subject.

This involved the underlying assumption that the only possible future for indigenous and tribal peoples was integration into larger society, and that the state should make decisions regarding indigenous development. In 1986 an ILO committee of experts concluded that "the integrationist approach of the Convention was obsolete and that its application was detrimental in the modern world."

In 1988 and 1989, the revision of Convention No. 107 was on the agenda of the International Labour Conference (ILC) and in June 1989, the Indigenous and Tribal Peoples Convention (No. 169) was adopted.

This paved the way for the United Nations Declaration on the Rights of Indigenous Peoples in 2007.

== Documentation ==
Indigenous peoples in Asia, India and Indonesia have set up The Ancestral Domain Registration Agency (BRWA) and the 2006 Forest Rights Act to advocate for land rights of Ancestral Indigenous Communities This mapping include documenting Ancestral Lands, Sacred Sites and Land Recognition, 5th and 6th Generation Ancestral Indigenous Land Registration Reclaimation geographically-linked traditional knowledge of land.

== Regional contexts ==
=== Indonesia ===
In 2013, the Indonesian Constitutional Court amended the 1999 Law on Forestry to return land rights to indigenous peoples whose ancestral lands are forested.

In Indonesia, there have been many land conflicts regarding indigenous community territories in resource-rich Kalimantan. According to data quoted in the Jakarta Post, following the enactment of the Masterplan for the Acceleration and Expansion of Indonesian Economic Development (MP3EI) in 2011, some 135 communities became involved in conflict with businesses. Many conflicts involve indigenous peoples' traditional cultures being uprooted by palm oil plantations, or logging or mining interests.

NGOs in Indonesia set up the Ancestral Domain Registration Agency. A community mapper said the agency was created to "be prepared for the court ruling. If it the Constitutional Court ruled that customary forests belonged to indigenous peoples, we wanted to be able to show where those customary forests were located."

=== Canada ===
The common term in Canada is "traditional territory". This can refer the entire homeland of a large ethnic group or the particular hunting and trapping grounds of a small band society. In areas where treaties have been signed, it refers to the land outside of Indian reserves in which a particular indigenous nation still claims an interest. In the case of specific rights to hunt and fish in a territory, these are called "aboriginal rights" and are a separate legal category from "treaty rights". In the case of areas where there are no treaties, such as most of British Columbia, the Supreme Court of Canada has ruled that aboriginal title applies to the entirety of a nation's claimed homeland, and not just to the particular locations of villages and other intensely-used sites. This was a unanimous ruling by the court in the 2017 case Tsilhqot'in Nation v British Columbia. However, in that same year, the Canadian court rejected the spiritual use of a site as being sufficient to establish aboriginal title, in Ktunaxa Nation v British Columbia (Forests, Lands and Natural Resource Operations).

=== Philippines ===
In the Philippines, the term is used to refer to indigenous peoples' land rights in law. Ancestral lands are referred to in the Philippines Constitution. Article XII, Section 5 says: "The State, subject to the provisions of this Constitution and national development policies and programs, shall protect the rights of indigenous cultural communities to their ancestral lands to ensure their economic, social, and cultural well-being."

The Indigenous People's Rights Act of 1997 recognizes the right of Indigenous peoples to manage their ancestral domains. The law defines ancestral domain to include lands, inland waters, coastal areas, and natural resources owned or occupied by Indigenous peoples, by themselves or through their ancestors.

The Food and Agriculture Organization's research on forest land ownership in the Philippines found conflicts in institutional mandates among the Local Government Code, mining law and the National Integrated Protected Areas Act, and recommended exclusive resource use rights to community-based forest management communities.

In the 2022 State of the Indigenous Peoples Address Report, the Legal Rights and Natural Resources Center states that 1.25 million hectares of indigenous lands are threatened by destructive projects that will cause massive ecological disturbance, including biodiversity loss, and air, water, and land pollution.

== See also ==
- Free, prior and informed consent
- Indigenous law
