= Ktunaxa Nation v British Columbia (Forests, Lands and Natural Resource Operations) =

Supreme Court of Canada decision

Ktunaxa Nation v. British Columbia (Forests, Lands and Natural Resource Operations)
- Supreme Court of Canada

Hearing: December 1, 2016 Judgment: November 2, 2017
- Citations: 2017 SCC 54
- Prior history: on appeal from the court of appeal for British Columbia
- Ruling: Appeal dismissed.

Holding
- Freedom of religion protects people and their actions, but not the sites where religious ceremonies occur.

Court membership
- Chief Justice: Beverley McLachlin; Puisne Justices: Rosalie Abella, Michael Moldaver, Andromache Karakatsanis, Richard Wagner, Clément Gascon, Suzanne Côté, Russell Brown, Malcolm Rowe

Reasons given

Ktunaxa Nation v. British Columbia (Forests, Lands and Natural Resource Operations) is a decision of the Supreme Court of Canada which concerns whether or not a First Nation can block real estate development on sacred sites by virtue of the concepts of freedom of religion and the duty to consult and accommodate (the honour of the Crown).

The majority held that the Ktunaxa Nation's rights were not violated by the decision of the province of British Columbia to allow the Jumbo Glacier ski resort to expand into area within Ktunaxa territory known as Qat’muk where Grizzly Bear Spirit is believed to live. This is because the belief in Grizzly Bear Spirit and the ability to act upon it were not impinged, only the location, and so is not within the scope of s.2 of the Charter. The majority held that the Ktunaxa still do have a S.35 right to be consulted and accommodated regarding lands where there has been no proven Aboriginal title, but that a religious connection could not be invoked to establish title in the context of overturning an administrative decision. Ktunaxa title to the area would have to be tried separately.

The minority held that the duty to consult and accommodated was met, but that freedom of religion was impinged. However the provincial minister's infringement on freedom of religion was reasonable under s.1, and so the application for an injunction could be denied by the lower courts.
