= Tinglayan =

Municipality in Kalinga, Philippines

- Municipality
- Municipality of Tinglayan
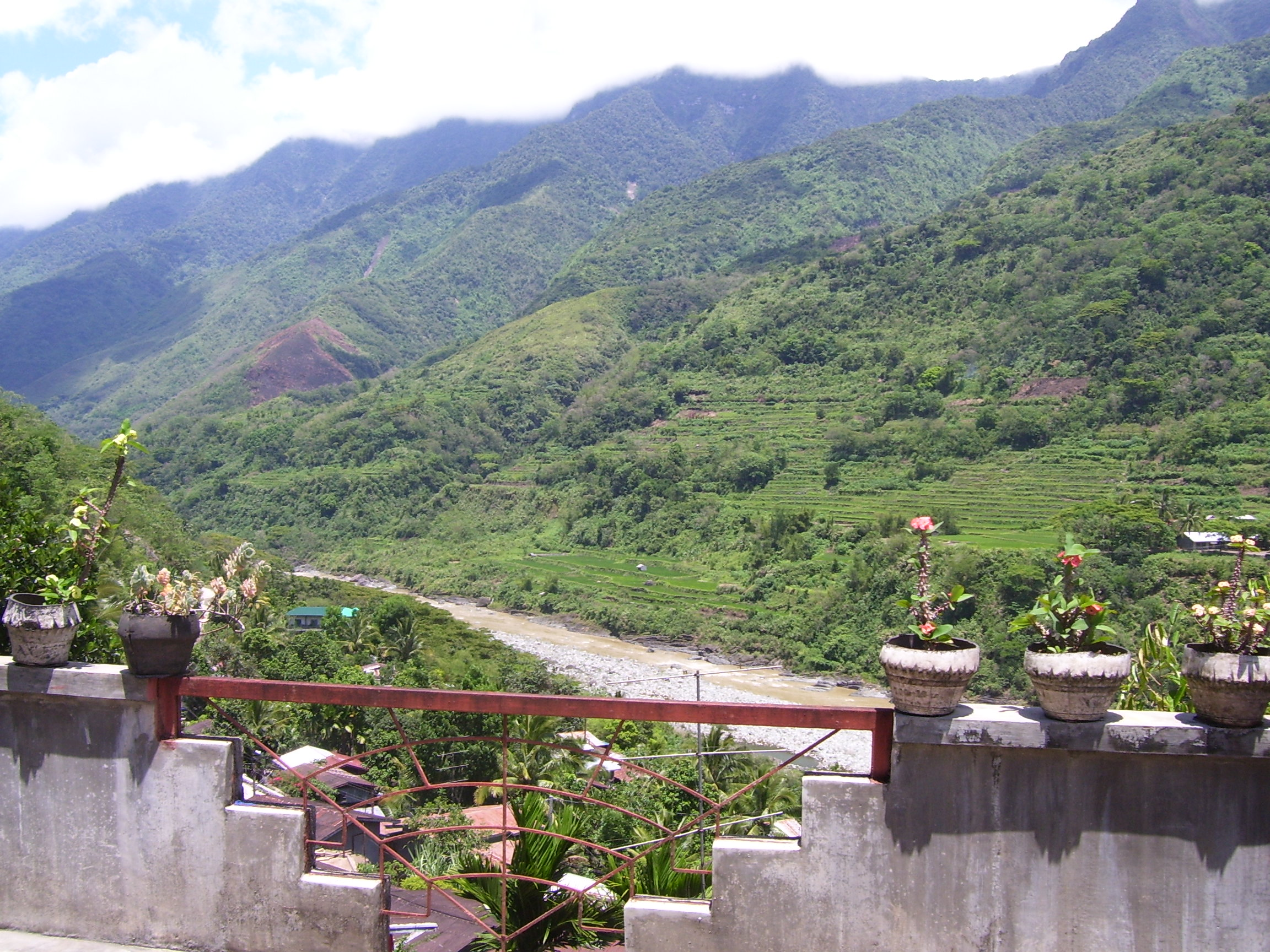
- Chico River Valley

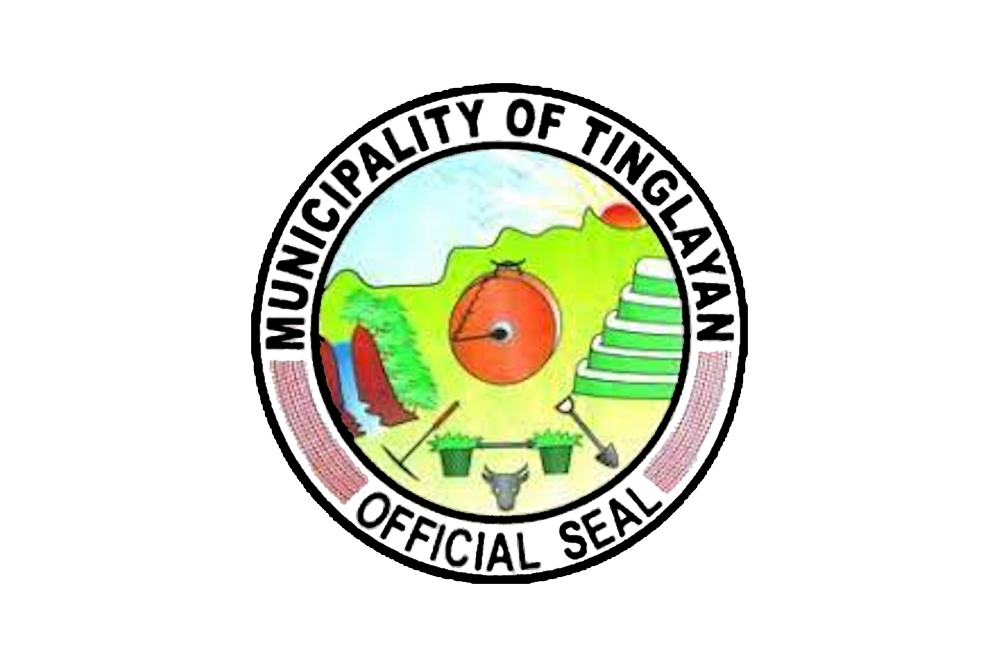
- Flag

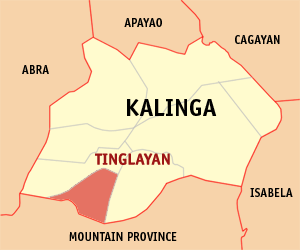
- Map of Kalinga with Tinglayan highlighted
- Interactive map of Tinglayan
- Location within the Philippines
- Coordinates: 17°15′54″N 121°08′56″E
- Country: Philippines
- Region: Cordillera Administrative Region
- Province: Kalinga
- District: Lone district
- Barangays: 20 (see Barangays)

Government
  - Type: Sangguniang Bayan
  - Mayor: Charles A. Abay
  - Vice Mayor: Alexander B. Malasi
  - Representative: Caroline B. Agyao
  - Municipal Council: Members: Regina O. Banglag; Jaime N. Tuguic; Francisco N. Ando; Matthew W. Awis; Camilo P. Sa-ing; Samuel A. Saguilot; Brendon D. Gonnay; Ramon C. Dungoc
  - Electorate: 11,260 voters (2025)

Area
  - Total: 283.00 km^{2} (109.27 sq mi)
- Elevation: 1,074 m (3,524 ft)
- Highest elevation: 2,200 m (7,200 ft)
- Lowest elevation: 443 m (1,453 ft)

Population (2024 census)
  - Total: 13,311
  - Density: 47.035/km^{2} (121.82/sq mi)
  - Households: 2,453

Economy
  - Income class: 3rd municipal income class
  - Poverty incidence: 8.72% (2023)
  - Revenue: ₱ 183.6 million (2024)
  - Assets: ₱ 273.4 million (2024)
  - Expenditure: ₱ 179.4 million (2024)
- Time zone: UTC+8 (PST)
- ZIP code: 3804
- PSGC: 1403215000
- IDD : area code: +63 (0)74
- Native languages: Kalinga; Ilocano; Tagalog
- Website: https://tinglayan.gov.ph

Tinglayan, officially the Municipality of Tinglayan, is a municipality in the province of Kalinga, Philippines. According to the 2024 census, it has a population of 13,311 people.

It is sometimes called Buscalan, based on its prominent barangay of the same name where tourists often visit Apo Whang-Od for their tattoos.

== Geography ==
Tinglayan is situated 62.45 kilometres (38.80 mi) from the provincial capital Tabuk, and 433.29 kilometres (269.23 mi) from the country's capital city of Manila.

=== Barangays ===
Tinglayan is politically subdivided into 20 barangays. Each barangay consists of puroks and some have sitios.

- Ambato-Legleg
- Bangad Centro
- Basao
- Belong Manubal
- Bugnay
- Buscalan
- Butbut
- Dananao
- Loccong
- Lower Bangad
- Luplupa
- Mallango
- Ngibat
- Old Tinglayan
- Poblacion
- Sumadel 1
- Sumadel 2
- Tulgao East
- Tulgao West
- Upper Bangad

=== Climate ===
Climate data for Tinglayan, Kalinga
Month	Jan	Feb	Mar	Apr	May	Jun	Jul	Aug	Sep	Oct	Nov	Dec	Year
Mean daily maximum °C (°F)	25 (77)	26 (79)	28 (82)	30 (86)	29 (84)	29 (84)	28 (82)	28 (82)	28 (82)	27 (81)	26 (79)	25 (77)	27 (81)
Mean daily minimum °C (°F)	17 (63)	18 (64)	19 (66)	21 (70)	22 (72)	23 (73)	22 (72)	22 (72)	22 (72)	20 (68)	20 (68)	19 (66)	20 (69)
Average precipitation mm (inches)	23 (0.9)	28 (1.1)	33 (1.3)	64 (2.5)	232 (9.1)	242 (9.5)	258 (10.2)	266 (10.5)	245 (9.6)	201 (7.9)	87 (3.4)	69 (2.7)	1,748 (68.7)
Average rainy days	8.3	8.0	10.8	15.2	23.7	26.1	27.0	25.8	23.5	17.3	13.7	12.1	211.5
Source: Meteoblue

== Demographics ==
Population census of Tinglayan
Year	Pop.	±% p.a.
1918	2,879	—
1939	6,868	+4.23%
1948	6,935	+0.11%
1960	9,135	+2.32%
1970	10,317	+1.22%
1975	10,838	+0.99%
1980	11,703	+1.55%
1990	12,637	+0.77%
1995	13,591	+1.37%
2000	14,164	+0.89%
2007	11,619	−2.69%
2010	12,557	+2.87%
2015	12,868	+0.47%
2020	13,148	+0.45%
Source: Philippine Statistics Authority

In the 2024 census, the population of Tinglayan was 13,148 people, with a density of 46 inhabitants per square kilometre or 120 inhabitants per square mile.

== Economy ==
Poverty incidence of Tinglayan (%)

Source: Philippine Statistics Authority

Tinglayan's economy drives on agriculture and micro-enterprises. Rice, corn, coffee, and root crops serve as major sources of agriculture in Tinglayan. The One Town, One Product facility was opened in the municipality.

== Government ==
=== Local government ===
Tinglayan, belonging to the lone congressional district of the province of Kalinga, is governed by a mayor designated as its local chief executive and by a municipal council as its legislative body in accordance with the Local Government Code. The mayor, vice mayor, and the councilors are elected directly by the people through an election which is being held every three years.

=== Elected officials ===
Members of the Municipal Council (2025–2028)
Position	Name
Congressman	Caroline B. Agyao
Mayor	Charles A. Abay
Vice-Mayor	Alexander B. Malasi
Councilors	Regina O. Banglag
Councilors	Jaime N. Tuguic
Councilors	Francisco N. Ando
Councilors	Matthew W. Awis
Councilors	Camilo P. Sa-ing
Councilors	Samuel A. Saguilot
Councilors	Brendon D. Gonnay
Councilors	Ramon C. Dungoc

== Tourism ==
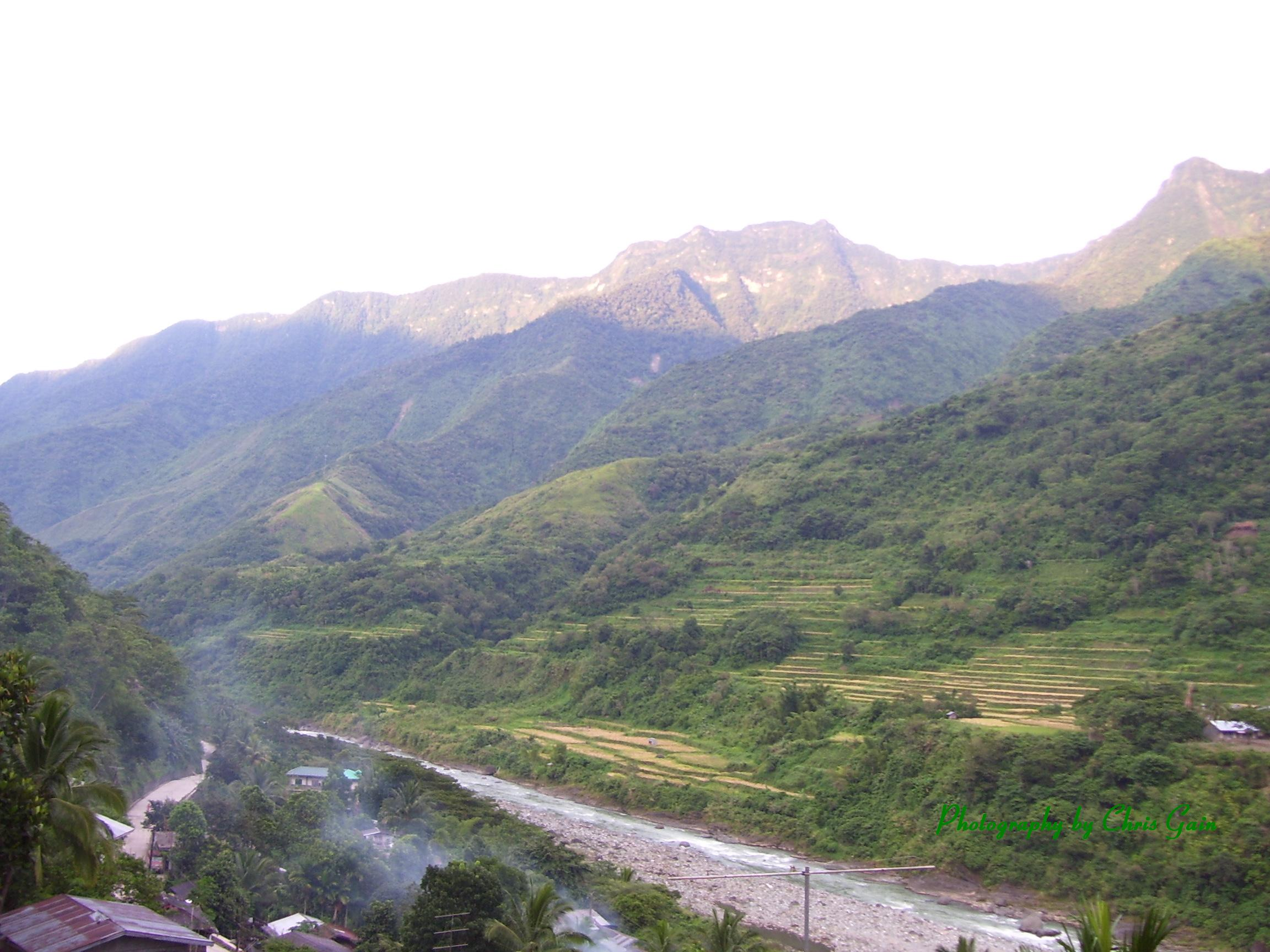
Sleeping Beauty mountain

Tinglayan is famous for its local celebrity, Whang-od, who is the last mambabatok (traditional tattooist). Tourists often visit Brgy. Buscalan, Tinglayan to see her and have their bodies tattooed.

== Education ==
The Tinglayan Schools District Office governs all educational institutions within the municipality. It oversees the management and operations of all private and public, from primary to secondary schools.

=== Primary and elementary schools ===
- Ambato-Legleg Elementary School
- Balay Elementary School
- Bangad Centro Elementary School
- Bangad Elementary School
- Basao Elementary School
- Belong Elementary School
- Bugnay Elementary School
- Buscalan Elementary School
- Butbut Elementary School
- Dalkinsan Elementary School
- Dananao Elementary School
- Loccong Elementary School
- Luplupa Elementary School
- Mallango Elementary School
- Manubal Elementary School
- Maswa Elementary School
- Ngibat Elementary School
- Sumadel Elementary School
- Tinglayan Central School
- Tinglayan Elementary School
- Tulgao Elementary School

=== Secondary schools ===
- Bangad National High School
- Southern Tinglayan National High School
- St. Theresita's High School - Tinglayan
- Sumadel National High School
- Tinglayan National High School
- Tulgao West Integrated School
