= National Commission on Indigenous Peoples =

Philippine government agency

National Commission on Indigenous People
- Pambansang Komisyon sa mga Katutubong Mamamayan
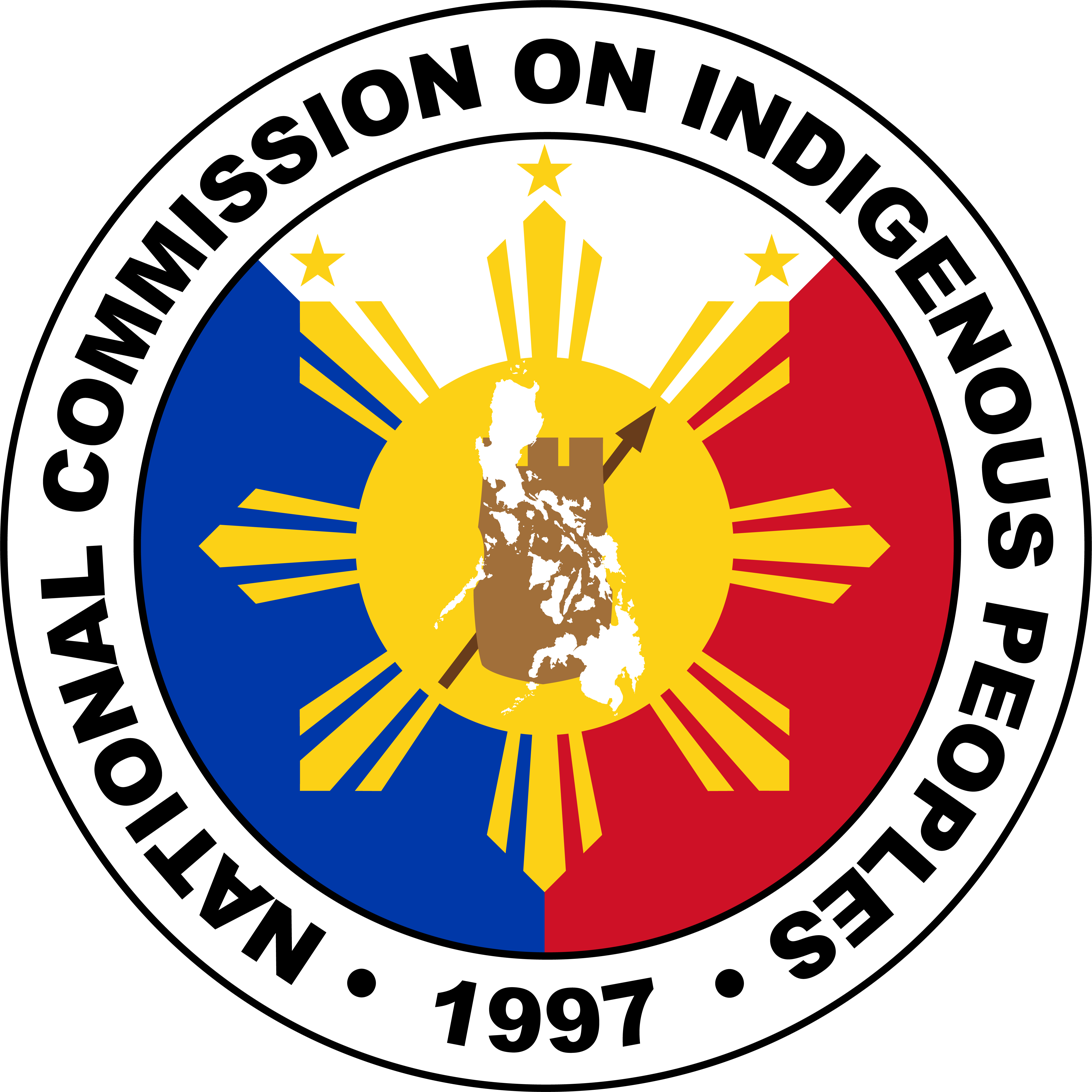

Agency overview
- Formed: October 22, 1997
- Headquarters: Quezon City, Philippines
- Employees: 1,421 (2024)
- Annual budget: ₱1.11 billion (2020)
- Agency executives: Nancy Catamco, Chairperson; Mervyn H. Espadero, Executive Director
- Parent Agency: Office of the President of the Philippines
- Website: ncip.gov.ph

The National Commission on Indigenous Peoples (NCIP; Filipino: Pambansang Komisyon sa mga Katutubong Mamamayan) is the agency of the national government of the Philippines that is responsible for protecting the rights of the indigenous peoples of the Philippines. The commission is composed of seven commissioners. It is attached to the Department of Social Welfare and Development.

The NCIP is tasked with accrediting indigenous people's organizations and with the processing and issuing of Certificate of Ancestral Domain Title and Certificate of Ancestral Land Title.

== History ==
The commission began as the Bureau of Non-Christian Tribes created by the Insular Government during the American Colonial Period of the Philippines. It then became an independent agency called the Commission on National Integration (CNI). In 1972, then President Ferdinand Marcos split CNI into the Southern Philippine Development Authority (SPDA) and the Presidential Assistance on National Minorities (PANAMIN), which was later accused of facilitating the exploitation of natural resources on ancestral lands. In 1984, Marcos created the Office of Muslim Affairs and Cultural Communities (OMACC) to assist both Muslim and non-Muslim minorities.

In January 1987, then President Corazon Aquino's administration abolished the OMACC and through three Executive Orders created the Office for the Muslim Affairs (OMA), the Office for Northern Cultural Communities (ONCC), and the Office for Southern Cultural Communities (OSCC).

In 1997, then President Fidel Ramos signed Republic Act 8371 or Indigenous Peoples' Rights Act of 1997, which merged the latter two offices, the Office for Northern Cultural Communities and Office for Southern Cultural Communities into current commission.

The NCIP was under the supervision of the Department of Social Welfare and Development until 2024, when it was transferred to the Office of the President of the Philippines through Executive Order No. 71 signed by President Bongbong Marcos.

== Criticism ==
=== 2011 Mangyan evictions case ===
In 2011, the commission's Oriental Mindoro office was criticized after it made a meeting with indigenous Mangyan communities in Mindoro, where the commission was pushing for the removal of the indigenous Mangyans from their ancestral domains for the establishment of a landfill proposed by the local government of Puerto Galera. The Mangyan walked out of the meeting, sparking outrage from the top officers of the commission. The news broke out and the national commission itself dropped all its social media accounts and even its own website, leaving only the websites of some branch offices operational. Since it was criticized by the public, the commission's Oriental Mindoro office has been in a limbo state, with no actual programs being done. The head commissioner continues to govern the commission, along with the provincial officer, despite the status quo, surging to further criticisms. Provincial officer of NCIP Oriental Mindoro Karen Ignacio and Puerto Galera mayor Hubbert Dolor retaliated by using the IPRA Law as defense for the establishment of the landfill against the indigenous Mangyan people. The IPRA Law is the same law that was made to protect the rights of indigenous peoples in 1997.

==== Gaps in the law ====
Section 56 of the Indigenous Peoples' Rights Act of 1997 or the IPRA Law states that "property rights within the ancestral domains already existing and/or vested upon effectivity of this Act, shall be recognized and respected." This section is problematic as it means that any title before 1997 holds more weight than an ancestral claim. Scholars and pro-indigenous groups have criticized this section as it effectively destroys any ancestral land claim before 1997. Historians have pointed out that most indigenous groups in the Philippines have been in the archipelago prior to Spanish occupation in the 15th century. However, according to Section 56, since there is no proper documentation committed by the indigenous people prior to 1997, an indigenous group cannot claim any land that have been in non-indigenous possession prior to 1997. This makes multi-national companies and local government units have the power to resist ancestral claims and use the IPRA Law itself to counter indigenous land claims, as testified in an ongoing Mangyan case since 2011, which evicted indigenous Mangyans from a claimed land they have been using for many years. In 2015, it was announced that the indigenous land shall be made into a sanitary landfill by the Puerto Galera local government unit, and that the Mangyans shall be relocated into a site near the landfill itself. All Mangyan-planted coconut trees on the landfill site shall be chopped down by the government and the local government unit shall compensate only 100 pesos (approximately 2 US dollars) each to the Mangyans.

=== 2019 Chico river project case ===
On May 16, 2019, amid national outrage after the anti-indigenous Chico river dam project was approved by the government, the NCIP called on to stop the project for a moment as they have yet to release a certificate of approval as the area is an indigenous land of their constituents, the Kalinga ethnic people. On May 27, 2019, it was later revealed that the NCIP already released a certificate for the company to continue with the destructive Chico river dam project, mounting to indigenous protests. The locals have stated that the agency (NCIP), which was made to protect the rights of indigenous people, is now serving the greed of multi-national corporations, to the demise of the people that they were intended to serve. On May 28, 2019, the head of the NCIP, Leonor Quintayo, was replaced by Allen Capuyan, after government released a statement which verified that Quintayo was being investigated by the Presidential Anti-Corruption Commission for intensive corruption.
