= Central Visayas =

Administrative region of the Philippines

Central Visayas Tunga-tungang Kabisay-an Gitnang Visayas
- Region
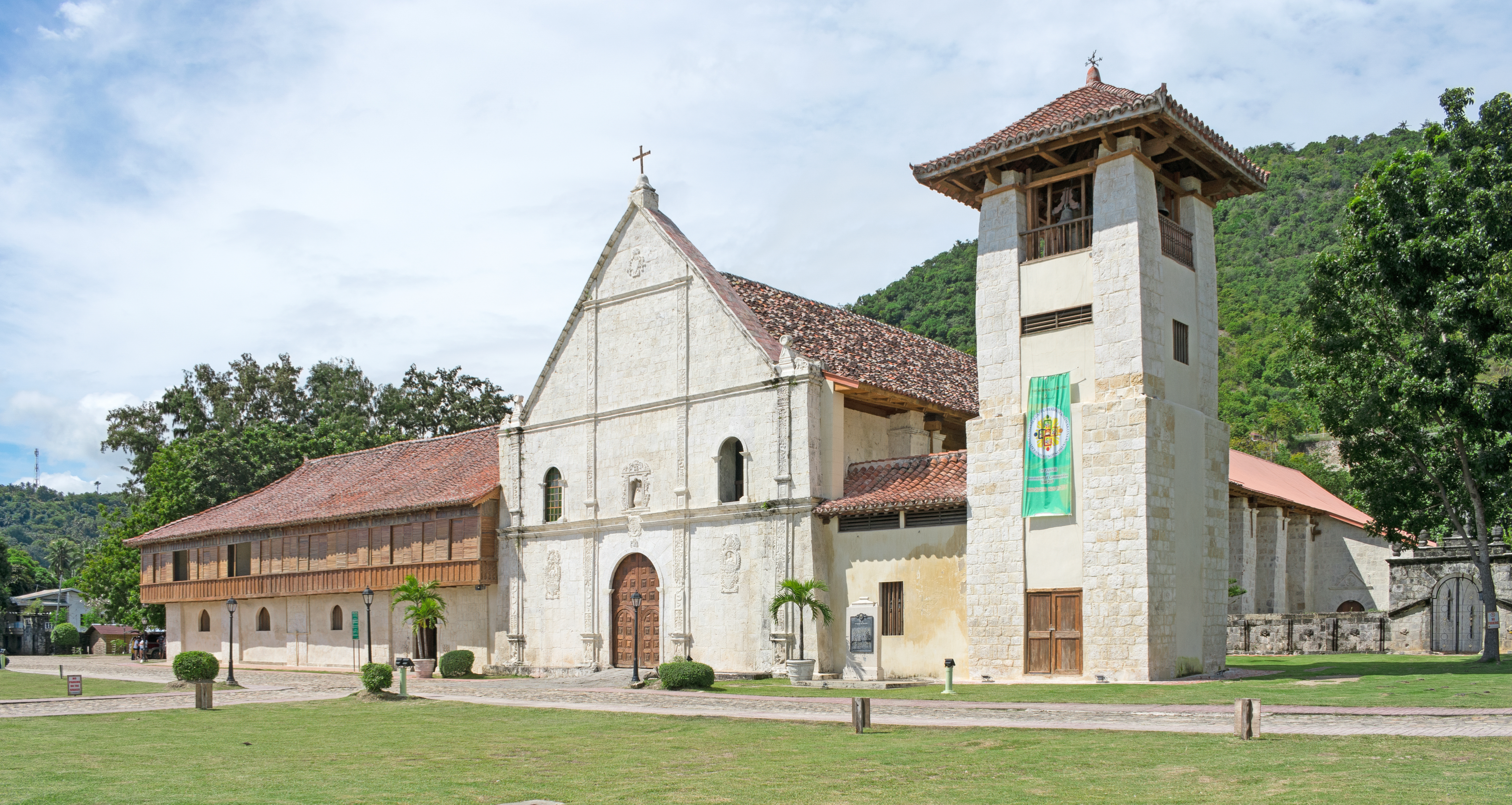
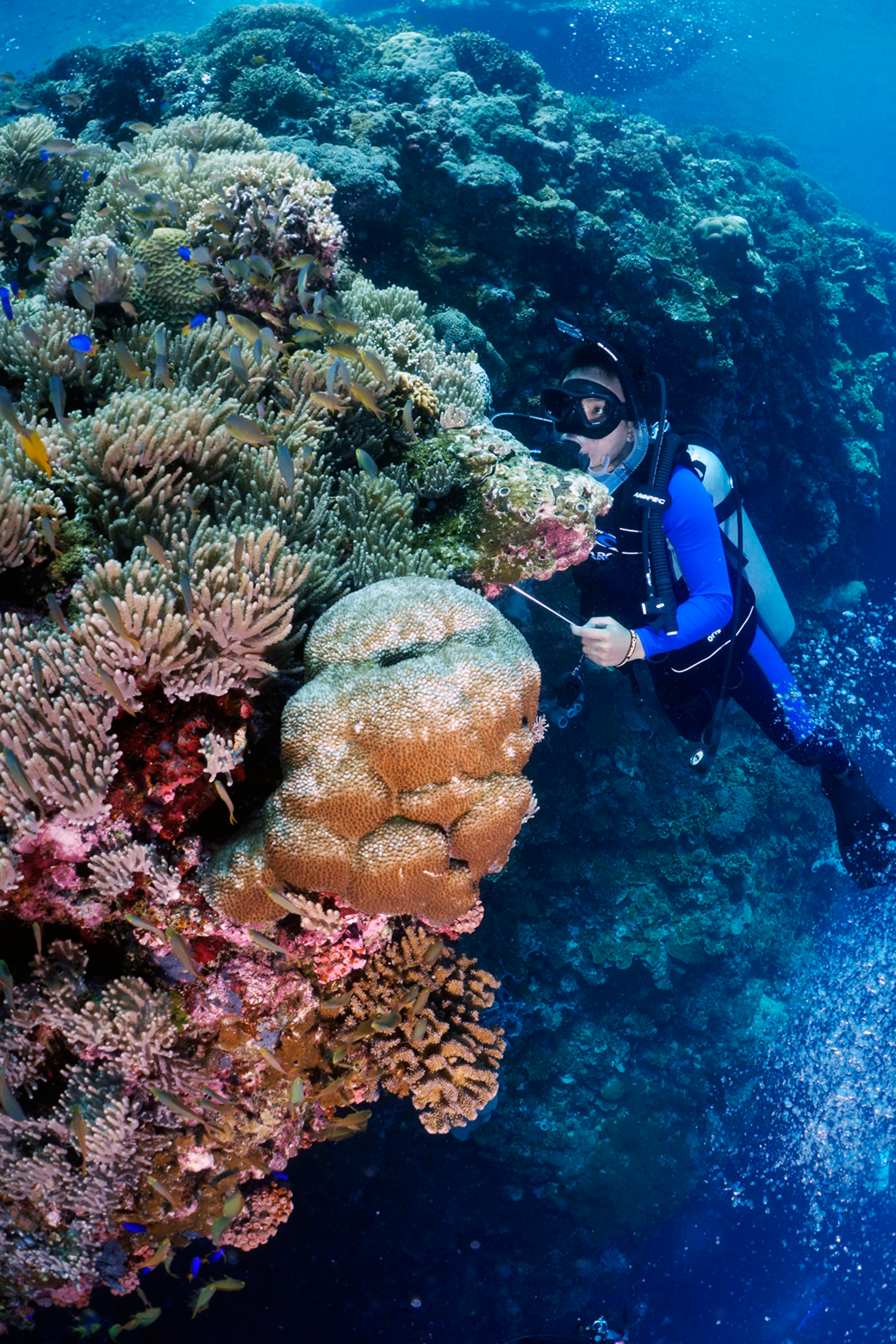
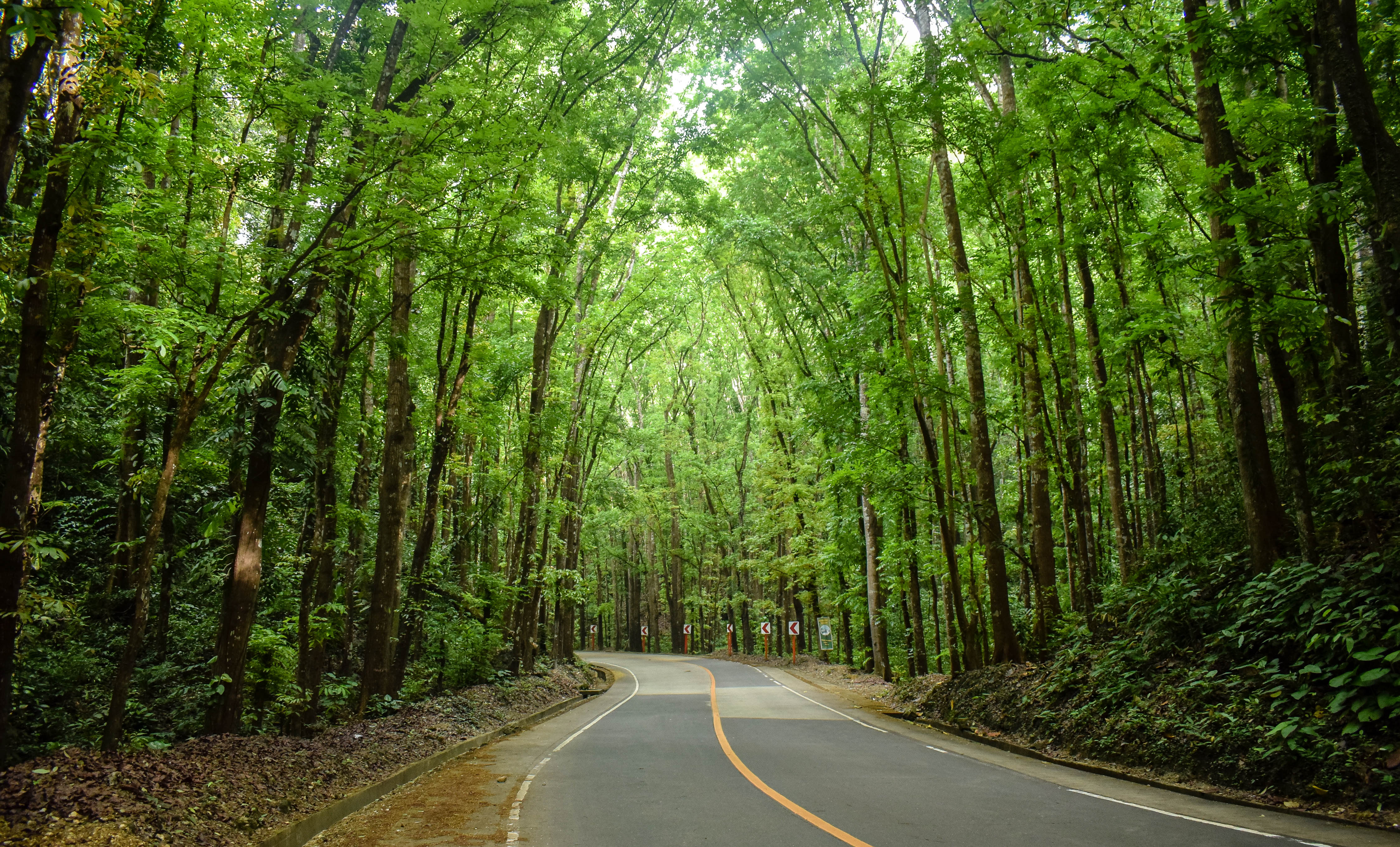
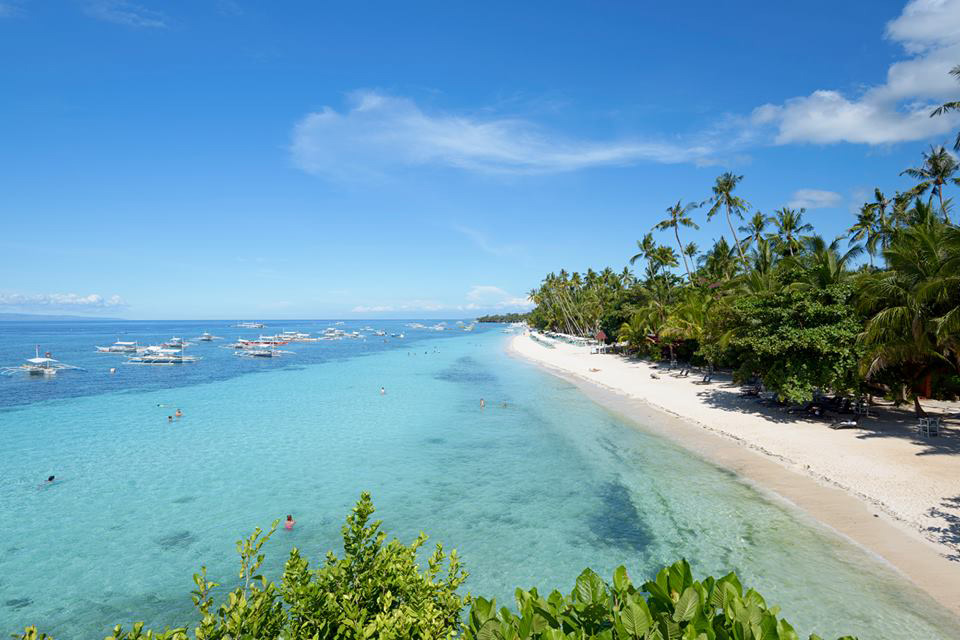
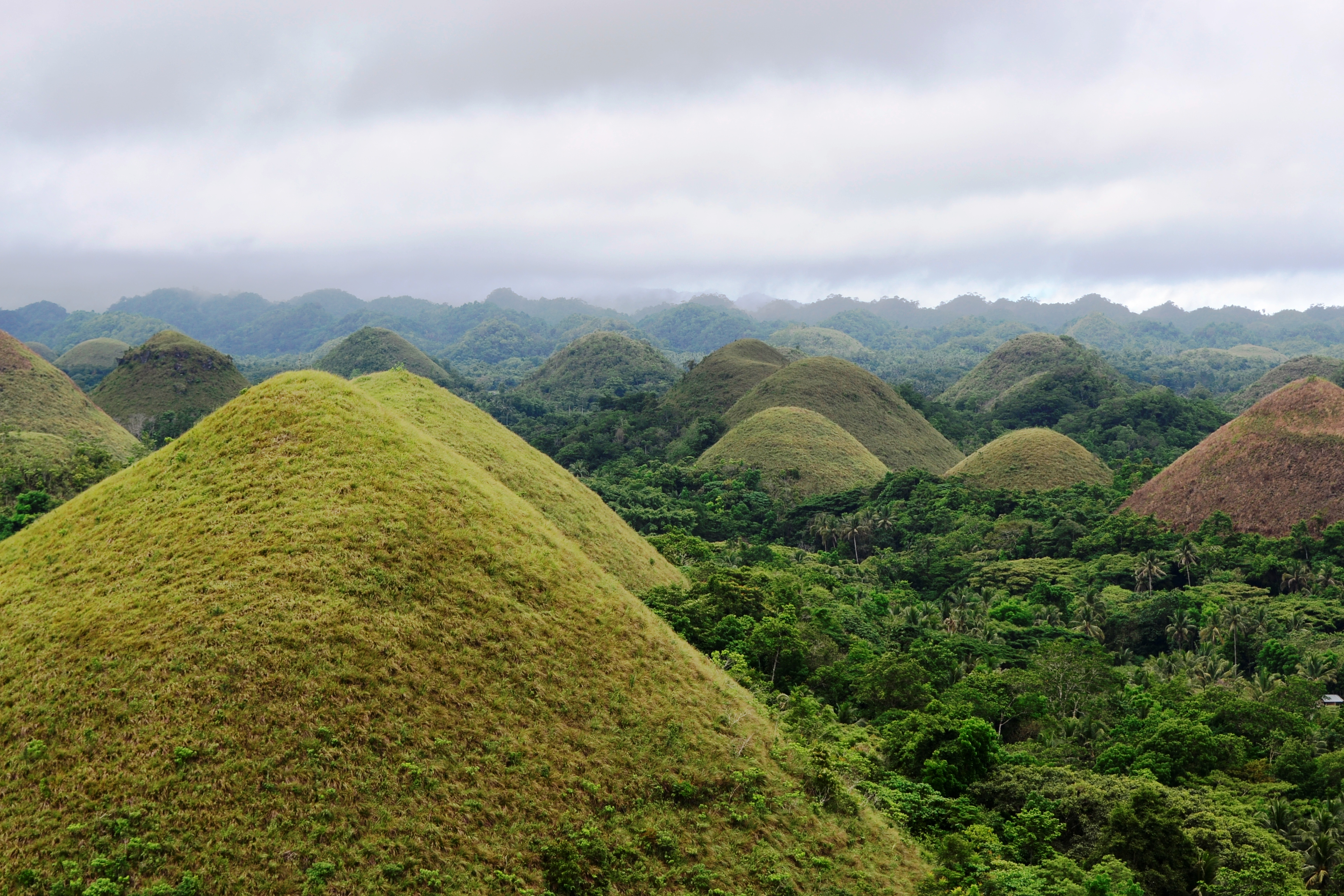
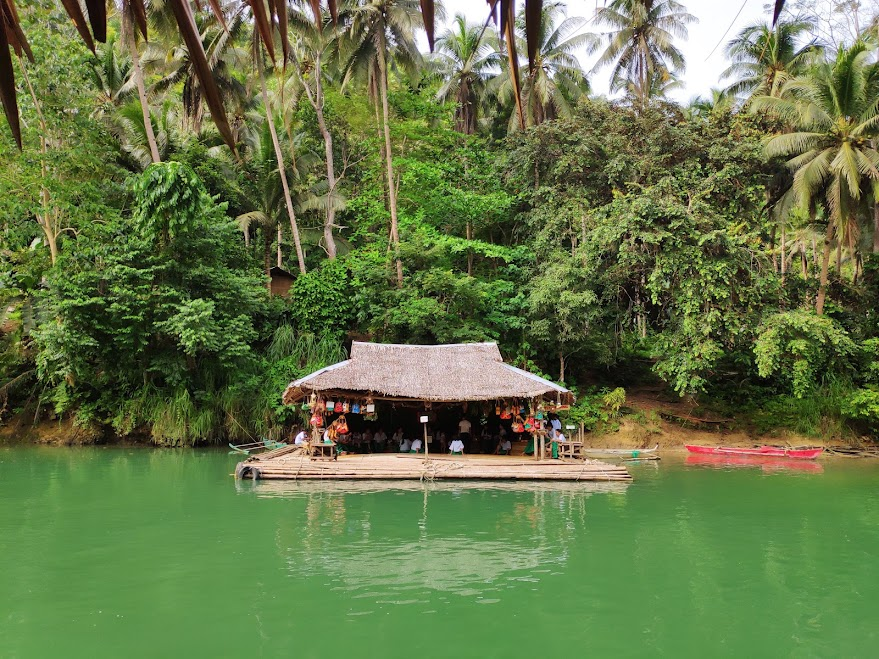
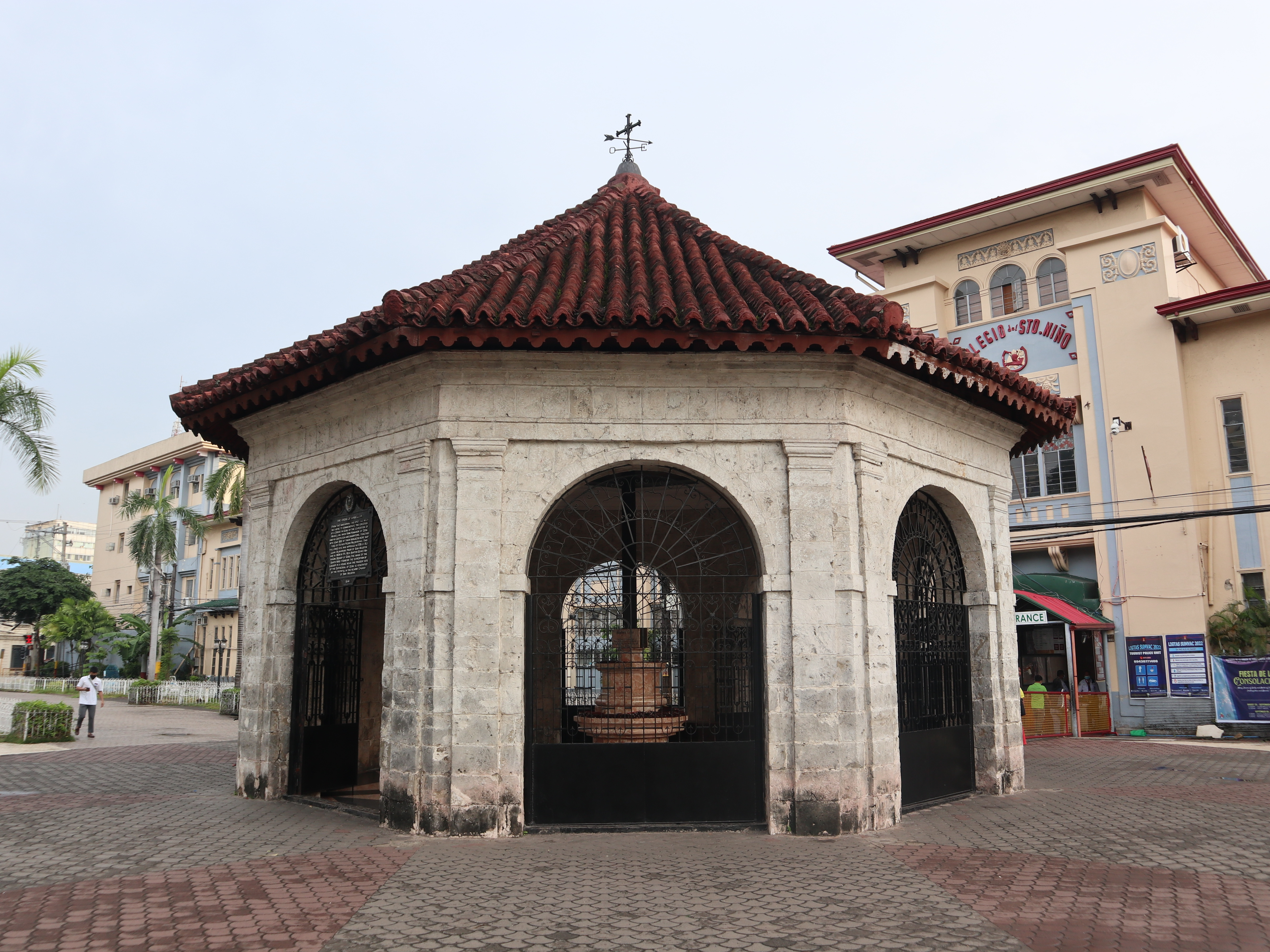
- Clockwise from the top: Boljoon Church, Rajah Sikatuna Protected Landscape, Chocolate Hills, Magellan's Cross, Loboc River, Panglao Island, Moalboal Reef
- Nicknames: Center of Christianity; Rehiyon sa mga Sugboanon (Region of the Cebuanos)
- Anthem: Awit sa DepEd Rehiyon Siete
- Location in the Philippines
- Interactive map of Central Visayas
- Coordinates: 10°N 124°E
- Country: Philippines
- Island group: Visayas
- Regional center and largest city: Cebu City

Area
  - Total: 10,114.52 km^{2} (3,905.24 sq mi)
- Highest elevation (Osmeña Peak): 1,072 m (3,517 ft)

Population (2024 census)
  - Total: 6,640,875
  - Density: 656.5685/km^{2} (1,700.505/sq mi)
  - Households: 1,966,588

Divisions
  - Provinces: 2: Bohol; Cebu
  - Independent cities: 3: Cebu City; Lapu-Lapu City; Mandaue
  - Component cities: 7: Bogo; Carcar; Danao; Naga; Tagbilaran; Talisay; Toledo
  - Municipalities: 91
  - Barangays: 2,312
  - Districts: 11

Economy
  - Poverty incidence: 8.7% (2025)
  - GDP total: US$26.1 billion (2024)
  - GDP per capita: US$3,834 (2024)
  - HDI (2023): 0.704 high · 12th of 17
- Time zone: UTC+8 (PST)
- PSGC: 070000000
- ISO 3166 code: PH-07
- Electorate: 4,389,344 voters (2025)
- Languages: Cebuano; Boholano; Porohanon; Bantayanon; Filipino; English

Central Visayas (Cebuano: Tunga-tungang Kabisay-an; Tagalog: Gitnang Kabisayaan; Filipino: Gitnang Visayas), designated as Region VII, is an administrative region in the Philippines. With only two provinces: Cebu and Bohol, as well as three highly urbanized cities: Cebu City, Lapu-Lapu, and Mandaue, it has the fewest provinces of any region in the country. Despite this, it is the most populous region in the Visayas, with a population of 6,545,603.

The regional center, as well as its largest city, is Cebu City. The Cebuano language is the region's lingua franca. The region is also dominated by native speakers of three Visayan languages: Bantayanon, Boholano, and Porohanon.

In 2015, Central Visayas was redefined when the province of Negros Oriental was transferred to the newly formed Negros Island Region. However, the Negros Island Region was dissolved in 2017, returning Negros Oriental to Central Visayas. After seven years, Negros Oriental was transferred again, along with the island province of Siquijor, when the Negros Island Region was re-established in 2024.

== Etymology ==
The name of the region, Central Visayas, was mostly chosen by American colonists to denote the centrality of the islands within the bigger Visayas area.

There have been proposals to rename the current Central Visayas region, which is dominated by the Cebuano (Sugbuanon) ethnic group, to Sugbu, the former name of the region prior to Spanish colonization in the 16th century. The name refers to the former kingdom of the region, the Rajahnate of Cebu, or Sugbu in Cebuano.

== History ==
Regions first came into existence on September 24, 1972, when the provinces of the Philippines were organized into 11 regions by Presidential Decree No. 1 as part of the Integrated Reorganization Plan by President Ferdinand Marcos Sr. The provinces of Cebu, Bohol, and Negros Oriental (including its then-subprovince of Siquijor) were grouped together to form the Central Visayas region.

By virtue of Executive Order No. 183, s. 2015, issued on May 29, 2015, by President Benigno Aquino III, moved Negros Oriental to the newly formed Negros Island Region.

On August 9, 2017, President Rodrigo Duterte dissolved the Negros Island Region, revoking Executive Order No. 183, s. 2015 through the signing of Executive Order No. 38. This returned Negros Oriental to Central Visayas.

In 2024, Negros Oriental was again moved to the re-established Negros Island Region. Siquijor was also moved to the NIR through Republic Act No. 12000 signed by President Bongbong Marcos.

== Geography ==
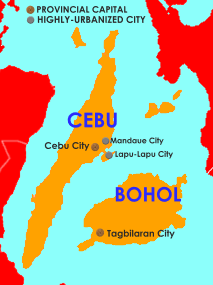
Political map of Central Visayas (since June 2024)

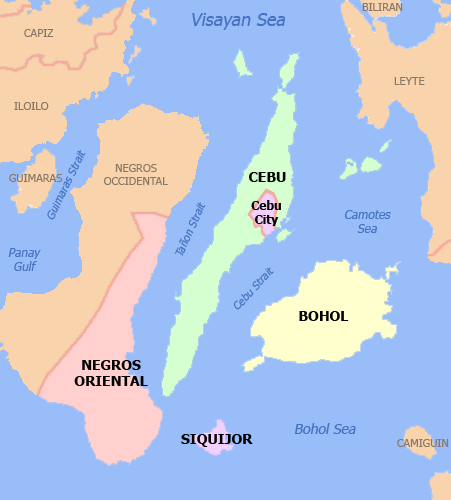
Former map of Central Visayas prior to the revival of Negros Island Region in June 2024

Central Visayas consists of the island provinces of Cebu and Bohol, as well as the three independent cities of Cebu City, Lapu-Lapu City, and Mandaue City. The region also includes the straits of Cebu and parts of the Tañon Strait. Its land area is 10,144.52 km^{2} (3,916.82 sq mi), 3.3% of the country's total land area.

Central Visayas is bounded on the north by the Visayan Sea, west by the provinces of Negros Occidental and Negros Oriental in Negros island, south by the Bohol Sea and the province of Siquijor, and east by the Camotes Sea and the island of Leyte in Eastern Visayas.

== Administrative divisions ==
=== Provinces ===
Central Visayas consists of 2 provinces, 3 highly urbanized cities, 7 component cities, 91 municipalities, and 2,312 barangays.

Province or HUC		Capital	Population (2020)		Area		Density		Cities	Muni.	Barangay
					km^{2}	sq mi	/km^{2}	/sq mi			
Bohol		Tagbilaran	21.3%	1,394,329	4,772.52	1,842.68	290	750	1	47	1,109
Cebu		Cebu City	50.8%	3,325,385	4,943.72	1,908.78	670	1,700	6	44	1,066
Cebu City	†	—	14.7%	964,169	315.00	121.62	3,100	8,000	—	—	80
Lapu-Lapu	†	—	7.6%	497,604	58.10	22.43	8,600	22,000	—	—	30
Mandaue	†	—	5.6%	364,116	25.18	9.72	14,500	38,000	—	—	27
Total				6,545,603	10,114.52	3,905.24	650	1,700	10	91	2,312
† Cebu City, Mandaue, and Lapu-Lapu are highly urbanized cities; figures are excluded from Cebu.

==== Governors and vice governors ====
Province	Image	Governor	Political Party	Vice Governor
Bohol		Erico Aristotle Aumentado	PFP	Nicanor S. Besas
Cebu		Pamela S. Baricuatro	PDP–Laban	Glenn Anthony O. Soco

=== Cities ===
- † Regional center

City	Population (2020)	Area		Density		City class	Income class	Province
		km^{2}	sq mi	/km^{2}	/sq mi			
Bogo	88,867	103.52	39.97	860	2,200	Component	6th	Cebu
Carcar	136,453	116.78	45.09	1,200	3,100	Component	5th	Cebu
† Cebu City	964,169	315.00	121.62	3,100	8,000	Highly urbanized	1st	Cebu
Danao	156,321	107.30	41.43	1,500	3,900	Component	3rd	Cebu
Lapu-Lapu	497,604	58.10	22.43	8,600	22,000	Highly urbanized	1st	Cebu
Mandaue	364,116	25.18	9.72	14,000	36,000	Highly urbanized	1st	Cebu
Naga	133,184	101.97	39.37	1,300	3,400	Component	3rd	Cebu
Tagbilaran	104,976	36.50	14.09	2,900	7,500	Component	3rd	Bohol
Talisay	263,048	39.87	15.39	6,800	18,000	Component	3rd	Cebu
Toledo	207,314	216.28	83.51	960	2,500	Component	3rd	Cebu

== Demographics ==
Population census of Central Visayas

Year	Pop.	±% p.a.
1903	1,124,444	—
1918	1,485,976	+1.88%
1939	1,954,366	+1.31%
1948	2,119,975	+0.91%
1960	2,522,802	+1.46%
1970	3,032,719	+1.86%

Year	Pop.	±% p.a.
1975	3,387,274	+2.24%
1980	3,787,374	+2.26%
1990	4,594,124	+1.95%
1995	5,014,588	+1.65%
2000	5,706,953	+2.81%
2007	6,400,698	+1.59%

Year	Pop.	±% p.a.
2010	6,800,180	+2.23%
2015	7,396,898	+1.61%
2020	8,081,988	+1.88%
2024	6,640,875	−4.61%

Data in 2015 includes Negros Oriental.
Data in 2020 includes Negros Oriental and Siquijor. Source: Philippine Statistics Authority

According to the 2024 census, it has a population of 6,640,875. Before Negros Oriental and Siquijor separated from the region in 2024, it was 8,081,988.

The population density was 510/km^{2} (1,300/sq mi). The 2015 census showed an average annual population growth rate of 1.76% from 2010 to 2015, slightly higher than the national average of 1.72%.

=== Languages ===
The native languages of Central Visayas are:

- Bantayanon, spoken in Bantayan Island of Cebu.
- Boholano, a Cebuano dialect spoken in Bohol.
- Cebuano, spoken in Cebu and Bohol. It is the regional lingua franca.
- Porohanon, spoken in Camotes Islands of Cebu.

== Economy ==
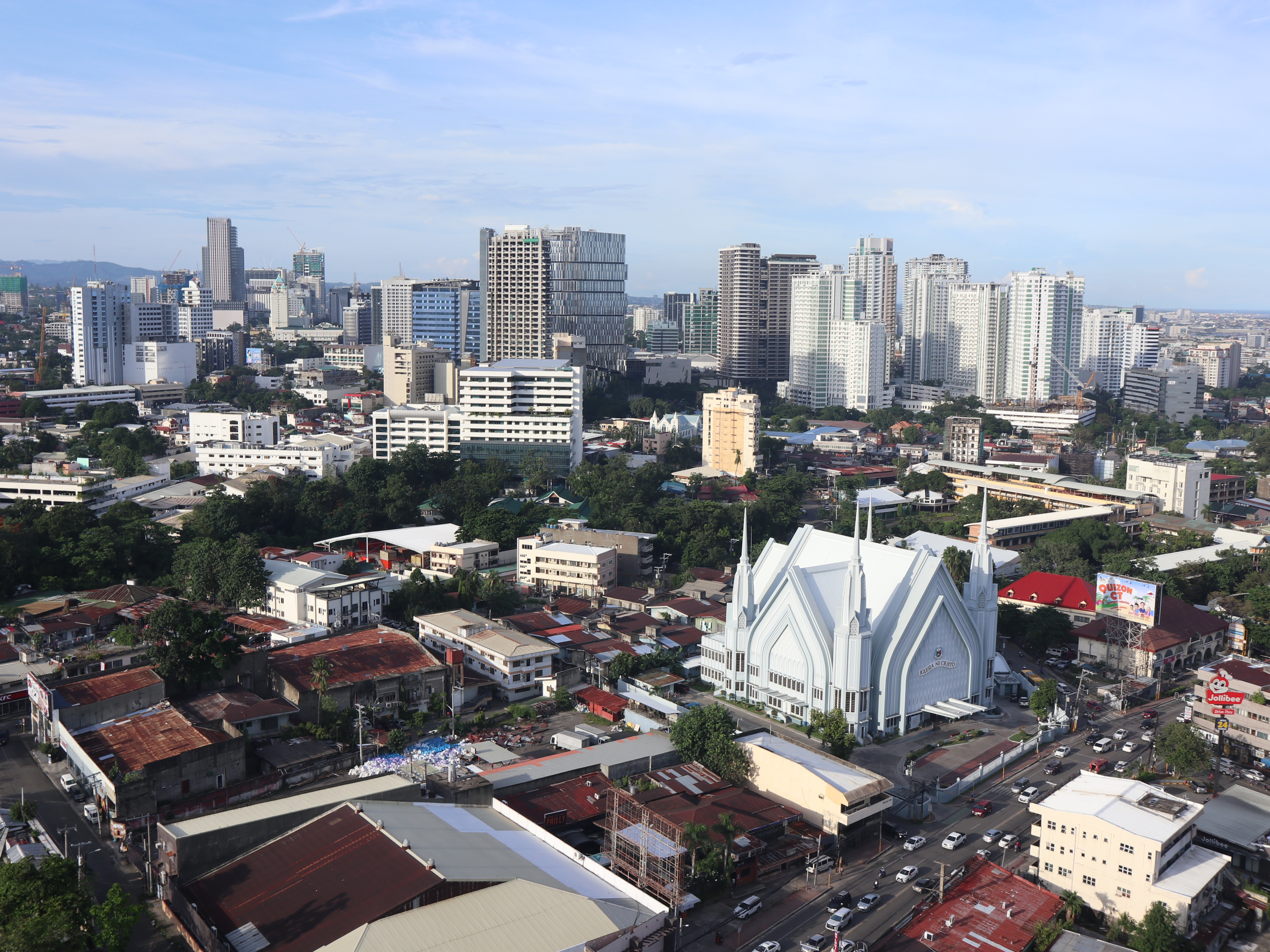
A skyline view of Cebu City.

Poverty incidence of Central Visayas (%)

Source: Philippine Statistics Authority

Central Visayas has the fourth-largest economy in the Philippines. Cebu City serves as the region's economic hub.

== Transportation ==
=== Ports ===
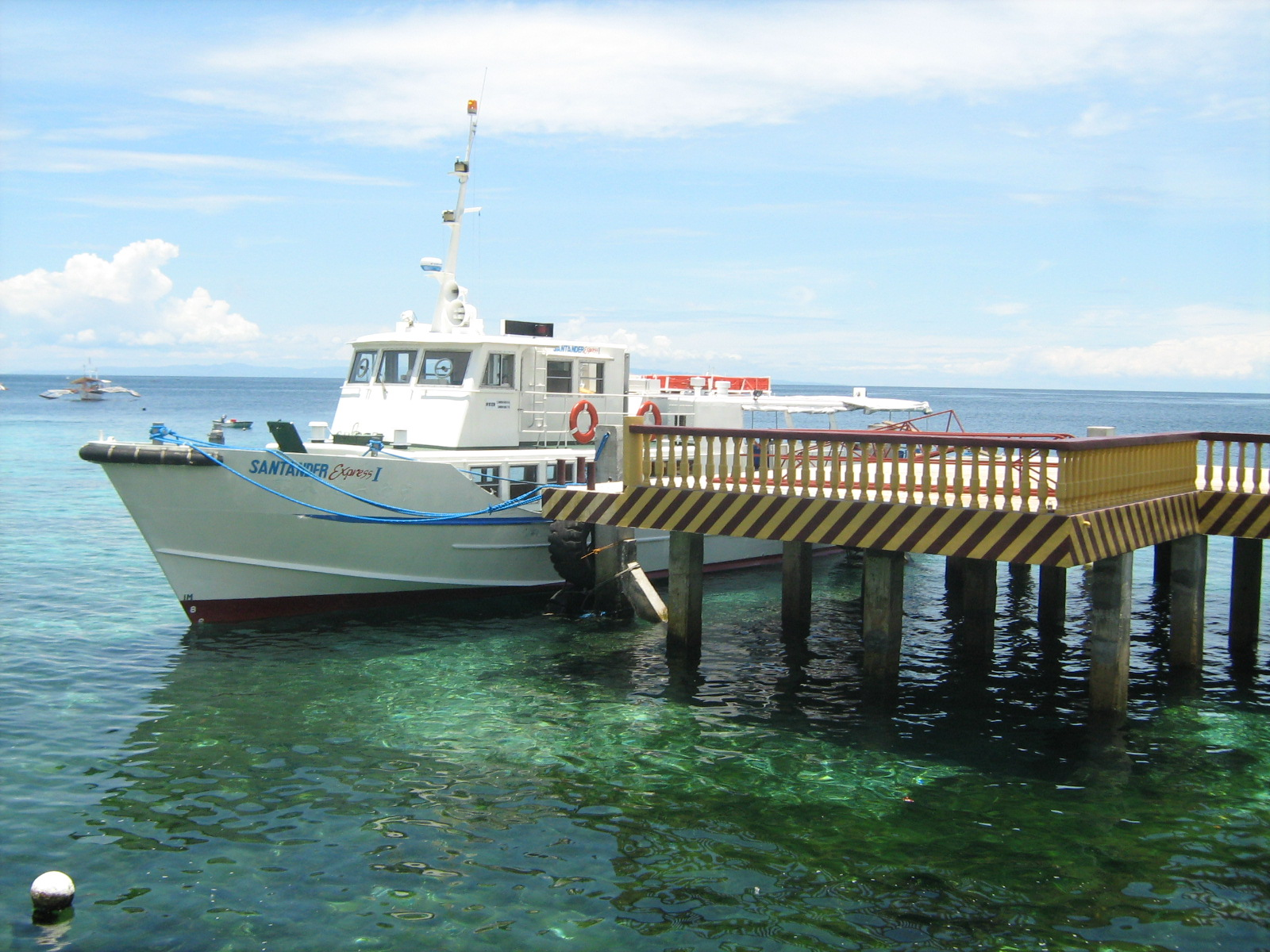
Fastcraft terminal for ferrying passengers from Cebu to Negros Island.

The Port of Cebu is the region's main gateway by sea. Other seaports in the region include the Liloan Port in Santander, Cebu and the Port of Tagbilaran in Bohol. Inter-island shipping is served by numerous shipping lines, including ro-ro companies Montenegro Lines and Lite Ferries and fastcraft companies OceanJet and Supercat.

=== Airports ===
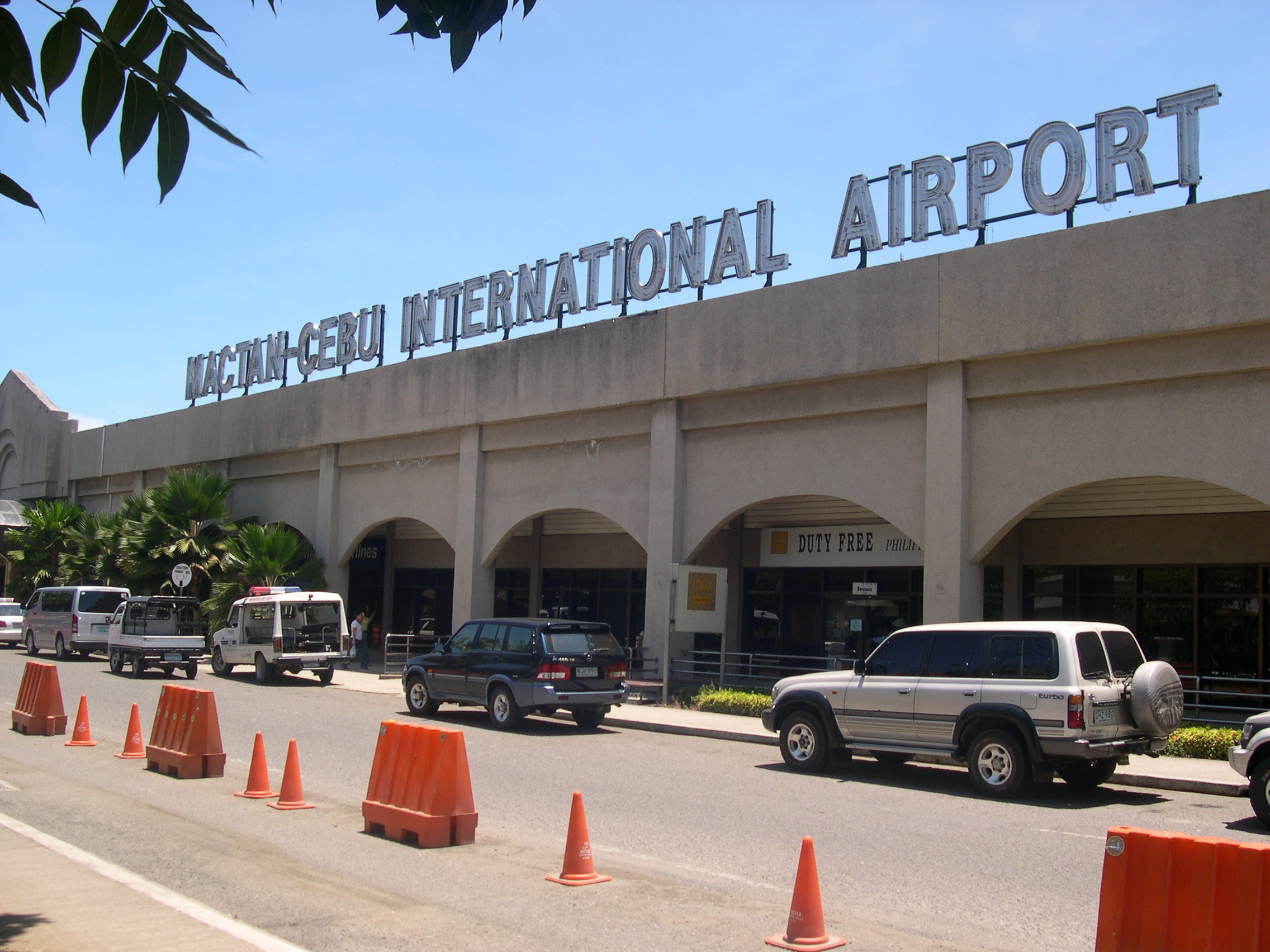
Mactan–Cebu International Airport.

Mactan–Cebu International Airport, located on Mactan Island in Metro Cebu, is the country's second-busiest airport and a gateway to the region by air. It is the secondary hub of Cebu Pacific and Philippine Airlines (and their subsidiaries), with flights to locations throughout the country. It also serves international flights to other Asian and intercontinental destinations.

Bohol–Panglao International Airport serves Bohol and is the region's newest airport.

== Mass media ==
Cebu City is the main media hub for the region. Large media networks – ABS-CBN, GMA Network, TV5, People's Television Network, CNN Philippines, and IBC 13 – maintain their respective local stations and branches for viewership, commercial and news coverage purposes. Most of these stations broadcast local news and public affairs as well as entertainment and dramas to cater to the local viewers.

Aside from the 24 national daily newspapers available, Cebu City also has 20 local newspapers. Among the widely read are SunStar Cebu, Cebu Daily News, and The Freeman.
