= San Juan, Southern Leyte =

Municipality in Southern Leyte, Philippines

San Juan Cabalian
- Municipality
- Municipality of San Juan
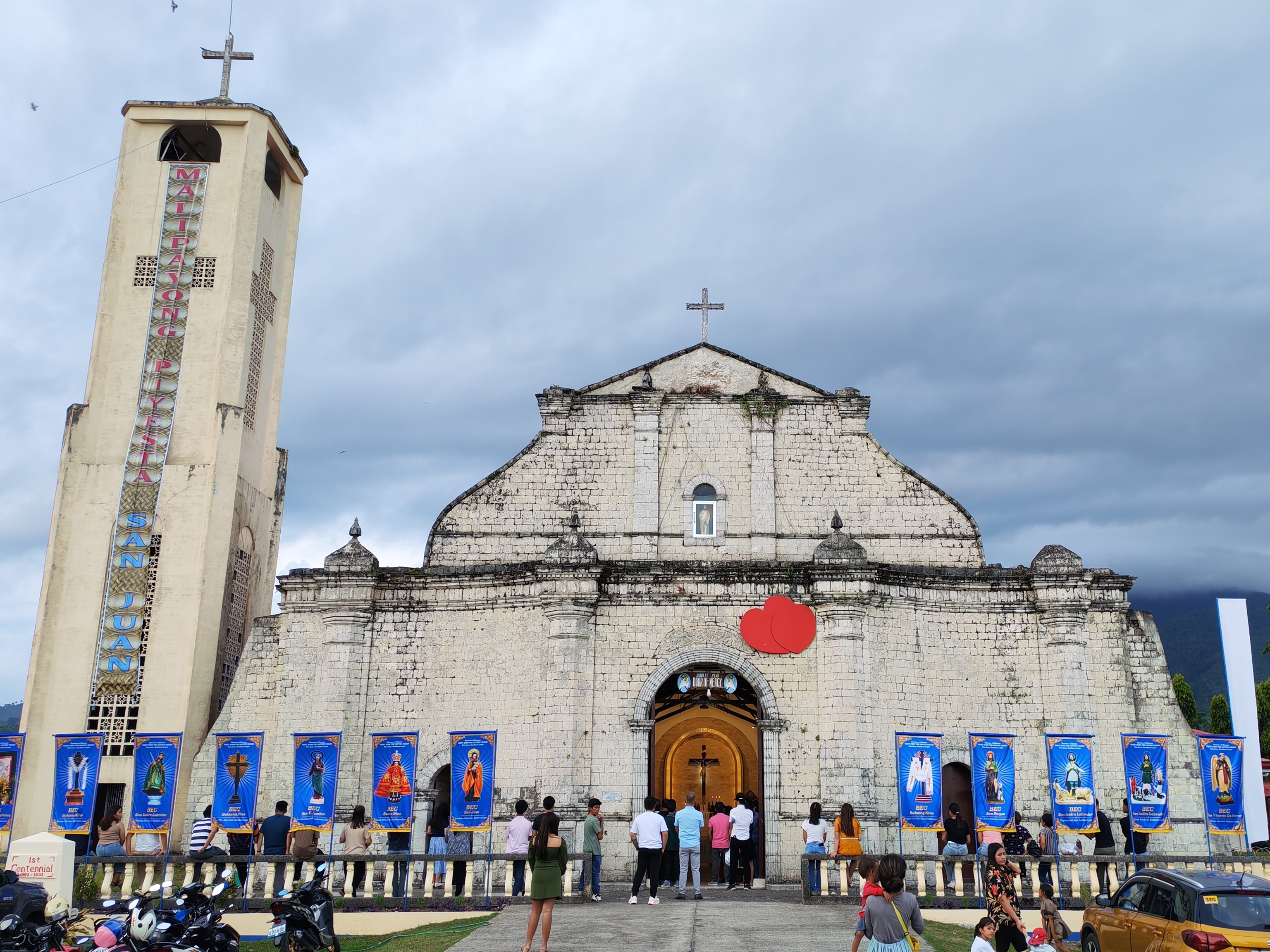
- Saint John the Baptist Parish Church

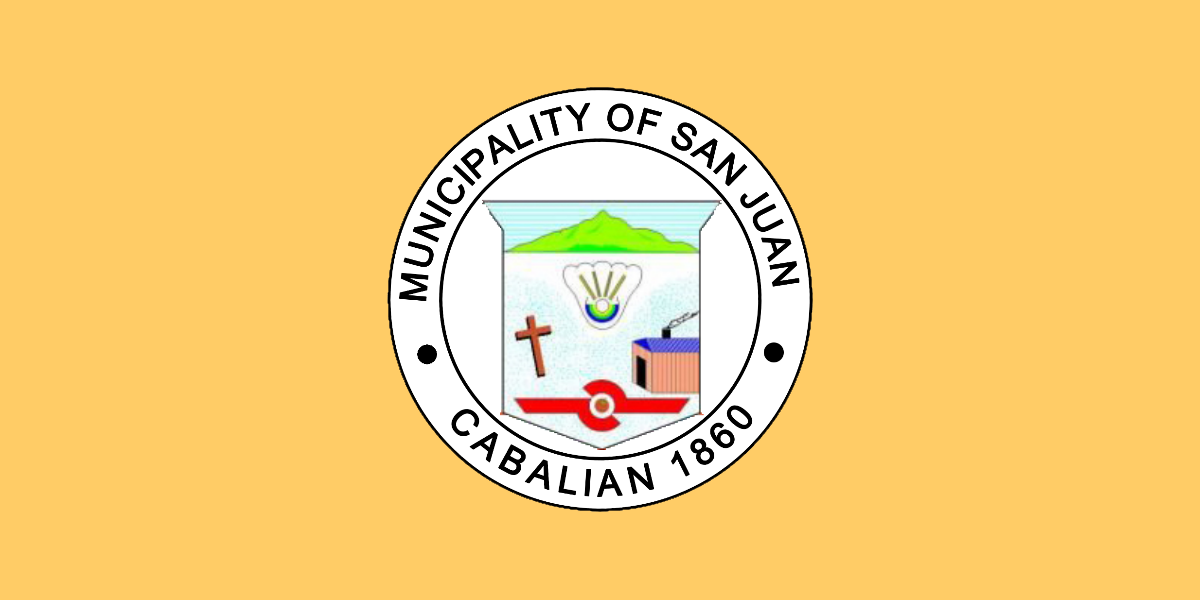
- Flag

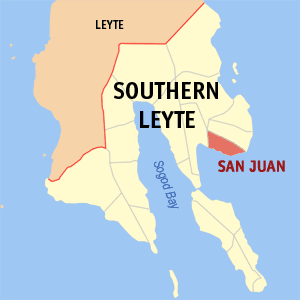
- Map of Southern Leyte with San Juan highlighted
- Interactive map of San Juan
- Location within the Philippines
- Coordinates: 10°16′N 125°11′E
- Country: Philippines
- Region: Eastern Visayas
- Province: Southern Leyte
- District: 2nd district
- Renamed: June 17, 1961
- Named for: John the Baptist
- Barangays: 18 (see Barangays)

Government
  - Type: Sangguniang Bayan
  - Mayor: Reynaldo D. Saludo (PDR)
  - Vice Mayor: Lou Bienvenido G. Laplap (PDR)
  - Representative: Christopherson M. Yap
  - Municipal Council: Members: Catherine C. Renegado; Evencio M. Castillones; Rico B. Calas; Valentin B. Ouano Jr.; Rolando L. Evaldez; Arnold F. Luego; Cherymer C. Yu; Sixto B. Evaldez
  - Electorate: 10,962 voters (2025)

Area
  - Total: 96.12 km^{2} (37.11 sq mi)
- Elevation: 123 m (404 ft)
- Highest elevation: 928 m (3,045 ft)
- Lowest elevation: 0 m (0 ft)

Population (2024 census)
  - Total: 15,036
  - Density: 156.4/km^{2} (405.2/sq mi)
  - Households: 3,548

Economy
  - Income class: 4th municipal income class
  - Poverty incidence: 18.45% (2023)
  - Revenue: ₱ 33.91 million (2024)
  - Assets: ₱ 351.1 million (2024)
  - Expenditure: ₱ 130.5 million (2024)
  - Liabilities: ₱ 32.47 million (2024)

Service provider
  - Electricity: Southern Leyte Electric Cooperative (SOLECO)
- Time zone: UTC+8 (PST)
- ZIP code: 6611
- PSGC: 0806414000
- IDD : area code: +63 (0)53
- Native languages: Kinabalian; Boholano dialect Cebuano; Tagalog

San Juan, officially the Municipality of San Juan (Kabalian: Lungsod san San Juan; Cebuano: Lungsod sa San Juan; Tagalog: Bayan ng San Juan), is a municipality in the province of Southern Leyte, Philippines. According to the 2024 census, it has a population of 15,036 people.

The municipality was formerly known as Cabalian (also spelled as Cabali-an) It is spelled as "Caualian" in the first Murillo-Velarde Map of the Philippines published in 1734.

The Kabalian language, a Visayan language distinct from Waray-Waray and Cebuano, is spoken in some communities in San Juan.

== History ==
There seems to be no consensus on the exact origin of the name Cabali-an. While there are several versions, the most popular one involves Magellan who happened to pass by Cabalian. This account tells of Magellan and his crew attempting to land this settlement after being battered by a heavy storm known locally as “subasco”. One of his ships had a broken main mast that required immediate repair. The curious natives led by their chieftain, Datu Malitik, gathered on the shore as they closely watched the approaching ships. The natives who were armed noticed the broken mast and shouted “gikabali-an”. Roughly translated, the word means “to experience a breakage or broken materials”. Magellan and his men interpreted the hostile-surrounding shouts as the name of the place. Not wishing to engage the natives in combat after the battering of the storm, the explorers lifted anchors and sailed away.

Cabalian used to be the largest Leyte town facing the Pacific Ocean until its 19 barrios were excised to form the new municipality of Saint Bernard, by virtue of Executive Order No. 84 signed on December 9, 1954.

On June 17, 1961, Republic Act No. 3088, which changed the name Cabali-an to San Juan, was signed into law by President Carlos P. Garcia. However, up to this day, the town is still known as Cabali-an. The name simply refuses to disappear on maps, telecommunication directories and in most people's minds.

== Geography ==
=== Barangays ===
San Juan (Cabali-an) is politically subdivided into 18 barangays. Each barangay consists of puroks and some have sitios.

- Agay-ay
- Basak
- Bobon A
- Bobon B
- Dayanog
- Garrido
- Minoyho
- Osao
- Pong-oy
- San Jose (Poblacion)
- San Roque
- San Vicente
- Santa Cruz (Poblacion)
- Santa Filomena
- Santo Niño (Poblacion)
- Somoje
- Sua
- Timba

=== Climate ===
Climate data for San Juan, Southern Leyte
Month	Jan	Feb	Mar	Apr	May	Jun	Jul	Aug	Sep	Oct	Nov	Dec	Year
Mean daily maximum °C (°F)	28 (82)	28 (82)	29 (84)	30 (86)	30 (86)	30 (86)	29 (84)	29 (84)	29 (84)	29 (84)	29 (84)	28 (82)	29 (84)
Mean daily minimum °C (°F)	22 (72)	22 (72)	22 (72)	23 (73)	25 (77)	25 (77)	25 (77)	25 (77)	25 (77)	24 (75)	24 (75)	23 (73)	24 (75)
Average precipitation mm (inches)	78 (3.1)	57 (2.2)	84 (3.3)	79 (3.1)	118 (4.6)	181 (7.1)	178 (7.0)	169 (6.7)	172 (6.8)	180 (7.1)	174 (6.9)	128 (5.0)	1,598 (62.9)
Average rainy days	16.7	13.8	17.3	18.5	23.2	26.5	27.1	26.0	26.4	27.5	24.6	21.0	268.6
Source: Meteoblue

== Demographics ==
Population census of San Juan
Year	Pop.	±% p.a.
1903	6,209	—
1918	11,309	+4.08%
1939	17,608	+2.13%
1948	17,922	+0.20%
1960	9,069	−5.52%
1970	10,616	+1.59%
1975	11,136	+0.96%
1980	11,614	+0.84%
1990	11,703	+0.08%
1995	11,392	−0.50%
2000	13,510	+3.72%
2007	14,442	+0.92%
2010	14,073	−0.94%
2015	14,858	+1.04%
2020	14,912	+0.08%
2024	15,036	+0.20%
Source: Philippine Statistics Authority

== Economy ==
Poverty incidence of San Juan (%)

Source: Philippine Statistics Authority

== Government ==
=== Elected officials ===
Elected officials (2022-2025):

- Municipal Mayor: Reynaldo D. Saludo
- Municipal Vice Mayor: Lou Bienvenido G. Laplap
- Municipal Councilors:
  - Catherine C. Renegado
  - Evencio M. Castillones
  - Rico B. Calas
  - Valentin B. Ouano Jr.
  - Rolando L. Evaldez
  - Arnold F. Luego
  - Cherymer C. Yu
  - Sixto B. Evaldez

== Communication ==
Mobile services are serviced by Smart Communications (since 2002), Globe Telecom (since 2004), and Dito Telecommunity (since 2023).

Cable television include Fiesta Cable Inc., the first cable TV entirely Pacific Area in the province and is based in the municipality.

== Culture ==
=== Festival ===
The town celebrates its rich Catholic heritage every 24th day of June, the Solemnity of the Nativity of St. John the Baptist, Precursor to Jesus Christ. The "novemdiales" or novena in honor of the patron saint commences every 15th day of June, and is referred to as jornadas. Jornadas in Spanish means "sojourns" or "journeys", which specifically refer to the translation of the patron saints of all barangays to kiosks or minuscule chapels outside the baroque parish church. In addition to the eighteen patron saints of the 18 barangays of Cabalian, more come from the hill villages of Hinunangan. They remain in those chapels until the 24th day of June, called the kahuyugan, whence they are processed around the town in andas and carrozas.

The fiesta spans for three (3) days: (1) disperas (Sp. vísperas) which falls on the 23rd day of June, coinciding with the Vespers for the Nativity of St. John the Baptist in the Divine Office; (2) kahuyugan (lit. the day on which the fiesta falls) on the 24th of June, coinciding with the main celebrations; and (3) liwas (lit. post-fiesta) on the 25th day of June, when the remaining victuals are served to fiesta-goers who want to avoid the fiesta traffic and hullabaloo.

The novena is said in the parish church. Preserving the incorruptible tradition of Visayan Catholic identity, the long Gozos in honor of St. John is sung. The tradition of the gozos goes back to the august cathedrals of Spain and Portugal. The structure of the gozos follows the usual format of the Spanish gozos: an estribillo (couplet) repeated after every estrofa (verse).

Although, the Solemnity of the Nativity of St. John the Baptist was traditionally not celebrated with water dousing, sometime in 2000, the LGU launched the Sinabligay Festival, which translates as Water Dousing Festival. The LGU has passed ordinances prohibiting the use of dirty water during this Festival.

Amongst the activities included in the Town and Patronal Fiesta are the following

1. SLSU Alumni Homecoming, organized by the Southern Leyte State University
2. SJNHS Grand Alumni Homecoming, organized by the San Juan National High School
3. Parish Pastoral Night
4. The Search for Ms. TEEN Cabalian, organized by the Municipal Federation of Sangguniang Kabataan, in partnership with KUYOGG Inc. (Kabalian United Youth Organization for Good Governance.
5. The "Sinabligay Festival"
6. The "Wet and Wild Party"

== See also ==
- List of renamed cities and municipalities in the Philippines
