= BVY =

BVY or bvy may refer to:

- BVY, the IATA code for Beverly Regional Airport, Essex County, Massachusetts
- bvy, the ISO 639-3 code for Baybay language, Philippines
