= Kabalian language =

Language spoken in San Juan, Philippines

Kinabalian
- Cabalianon, Kinabalianon, Binisaja nga Kabalianon
- Kinabalian
- Native to: Philippines
- Region: San Juan, Southern Leyte
- Native speakers: 14,000 (2009)
- Language family: Austronesian: Malayo-Polynesian; Philippine; Greater Central Philippine; Central Philippine; Bisayan; Central Bisayan; Warayan; Kinabalian

Language codes
- ISO 639-3: cbw
- Glottolog: kina1252

The Kabalian (Cabalian) language, Kinabalian, is spoken in the municipality of San Juan in the province of Southern Leyte in the Philippines. It is closely related to Waray-Waray.

Native speakers refer to the language as Cabalianon or Kinabalianon. This language shares certain characteristics with Cebuano, Boholano, and Surigaonon mainly because of the seafaring livelihood of pre-Hispanic inhabitants of Cabalian, documented by Spanish explorers. Waray did not make inroads into the southern portion of Leyte because of the mountains separating the north and south portions of the island. This is coherent under the principle of mountains divide; seas unite in the spread of Philippine languages.

The heaviest influence on Cabalianon is Surigaonon, owing to the contact between Cabalian and Surigao in the early Spanish period. Cabalianons, as well as the natives of Sogod, regularly travelled to Surigao and Butuan to obtain gold, a fact recorded by the Augustinian Friar Agustín María de Castro in the Osario venerable.

Kabalian (la) is spoken in six villages in San Juan (Cabalian) town, Southern Leyte Province. These barangays are located in the eastern portion of the town. The predominance of Cabalianon in this side of the town is because migrants from Cebu and Bohol settled in the western portion of the town, particularly Pong-oy, as well as in Himatagon, the business hub of Saint Bernard, formerly a part of Cabalian, resulting in the gradual disappearance of the language in these parts.

Although Kabalian is a Warayan language, it has mixed elements of Boholano, Cebuano and Surigaonon, a similar pattern which is also found in Baybayanon. However, Kabalian is not mutually intelligible with either Waray-Waray, Boholano, Cebuano or Surigaonon. Kabalian speakers do not ethnically or linguistically identify themselves with speakers of either of these languages.

== Vocabulary ==
| English | Tagalog | Cebuano | Southern Leyteño | Waray | Kabalian |
|---|---|---|---|---|---|
| dog | aso | irô | irô | ido, ayam | idò |
| cat | pusà | iríng | iríng | uding | idíng |
| house | bahay | baláy | ba:ay | balay | bayáy |
| fire | apóy | kaláyo | kajo | kalayo | kayajo |
| man | lalaki | laláki | laki | lalaki | layaki |
| woman | babae | babáye | baji | babaye | babaji |
| say | sabi | ingón | ingon | siring | laong |
| this | ito | kirí/kiní | kiri/kari | ini | ini |
| that | iyan | kanâ/kadtó | kara | iton | iton/jaon |
| hungry | gutom | gútom | gutom | gutom | gusla |
| like this/that | ganito/ganyan | ingon ani/ana | ingon ani/ana | hini/hiton | sama sini/sama jaon; sama siton; samahon |
| to borrow | hiram | hulam | huwam | huram | huyam |
| cooked rice | kanin | kan-on | kan-on | kan-on | lutó |

== Interrogatives ==
- Sin-o? Who?
- Kanin-o? To whom?
- Uno? What?
- Giuno? How? (past)
- Unhon/unohon? How? (future)
- Haman? Where? (for person or object)
- Ngain? Where? (for place)
- Diin? Where? (for directions or origin)
- Kanus-a? When?
- Ngaman? Why?
- Amo baja? Really?
- Tagpila? How much?

Haman, ngain, and diin mean 'where'. They have distinct uses in Kabalianon.

Haman is used when asking about a person or object.

- Haman si Papa? (Where is Papa?)
- Haman gibutang an gunting? (Where was the scissor put?)

Ngain is used when asking about a place.

- Ngain man (ki)ta mularga? (Where are we going to?)
- Ngain man kaw pasingud? (Where are you going?)

Diin is used when asking about directions or origin.

- Diin man ini dapita? (Where is this place?)
- Taga Diin man kaw? (Where are you from?)
- Diin man kaw gikan? (Where were you?)

== Phrases and vocabulary ==
- Kumusta! (Hello)
- Maajong buntag (Good morning)
- Maajong udto (Good noon)
- Maajong hapon (Good afternoon)
- Maajong gabii (Good evening or good night)
- Maajong adlaw (Good day)
- Ajoajo (Goodbye)
- Pag-amping (Take care)
- Salamat (Thank you)
- Ajaw (Don't)
- Waya (Nothing)
- Dili (No)
- Oo (Yes)
- Baga(n) (Maybe)
- Bayu (I don't know)

== Comparison between Cabalianon, Surigaonon, Cebuano, and Waray ==
| English | Cebuano | Waray | Surigaonon | Cabalianon |
|---|---|---|---|---|
| What is your name? | Unsa ang imong ngalan? | Ano it imo ngaran? | Omay imo ngayan? | Uno may (=Umay) imo ngayan? Sin-o may (=Simay) imo ngayan? |
| My name is Juan. | Ang ngalan nako (kay) Juan. | An akon ngaran Juan. | An ako ngayan Juan. | An ako ngayan Juan. |
| How are you? | Kumusta ka? | Kumusta ka? | Kumusta kaw? | Kumusta kaw? |
| I am fine, too. | Maayo da/ra usab. | Maupay la gihap. | Marajaw da/ra i-/sab ako. | Maajo da/ra i-/sab/-sad. |
| Where is Pedro? | Hain/asa man (=Haman) si Pedro? | Hain hi Pedro? | Haman si Pedro? | Hai/-n man (=Haman) si Pedro? |
| He is at home. | Tua siya sa balay. | Adto hiya ha balay. | Jadto sija sa bayay. | Adto sija sa bayay. |
| Thank you | Salamat | Salamat | Salamat | Salamat |
| I am staying at _____. / I live at ______. | Nagpuyo ko sa _____. | Naukoy ako ha ______. | Naghuya aku sa _____. | Nagpujo/Naghunong ko sa ______. |
| I am here at the house. | Dia ko sa balay. | Adi ako ha balay. | Jari ako sa bayay. | Ari a-/ko sa bayay. |
| I am hungry. | Gigutom ko. | Nagugutom ak/-o. | Taggutom ako. | Gigutom a-/ko. More commonly: Gigusla ko. |
| He is there, at school. | Tua siya sa iskwelahan. | Adto hiya ha iskwelahan. | Jadto sija sa iskuylahan. | Adto sija sa iskuylahan. |
| Now | Karon | Yana | Kuman | Kuman |
| Later | Unya | Niyan | Ngaj-an | Ngaj-an |
| What day is today? | Unsa nga adlaw karon? | Ano nga adlaw yana? | Oman na adlaw kuman? | Uno man (=Uman) adlawa kuman? |
| What day will you leave? | Unsa nga adlaw ka molarga? | Ano nga adlaw ka malarga? | Unu na adlaw kaw mularga? Or: Kun-o kaw mularga? | Uno man (=Uman) adlawa kaw molarga? |
| My walk last Saturday. | Ang lakaw nako kaniadtong sabado. | An akon lakat hadton sabado. | An ako panaw adton sabado. | An ako panaw sadton sabado. |
| When did they eat? | Kanus-a sila mikaon? | Kakan-o hira kumaon? | Kagan-o sila nangaon | Kanus-a sila nangaon? |
| When did you arrive? | Kanus-a ka miabot? | Kakan-o ka umabot? | Kagan-o man kaw nin-abot? | Kanus-a man kaw noabot |
| When are you going to school? | Kanus-a ka moadto sa iskwelahan? | San-o ka makadto ha iskwelahan? | Kun-o man kaw mukadto sa iskuylahan? | Kanus-a man kaw mokadto sa iskuylahan? |
| Where are you going? | Asa ka paingon/padulong? | Makain ka? | Haman kaw pasingud? Or: Haman kaw mukadto? | Hai/n man (=Haman) kaw pasingod? Or: Ngain kaw singod? |
| Who is that person? | Kinsa na nga tawo? | Hin-o iton hiya? | Siman jaon? Or: Siman jaon sija? | Sin-o man (=Siman) ton tawhana? Or: Sin-o man (=Siman) jaon? |
| Who own this shirt? | Kang kinsa (=Kansa) kini nga sinina? | Kan kanay ini nga bado? | Kanin-o ini baro? | Kanin-o man (=Kaman) ini sininaa? |
| Where is mother? | Asa/Hain si nanay? | Hain hi nanay? | Haman si nanay? | Hai/-n man (=Haman) si nanay? |
| When were you born? | Kanus-a ka gipanganak/natawo? | Kakan-o ka gin-anak/natawo? | Kagan-o man kaw tag-anak/natawo? | Kanus-a man kaw gipanganak/natawo? |
| Why are you crying? | Ngano nga nagahilak ka? | Kay ano nga nagtatangis/nagtutu-ok ka? | Oman nagtuwaw man kaw? | Ngano man (=Ngaman) nagtuwaw man kaw? |
| How do you sleep? | Unsaon man nimo pagkatulog? | Aanhon man nimo pagkaturog? | Unhon man nimo pagkatuyog? | Unhon man nimo pagkatuyog? |
