= Ratagnon language =

Austronesian language spoken in the Philippines

Ratagnon
- Latagnon, Datagnon
- Native to: Philippines
- Region: Southern tip of Mindoro
- Ethnicity: 2,000 (1997)
- Native speakers: 310 (2010)
- Language family: Austronesian: Malayo-Polynesian; Philippine; Central Philippine; Bisayan; Western Bisayan; Kuyan; Ratagnon
- Dialects: Santa Teresa

Language codes
- ISO 639-3: btn
- Glottolog: rata1245
- ELP: Ratagnon

Ratagnon (also translated as Latagnon or Datagnon, and Aradigi) is a regional language spoken by the Ratagnon people, an indigenous group from Occidental Mindoro. It is a part of the Bisayan language family and is closely related to other Philippine languages. Its speakers are shifting to Tagalog. In 2000, there were only two to five speakers of the language. However, in 2010 Ethnologue had reported there were 310 new speakers.

== Classification ==
Ratagnon is closely related to the Cuyonon language, a Bisayan language spoken in the Cuyo Archipelago just to the south of Mindoro.

This may be brought about by migrations of Cuyonons to the southern tip of Mindoro, akin to their migrations to mainland Palawan, a very much gradual process. It could be inferred that these migrations happened at an earlier date before the migrations to mainland Palawan started (around the mid- to late 19th century) due to its diversion from the Cuyonon language (Given that Ratagnon descended from an older language spoken in the general area West of Panay, Ratagnon and Cuyonon are classified under Kuyan), whereas the Cuyonon of mainland Palawan, Calamian and that of Cuyo itself remain the same language with relatively little dialectal difference.

== Distribution ==
According to the Ethnologue, Ratagnon is spoken in the southernmost extreme tip of Mindoro islands, including the municipalities of Magsaysay and Bulalacao.

- Magsaysay, Occidental Mindoro
- Bulalacao, Oriental Mindoro

Barbian (1977a) lists the following locations.

- lower Caguray River near Santa Teresa, Magsaysay, Occidental Mindoro
- San Nicolas, Magsaysay, Occidental Mindoro
- Bamban, Magsaysay, Occidental Mindoro

== Vocabulary ==
Barbian (1977) provides lexical and phonological data for Ratagnon.

Numerals
English	Ratagnon	Cuyonon	Kinaray-a
One	Isara	Isara	Sara
Two	Daruwa	Darwa	Darwa
Three	Tatlo	Tatlo	Tatlo
Four	Apat	Apat	Apat
Five	Lima	Lima	Lima
Six	Anum	Anem	Anem
Seven	Pito	Pito	Pito
Eight	Walo	Walo	Walo
Nine	Siyam	Siyam	Siyam
Ten	Napulo	Sampulo	Pulo

In contrast to Cuyonon, Ratagnon dropped the schwa /ë/ sound, instead opting for a u/o sound. It too borrowed lexical terms from the languages of its Mangyan neighbors and to a lesser extent Spanish It is notable in Barbian's Mangyan – English Vocabulary, 1977 that by that time, Ratagnon might have already experienced heavy Tagalization, present in words such as 'heart', tagiposon in Cuyonon, albeit puso in Ratagnon, same with Tagalog's puso. The word 'why', ayamo in Cuyonon, is noted as bakit and basi in Ratagnon, bakit (bakin + at) being a loan from Tagalog, and basi, a Hanunuo Ambahan term (hayga being non-Ambahan), perhaps inferring that basi is a loan from Ratagnon, as Ambahans have been known to use archaic Hanunuo terms and loans from various languages, one being Ratagnon. This phenomenon is also observed in the Hanunuo traditions of Urukay, perhaps closely related to the Erekay of the Cuyonons, both being a form of Balagtasan. Ratagnon also has terms specific to the lowland river surroundings which are not present in modern Cuyonon, most of which are borrowings from Hanunuo and Buhid, whereas a few are either archaic Cuyonon terms or innovations made within the Ratagnon language. Aside from the aforementioned differences from the Cuyonon language, the two languages are still very much mutually intelligible.

Differences from Cuyonon include:

The usage of the t sound over the d sound, present in:

t and d
English	Ratagnon	Cuyonon
fear	atlok	adlek

Usage of the k sound over the g sound:

k and g
English	Ratagnon	Cuyonon
land	lukta	logta

The aforementioned dropping of the schwa for the u sound present in:

u and ë
English	Ratagnon	Cuyonon
ours (pronoun)	kanamun	kanamen
mine (pronoun)	akun	aken
straight	matadlong	matadleng

The preference for the l over the r sound:

l and r
English	Ratagnon	Cuyonon
pointed	malawis	marawis

There are some words that differ in meaning between Cuyonon and Ratagnon; this is most notable in terms specific to their respective surroundings, which has created false friends with almost the same, yet different, meanings.

False Friends
English	Ratagnon	Cuyonon
to cross from:	tabók (one side of the river to another)	tabók (to cross from a bigger island to a smaller one, ant. of lekas)
cross	tabók (general crossing)	lagted

Influences of Tagalog on Ratagnon
English	Ratagnon	Cuyonon	Tagalog
why	bakit	ayamo	bakit
there	duonon	doto, dogto (archaic)	doon
heart	puso	tagiposon	puso

Comparison Chart
English	Ratagnon	Cuyonon	Hanunuo	Buhid	Tagalog
house	balabag	balay	labag	labagan	bahay
dog	ayam	tio	idu	idu	aso
cold	maramig	maramig	maramig	magnaw, matiís	malamig
plain/flatland	ratag/latag/datag	latagan/datagan	ratag	datag	patag
body hair	bulbol	bolbol	bulbol	ulad	balahibo
left	wala	wala	wala, wal'an	agwala	kaliwa
right	tô	tô			kanan
nothing	ara	ara			wala
straight	matadlong	matadleng	matul'id, malawis	matadlong, malawis	tuwid
ouch	aroy	aroy	adug, adoy	adoy	aray
here	digé	digi/dagi			dito/diné (Southern Tagalog dialects)
this	digé	dia/dagi/daya (archaic)			ito/aré (Southern Tagalog dialects)
get	buul	bel			kuha
put	butang	betang			lagay
sand	baras	baras			buhangin
town	banwa	banwa			bayan
sing	arukay	kanta			kanta/awit
love song	ambalan	balitaw			harana
cradle song	sandaw	sandaw			oyayi/hele
wilderness	talon	talonan/talon			kagubatan
year	dagon	dagon			taon
happen	atabo	n/atabo			nangyari
