= Boholano =

Boholano may refer to:

- Boholano people of the Philippines
- Boholano dialect of Cebuano language
