= Saint Bernard, Southern Leyte =

Municipality in Southern Leyte, Philippines

Saint Bernard Himatagon
- Municipality
- Municipality of Saint Bernard
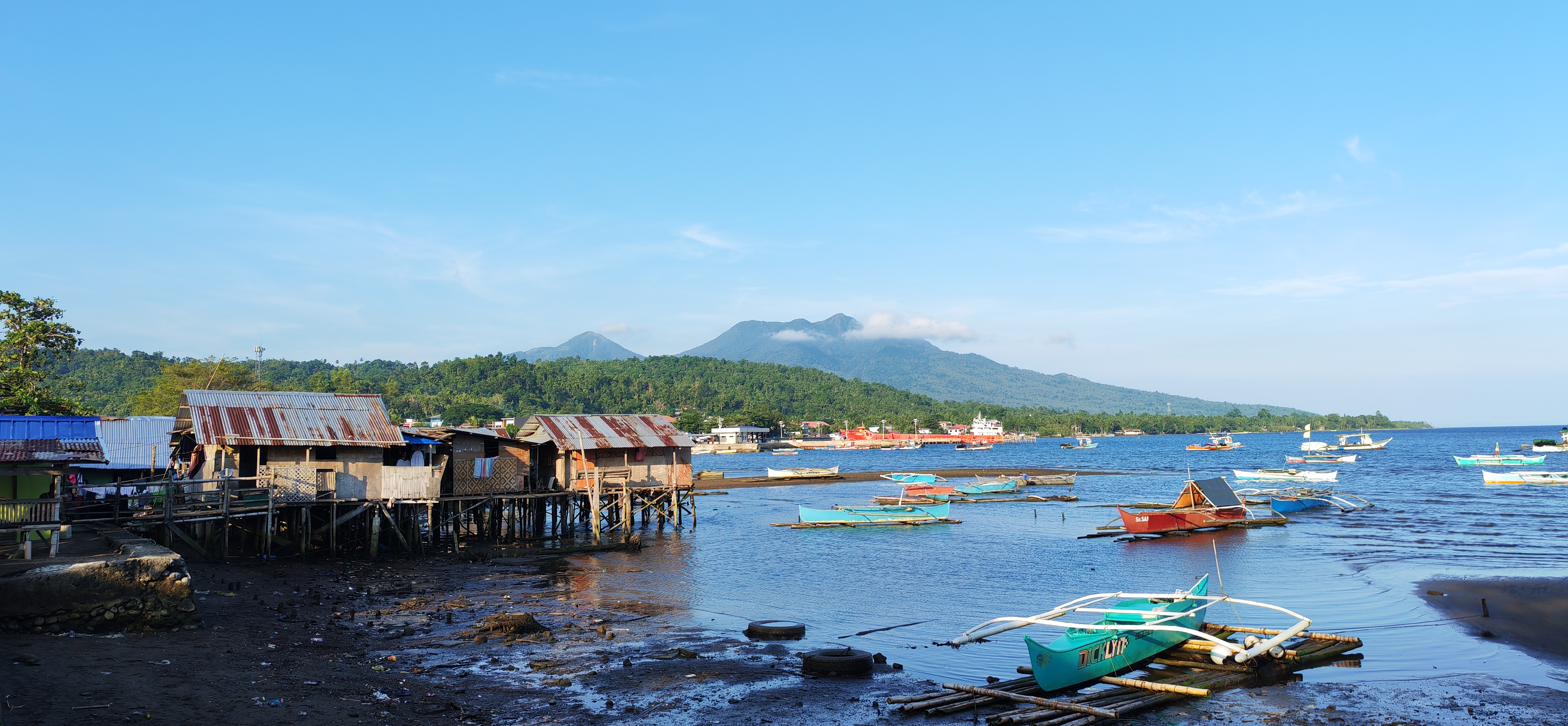
- Saint Bernard coastline

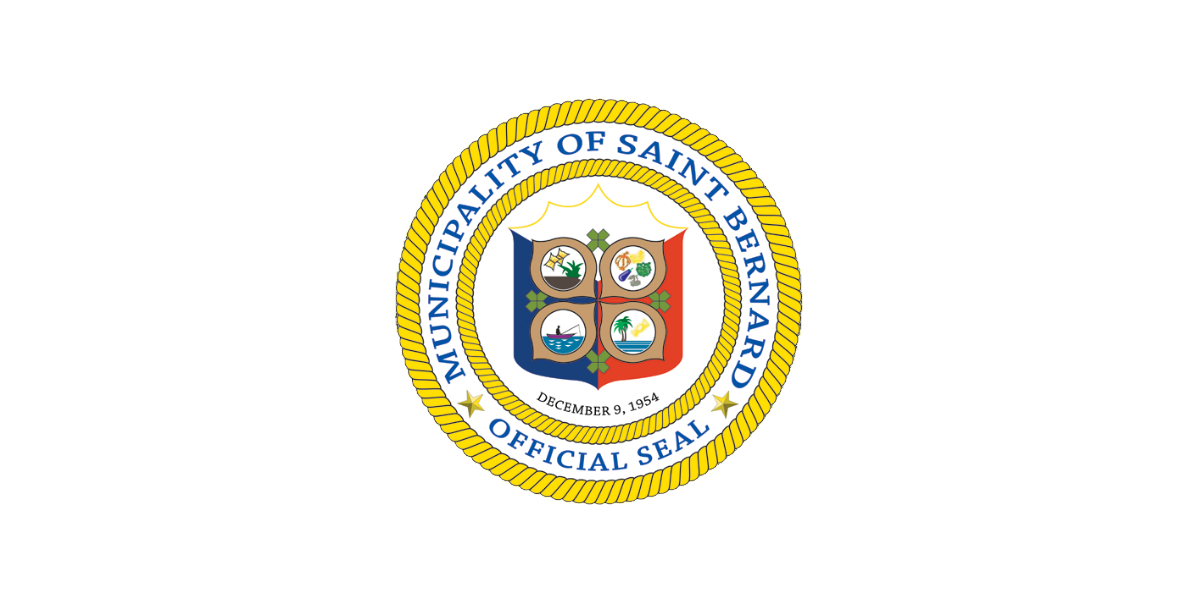
- Flag

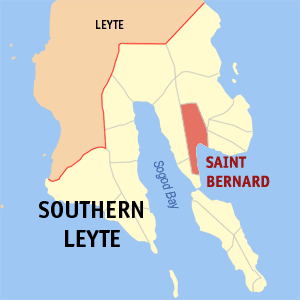
- Map of Southern Leyte with Saint Bernard highlighted
- Interactive map of Saint Bernard
- Location within the Philippines
- Coordinates: 10°17′N 125°08′E
- Country: Philippines
- Region: Eastern Visayas
- Province: Southern Leyte
- District: 2nd district
- Founded: December 9, 1954
- Named for: Bernardo Torres
- Barangays: 30 (see Barangays)

Government
  - Type: Sangguniang Bayan
  - Mayor: Jocelyn L. Bungcaras (PDPLBN)
  - Vice Mayor: Bernadito "Loloy" G.Añora
  - Representative: Christopherson M. Yap
  - Municipal Council: Members: Redan Balasico; Emily Acampado; Gypsi L.So; Eralin Caday; Arnold Cuaton; Jaenas Cuaton; Antonio Dalugdugan; Vacant
  - Electorate: 18,923 voters (2025)

Area
  - Total: 100.20 km^{2} (38.69 sq mi)
- Elevation: 129 m (423 ft)
- Highest elevation: 786 m (2,579 ft)
- Lowest elevation: 0 m (0 ft)

Population (2024 census)
  - Total: 28,131
  - Density: 280.75/km^{2} (727.14/sq mi)
  - Households: 6,254

Economy
  - Income class: 3rd municipal income class
  - Poverty incidence: 23.16% (2023)
  - Revenue: ₱ 163.6 million (2024)
  - Assets: ₱ 520.7 million (2024)
  - Expenditure: ₱ 177.1 million (2024)
  - Liabilities: ₱ 168.7 million (2024)

Service provider
  - Electricity: Southern Leyte Electric Cooperative (SOLECO)
- Time zone: UTC+8 (PST)
- ZIP code: 6616
- PSGC: 0806412000
- IDD : area code: +63 (0)53
- Native languages: Kinabalian; Boholano dialect Cebuano; Tagalog
- Website: www.saintbernard.gov.ph

Saint Bernard, officially the Municipality of Saint Bernard (Kabalian: Lungsod san Saint Bernard; Cebuano: Lungsod sa Saint Bernard; Tagalog: Bayan ng Saint Bernard), is a municipality in the province of Southern Leyte, Philippines. According to the 2024 census, it has a population of 28,131 people.

== Etymology ==
Saint Bernard is named after Bernardo Torres, the former Governor of Leyte who played a significant role in the town's independence from Cabalian (now San Juan), then in the undivided province of Leyte. In gratitude to Torres, the local inhabitants unanimously chose to name the municipality in his honor. The honorific title "Saint" being a translation of the Spanish vernacular honorific "San" (shortened form of santo) which is given to persons of virtue, wisdom, or generosity and the name Bernard being the English version of the name Bernardo.

== History ==
Saint Bernard traces its roots to the largest barrio of Cabalian, then known as "Himatagon".

Governor Bernardo Torres of Leyte, which then encompassed Cabalian, facilitated the conversion of the area into an independent municipality due to the persistent demands of the local inhabitants for separation from Cabalian, later gaining the recommendation of the Leyte Provincial Board. Finally, on December 9, 1954, President Ramon Magsaysay issued Executive Order No. 84, excising Himatagon and 18 other barrios from Cabalian to form the municipality of Saint Bernard. On May 22, 1959, Saint Bernard became part of the newly established province of Southern Leyte, effective July 1, 1960.

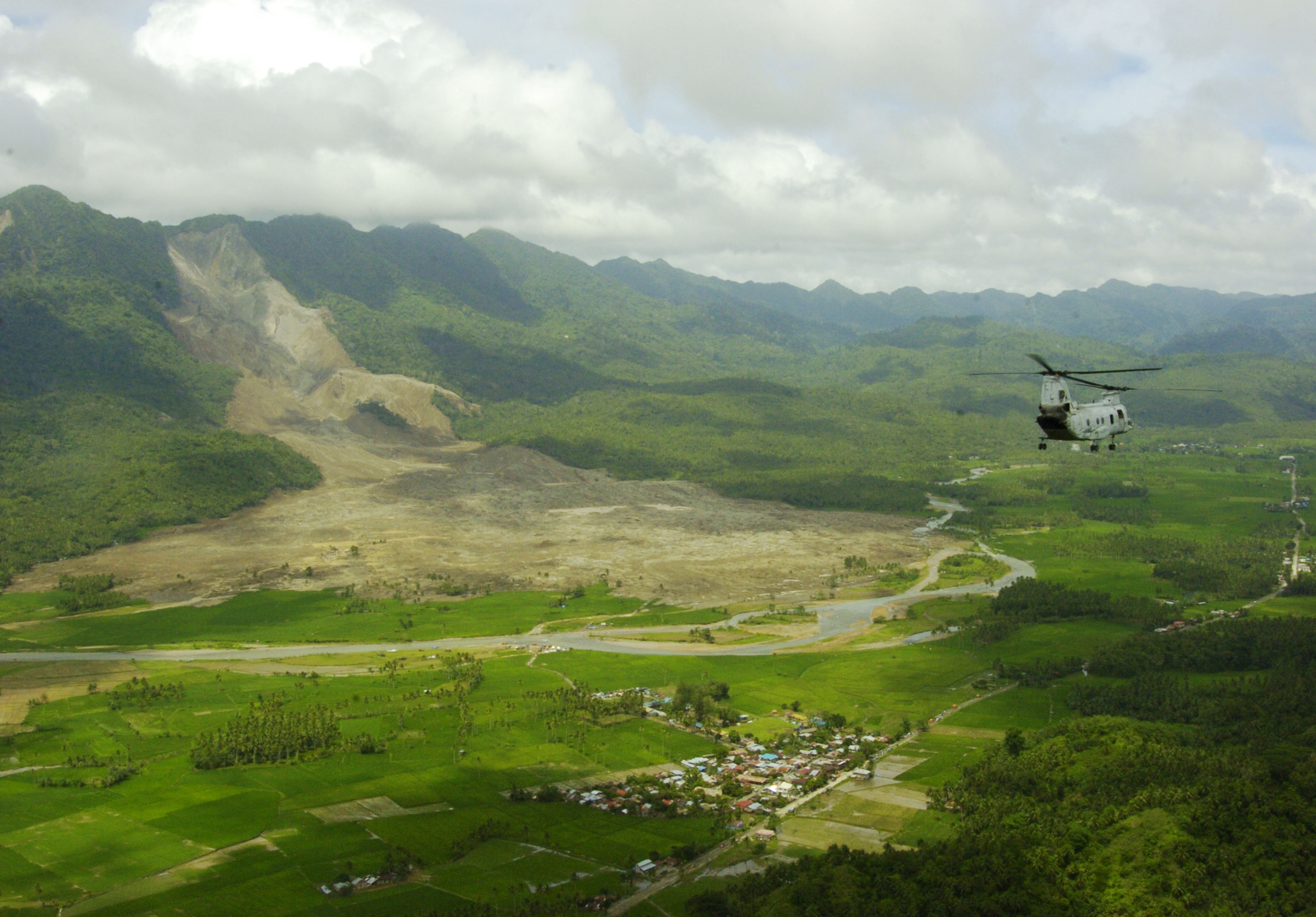
Landslide at Barangay Guinsaugon in 2006

On February 17, 2006, a tragic series of mudslides killed over 1,100 residents in Barangay Guinsaugon, in the northern part of the town. Affected families received aid from the Philippine government and other non-government organizations from around the world. Guinsaugon got buried as the result of the mudslides and thus New Guinsaugon was built close from the original site.

== Geography ==
The town is situated on the Pacific coast, facing Cabalian Bay and the first town on Route 690 (from it towards Abuyog) from the eastern side of Sogod Bay.

=== Barangays ===
Saint Bernard is politically subdivided into 30 barangays. Each barangay consists of puroks and some have sitios.

Only 28 barangays are currently functioning, as Guinsaugon and Sug-angon were completely wiped out from a landslide in 2006. Survivors were relocated to Magbagacay and have their own barangays.

Barangay	Population (2020)
Atuyan	467
Ayahag	417
Bantawon	228
Bolodbolod	1,275
Carnaga	923
Catmon	2,548
Guinsaugon	47
Himatagon (Poblacion)	1,748
Himbangan	2,661
Himos-onan	702
Hinabian	99
Hindag-an	1,605
Kauswagan	28
Libas	411
Lipanto	1,276
Magatas	88
Magbagacay	2,441
Mahayag	662
Mahayahay	1,701
Malibago	1,557
Malinao	42
Maria Asuncion (Cabagawan)	1,264
Nueva Esperanza (Cabac-an)	107
Panian	1,335
San Isidro	1,953
Santa Cruz	313
Sug-angon	382
Tabon-tabon	312
Tambis 1 ^{S}	882
Tambis 2 ^{S}	940

=== Climate ===
Climate data for Saint Bernard, Southern Leyte
Month	Jan	Feb	Mar	Apr	May	Jun	Jul	Aug	Sep	Oct	Nov	Dec	Year
Mean daily maximum °C (°F)	27 (81)	28 (82)	28 (82)	29 (84)	29 (84)	29 (84)	28 (82)	28 (82)	28 (82)	28 (82)	28 (82)	28 (82)	28 (82)
Mean daily minimum °C (°F)	21 (70)	21 (70)	21 (70)	22 (72)	24 (75)	24 (75)	24 (75)	24 (75)	24 (75)	23 (73)	23 (73)	22 (72)	23 (73)
Average precipitation mm (inches)	78 (3.1)	57 (2.2)	84 (3.3)	79 (3.1)	118 (4.6)	181 (7.1)	178 (7.0)	169 (6.7)	172 (6.8)	180 (7.1)	174 (6.9)	128 (5.0)	1,598 (62.9)
Average rainy days	16.7	13.8	17.3	18.5	23.2	26.5	27.1	26.0	26.4	27.5	24.6	21.0	268.6
Source: Meteoblue (modeled/calculated data, not measured locally)

== Demographics ==
Population census of Saint Bernard

Year	Pop.	±% p.a.
1960	11,621	—
1970	17,296	+4.05%
1975	19,255	+2.18%
1980	19,153	−0.11%
1990	20,760	+0.81%
1995	21,363	+0.54%

Year	Pop.	±% p.a.
2000	23,089	+1.68%
2007	25,252	+1.24%
2010	25,169	−0.12%
2015	28,395	+2.32%
2020	28,414	+0.01%
2024	28,131	−0.24%

Source: Philippine Statistics Authority

== Economy ==
Poverty incidence of Saint Bernard (%)

Source: Philippine Statistics Authority

Saint Bernard's economy are based in agriculture and marine culture. The majority of the people who live in the flat lands engage in fishing as their main mode of livelihood. Those who live in the mountain barangays, live through farming.

The municipality is considered among the fastest growing economy in the pacific area of Southern Leyte.

The common mode of transportation is by bicycles with side cars, known locally as "Potpot" (a type of pedicab), or tricycles with side cars, called "trisikads "or center cabs and "habal-habal", a motorcycle with a rudimentary roof.

The Port of Saint Bernard reopened on March 15, 2025. The only shipping company that operates in the Port of Saint Bernard is GT Express Shipping Corp. with its GT1/Star Asia vessels a new route between Saint Bernard and Lipata, Surigao operates on a daily schedule.

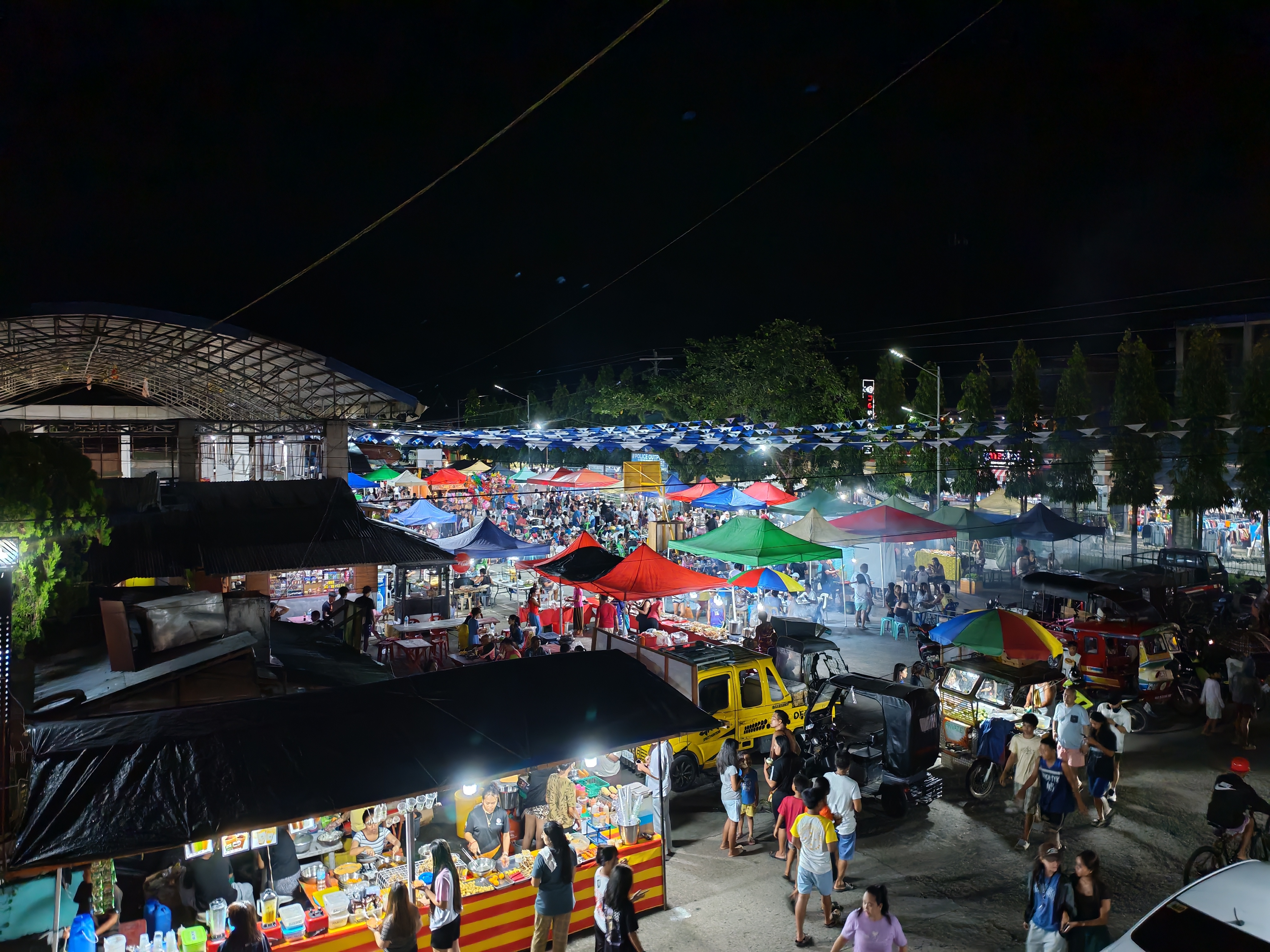
A night market in Saint Bernard

The LGU established the Saint Bernard Town Center for economic activities of small to medium entrepreneurs (SMSE).

== Tourism ==
=== Accommodation Facilities ===
- Kissbone Cove Resort - Brgy, Magbagacay
- Marabel Hotel - Brgy. Magbagacay
- Demar Travelers Lodge - Brgy. Magbagacay
- Zhykiah Lodge - Brgy Himatagon
- Jessa's Lodging House - Brgy Himatagon
- Emzelindy - Brgy Magbagacay (Cabin rooms and Family Room)
- Eso Polo - Brgy Magbagacay
- Forest Spring Resort - Brgy Himos-onan (Cabin and Family Rooms)

=== Places of Interest ===
- Hindag-an Falls- Barangay Hindag-an
- Lipanto Marine Sanctuary- Barangay Lipanto
- Sangat Cave and Beach- Barangay Hindag-an
- Saub Beach- Barangay Lipanto
- Ground Zero Memorial Park & Lawigan River- Lawigan River, access at Brgy Tambis I
- Atabay - Brgy. Himos-onan
- Forest Spring Resort - Brgy. Himos-onan
- Emzelindy Pool Park & Resort - Brgy. Magbagacay
- Eso Polo - Brgy. Magbagacay
- Tubod Mountain Resort - Brgy Panian
- Municipal Disaster Management Office - LGU Compound, Municipal Building, Barangay Himatagon
- Tinago Spring Falls - Brgy Ayahag

== Education ==
There are accessible elementary schools in every barangay in the municipality as of its 2019 census.

=== Secondary Schools ===
- Tambis National High School - located in Brgy. Tambis 1.
- Himbangan National High School - located in Brgy. Himbangan.
- Cristo Rey Regional High School - a private owned by the Diocese of Maasin, in Brgy. Malibago.
- New Guinsaugon National High School - relocation area of New Guinsaugon, Brgy. Guinsaugon.
- Catmon Integrated School - A school with a unified primary and secondary education administration and curriculum, located in Brgy. Catmon.

== Notes ==
S. Tambis 1 and Tambis 2 are pronounced or spelled "Tambis Uno" and "Tambis Dos" respectively, in the Spanish words for one and two. Additionally, they may be spelled in Roman Numerals.
