= Butuanon language =

Austronesian language spoken by Butuanon people in northeastern Mindanao

Butuanon
- Native to: Philippines
- Ethnicity: Butuanons
- Native speakers: 72,000 (2005)
- Language family: Austronesian: Malayo-Polynesian; Philippine; Greater Central Philippine; Central Philippine; Bisayan; Southern Bisayan; Butuan–Tausug; Butuanon

Language codes
- ISO 639-3: btw
- Glottolog: butu1244

Butuanon (Binutwanon, [binutwɐnʊn]) is an Austronesian language spoken by the Butuanon people in Agusan del Norte and Agusan del Sur, with some native speakers in Misamis Oriental and Surigao del Norte. It is a part of the Bisayan language family and is closely related to other Philippine languages. As of 2007, Butuanon is believed to be spoken by fewer than 500 younger speakers in Butuan itself.

Butuanon is very closely related to the Tausug language of distant Sulu and the Surigaonon language of neighboring provinces Surigao del Sur and Surigao del Norte, making these all three languages being the Visayan languages geographically native to Mindanao.

== Phonology ==
=== Vowels ===
Butuanon has three vowels: /a/, /i/, and /u/, with phonemic length.

	Front	Central	Back
Close	i iː		u uː
Open		a aː	

=== Consonants ===
	Bilabial		Dental		Palatal	Velar		Glottal
Nasal		m		n			ŋ	
Stop	p	b	t	d		k	ɡ	ʔ
Fricative			s					h
Approximant (Lateral)					j		w	
Approximant (Lateral)				l				
Rhotic				ɾ				

== Grammar ==
=== Morphosyntactic alignment ===
Butuanon has four triggers:

1. agent
2. patient
3. circumstantial
4. instrument

Case markers in Butuanon
		direct	indirect	oblique
general		ang	hong	sa (Note: Sa may be dropped, replaced with hong, or replaced with a locative demonstrative.)
personal	singular	si	ni	kang
personal	plural	sinda	ninda	kanda

=== Pronouns ===
Pronouns in Butuanon
			direct	indirect		oblique
			direct	postposed	preposed	oblique
1st	singular		ako	ko (Note: Replaced with ta if the object is in the second person.)	ako	kanako
1st	plural	exclusive	kami	namo	amo	kanamo
1st	plural	inclusive	kita	ta	ato	kanato
2nd	singular		ikaw	mo	imo	kanimo
2nd	plural		kamo	niyo	iyo	kaniyo
3rd	singular		siya	niya	iya	kaniya
3rd	plural		sila	nila	ila	kanila
