= Porohanon language =

Bisayan language

Porohanon
- Native to: Philippines
- Region: Central Visayas (Camotes Islands, Cebu)
- Native speakers: (23,000 cited 1960)
- Language family: Austronesian: Malayo-Polynesian; Philippine; Central Philippine; Bisayan; Central Bisayan; Peripheral; Porohanon

Language codes
- ISO 639-3: prh
- Glottolog: poro1253

Porohanon is a regional Bisayan language spoken in the Camotes Islands in the province of Cebu in the Philippines. Its closest relatives are Hiligaynon, Capiznon and Masbateño; it is barely intelligible with Cebuano though it shares 87% of its vocabulary with it and even less intelligible with Waray. It also retains many older features that Cebuano has lost, such as the use of the genitive marker ahead of the second member of a compounded form, the distinction between a definite and indefinite subject marker, and the distinction between a definite genitive marker and a locative one.

== Phonology ==
Consonants of Porohanon
	Bilabial	Alveolar	Palatal	Velar	Glottal
Plosive	p b	t d		k ɡ	ʔ
Nasal	m	n		ŋ	
Fricative		s z			h
Trill		r			
Approximant	w	l	j		

Porohanon has three vowels: /i/, /a/ and /u/. They are contrasted by length.
