= Caluyanon language =

Bisayan language spoken in the Philippines

Caluyanon
- Native to: Philippines
- Region: Caluya, Antique
- Native speakers: (30,000 cited 1994)
- Language family: Austronesian: Malayo-Polynesian; Philippine; Central Philippine; Bisayan; Western Bisayan; Caluyanon

Language codes
- ISO 639-3: clu
- Glottolog: calu1238

Caluyanon is a regional Western Bisayan language spoken in the Semirara Island Group, Caluya, Antique in the Philippines. Most of its speakers use either Kinaray-a or Hiligaynon as their second language.
