= R. David Zorc =

American linguist (born 1943)

- Born: Reynold Duane Zorc (changed legally in 1963); 1943 (age 82–83); United States
- Occupation: Linguist
- Spouse: Nellie Reyes Prado Zorc
- Children: David Nicolas Prado Zorc
- Parent(s): Joseph John Zorc, Anne Gertrude Slana Zorc

Academic background
- Education: Cornell University
- Thesis: The Bisayan dialects of the Philippines: Subgrouping and reconstruction (1975)
- Doctoral advisor: Charles F. Hockett
- Other advisor: John U. Wolff

Academic work
- Discipline: Linguist
- Institutions: Language Research Center & Dunwoody Press, Hyattsvile, MD
- Main interests: Austronesian linguistics, historical linguistics
- Website: zorc.net

R. David Zorc (also R. David Paul Zorc; born 1943) is an American linguist primarily known for his work on Austronesian languages and linguistics, particularly the Philippine languages.

== Education ==
Zorc graduated cum laude with an A.B. in Philosophy from Georgetown University in 1965. From 1965 to 1969, he was a Peace Corps member in the Philippines. In 1971, he obtained an M.A. in Linguistics & Anthropology from Cornell University, and graduated with a Ph.D. in Linguistics in 1975. His doctoral dissertation was a comprehensive survey of the Bisayan languages.

== Career ==
From 1976 to 1986, Zorc was a Senior Lecturer at the School of Australian Linguistics (SAL).

Zorc has contributed to major works on Austronesian historical linguistics such as the Comparative Austronesian Dictionary (1995), to which he contributed an index of Proto-Austronesian reconstructions. He has also published various dictionaries such as the Tagalog slang dictionary (1991).

Other than Austronesian languages, Zorc has also published works on Armenian, Nguni languages, and Cushitic languages.

== Personal life ==
Zorc currently lives in Wheaton, Maryland.

== Selected publications ==
The following are some of Zorc's works.

- Austin, P., McConvell, P., Day, R., Black, P., Zorc, R., Schebeck, B., McKay, G., Hale, K., Laughren, M., Nash, D., Wierzbicka, A., Laughren, M. and Koch, H. editors. Papers in Australian Linguistics No. 15: Australian Aboriginal lexicography. A-66, xii + 185 pages. Pacific Linguistics, The Australian National University, 1983. doi:10.15144/PL-A66
- Zorc, R. David. "A Yolngu-Matha Dictionary - Plans and Proposals". In Austin, P., McConvell, P., Day, R., Black, P., Zorc, R., Schebeck, B., McKay, G., Hale, K., Laughren, M., Nash, D., Wierzbicka, A., Laughren, M. and Koch, H. editors, Papers in Australian Linguistics No. 15: Australian Aboriginal lexicography. A-66:31-40. Pacific Linguistics, The Australian National University, 1983. doi:10.15144/PL-A66.31
- Zorc, R. David. The Bisayan dialects of the Philippines: Subgrouping and reconstruction. C-44, xxiv + 351 pages. Pacific Linguistics, The Australian National University, 1977. doi:10.15144/PL-C44
- Zorc, R. David. "On the Development of Contrastive Word Accent: Pangasinan, a Case in Point". In Nguyễn Đ.L. editor, Southeast Asian linguistic studies, Vol. 3. C-45:241-258. Pacific Linguistics, The Australian National University, 1979. doi:10.15144/PL-C45.241
- Zorc, R. David. "Proto-Philippine Word Accent: Innovation or Proto-Hesperonesian Retention?". In Wurm, S.A. and Carrington, L. editors, Second International Conference on Austronesian Linguistics: Proceedings. C-61:67-119. Pacific Linguistics, The Australian National University, 1978. doi:10.15144/PL-C61.67
- Zorc, R. David. "Where, O where, have the laryngeals gone? Austronesian laryngeals re-examined". In Halim, A., Carrington, L. and Wurm, S.A. editors, Papers from the Third International Conference on Austronesian Linguistics, Vol. 2: Tracking the travellers. C-75:111-144. Pacific Linguistics, The Australian National University, 1982. doi:10.15144/PL-C75.111
- Zorc, R. David. "Some historical linguistic contributions to sociolinguistics". In Geraghty, P., Carrington, L. and Wurm, S.A. editors, FOCAL I: Papers from the Fourth International Conference on Austronesian Linguistics. C-93:341-355. Pacific Linguistics, The Australian National University, 1986. doi:10.15144/PL-C93.341
- Zorc, R. David. "The genetic relationships of Philippine languages". In Geraghty, P., Carrington, L. and Wurm, S.A. editors, FOCAL II: Papers from the Fourth International Conference on Austronesian Linguistics. C-94:147-173. Pacific Linguistics, The Australian National University, 1986. doi:10.15144/PL-C94.147
- Zorc, R. David. "Austronesian apicals (*dDzZ) and the Philippine non-evidence". In Laycock, D.C. and Winter, W. editors, A World of language: Papers presented to Professor S.A. Wurm on his 65th birthday. C-100:751-761. Pacific Linguistics, The Australian National University, 1987.
- Zorc, R. David. "Austronesian culture history through reconstructed vocabulary (an overview)". In Pawley, A.K. and Ross, M.D. editors, Austronesian Terminologies: Continuity and change. C-127:541-594. Pacific Linguistics, The Australian National University, 1994. doi:10.15144/PL-C127.541
