= Baybay language =

Bisayan language spoken in the Philippines

Baybay
- Utudnon
- Baybayanon
- Native to: Philippines
- Region: Baybay, Leyte
- Native speakers: 10,000 (2009)
- Language family: Austronesian: Malayo-Polynesian; Philippine; Central Philippine; Bisayan; Central Bisayan; Warayan; Baybay

Language codes
- ISO 639-3: bvy
- Glottolog: bayb1234
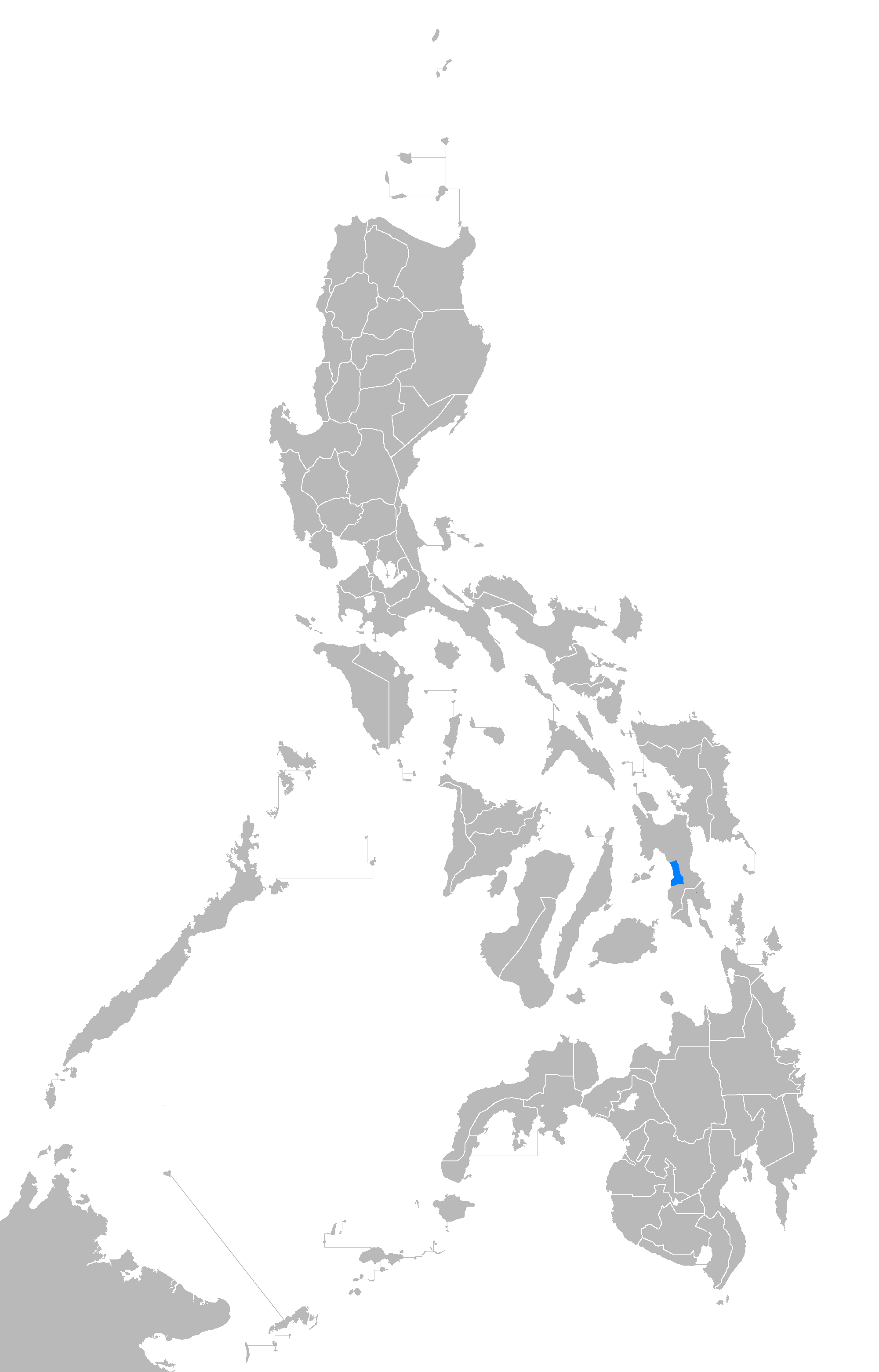
- Areas where the Baybay language is spoken.

The Baybay language, also known as Baybayanon, Utudnon, Waya-Waya or Leyte, is a distinct regional language that was spoken on the island of Leyte in the Philippines before the arrival of Waray and then later, Boholano and Cebuano. It is still spoken around the city of Baybay. It is part of the Bisayan language family and is closely related to other Philippine languages.

== Classification ==
Baybayanon was originally a Warayan language that has been relexified and overlaid by a Cebuano (Leyteño) superstratum. The Warayan substratum is characterized by Baybayanon's more Waray-like deictics, and various other features.

== Geographic distribution ==
Utudnon is spoken by about 10,000 people in five barangays of Baybay municipality, central Leyte, namely Utúd (also called Utod or Guadalupe), Gábas, Kilím, Pátag, Pangasúgan, Gákat (also called Gacat), and Hibunawan.
