= Cuyonon language =

Austronesian language spoken in the Philippines

Cuyonon
- Native to: Philippines
- Region: Palawan coast, Cuyo Islands between Palawan and Panay
- Native speakers: 190,000 (2010)
- Language family: Austronesian: Malayo-Polynesian; Philippine; Central Philippine; Bisayan; Western Bisayan; Kuyan; Cuyonon

Language codes
- ISO 639-3: cyo
- Glottolog: cuyo1237

Cuyonon is a regional Bisayan language spoken on the coast of Palawan and the Cuyo Islands in the Philippines. Cuyonon had been the lingua franca (language used for communication) of the province of Palawan until recently when migration flow into the region rapidly increased. Forty-three percent of the total population of Palawan during the late 1980s spoke and used Cuyonon as a language. Later studies showed a significant decrease in the number of speakers due to an increase of Tagalog-speaking immigrants from Luzon.

The Cuyonon language is classified by the Summer Institute of Linguistics as belonging to the Central Philippine, Western Bisayan, Kuyan subgroup. The largest number of speakers lives in the Cuyo Group of Islands, which is located between northern Palawan and Panay Island.

== Phonology ==
=== Consonants ===
	Labial		Alveolar		Palatal	Velar		Glottal
Plosive	p	b	t	d		k	ɡ	ʔ
Fricative			s					h
Nasal	m		n			ŋ		
Tap/Flap			ɾ					
Approximant	w		l		j			

=== Vowels ===
	Front	Central	Back
Close	i		
Mid		ɘ	o
Open		a	

Unlike most Philippine languages, Cuyonon only includes one close vowel. The close vowel [e] only occurs in loanwords from Spanish, either directly or through Tagalog.

== Simple greetings ==
- Good afternoon – Mayad nga apon
- Good evening/night – Mayad nga gabi
- How are you? – Komosta kaw?
- I'm fine/good and you? – Mayad da, ay ikaw?
- By the grace of God, I'm well.– Kaloy' Dios, mayad da.
- Thank you – Salamat
- Where are you going? – Adin kaw mapakon?
- What are you doing? – Agaiwan kaw? / Anono imong ingboboat?
- Oh, nothing in particular. – Ara ra.
- Please come in. – Dayon kamo.
- Long time no see. – Maboay kita ren nga ara ibagatan.

== Common expressions ==
Cuyonon	Kinaray-a	Tagalog	English
Mayad nga timprano	Mayad nga aga	Magandáng umaga	Good morning
Mayad nga ogtong adlaw	Mayad nga adlawon	Magandáng tanghalì	Good noon
Mayad nga apon	Mayad nga hapon	Magandáng hapon	Good afternoon
Mayad nga sirem	Mayad nga sirëm	Magandáng takipsilim	Good dusk
Mayad nga gabi	Mayad nga gabi-i	Magandáng gabí	Good evening
Mayad nga adlaw	Mayad nga adlaw	Magandáng araw	Good day
Aroman	Sarëm-an	Bukas	Tomorrow
Dominggo	Domingo	Linggo	Sunday
Bolan	Bulan	Buwán	Month
Dagon	Tuig	Taón	Year
Matamang salamat	(Dërë/Rakë) nga salamat	Maraming salamat	Thanks a lot
Inggegegman ta kaw	Ginahigugma ta ikaw	Mahal kitá	I love you
Ingerepan ako kanimo	Ga-ëgët takën kanimo	Naiinís akó sa iyo	I hate you
Een	Hëëd	Oo	Yes
Beken/Indi	Indî/bëkën	Hindî	No
Amos	Dali rën	Tara na	Let's go
Maderep	Mapisan	Masipag	Industrious
Maambeng	Masadya	Masayá	Happy
Masabor	Manamit	Masaráp	Delicious
Mabaskeg	Mabaskëg	Malakás	Strong
Ambog / Boriten	Hambog	Mayabang	Boastful
Kabos	Mango	Mangmang	Dumb
Engey	Buang/buangit	Baliw	Crazy
Bengel	Bëngël	Bingí	Deaf
Maiseg	Maisëg	Matapang	Brave
Maloyo	Mahinay	Mabagal	Slow
Tekagan	Biga-ën/Bigatlën	Malandî	Flirtatious
Diablo	Yawa/Kadë	Masama	Demon
Boring	Higkë/Buring	Dumi	Dirt
Makori	Mabëdlay/Malisëd	Mahirap	Difficult
Adlek	Hadlëk	Takót	Afraid
Lalaki	Laki	Lalaki	Male
Babai'	Bahi/Bayi	Babae	Female
Manong	Manong	Kuya	Older brother
Manang	Manang	Ate	Older sister
Matinlo kaw	Gwapa 'kaw	Maganda ka	You are beautiful
Goapo kaw	Gwapo 'kaw	Pogi ka	You are manly
Maleban kaw	Ma-alwan 'kaw	Mabait ka	You are kind
Amblig	Halong/Mag-amlig	Mag-ingat ka	Take care
Karawat	Sipal	Laro	Play
Tio	Ayam	Aso	Dog
Koti'	Kuti	Pusa	Cat
Ambe	Balabaw	Daga	Rat
Palamingko'	Lasga/Gëyëm	Langgam	Ant
Kalag	Kalag	Kaluluwa	Spirit
Aso'	Aso	Usok/Aso	Smoke
Tobig	Tubig	Tubig	Water
O'bong	Babaw	Itaas	Up
Idalem	Dalëm	Ilalim	Down
Koarta	Kwarta	Salapí	Money
Sinsilio	Sinsilyo	Barya	Coins
Palingki	Mercado/Tienda	Palengke/Pamilihan	Market

== Parts of the body ==
Cuyonon	Kinaray-a	Tagalog	English
Olo	Ulo	Ulo	Head
Mata	Mata	Mata	Eye
Bok	Buhok	Buhok	Hair
Irong	Irong	Ilong	Nose
Talingâ	Talinga	Tainga/Tenga	Ear
Bibig	Bibig	Labi	Lip
Baba	Baba	Bibig	Mouth
Ipen	Unto	Ngipin	Tooth
Pisngi	Yahën	Pisngi	Cheek
Daí	Dahi	Noo	Forehead
