= Bisayan languages =

Language family of the Philippines

Bisayan
- Bisayâ; Binisayâ; Visayan
- Geographic distribution: Visayas, most parts of Mindanao, Mimaropa in the Philippines, Sabah in Malaysia, North Kalimantan in Indonesia and immigrant communities
- Ethnicity: Visayans
- Linguistic classification: Austronesian: Malayo-Polynesian; Philippine; Greater Central Philippine; Central Philippine; Bisayan
- Proto-language: Proto-Bisayan
- Subdivisions: Asi Cebuan Central Bisayan West Bisayan South Bisayan

Language codes
- Glottolog: bisa1268
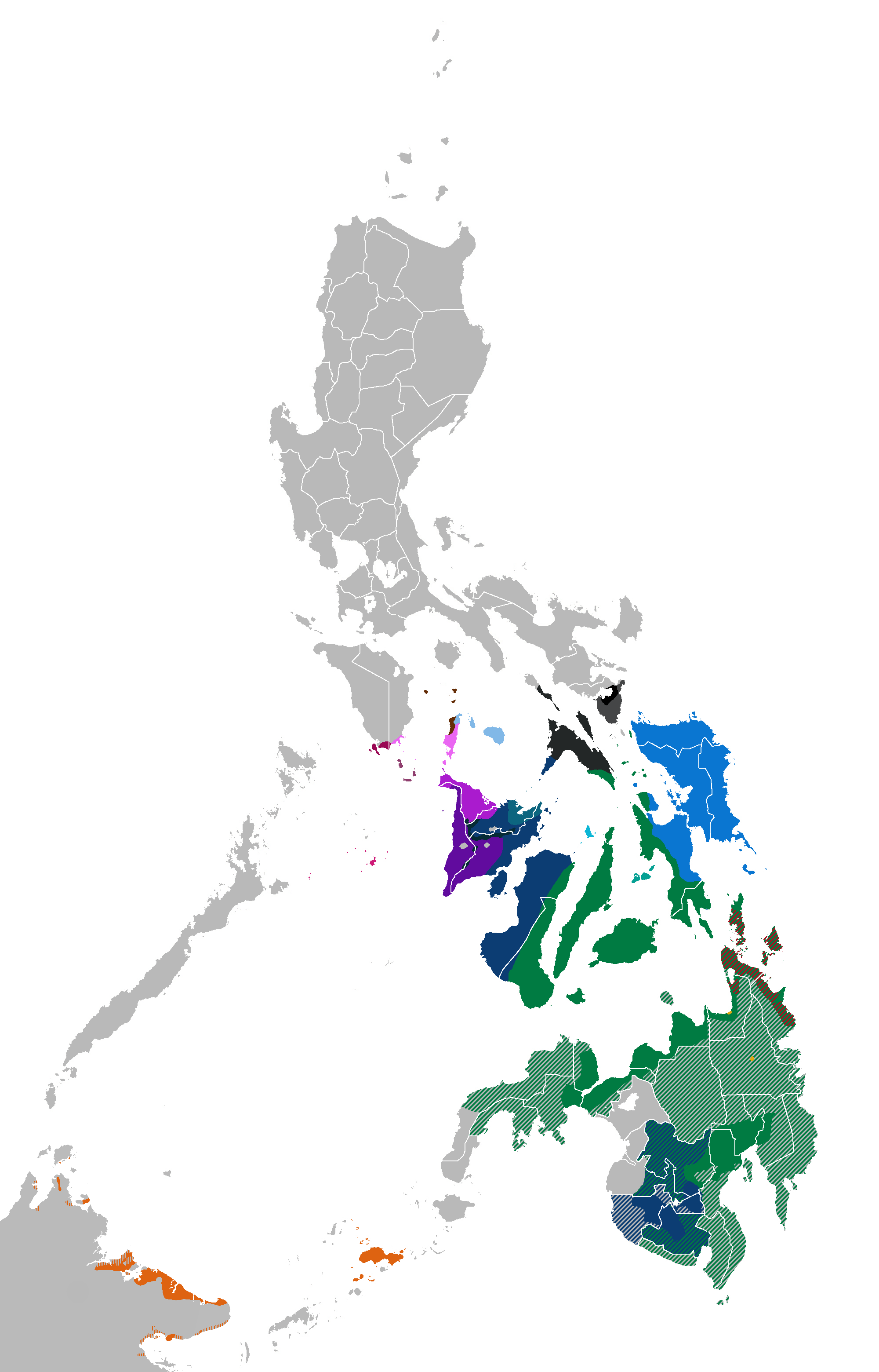
- Geographic extent of Bisayan languages based on Ethnologue and the National Statistics Office 2000 Census of Population and Housing Cebuan Cebuano Central Bisayan Waray Baybayanon Kabalian Hiligaynon Capiznon Romblomanon Bantayanon Porohanon Masbateño Southern Sorsogon Northern Sorsogon West Bisayan Cuyonon Caluyanon Aklanon Karay-a Inonhan Ratagnon Asi Asi South Bisayan Surigaonon Butuanon Tausug Other legend Widespread/L2 use of Cebuano Widespread/L2 use of Hiligaynon

The Bisayan languages or Visayan languages are a subgroup of the Austronesian languages spoken in the Philippines. They are most closely related to (though not mutually intelligible with) Tagalog and the Bikol languages, all of which are part of the Central Philippine languages. Most Bisayan languages are spoken in the whole Visayas section of the country, but they are also spoken in the southern part of the Bicol Region (particularly in Masbate and Sorsogon where several dialects of Waray are spoken), islands south of Luzon, such as those that make up Romblon, most of the areas of Mindanao and the province of Sulu located southwest of Mindanao. Some residents of Metro Manila also speak one of the Bisayan languages.

Over 30 languages constitute the Bisayan language family. The Bisayan language with the most speakers is Cebuano, spoken by 20 million people as a native language in Central Visayas, parts of Eastern Visayas, and most of Mindanao. Two other well-known and widespread Bisayan languages are Hiligaynon (Ilonggo), spoken by 9 million in most of Western Visayas and Soccsksargen; and Waray-Waray, spoken by 6 million in Eastern Visayas region. Prior to colonization, the script and calligraphy of most of the Visayan peoples was the badlit, closely related to the Tagalog baybayin.

== Nomenclature ==
Native speakers of most Bisayan languages, especially Cebuano, Hiligaynon and Waray, not only refer to their language by their local name, but also by Bisaya or Binisaya, meaning Bisayan language. This is misleading or may lead to confusion as different languages may be called Bisaya by their respective speakers despite their languages being mutually unintelligible.

However, languages that are classified within the Bisayan language family but spoken natively in places outside of the Visayas do not use the self-reference Bisaya or Binisaya. To speakers of Cuyonon, Surigaonon, Butuanon and Tausug, the term Visayan usually refers to either Cebuano or Hiligaynon.

There have been no proven accounts to verify the origins of Bisaya. However, there is an ethnic group in Malaysia and Brunei who call themselves with the same name. However, these ethnic groups in the Philippines must not be confused with those in Borneo.

== Evidence ==
David Zorc lists the following innovations as features defining the Bisayan languages as a group (Zorc 1977:241). Tausug is noted to have diverged early from the group and may have avoided some sound changes that affected the others.

1. *lC, *Cl > *Cl (where C is any consonant not *h, *q, or *l)
2. *qC, *Cq > *Cq (MOST) *qC, *Cq > *qC (Tausug, and most Bikol languages)

Reflexes of PCPh and PPh
	*qaldaw	*qalsəm	*qitlug	*baqguh
Tagalic	*qaːdaw (Tag: ˈʔaː.raw)	*qaːsəm (Tag: ˈʔaː.sim)	*qitlug (Tag: ʔit.ˈlog)	*baːguh (Tag: ˈbaː.go)
Bikol	*qaldaw (Naga: ˈʔal.daw)	*qalsəm (Naga: ˈʔal.som)	*qitlug (Iriga: ʔit.ˈlog)	*baqguh (Naga: ˈbaʔ.go)
Bisayan	*qadlaw (ALL: ˈʔad.law)	*qasləm (Kin: ˈʔas.ləm, Ceb: ˈʔas.lum)	*qitlug (MOST: ˈʔit.log)	*bagquh (Ceb: ˈbag.ʔo)

== Internal classification ==
David Zorc gives the following internal classification for the Bisayan languages (Zorc 1977:32). The five primary branches are South, Cebuan, Central, Banton, and West. However, Zorc notes that the Bisayan language family is more like a dialect continuum rather than a set of readily distinguishable languages.

The South Bisayan languages are considered to have diverged first, followed by Cebuan and then the rest of the three branches. Also, in the Visayas section, the province of Romblon has the most linguistic diversity, as languages from three primary Bisayan branches are spoken there: Romblomanon from Central Bisayan, Inunhan from Western Bisayan and Banton (which has an independent Bisayan branch).

Notably, Baybayanon and Porohanon have Warayan substrata, indicating a more widespread distribution of Waray before Cebuano speakers started to expand considerably starting from the mid-1800s.

A total of 36 varieties are listed below. Individual languages are marked by italics.

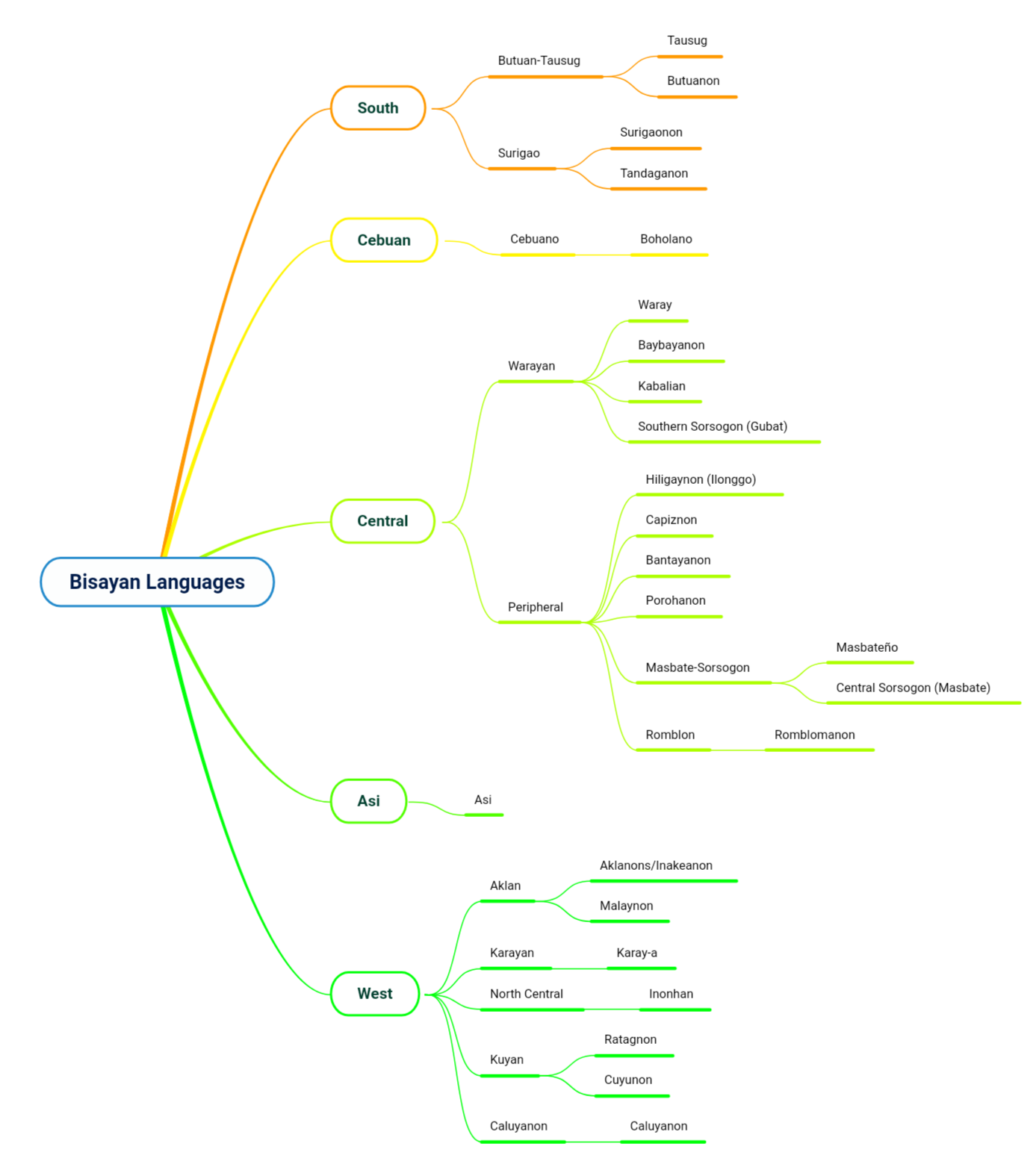
Bisayan Languages Tree Chart

- Bisayan
  - 1. South (spoken on the northeastern coast of Mindanao)
    - Butuan-Tausug
      - Tausug
      - Butuanon
    - Surigao
      - Surigaonon
      - Tandaganon
  - 2. Cebuan (spoken in Cebu, Bohol, Siquijor, Eastern Negros, western Leyte and northern, southeastern and northwestern parts of Mindanao)
    - Cebuan
      - Cebuano
        - Boholano
  - 3. Central (spoken across most of the Visayan region)
    - Warayan (spoken in eastern Leyte, Biliran and Samar)
      - Waray
      - Baybayanon
      - Kabalian
      - Southern Sorsogon (Gubat)
    - Peripheral
      - Hiligaynon (Ilonggo) (spoken in eastern Panay and Guimaras, Western Negros and south-central Mindanao)
      - Capiznon
      - Bantayanon
      - Porohanon
      - Masbate-Sorsogon
        - Masbateño
        - Central Sorsogon (Masbate)
    - Romblon (also the name of the province)
      - Romblomanon
  - 4. Asi (spoken in northwestern Romblon Province)
      - Asi
  - 5. West
    - Aklan (spoken in northwestern Panay)
      - Aklanon/Inakeanon
      - Malaynon
    - Karayan
      - Karay-a (spoken in western and inland Panay)
    - North-Central (spoken on Tablas Island and the southern tip of Mindoro)
      - Inonhan (language related to Karayan)
    - Kuyan (spoken in the archipelagos west of Panay and Romblon as well as the southern tip of Mindoro)
      - Ratagnon
      - Cuyonon
    - Caluyanon
      - Caluyanon

The auxiliary language of Eskayan is grammatically Bisayan, but has essentially no Bisayan (or Philippine) vocabulary.

Magahat and Karolanos, both spoken in Negros, are unclassified within Bisayan.

== Names and locations ==
Zorc (1977: 14–15) lists the following names and locations of Bisayan languages. The recently documented languages Karolanos, Magahat, and Kabalian are not listed in Zorc (1977).

Subgroup	Language	Other names	Location(s)
Banton	Banton		Banton Island, Romblon
Banton	Sibale	Banton	Sibale (Maestre de Campo) Island, Romblon
Banton	Odionganon	Corcuera Island dialect	Odiongan area, Tablas Island, Romblon
Western	Alcantaranon		Alcantara, Tablas Island, Romblon
Western	Dispoholnon		San Andres (Despujols), Tablas Island
Western	Looknon	Inunhan	Look and Santa Fe, Tablas Island
Western	Datagnon	Ratagnun, Latagnun	Ilin Island and Magsaysay, Occidental Mindoro
Western	Santa Teresa		Barrio Santa Teresa of Magsaysay, Occidental Mindoro
Western	Bulalakawnon		Bulalacao (San Pedro), southern Oriental Mindoro
Western	Semirara		Semirara Island Group
Western	Cuyonon	Cuyuno	Cuyo Island, except Agutaya; coastal area around Puerto Princesa, Palawan; Culion and Busuanga Islands
Western	Aklanon	Akeanon, Aklano, Aklan	Aklan and northern Capiz, Panay Island
Western	Pandan		Pandan area, Antique, including the Buruanga, Aklan area of Panay
Western	Kinaray-a	Antiqueño, Hinaray-a, Sulud, Panayano	most of Antique, Panay Island; most inland areas of Iloilo and Capiz; southern Guimaras Island off of Iloilo
Western	Gimaras		Guimaras Island, Iloilo
Central	Romblomanon	Niromblon, Sibuyanon	Romblon and Sibuyan Island; San Agustin area, Tablas Island
Central	Bantayan		Bantayan Island
Central	Capiznon		Capiz and northeastern Iloilo, Panay Island
Central	Hiligaynon	Ilonggo	most of Iloilo, Panay Island; western Guimaras and Negros Occidental
Central	Kawayan		Cauayan, Negros Occidental
Central	Masbate	Masbate	Masbate and Ticao Island
Central	Camotes		Camotes Island, between Cebu and Leyte
Central	Northern Samar	Samareño, Waray-Waray	northern Samar
Central	Samar-Leyte	Samareño, Waray-Waray, Sinamar	central Samar; northern half of Leyte
Central	Waray	Samareño, Waray-Waray, Binisayâ	southern Samar Island, Eastern Samar
Central	Sorsogon	Sorsogonon, Bikol	northern Sorsogon, Bikol
Central	Gubat	Sorsogonon	southern Sorsogon, Bikol (including Gubat)
Cebuan	Cebuano	Sugbuanon, Sugbuhanon, Cebuan, Sebuano	Cebu Island; Negros Oriental; eastern Visayas and the coastal areas of northern and eastern Mindanao
Cebuan	Boholano	Bol-anon	Bohol Island
Cebuan	Leyte	Kanâ, Leyteño	central western Leyte; immigrants to Dinagat Island
Southern	Butuanon		Butuan, Agusan del Norte area
Southern	Surigaonon	Jaun Bisayâ	Surigao del Norte
Southern	Jaun-Jaun	Siargaonon	Siargao Island, Surigao del Norte
Southern	Kantilan		Cantilan and Madrid, Surigao del Sur
Southern	Naturalis		Tandag and Tago, Surigao del Sur
Southern	Tausug	Moro, Taw Sug	Jolo Island; southern and western Palawan

== Comparisons ==
The following comparisons are from data gathered by Zorc (1997).

=== Personal-noun case markers ===
Subgroup	Variety	Singular			Plural		
Subgroup	Variety	NOM	ERG	OBL	NOM	ERG	OBL
Banton	Banton	si	ni	kang	sa	na	kaná
Banton	Sibale	si	ni	kang	sína	nína	kína
Banton	Odionganon	si	ni	kang	sa	na	kaná
Western, Inonhan	Alcantaranon						
Western, Inonhan	Dispoholnon	si	ni	kay	sánday	nánday	kánday
Western, Inonhan	Looknon	si	ni	kay	sánday	nánday	kánday
Western, Kuyan, Ratagnon	Datagnon	si	ni	ki	sánda	nánda	kanánda
Western, Kuyan, Ratagnon	Santa Teresa	si	ni	kay	sánday	nánday	kánday
Western, Inonhan	Bulalakawnon	si	ni	kay	sánday	nánday	kánday
Western, Kuyan, Caluyanon	Semirara	si	ni	kay	sánday	nánday	kánday
Western, Kuyan	Cuyonon	si	ni	ki	sanda	nanda	kanda
Western	Aklanon	si	ni	kay	sánda(y)	nánda(y)	kánda(y)
Western, Kinaray-a	Pandan	si	ni	kay	sánday	nánday	kánday
Western, Kinaray-a	Kinaray-a	si	ni	kay	sánday	nánday	kánday
Western, Kinaray-a	Gimaras						
Central	Romblomanon	si	ni	kay	siná	niná	kiná
Central, Peripheral	Bantayan						
Central, Peripheral	Capiznon	si	ni	kay	sánday	nánday	kánday
Central, Peripheral	Hiligaynon	si	ni	kay	silá ni	níla ni	sa íla ni
Central, Peripheral	Kawayan						
Central, Peripheral	Masbate	si	ni	kan	sinda	ninda	kanda
Central, Peripheral	Camotes						
Central, Warayan, Waray	Northern Samar	si	ni	kan	sirá	nirá	kánda
Central, Warayan, Waray	Samar-Leyte	si	ni	kan	sirá	níra	kánda
Central, Warayan, Waray	Waray	hi	ni	kan	hirá	níra	kánda
Central, Peripheral	Sorsogon (Central Sorsoganon)	si	ni	kan	sirá	nirá	kánda
Central, Warayan	Gubat (South Sorsoganon)	si	ni	kan	sirá	nirá	kánda
Cebuan	Cebuano	si	ni	kang	silá si siláng	níla ni níang	sa íla ni, sa ílang
Cebuan	Boholano	si	ni	kang	síla	níla	kaníla
Cebuan	Leyte				silang	nilang	sa ilang
Southern, Butuan-Tausug	Butuanon	si	ni	kang	sinda	ninda	kanda
Southern, Surigaonon	Surigaonon	si	ni	kay	síla	níla	kaníla
Southern, Surigaonon	Jaun-Jaun	si	ni	kan	síla si	níla ni	díla ni
Southern, Surigaonon	Kantilan						
Southern, Tandaganon	Naturalis						
Southern, Butuan-Tausug	Tausug	hi	hi	kan	hinda	hinda	kanda

=== Common-name case markers ===
Subgroup	Variety	NOM			ERG			OBL
Subgroup	Variety	Indefinite	Definite		Indefinite	Definite		
Subgroup	Variety		Past	Nonpast		Past	Nonpast	Future
Banton	Banton	-y	kag		it	ittong		sa
Banton	Sibale	-y	kag		it	itkag		sa
Banton	Odionganon	-y	kag		it	ittong		sa
Western, Inonhan	Alcantaranon		ang		it	tang		sa
Western, Inonhan	Dispoholnon		ang		it	kang		sa
Western, Inonhan	Looknon		ang		it	tang		sa
Western, Kuyan, Ratagnon	Datagnon		ang		#	ang		sa
Western, Kuyan, Ratagnon	Santa Teresa		ang			kang		sa
Western, Inonhan	Bulalakawnon		ang		it	tang		sa
Western, Kuyan, Caluyanon	Semirara		ang			kang		sa
Western, Kuyan	Cuyonon		ang		i	i-ang		sa
Western	Aklanon	-y	ro~do		it	ku		sa
Western, Kinaray-a	Pandan		ang		it	kang		sa
Western, Kinaray-a	Kinaray-a		ang		ti	kang		sa
Western, Kinaray-a	Gimaras		ang		ti	kang		sa
Central	Romblomanon		ang		ning	nang		sa
Central, Peripheral	Bantayan		ang		sing	sang		sa
Central, Peripheral	Capiznon		ang		sing	sang		sa
Central, Peripheral	Hiligaynon		ang		sing	sang		sa
Central, Peripheral	Kawayan		ang		sing	sang		sa
Central, Peripheral	Masbate		an		sin	san		sa
Central, Peripheral	Camotes	in	an		sin	san		sa
Central, Warayan, Waray	Northern Samar	in	an		si(n)	sa(n)		sa
Central, Warayan, Waray	Samar-Leyte	in	an	it	sin	san	sit	sa
Central, Warayan, Waray	Waray	in	an	it	hin	han	hit	ha
Central, Peripheral	Sorsogon (Central Sorsoganon)		an		sin	san		sa
Central, Warayan	Gubat (South Sorsoganon)		an		sin	san		sa
Cebuan	Cebuano	-y	ang		ug	sa		sa
Cebuan	Boholano		ang		ug	sa		sa
Cebuan	Leyte		ang		ug	sa		sa
Southern, Butuan-Tausug	Butuanon		ang			hong		sa
Southern, Surigaonon	Surigaonon		ang			nang		sa
Southern, Surigaonon	Jaun-Jaun		an			nan		sa
Southern, Surigaonon	Kantilan		ang			nang		sa
Southern, Tandaganon	Naturalis		ang			nang		sa
Southern, Butuan-Tausug	Tausug	in			sin			ha

== Reconstruction ==
Proto-Bisayan
- Reconstruction of: Bisayan languages
- Reconstructed ancestors: Proto-Austronesian: Proto-Malayo-Polynesian; Proto-Philippine

David Zorc's reconstruction of Proto-Bisayan had 15 consonants and 4 vowels (Zorc 1977:201). Vowel length, primary stress (penultimate and ultimate), and secondary stress (pre-penultimate) are also reconstructed by Zorc.

Proto-Bisayan Consonants
		Bilabial	Dental	Palatal	Velar	Glottal
Plosive	Voiceless	p	t		k	ʔ
Plosive	Voiced	b	d		ɡ	
Nasal		m	n		ŋ	
Fricative			s			h
Lateral			l			
Approximant		w		j		

Proto-Bisayan Vowels
Height	Front	Central	Back
Close	i /i/		u /u/
Mid		ə /ə/	
Open		a /a/	

== See also ==
- Bisalog
- Bislish
- Bisakol languages
- Classical Cebuano
- Visayans
