= Bantayanon language =

Austronesian language spoken in the Philippines

Bantayanon
- Binantayanon
- Native to: Philippines
- Region: Bantayan Island, Cebu Province
- Native speakers: 72,000 (2007)
- Language family: Austronesian: Malayo-Polynesian; Philippine; Central Philippine; Bisayan; Central Bisayan; Peripheral; Bantayanon

Language codes
- ISO 639-3: bfx
- Glottolog: bant1293

The Bantayanon language is the regional language of the Bantayan islands in the Philippines. It is a part of the Bisayan language family and is closely related to Waray and Hiligaynon. There are three dialects of Bantayanon, based in the three municipalities that comprise the island group: Binantayanun (in Bantayan), Linawisanun (in Madridejos), and Sinantapihanun (in Santa Fe), the most idiosyncratic of the three. There are also significant dialectal differences between the speech patterns of those that live in the town centers and those that live outside of the more rural areas of the islands.

== History of the Bantayanon language ==
The first mention of the language spoken on the Bantayan islands seems to be from the Spanish historian and Jesuit missionary Ignacio Alcina, who wrote in 1668,

"Finally, it could have happened that people from various larger or smaller islands passed over to the others, as is an established fact among them. For instance, those on the Island of Bantayan, which is near Cebu, are actually descendants of the people living on Samar Island and on the western side or opposite that of Ibabao. Today, they admit that they are related by blood because the latter were populated in more recent times." (translation by editors)

The substratum of Bantayanon is that Old Waray dialect that moved across Bantayan and eventually onto Panay Island, and later Bantayanon was heavily influenced in its lexicon by Cebuano.

== Modern scholarship on the Bantayanon language ==
The only published scholarship on the Bantayanon language is a Master of Arts thesis presented to Mindanao State University - Iligan Institute of Technology (MSU-IIT) by Minda Carabio-Sexon, in which she looks at the lexical relationship between Bantayanon and its neighboring languages, presents findings from mutual-intelligibility tests with related languages, and provides a sociolinguistic profile of the island's inhabitants. She also provides transcriptions and English translations of two of her collected interviews.

There is currently a documentation project of Bantayanon underway by researcher Jarrette K. Allen, a PhD candidate at Tulane University in New Orleans, LA.

== Phonology and orthography ==
Bantayanon has sixteen consonantal phonemes and three vocalic phonemes. The following orthography is the one currently being developed, since Bantayanon is still considered an undocumented/undescribed language with no literary history. It draws on the orthographies of Cebuano, Hiligaynon, and Filipino, but also diverges in some ways.

The Pulmonic Consonant Phonemes of Bantayanon
		bilabial	dental (apical)	alveolar (apical)	palatal	velar	glottal
nasal		m	n			ŋ	
plosive	voiceless	p	t			k	ʔ
plosive	voiced	b	d			g	
tap/flap				ɾ			
fricative				s			h
approximant	central				j	w	
approximant	lateral	(w)		l			

All final plosives in Bantayanon are unreleased. It has not been demonstrated that Bantayanon aspirates any consonants. There are no syllabic consonants in Bantayanon.

The following phonemes are written as they are in the IPA (above table): p b t d k g m n s h w l.

These phonemes are written as such:

- If a root in Bantayanon does not begin with another consonant, it begins with a glottal stop /ʔ/, but this glottal is only ever indicated in the orthography when that glottal appears word-medially due to affixation or reduplication.
- The glottal stop /ʔ/ is written as a hyphen (-) in all word-medial positions. This is atypical of Central Bisayan languages, which assume a glottal between vowels (i.e. aa = /aʔa/). However, it is necessary to write long vowels in Bantayanon, for they are contrastive, and this is done by doubling the vowel (i.e. aa = /aː/) and marking all word-medial glottals (a-a = /aʔa/).
- The glottal stop /ʔ/ in word-final positions (always over a vowel) is indicated with a grave accent (e.g. isdà /ʔis.dáʔ/).
- The velar nasal /ŋ/ is written with ng and can appear word-initially, medially, and finally.
- The tap or flap /ɾ/ is written with an r.
- The glides /w/ and /j/ are written with a w and a y, respectively.

The Vocalic Phonemes of Bantayanon
	FRONT	CENTRAL	BACK
HIGH	i		u
LOW		a	

Like Cebuano, Bantayanon has only three vocalic phonemes. There is no /o/ or /e/ in Bantayanon, although many use the letters o and e when writing. All syllables in Bantayanon contain one and only one vowel.
