= Boholano dialect =

Variety of the Cebuano language

Boholano
- Bol-anon, Binol-anon, Bisayâ nga Binol-anon, Binisayâ nga Bol-anon
- Region: Bohol, Southern Leyte and parts of Northern Mindanao and Caraga Region
- Ethnicity: Boholano people
- Language family: Austronesian: Malayo-Polynesian; Philippine; Central Philippine; Bisayan; Cebuano; Boholano

Language codes
- ISO 639-3: –
- Glottolog: boho1237
- IETF: ceb-u-sd-phboh

Boholano (Cebuano: Binol-anon) is a variant of the Cebuano language spoken in the island province of Bohol in the Visayas and a major portion of Southern Leyte, as well as parts of Mindanao, particularly in Northern Mindanao and Caraga. It is sometimes erroneously described as a separate language even though Binol-anon originated as a dialect continuum of the Cebuano language.

Boholano, especially as spoken in central Bohol, can be distinguished from other Cebuano variants by a few phonetic changes:

- The semivowel y is pronounced [dʒ] as is the ll sound (similar to Spanish Yeísmo): iya is pronounced [iˈdʒa];
- Ako is pronounced as [aˈho];
- Intervocalic l is occasionally pronounced as [w] when following u or o: kulang is pronounced as [ˈkuwaŋ] (the same as Metro Cebu dialect).

== History ==
The Bohol dialect developed in the region after the Cebuano language arrived there from Cebu. The Cebuano language, descended from Proto-Austronesian (ca. 6000 years ago), originated in the Sugbo heartland and then "has spread from its base in Cebu" to Bohol, thus beginning the Bohol Cebuano dialect.
