= Josefino Cenizal =

Filipino actor, director and composer (1916-2015

- Born: 14 September 1919; Tanza, Cavite, Philippine Islands
- Died: 27 February 2015 (aged 95)
- Occupations: composer, director, actor

Josefino Cenizal (14 September 1919 – 27 March 2015) was a Filipino actor, director, and composer from Tanza, Cavite. In 1937, he began to direct music films at Parlatone-Hispano Films, which is where his musical career began. In 2010, he received the Dangal ng Filscap Award. His career spanned from the late 1930s to the 1970s. He is famous for adapting "Ang Pasko Ay Sumapit" in 1938 with lyrics provided by Levi Celerio from the original Cebuano Christmas carol entitled "Kasadya Ning Taknaa" composed by Vicente D. Rubi and Mariano Vestil.

== Personal life ==
Josefino Cenizal was born to Rosario (Ymzon) Cenizal and Julio Cenizal on September 14, 1919, in Tanza, Cavite. He is also the only son of four children. His mother was influential to his musical roots, enrolling him at a music school at the age of 8. She also taught him a few instruments including the violin. Cenizal was married to fellow actor, Olivia Cenizal until her death in 2008. They had one child named Moppet.

== Education ==
He studied at Manila Law College in 1948 and at the Lyceum of the Philippines in 1954. He stopped studying law to pursue his musical career.

== Career ==
His mother taught him violin and a method called solfeggio. Cenizal also taught himself to play the banjo. While studying at U.P. Conservatory of Music, he also played piano at late night radio stations when he was young. This paved the way for his career overseas. Cenizal honed his craft further by playing music in cruises during the summer At 17, he got his first job—conducting the US Army and Navy Club. He continued pursuing music while studying before he quit to pursue his passion. He was also a musical director/composer in several films in the late 1940s such as "Fort Santiago," "Kamagong:Bayani ng Mahirap"(Mahogany:The Poor's Hero) and "Siete Dolores"(Seven Dolores). From the late 1940s until his death, Cenizal composed over 30 songs.

== Acting ==
He also starred in some films including Rosa Birhen(1940) “Rose Virgin” and Bicol Express(1957), and Milagrosang Kamay "Miraculous Hand" (1961).

== Directing ==
Cenizal also tried his hand at directing. He was able to direct one of his own films, “Rosa Birhen” while acting. It was also during this time that he composed one of his famous songs called "Hindi Kita Malimot", which was used in the said film.

== Works ==
Year	Title
2005	Illusion
1995	"Nasaan Ka?" (Where are you?)
1980s	"Pobre"(Poor)
1966	Dearest One: A Million Thanks to You
1965	Mr. Burot-Super Agent
1963	"Ulilang Cowboy" (Orphaned Cowboy)
1963	"Adonis Abril"
1962	"Prinsesang Mandirigma" (Warrior Princess)
1962	"Thor"
1962	"4 Valientes"
1961	"Milagrosang Kamay"(Miraculous Hand)
1961	"Krusaldo"
1960	"Wala Kang Kapantay" (There's No One Like You)
1960	"Seksing-Seksi Mapanghina"(Sexy Attractive)
1960s	"Ang Pasko Ay Sumapit"(Christmas Has Come)
1959	"Pabo Real"(Peacock)
1957	"Pandaggo ni Neneng"(Neneng's Dance)
1955	"El jugador"
1955	"Pangako ng Puso"(The Promise of the Heart)
1955	"Taong Paniki"(Batman)
1952	"Bohemyo"(Bohemian)
1952	"Gamugamong naging Lawin"(A Moth that became a Hawk)
1951	"La Roca Trinidad"
1951	"Satur"
1951	"Pagtutuos"(Fighting)
1950	"Balaraw"(Spear)
1949	"Ang Lumang Bahay sa Gulod"(The Old House at the Ridge)
1949	"Kidlat sa Silangan"(Lightning in the East)
1949	"Capas"
1949	"Siyudad sa Ilalim ng Lupa"(City Underground)
1949	"Kayummangi"(Fair-skin)
1949	"Ang Lumang Simbahan"(The Old Church)
1949	"Kumander Sundang" (Commander Dagger)
1948	"Sierra Madre, bundok ng hiwaga"(Sierra Madre, Mountain of Miracle)
1948	"Dolorosa"
1948	"Forbidden Women"
1947	"Kamagong:Bayani ng Mahirap"(Mahogany:The Poor's Hero)
--	"Masaganang Kabukiran"(Prosperous Land)
--	"Ang Pagibig Ko'y Ingatan Mo" (Take Care of My Love)
1939	"Hindi Kita Malimot"(I Can't Forget You)
1933	"Ang Pasko ay Sumapit"(Christmas Has Come ) with Levi Celerio
