= Noche Buena =

Noche Buena or Nochebuena may refer to:

- "Noche Buena" (song), a Filipino Christmas standard

== Beverages and food ==
- Noche Buena, a Mexican beer from Cuauhtémoc Moctezuma Brewery
- Noche Buena, a cheese marketed by Sigma Alimentos

== Other uses ==
- Nochebuena, Christmas Eve in Spanish-speaking countries and other places influenced by Spain
- Noche buena, Euphorbia pulcherrima or poinsettia
