= Forbidden Women =

Forbidden Women refers to the following films:

- Forbidden Women (1948 film), Philippine film
- Forbidden Women (1959 film), Egyptian film

== See also ==
- The Forbidden Woman (disambiguation)
