= Vicente Rubi =

Filipino Visayan musician and composer of Kasadya Ning Taknaa

Vicente D. Rubi
- Also known as: Noy Inting
- Born: January 23, 1903; Cebu City, Philippines
- Died: November 12, 1980 (aged 77) Cebu, Philippines
- Genres: Christmas carols; Kundiman
- Occupation: Musician
- Instrument: Guitar

Vicente Daclan Rubi (January 23, 1903 – November 12, 1980) was a Filipino Visayan musician from Cebu, Philippines, best known for composing the Philippine Christmas carol Kasadyaa Ning Taknaa, which was translated into Tagalog, Ang Pasko ay Sumapit, by National Artist Levi Celerio. He was one of the top 100 Cebuano personalities according to The Freeman.

== Early life ==
Vicente D. Rubi was born the youngest of four children in Kamagayan District, Cebu City, on January 22, 1903. Rubi was a respected name known for musical talent in Cebu province, especially in Mactan. Acquiring the basic elementary education and known by his nickname "Noy Inting", he worked in sugar farms in the provincial towns of Cebu. He was married to Brigida Aseniero, fathering four children namely Rudolfo, Alberto, Ludivina, and Edilberto.

== Career ==
A composer of daygon (carol) and balitaw (song), he was a fan of musical dramas and plays which were popular during his time. While he created musical compositions through a guitar, his wife would help him set them on to the music sheets. He had composed more than a hundred songs, and among his works were Pasko Na, Among Daygon, Nag-ambahan, Pasko nga Halandumon, and Maglipay Kita. One of his compositions, Carmela, remained a popular Cebuano kundiman interpreted by present-day balladeers.

== Later years ==
A few months before his demise, he composed his final song, Mahanaw ang Tanan. He died a poor widower, succumbing to prostate cancer on November 12, 1980, and his body was buried at the Carreta cemetery. Eight years later, the court in Cebu ruled in his favor and ordered unpaid royalties to be given to his estate.

== Awards ==
Rubi received posthumous awards for his contribution to Cebuano and Philippine music and was recognized by the province of Cebu, Cebu Arts Foundation, Mayor Florentino Solo of Cebu City, and Basic Industries Foundation. He was also the recipient of the Jose R. Gullas Awards and considered one of the top 100 Cebuano personalities.

== Works ==
According to The Freeman, below are some of his works.

- Among Daygon
- Carmela
- Harana
- Kasadyaa Ning Taknaa
- Laylay sa Kalanggaman
- Maglipay Kita
- Nag Ambahan
- Pasko Na
- Pasko Nga Halandumon
- Walay Balatian
- Bidlisiw
- Gililong Ko Lang
- Mitu-o Ako
- Sayo sa Kabutagon (Early Morning)
- Nagsaad ug Nanumpa (Promising and Vowing)
