= List of Filipino Christmas carols and songs =

This article lists Christmas carols and songs traditionally sung by Filipinos during the local Christmas season. Like much Filipino music, some of these songs trace their origins to the Spanish and American colonial periods, while others were composed as part of the OPM movement.

== Daigon ==
It is an old Ilonggo Christmas carol in Hiligaynon. Daigon is the Hiligaynon term for caroling. Ilonggos are fond of singing this song caroling from house to house. It is sometimes used as a piece for Christmas carol choral competitions.

Daigon (Hiligaynon)

O dungga man ninyo
Ang makaluluoy
Nga yari sa idalom
Nga nagapasilong
Nagahulat sang inyo
Maayong kabubut on
Nagabatas sang tun-og
Sining kagab ihon

Sa pagkabulahan nga gab-i
Ang amon karon nga pagkari;
Kay natao ang manunubos
Sa kalibutan nga luhaan

Paalam na sa inyo
Mga kautoran
Kag kabay sang diwa
Kamo kaluoyan

Paalam paalam
Sa inyo nga tanan
Kay kami na karon
Ang magataliwan.

Christmas Carol (English) (Note: NOTE: This is only popular in Davao.)

Oh listen everyone
To the miserable
Which is below
That sheltering
Looking forward to your
Goodwill on
Withstands dew
Tonight

Oh what a blessed night
With our coming;
For a redeemer is born
In a world of tears

Goodbye to you
Brothers and sisters
And may the spirit of Christmas
Bless you

Goodbye goodbye
To all of you
Because we are now
passing.

== "Himig ng Pasko" ==
"Himig Pasko" or "Himig ng Pasko" is a Christmas carol written by Serapio Y. Ramos in the 1960s. The opening line has become a popular allusion as it describes the Amihan, or cool, northeasterly trade winds that prevail around December.

Himig ng Pasko (Tagalog)

Malamíg ang simoy ng hangin
Kay sayá ng bawat damdamin.
Ang tibók ng puso sa dibdíb
Para bang hulog na ng langit

Koro
Himig ng Pasko’y laganap
Mayro’ng siglâ ang lahat
Wala ang kalungkutan
Lubós ang kasayahan

Himig ng Pasko’y umiiral
Sa loob ng bawat tahanan
Masayá ang mga tanawin
May awit ang simoy ng hangin.

*(ultin ang koro at huling saknóng)

Music of Christmas (English)

The breeze of the cold air:
How happy are each [person's] emotions
The heartbeat in the chest
Is as though heaven-sent.

Chorus
[The] Music of Christmas is widespread
All are lively
There is no sadness
Happiness is full.

[The] Music of Christmas pervades
In the inside every home
Happy are the sights
There is song in the breeze of the wind.

*(repeat chorus and last verse)

== "Namamasko" ==
"Namamasko" is part of a series known as Maligayang Pasko, and was originally an untitled song now commonly known by its incipit. Though more playful in tone as carolling is seen as a pastime reserved for children, its theme is similar to the English carol Here We Come A-wassailing/A-caroling.

Sa Maybahay ang Aming Batì (Tagalog)

Sa maybahay, ang aming bati,
"Merry Christmas!" na maluwalhati
Ang pag-ibig, 'pag siyang naghari
Araw-araw ay magiging pasko lagi!

Koro:
Ang sanhi po ng pagparito, hihingi po ng aguinaldo
Kung sakali kami'y perwisyo
Pasensya na kayo, kami'y namamasko

To The Householder We Greet (English)

To our host we'd like to say,
A "Merry Christmas!" for you and me,
When Love, if it doth reign,
every day will be joyful, always!

Chorus:
The reason we have come
is to ask for kara (money).
If we happen to be a bother,
please be patient, for we are singing!

== "Ang Pasko Ay Sumapit" ==
"Maligayang Pasko at Masaganang Bagong Taon" (English: Merry Christmas and a Prosperous New Year), popularly known as Ang Pasko ay Sumapit (English: Christmas is Coming), is a traditional Filipino Christmas song. It was originally composed by Vicente D. Rubi and Mariano Vestil in 1933 as Kasadya ning Táknaa (English: How Blissful is this Season). A version of the song in Tagalog was used by Josefino Cenizal as a film score for the film Ang Pugad ng Aguila ("Hawk's Nest") in 1938. National Artist Levi Celerio also wrote Tagalog lyrics to the song during the 1950s. The song is still sung today in various communities, especially in churches both in the Philippines and abroad (usually during the end of the Holy Mass).

Ang Pasko ay Sumapit is in public domain as an unprotected work. In his 2011 press statement, former Senator Manny Villar claimed that if the Christmas carol and Celerio's other songs were protected by copyright earlier, Celerio would have not died a pauper.

Kasadya ni'ng Táknaa (Cebuano)

Kasadya ni'ng Táknaa
Dapit sa kahimayaan.
Mao ray among nakita,
Ang panagway nga masanagon.

Buláhan ug buláhan
Ang tagbaláy nga giawitan.
Awit nga halandumon,
Ug sa tanang pasko magmalípayon.

Bag-ong tuíg, bág-ong kinabúhì.
Dinuyogan sa átong mga pagbati.
Atong awiton ug atong laylayon
Aron magmalípayon.

Kasadya ni'ng Táknaa
Dapit sa kahimayaan.
Mao ray among nakita,
Ang panagway nga masanagon.

Buláhan ug buláhan
Ang tagbaláy nga giawitan.
Awit nga halandumon,
Ug sa tanang pasko magmalípayon.

Ang Pasko ay Sumapit (Tagalog)

Ang Pasko ay sumapit
Tayo ay mangagsiawit
Ng magagandáng himig
Dahil sa ang Diyos ay pag-ibig

Nang si Kristo'y isilang
May tatlóng haring nagsidalaw
At ang bawat isá ay nagsipaghandóg
Ng tanging alay.

Koro:
Bagong Taón ay magbagong-buhay
Nang lumigayà ang ating Bayan
Tayo'y magsikap upang makamtán
Natin ang kasaganaan!

Tayo'y mangagsiawit
Habang ang mundó'y tahimik.
Ang araw ay sumapit
Ng Sanggól na dulot ng langit.

Tayo ay magmahalan,
Ating sundín ang Gintóng Aral
At magbuhát ngayon,
Kahit hindî Paskô ay magbigayan!

Ang Pasko Ay Sumapit/Kasadya ni'ng Táknaa (Bilingual)

Tagalog:
Ang Pasko ay sumapit
Tayo ay mangagsiawit
Ng magagandáng himig
Dahil sa ang Diyos ay pag-ibig

Nang si Kristo'y isilang
May tatlóng haring nagsidalaw
At ang bawat isá ay nagsipaghandóg
Ng tanging alay.

Cebuano:
Bag-ong tuíg, bág-ong kinabúhì.
Dinuyogan sa átong mga pagbati.
Atong awiton ug atong laylayon
Aron magmalípayon.

Kasadya ni'ng Táknaa
Dapit sa kahimayaan.
Mao ray among nakita,
Ang panagway nga masanagon.

Buláhan ug buláhan
Ang tagbaláy nga giawitan.
Awit nga halandumon,
Ug sa tanang pasko magmalípayon.

Christmas Has Arrived (English)

Christmas has come
Come, let us go forth singing
Beautiful hymns
For God is love.

When Christ was born,
There were three kings who did visit,
And each one did present
A unique offering.

Chorus:
'Tis New Year, so we must reform our lives
That joyful might be our Nation;
Let us strive that we might achieve
Prosperity!

Come, let us go forth singing,
Whilst the world is silent
The day has arrived,
Of the Infant sent from heaven.

Let us love one another,
May we follow the Golden Rule,
And from now on-
Though it not be Christmas, let us keep giving.

== "Pasko Na Naman" ==
"Pasko Na Naman" is a Filipino Christmas carol written by lyricist Levi Celerio and composer Felipe Padilla de León. They composed the song in 1965.

== "Kampana ng Simbahan" ==
"Kampana ng Simbahan" is Filipino Christmas song arranged by Ryan Cayabyab and sung by Leo Valdez in 1981, as part of Pamasko ng Mga Bituin album, released by Universal Records (as WEA Records at that time). The song became a TikTok trend in Christmas of 2023.

== Other songs ==
- "Payapang Daigdig" (1946)
- "Noche Buena" (1965), written by composer Felipe Padilla de León and lyricist Levi Celerio
- "Miss Kita Kung Christmas" (lit. 'I Miss You Every Christmas', 1975), written by Hermie Uy and Fe M. Ayala
- "Pasko Sa Puso Ko" (lit. 'Christmas in My Heart', 1978), written by Joey Abando and Baby Gil
- "Pasko Na Sinta Ko" (lit. 'It's Christmas Now My Dear', 1982), written by Francis Dandan and music by Aurelio Estanislao
- "Sa Paskong Darating" (1984), lyrics by Serapio Ramos and Paolo Bustamante and music by Serapio Ramos, Ruben Tagalog and Jun Lacanienta
- "Merry Christmas, Nasaan Ka Man" (lit. 'Merry Christmas, Wherever You Are', 1986), written by Levi Celerio and music by Stephen Michael Schwartz
- "Hele ni Inay" (lit. 'Mother's Lullaby', 1986), written by Lisa Tayko and music by Roy del Valle and Lisa Tayko
- "Kumukutikutitap" (lit. 'Glimmering', 1987), music by Ryan Cayabyab and lyrics by Jose Javier Reyes
- "Heto Na Naman" (lit. 'Here it goes again', 1991), music and lyrics by Ryan Cayabyab
- "Pasko Na!" (lit. 'It's Christmas', 1987), written by Onofre Pagsanghan, Norman Agatep, and Jandi Arboleda and music by Manoling Francisco, SJ
- "Pasko ng Paglaya" (lit. 'Christmas of Liberation', 1987), written by Jandi Arboleda and music by Manoling Francisco, SJ
- "Emmanuel" (1987), written by George Gozum and music by Manoling Francisco, SJ
- "Gumising" (lit. 'Wake Up', 1987), written by Onofre Pagsanghan and music by Manoling Francisco, SJ
- "Himig ng Hangin" (lit. 'Melody of the Wind', 1987), written by Jandi Arboleda and music by Norman Agatep
- "Maligayang Pasko" (lit. 'Merry Christmas', 1987), written by Jandi Arboleda
- "Noong Paskong Una" (lit. 'On the First Christmas', 1987), written by Onofre Pagsanghan and music by Manoling Francisco, SJ
- "Christmas Won't Be The Same Without You" (1988), written by Martin Nievera
- "Narito Na Ang Pasko" (lit. 'Christmas is Already Here', 1988), written by Manoling Francisco, SJ
- "A Perfect Christmas" (1990), written by Jose Mari Chan
- "Christmas in Our Hearts" (1990), written by composer Jose Mari Chan and lyricist Rina Cañiza
- "A Wish on Christmas Night" (1990), written by Jose Mari Chan with additional lyrics by Pinky Valdez
- "Christmas Past" (1990), written by Jose Mari Chan and lyricist Louie Ocampo
- "Pasko Para Sa Lahat" (lit. 'Christmas for All', 1990), written by Vehnee Saturno
- "Parang Hindi Pasko" (1990), written by Aaron Paul Del Rosario
- "Tuloy na Tuloy Pa Rin ang Pasko" (transl. Christmas is Still Very Much Happening", 1991), written by Andrei Dionisio
- "Panuluyan" (lit. 'Lodging', 1992), written by Arnel de Pano
- "Sana Ngayong Pasko" (lit. 'I Hope This Christmas', 1993), written by Jimmy Borja
- "Silent Night Na Naman" (1993), written by Vehnee Saturno
- "Christmas With You" (1993), written by Martin Nievera and music by Mark J. Feist and sung by Pops Fernandez
- "Pasko ang Damdamin" (lit. 'Christmas is the Feeling', 1994), written by Freddie Aguilar
- "Sa Araw ng Pasko" (lit. 'On Christmas Day', 1997), written by Vehnee Saturno
- "Kung Kailan Pasko" (lit. 'When It's Christmas', 1998), written by Vehnee Saturno
- "Ngayong Pasko" (lit. 'This Christmas', 1997), written by Larry Hermoso
- "Noo'y Pasko Rin" (lit. 'It's Also Christmas Back Then', 1997), written by Freddie Saturno and Tito Cayamanda
- "Soon It's Christmas" (1997), written by Jimmy Borja
- "Sa Pasko Sana'y Magbalik" (lit. 'This Christmas, I Hope It Will Return', 1998), written by Freddie Saturno
- "A Christmas Greeting" (1998), written by Larry Hermoso
- "Nasaan Ka sa Pasko" (lit. 'Where are You for Christmas', 1998), written by Wilfred Lopez and music by Edith Gallardo
- "Di Ba't Pasko'y Pag-ibig?" (lit. 'Isn't Christmas Love?', 1999), written by Vehnee Saturno
- "Bituin" (lit. 'Star', 1999), written by Arnel Aquino, SJ
- "Christmas Bonus" (2000), written by Eva Vivar and music by Celso Abenoja
- "Pagsapit ng Pasko" (2001)
- "Bisperas" (lit. 'Christmas Eve', 2002), written by Arnel Aquino, SJ
- "Oyayi" (lit. 'Lullaby', 2002), written by Arnel Aquino, SJ
- "Wala Ka Na Naman... (Sa Pasko)" (2002), written by Babsie Molina and music by Edith Gallardo
- "Where You Are" (2002), written by Julius Guevarra and Mark Lopez and music by Julius Guevarra
- "Kahit Na Abril ay Parang Pasko pa Rin" (lit. 'It's Christmas in April Too', 2002), written by Vincent de Jesus
- "Sanggol Sa Sabsaban" (lit. 'Child in the Manger', 2002), written by Vincent de Jesus
- "Paskong Nagdaan" (lit. 'Last Christmas', 2002), written by Jonathan Florido and music by Rodel Colmenar
- "Pikpiripikpik (Naririnig Mo Ba)" (2002)
- "Isang Pamilya, Isang Puso, Ngayong Pasko/Put a Little Love in Your Heart" (2002)
- "Kapuso, Kayo ang Star ng Aming Pasko!" (2003)
- "Pasko ng Kapuso" (2004), written by Kedy Sanchez, Sarah Manila and Dong Tan
- "Ang Bango ng Pasko" (2005)
- "Boom Tarat Tarat (Pasko Na)" (2006), written by Lito Camo
- "Ang Sarap ng Paskong Kapuso" (2006), music by Cecille Borja
- "Regalo ng Kapuso" (2007), lyrics by Candy Delos Reyes and music by Cecilia Borja
- "Walang Mag-iisa Ngayong Pasko" (lit. 'No One Will be Alone this Christmas', 2007), written by Robert Labayen and music by Jimmy Antiporda
- "Pasko sa Pinas" (2007), written by Yeng Constantino
- "May Katuparan ang Hiling sa Kapamilyang Kapiling" (lit. 'Wishes are Fulfilled in Family Companion', 2008), written by Robert Labayen and music by Fred Ferraz
- "Bro, Ikaw ang Star ng Pasko" (lit. 'Bro, You are the Star of Christmas', 2009), written by Robert Labayen and music by Amber Davis and Marcus Davis Jr.
- "Sama-Sama Tayong Mag-Pasalove Ngayong Pasko" (2009), written by Candy delos Reyes and music by Cecille Borja
- "Your Christmas Girl" (2009), written by Jimmy Borja and sung by Sarah Geronimo
- "Ngayong Pasko, Magniningning ang Pilipino" (lit. 'The Filipino will Shine this Christmas', 2010), written by Lloyd Oliver Corpuz and music by Jordan Constantino
- "Pasko ng Pag-Ibig" (lit. 'Christmas of Love', 2010), written by Lui Morano and music by Norman Agatep
- "Da Best ang Pasko ng Pilipino" (lit. 'Filipino Christmas is the Best', 2011), written by Robert Labayen and music by Jimmy Antiporda
- "Krismas Mas Mas Masaya" (2011)
- "Lumiliwanag ang Mundo sa Kwento ng Pasko" (lit. 'The World Shines in the Story of Christmas', 2012), written by Robert Labayen and music by Amber Davis and Marcus Davis Jr.
- "Disyembre Na Naman" (lit. 'It's December Once Again', 2013), lyrics written by Jamie Rivera and music composed and arranged by Denis Quila
- "Magkasama Tayo sa Kwento ng Pasko" (lit. 'We're Together in the Story of Christmas', 2013), written by Robert Labayen and music by Jumbo de Belen
- "Everyday is Christmas Day" (2013), written by Jazz Nicolas
- "Share the Love" (2014), written by Brian James Camaya and music by Arlene Calvo
- "Thank You Ang Babait Ninyo" (2014), written by Robert Labayen, Love Rose de Leon, and Lloyd Oliver Corpuz and music by Amber Davis and Marcus Davis Jr.
- "Ikaw Na" (2014), music and lyrics by Dindo Purto, SSP
- "MaGMAhalan Tayo Ngayong Pasko" (2015), written by Brian James Camaya and Clare Yee and music by Simon Peter Tan and sung by Alden Richards
- "Thank You For The Love" (2015), written by Robert Labayen and music by Thyro Alfaro and Yumi Lacsamana
- "Nakakamiss ang Pasko" (2015), written by Cl. Dindo Purto, SSP and music by Clottie Gealogo and Dindo Purto, SSP
- "Happy Happy Kidsmas" (2015)
- "Bibingka" (2016), written by Miguel Benjamin Guico and Paulo Benjamin Guico
- "Isang Pamilya Tayo Ngayong Pasko" (lit. 'We're One Family this Christmas' 2016), written by Robert Labayen and music by Thyro Alfaro and Yumi Lacsamana
- "Magic ng Pasko" (lit. 'Magic of Christmas', 2016), written by Brian James Camaya and Nicolle Castillo and music by Ann Margaret Figueroa
- "Himig Ngayong Pasko" (2016), lyrics by Paul Vincent Octubre, SSP and Olvier Vergel Par, SSP and music by Paul Vincent Octubre, SSP
- "MaGMAhalan Nang Buong Puso" (2017), written by Brian James Camaya, Jolly Conopio and Jann Fayel Lopez and music by Arlene Calvo
- "Just Love Ngayong Christmas" (2017), written by Robert Labayen, Lloyd Oliver Corpuz, and Christian Faustino, and music by Jimmy Antiporda
- "Merry ang Pasko" (2017), written by Christian Martinez and sung by Maymay Entrata
- "Mas Liligaya Ang Pasko" (2017), written and music by Bassilyo, Smugglaz and Coco Martin
- "Family is Love" (2018), written by Robert Labayen and Lloyd Oliver Corpuz and music by Amber Davis and Marcus Davis Jr.
- "Puso ng Pasko" (2018), written by Brian James Camaya and Rexy Jolly Conopio and music by Ann Margaret Figueroa
- "Make Christmas Everyday" (2018), words and music by Cl. Paul Vincent Octubre, SSP, Cl. Anthony John Javier, SSP and Fr. Albert Garong, SSP
- "Family is Forever" (2019), written by Robert Labayen, Lloyd Oliver Corpuz, and Thyro Alfaro, and music by Thyro Alfaro and Lloyd Oliver Corpuz
- "Love Shines" (2019), written by Brian James Camaya, Rexy Jolly Conopio, and Jann Fayel Lopez, and music by Natasha Correos
- "Kay Sayang Pasko Na Naman" (2019), written by Jonathan Manalo and John Edixon Michael
- "Merry ang Pasko sa Kaibigan Mo" (2019), written and mixed by Anthon Juarez
- "Ngayong Pasko, #FlexTheKindness" (2019), written by Eugene Calimag and Jeffrey Ray Miguel
- "Awit ng Bagong Taon" (lit. 'Song of the New Year', 2019)
- "Tayo Na!" (lit. 'Let's Do It!', 2019), lyrics and music by Dindo Purto, SSP
- "Pasko ng Paghilom" (2019), composed and arranged by Rev. Fr. Rico John Bilangel, C.Ss.R.
- "Yakapin Ang Pasko" (lit. 'Embrace Christmas', 2020), written by Bernadette Sembrano-Aguinaldo
- "Tuloy Pa Rin ang Pasko" (lit. 'Christmas Still Happens', 2020), written by Noel Ferrer and music by Louie Ocampo
- "Ikaw ang Liwanag at Ligaya" (lit. 'You're the Light and Joy', 2020), written by Robert Labayen and Love Rose De Leon and music by Thyro Alfaro
- "Isang Puso Ngayong Pasko" (2020), written by Rexy Jolly Conopio and music by Natasha Correos
- "Akap ng Emmanuel" (2020), written by AJ Javier, SSP and Albert Garong, SSP and music by AJ Javier, SSP and Ronel Soriano, SSP
- "Gawing Pandemya ang Pasko" (2020)
- "Pasko ng mga Pinoy" (2021), written by Ogie Alcasid
- "Andito Tayo Para Sa Isa't Isa" (lit. 'We're Here for One Another', 2021), written by Love Rose De Leon, Robert Labayen, and Thyro Alfaro, and music by Thyro Alfaro and Xeric Tan
- "Love Together, Hope Together" (2021), written by Brian James Camaya, Emman Rivera, and Jann Fayel Lopez, and music by Simon Peter Tan
- "Atin Ang Paskong Ito, Kapatid!" (lit. 'This Christmas is Ours, Brothers and Sisters!', 2021), written by Rey Valera, Peter Edward Dizon, Ivy David and Mandarhyme and music by Elhmir Saison
- "Makakarating Ngayong Pasko" (2021), written by Jan Aldrin Belisario
- "Parating Na ang Pasko" (2021), written by Minnith Mota with additional words by Joey de Leon
- "Tanglaw" (2021), written by Fr. Albert Garong, SSP and Cl. Anthony John Javier, SSP
- "Love is Us This Christmas" (2022), written by Emman Rivera and Jann Fayel Lopez and music by Ann Margaret Figueroa
- "Tayo ang Ligaya ng Isa't Isa" (lit. 'We're the Joy of One Another', 2022), written by Robert Labayen and music by Jonathan Manalo
- "Sama-Samang Ihatid ang Ibang Saya ng Pasko" (2022), written by Dia Directo-Pulido and music by Jumbo de Belen and John Michael Conchada
- "Kwento ng Pasko, Kwento ng Pag-ibig" (2022), written by Cl. Russel Matthew Patolot, SSP
- "Sa Kanyang Pag-ibig" (2022), written by Zol Patanao
- "Meet Me for Noche Buena" (2022), composed by Saunder Choi, lyrics by Aileen Cassinetto
- "Feeling Blessed Ngayong Pasko" (2023), written by BJ Camaya, Maria Aranza Peralta and Lorraine Intes and music by Rina Mercado
- "Pasko sa Piling Mo" (2023), written by Trina Belamide
- "Feel na Feel Ang Paskong Kapatid" (2023), written by Isaac Jason Usi and music by Thyro Alfaro and Jungee Marcelo
- "Hiling sa Pasko" (lit. 'Wish this Christmas', 2023), written by Vehnee Saturno
- "Pasko ang Pinakamagandang Kwento" (lit. 'Christmas is the Best Story', 2023), lyrics by Robert Labayen and Lawrence Arvin Sibug and music by Kiko Salazar and Jonathan Manalo
- "Sa Belen Tayo Uuwi" (2023), written by CI Russel Patolot, SSP
- "Christmas: Courageous Hope" (2023), written and music by Rev. Fr. Rico John Bilangel, C.Ss.R.
- "Merry Christmas 2 U" (2024), written by Kaye Cantong and music by Rey Cantong
- "Ang Tanging Regalo" (2024), composed by Sean Pabico, Max Antonio, and Kirstie Garcia
- "Sa Pasko Sasapit Din" (2024), written by Ali Figueroa and music by Norman Agatep
- "Ganito ang Paskong Pinoy: Puno ng Pasasalamat" (2024), written by Christine Autor, Natasha Correos, Joe-Edrei Cruz, Ann Margaret Figueroa, Lorraine Intes, and Samantha Toloza, with music by Natasha Correos, Joe-Edrei Cruz, and Ann Margaret Figueroa
- "Hatid-Saya Ang Paskong Kapatid" (2024), written by Lory Alba, Katrina Lagman and Dia Directo-Pulido and music by Jungee Marcelo
- "Paskong Pinoy: It’s Giving!" (2024), composed by Darl Alba and Isabela Buenviaje-Mendez
- "Our Stories Shine This Christmas" (2024), written by Robert Labayen, Des Parawan, Lawrence Arvin Sibug, Love Rose de Leon, Revbrain Martin and music and overall production by Jonathan Manalo
- "Love, Joy, Hope: Sabay Tayo Ngayong Pasko" (2025), written by Robert Labayen, with additional lyrics by Jay Dustin Santiago, inspired by Ricardo Cadavero, Melanie Figueroa, Perlita Guerrero, Fr. Errol Fidel Mananquil, Martin Riggs, and Richmond Seladores. Music, arrangement, and production were by Raizo Chabeldin and Biv De Vera (Original "Sabay Tayo" theme by Jessie Lasaten)
- "Walang Patid Ang Paskong Kapatid" ("Christmas is Endless, Brother") (2025), music by Vehnee Saturno, lyrics by Vehnee Saturno, Lory Alba, Kath Lagman, Dia Directo-Pulido and Isaac Usi and sung by Maxie Andreison, Elijah Canlas, Dylan Menor, Ana Ramsey, Joao Constancia, Queenay Mercado, Paulo Angeles, Ryle Santiago, Kych Minemoto, Niko Badayos, Ashtine Olviga, Krissha Viaje, Gianna Huelgas, Kit Inciong, Anasity Jardaleza, Kaitlyn King, Carmela Lorzano, Marimar Tua, Adrian Adesas, Miggy Raña, Kurt Desso, Cody Escalona, Jeypi Funtanar, Anton Posadas, Anjo Samate, Tim Tuppil
- "Pasko Sa Pilipinas (Merry Christmas to the World)" (2026), written and produced by DJ Clauz

== See also ==
- List of Christmas carols
