= The Forbidden Woman =

The Forbidden Woman refers to the following films:

- The Forbidden Woman (1920 film), American silent film
- The Forbidden Woman (1927 film), American silent film

== See also ==
- Forbidden Women (disambiguation)
