= Forbidden Women (1948 film) =

- Tictaban l'isola dell'amore proibito
- Directed by: Eduardo de Castro
- Produced by: Lloyd Friedgen
- Starring: Fernando Poe; Mona Lisa
- Cinematography: Steve Perez
- Edited by: Lloyd Friedgen
- Music by: Josefino Cenizal; Apolinar Rojas
- Release date: 1948
- Running time: 62 minutes
- Country: Philippines
- Language: English

Forbidden Women, also known as Tictaban l'isola dell'amore proibito, is a 1948 Philippine adventure film directed by Eduardo de Castro. It stars Fernando Poe, Berting Labra, Mona Lisa.

== Plot ==
Prince Singor returns to his island homeland after completing his education in the United States. Upon his arrival, he becomes involved in a conflict over succession and political power within the Sultan's court. As rival factions compete for influence, Singor must navigate intrigue, loyalty, and personal relationships while confronting those seeking control of the kingdom.

== Cast ==
- Fernando Poe as Prince Singor
- Berting Labra as The Sultan
- Mona Lisa as Princess Apamena
- Fernando Royo
- Luningning
- Bimbo Danao

== Reception ==
DVD Talk said, "the film was shot entirely in English, though one assumes that many in the cast were primarily Tagalog speakers, as the performances are uniformly terrible. The sets are elaborate but cheaply-made and the action crudely realized."

== See also ==
- South Seas genre
