= Onofre R. Pagsanghan =

- Born: Onofre R. Pagsanghan; June 12, 1927 (age 98); Tondo, Manila, Philippine Islands
- Other name: Mr. Pagsi
- Occupation: Teacher
- Known for: Teaching and theater work

Onofre R. Pagsanghan (born June 12, 1927) is a teacher, playwright, and stage director from the Ateneo de Manila High School, Philippines. An Ateneo alumnus himself, Mr. Pagsi—as he is fondly called by students and colleagues—began his teaching career in his alma mater in 1951. He taught Latin, English, and Filipino to high school students over several decades. In addition, he is also the moderator of the theater group Dulaang Sibol, which he founded in 1956. Before he officially retired in 2020, he received numerous awards in the fields of teaching and theater.

== Early life ==
Pagsanghan was born in Tondo, Manila, on June 12, 1927, to parents Hipolito Pagsanghan and Vicenta Rivera. Raised in poverty, Pagsanghan was able to study in Ateneo through a scholarship. Through the president of Ateneo, who was a friend of their parish priest, he was able to get a 50% discount. It was a big help, but he still could not afford the remainder, so the priest handled the other 50% (based on an interview with him). Unfortunately, his schooling was halted due to the invasion of the Japanese. Classes eventually resumed in 1945 and he was able to graduate high school in 1947. He earned an AB in education in 1951, and an MA in English in 1984. He married Florinda Duran in 1960 and they had three children, namely Stella, Joel, and Sylvia, who is also teaching in Ateneo High School.

== Teaching and theater career ==
Pagsanghan decided to become a teacher after graduation. He was inspired to take this vocation by his own high school teacher, Fr. John Delaney, S.J. Fr. Delaney asked him to become a teacher during his high school days, and Pagsanghan took up the challenge in 1951, after graduating college. He applied to be a teacher in Ateneo High School. However, the principal back then, an American Jesuit, was unsure if he could last as a teacher because of his frail and weak structure. The principal eventually accepted him, under the condition that during lunch breaks, he would sleep in one of the unused rooms in order to gain his strength. Pagsanghan agreed, and began teaching English and Filipino to freshmen high school students. He chose to teach in first year high school because this was the time children could be molded the most, and he wanted to influence and change his students in the right way

He was able to write several books, which were integrated into the curriculum of several schools. “Hasik”, “Layag” and “Makabagong Pilipino” are three of those books that are now used in different high schools. Two of his other books, “Reaching Out” and “Sagwan”, are still being used by the Ateneo High School.

Pagsanghan began teaching theater in 1956. He founded the Ateneo High School Dramatics Society, which was later renamed Dulaang Sibol in 1966. Under his guidance, numerous critically acclaimed plays were staged, such as “Doon Po sa Amin”, “Ang Paglilitis ni Mang Serapio” and “Sinta!”; all of which he translated from their English counterpart and adapted to the Philippine context. The group became nationally renowned for its polished and professional presentations.

Throughout the years, Pagsanghan gained numerous awards for his work in education and theater. In 1970, he was awarded the Gawad Balagtas Award and the Patnubay ng Kalinangan award for his theater work. In addition, “Sinta” bagged the award for the Best Musical Film in the 1977 FAMAS. In honor of his 45th year of teaching, the Dulaang Sibol Theater was renamed to the Tanghalan Onofre R. Pagsanghan by Ateneo. In 1985, he received the first Metrobank Outstanding Educator Award, one of the most prestigious awards that can be given to a teacher. In 2003, he was awarded the Bayaning Gurong Pilipino Award by the ABS-CBN Foundation.

== Teaching style ==
From 1980 onwards, Pagsanghan became the moderator of class 1-A, the honors class of first year. In teaching, he combines theater and music into literary works such as “Julius Caesar” and “The Little Prince.” He makes sure to use the entire classroom while acting out certain portions of readings to catch attention. Songs are also incorporated into lessons, usually used when introducing a new one. In tests, which are always written on manila paper, he focuses on “why” questions since he considers understanding why something is such as the most important part of learning. In addition, religion and morality are always applied.

Quotes and memorable passages are also important in his style. Students are pushed to memorize and understand quotes in order to get a better understanding of texts. He also has weekly memorable passages, which are posted at the front of the blackboard. Quotes can range from famous lines from book to famous sayings from historical figures.

== Present life ==
Pagsanghan currently is still a member of the Ateneo de Manila High School Faculty but is no longer teaching. He instead shares and gives reflections to all the classes of the High School and serves as a formator for the young men and women of the High School.

He is the founder and was the moderator of Dulaang Sibol until 2017. However, he is not the moderator of the organization currently.

He gives lectures all throughout the Philippines with topics ranging from the devotion of teaching to stage plays. Despite being more than 20 years over the retirement age, he has no plans of retiring, and has stated that he will continue to teach until he no longer has the ability to do so.

== Teaching awards ==
- Order of St. Michael the Archangel by the Holy Angel University (2011)
- Bayaning Gurong Pilipino Award from the ABS-CBN Foundation and UGAT (2003)
- Gawad Paz Marquez Benitez for outstanding educator in literature from Unyon ng mga Manunulat sa Pilipinas (2002)
- The Outstanding Filipino Award by the Junior Chamber International (JCI) Senate Philippines (1996)
- Metrobank Outstanding Educators Award for excellence as a high school teacher (1985, the first year of the Metrobank Awards)
- E.A.G.L.E. Fund Teacher Award for excellence in the teaching profession from the Ateneo de Manila University (every year from its inception in 1980 up to the present)
- First Irwin Memorial Award for excellence in the teaching profession from the Ateneo de Manila University (1977)
- Ozanam Award for Outstanding Service as a Catholic teacher from the Ateneo de Manila University (1970)
- Citizens’ Award for Television, Best Educational Television Program, for a televised series of lessons in Filipino (1964)

== Cultural awards ==
- "Yes The Filipino Can!" award by the RFM Corp. (2008)
- Centennial Honors for the Arts (Theater) from the National Centennial Commission (1999)
- Gawad Manuel L. Quezon from Quezon City and the Taliba ng Inang Wika (1996)
- Gawad CCP para sa Sining (Dulaan) from the Cultural Center of the Philippines (1992)
- Gawad Pambansang Alagad ni Balagtas from Unyon ng mga Manunulat sa Pilipinas (1992)
- FAMAS Best Musical Film Award for Sinta (1976)
- Patnubay ng Kalinangan Award for national contribution in the field of theater from the City of Manila (1970)
- Gawad Balagtas for significant work in Philippine theater from the Surian ng Wikang Pambansa in (1970)
