= Noche Buena (song) =

Song
- Language: Tagalog
- Published: 1965
- Genre: Christmas
- Composer: Felipe Padilla de León
- Lyricist: Levi Celerio

"Noche Buena" is a Tagalog-language Christmas song written by composer Felipe Padilla de León and lyricist Levi Celerio in 1965. As a Christmas standard, it has been recorded by numerous Filipino artists since its publication.

== Recordings ==
- Esso Philippines Choral Group, for the 1972 album Pasko sa Pilipinas
- Didith Reyes, for the 1977 album Merry Christmas
- Marco Sison, for the 1981 album Pamasko ng Mga Bituin
- Celeste Legaspi, for the 1984 album Plakang Pamasko ni Celeste Legaspi
- Joey Albert, for the 1987 album Maligayang Pasko (lit. 'Merry Christmas')
- Ryan Cayabyab, for the 1991 album One Christmas
- Dyna Ensemble, for the 1994 album Pasko Na Namang Muli
- San Miguel Philharmonic Orchestra and the San Miguel Master Chorale, arranged by Ryan Cayabyab for the 2005 album Pasko I
- The Company, for the 2006 album The Christmas Album

== See also ==
- List of Filipino Christmas carols
