= Levi Celerio =

Filipino composer and lyricist

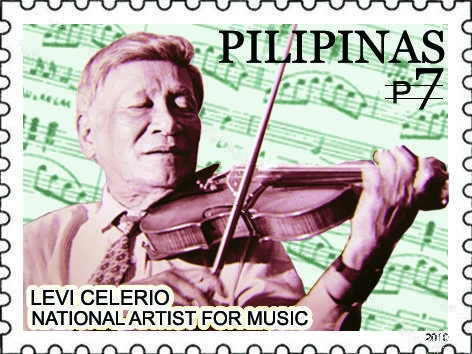
- Born: April 30, 1910; Tondo, Manila, Philippine Islands
- Died: April 2, 2002 (aged 91); Quezon City, Philippines
- Resting place: Libingan ng mga Bayani, Taguig
- Awards: Order of National Artists of the Philippines

Levi Celerio (April 30, 1910 – April 2, 2002) was a Filipino composer and lyricist who is credited with writing over 4,000 songs. Celerio was recognized as a National Artist of the Philippines for Music and Literature in 1997.

He is also known for using the leaf as a musical instrument which led to being recognized as the "only man who could play music using a leaf" by the Guinness Book of Records. This led to him making guest appearances on television shows recorded outside the Philippines.

Aside from being a musician, Celerio was also a poet and a film actor who appeared in various Philippine films of the 1950s and 1960s.

== Early life and education ==
Levi Celerio was born on April 30, 1910, in Tondo, Philippines to Cornelio Cruz and Juliana Celerio and was born to a poor family. Celerio's affinity for music was a result of influence from his mother who is a harpist and a member of a church choir. He was estranged from his father who was involved in real estate and jewelry business. His father was never married to his mother.

His mother encouraged him to be involved in music as a distraction from the squalid conditions of their neighborhood. Despite this, Celerio became a close acquaintance of gang leader Asiong Salonga. At his mother's encouragement, Celerio started playing the violin at age 11 taking lessons from a member of the Philippine Constabulary Band. Celerio later performed with the band as its member while simultaneously attending Torres High School. It was during his high school years that Celerio learned about his father.

He also attended the Academy of Music Manila Conservatory of Music to study violin for two semesters. Then director Alexander Lippay recommended him for a scholarship at the Academy of Music in Manila. He received a scholarship and became the youngest member of the Manila Symphony Orchestra.

== Career ==
=== Orchestral and poetry career ===
Levi Celerio was a member of the Manila Symphony Orchestra but his stint with the musical troupe ended when he fell off a tree and broke his wrist. He temporarily worked as a comic illustrator and later decided to shift to songwriting.

Prior to turning to songwriting, Celerio got involved in poetry and was a humorist in the orchestra of Premiere Productions. He held high regard to the poet, Jose Corazon de Jesus. However, his poems failed to gain positive reception and his works were regarded as "lacking in style". Later in his career, he had Filipino Palindromes and Take It From Levi, a collection of love poems he wrote published.

=== Songwriting ===
Levi Celerio is credited for writing more than 4,000 songs, many of which are dedicated to his wife and children. He wrote Filipino folk, Christmas, and love songs and some of his songs were used in feature films.

Among Original Pilipino Music (OPM) songs he composed are "Ikaw", "Kahit Konting Pagtingin", "Saan Ka Man Naroroon? (1968)". He wrote the lyrics of the Filipino lullaby "Sa Ugoy ng Duyan". He also composed folk songs including "Ako ay May Singsing", "Ang Pipit", "Dungawin Mo Hirang", "Itik-Itik", "Pitong Gatang", and "Waray-Waray" "Sa Ugoy ng Duyan", in particular, was a collaboration with Lucio San Pedro, a fellow National Artist.

"Ang Pasko ay Sumapit", officially titled "Maligayang Pasko at Masaganang Bagong Taon" is an example of a well-known Christmas song by Celerio, which was the Tagalog version from the original Cebuano song, Kasadya Ning Taknaa, by Vicente Rubi and Mariano Vestil. He also wrote the Christmas carols "Pasko Na Naman" and "Noche Buena" with composer Felipe Padilla de León in 1965.

=== Awards and recognition ===
==== National Artist for Music and Literature ====
On October 9, 1997, pursuant to Proclamation No. 1114, President Fidel V. Ramos proclaimed him a National Artist for Music and Literature. His citation read that his music "was a perfect embodiment of the heartfelt sentiments and valued traditions of the Filipino".

==== Guinness recognition ====
Celerio was known for using the leaf as a musical instrument which resulted in the Guinness Book of World Records to recognize him as "the man who could play music with a leaf". According to his daughter, he first learned to play the leaf as an instrument during World War II. According to the account, he had to prove himself as a musician when he had an encounter with Japanese soldiers. He managed to pick a young leaf and play them a song and he was left unscathed.

==== Other honors and awards ====
The University of the Philippines conferred him an honorary doctorate degree in humanities in 1991. The Film Academy of the Philippines gave Celerio the Lifetime Achievement Award in 1989. He is also the recipient of the CCP Gawad Para Sa Sining in 1991, and the Gawad Urian Award in 1993.

=== Movie & television appearances ===
In the 1950s and the 1960s, Celerio was involved in various Philippine film as a character actor. He portrayed a variety of roles which ranged from a beggar, a rapist, a liquor thief and pickpocket, and a palm-reader. His Guinness recognition led to his guest appearance in The Ed Sullivan Show He also guested in The Merv Griffin Show and That's Incredible! (1970s).

== Later years ==
In his old age, Celerio occasionally appeared in public, usually at a concert at the Cultural Center of the Philippines. He also played violin at the Camelot Hotel bar and other small venues.

== Death and legacy ==
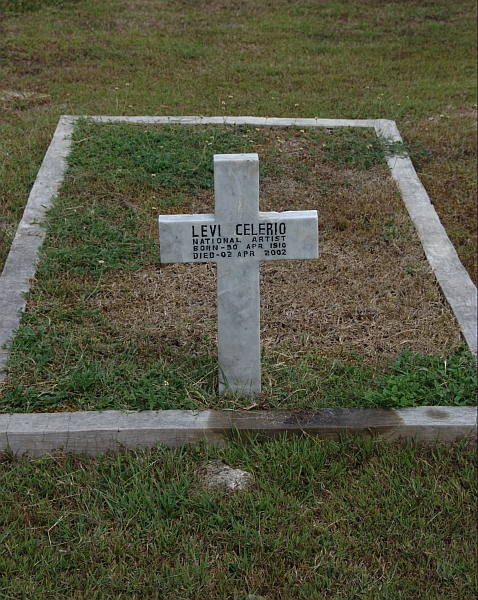
Levi Celerio's grave at the Libingan ng mga Bayani in Taguig

Celerio died in the afternoon of April 2, 2002, at the Delgado Clinic in Kamuning, Quezon City due to multiple organ dysfunction. He also had a prior episode of stroke. He was buried with full military honors at the Libingan ng mga Bayani.

On his 108th Birth Anniversary on April 30, 2018, Google Philippines featured Celerio in a Google Doodle.

== Personal life ==
Levi Celerio was married to Lina Celerio and has 4 children. He had four failed relationships. Singer-comedian Veronica Palileo is a half-sister of his and director-actor Tony Cruz was a half-brother. He also played the piano as a past time but not in a professional capacity.

== Filmography ==
Year	Title	Credited as		Role	Note(s)	Ref(s).
Year	Title	Composer	Actor	Role	Note(s)	Ref(s).
1959	Pitong Gatang	No	Yes			
1960	Bigay Hilig	Yes	Yes			
1962	Markang Rehas	No	Yes			
1963	Ang Babaeng Isputnik	No	Yes			
1963	Istambay	Yes	No			
1963	Miting de Avance	No	Yes			
1966	Franco Maderro	Yes	No			
1966	Mr. Humble Boy (Ang Dating Kampeon)	Yes	No			
1968	The Son of Vera Cruz	Yes	Yes			
1973	Hanggang sa Kabila ng Daigdig	No	Yes			
1977	Wanakosey	No	Yes			
1992	Mahirap Maging Pogi	No	Yes	A "lolo"		
1997	Adarna: The Mythical Bird	Yes	No			

== In popular culture ==
- Portrayed by Ariel Rivera in an episode of Maalaala Mo Kaya titled Byulin.
