= Kasadya Ning Taknaa =

Cebuano Christmas carol

Kasadya Ning Taknaa (English: How Blissful is this Season, lit. 'Happy is this Hour') is a Cebuano Christmas carol composed in 1933 by Vicente Rubi with lyrics by Mariano Vestil. Its famous counterpart is Ang Pasko Ay Sumapit, a modified version of the song written by Levi Celerio with lyrics in Tagalog (but not as a translation of the original); however, Celerio is often given all songwriting credit without any acknowledgment of Rubi and Vestil.

== Background ==
Rubi is best known for composing the Kasadya Ning Taknaa. The Rubi family used to reside in a house along what is now known as Paulino Gullas Street in Cebu City, where a festival was held nearby in Pili-Kanipaan (now Manalili Street) every December. According to columnist Juan L. Mercado, the song was composed after officials of the Cebu Christmas festival asked him to join the daygon (carol) songwriting contest, and the said composition won.

Another account claimed that the song was composed by the request of Cebuano playwright Rafael Policarpio who needed it to be played during a caroling scene in one of his plays. After the curtains drew to a close when the play was staged in Lapu-lapu City, the song quickly became popular. It was a hit in Leyte, Negros, Bohol, and other Cebuano-speaking provinces and had become part of the classic repertoire of Cebuano yuletide songs ever since.

== Royalties ==
The Mareco Recording Company in Manila bought the song in 1950 and compensated him ₱50 as advance royalty and additional three cents for each sold record. However, he was only given 110.25 of the ₱1,994.63 collectible in 1967 and the company's financial reports showed that his composition sold 62,812 records during the period between 1966 and 1975. In 1976, with the help of his lawyer Napoleon Rama, he filed a lawsuit to claim the unpaid royalties in Quezon City, but it was dismissed two months later because of his inability to travel due to lack of funds. The company also claimed that checks were made in his name; however, they were not delivered because he moved to different addresses with his wife twice as he avoided staying with his children who had started their own families. Three years later, he filed a suit before the court of Judge Hernando Salas in Cebu together with his counsel, Ramon Ceniza, who also requested that Rubi be exempted from paying court fees due to his poverty.

He also pursued to be granted copyright on the song before the National Library. His petition was declined by virtue of the passage of the intellectual property law covered by Presidential Decree No. 49.

== Ang Pasko ay Sumapit ==
As early as 1990, Rama criticized the consideration of the Tagalog version, Ang Pasko Ay Sumapit, as an original composition and the absence of credit to Rubi and Vestil. Actress Chai Fonacier and Kultura Bisaya Foundation Ivar Tulfo Gica also criticized the lack of attribution. Mercado wrote in the Philippine Daily Inquirer that described Ang Pasko Ay Sumapit as the hijacked Tagalog version of Kasadya Ning Taknaa.

An article by Esquire magazine drew controversy when it traced the provenance of Ang Pasko ay Sumapit to Celerio. It published a new piece, indicating the competing claims of Rubi, Celerio, and Cenizal with Rubi credited to have composed the song in 1933, Cenizal creating a marching song similar to its tune in 1937, and Celerio coming up with the Tagalog lyrics.

== Lyrics ==
Kasadya ning Taknaa (Cebuano)

Pasiuna
Kasadya ning taknaa
Dapit sa kahimayaan
Mao ray among nakita
Ang panagway nga masanagon
Bulahan ug bulahan
Ang tagbalay nga gi-awitan
Awit nga halandumon sa tanang Pasko
Magmalipayon!

Koro
Bag-ong tuig
Bag-ong kinabuhi
Duyog sa among mga pagbati
Atong awiton ug atong laylayon
aron magmalipayon

Koro
Pasiuna
Pagtapos
Awit nga halangdumon sa tanang Pasko
Magmalipayon!

How Blissful is this Season (English)

Preface
Oh, happy is this hour!
In this place nearest to the Holy
Where all that we witness
Are faces brightened up and jolly.
Blessed indeed, how blessed
Are the houses serenaded
With songs of noble sound and word, and every Christmas day
Will be full of bliss!

Chorus:
With the New Year
Is a new life to live!
Together with all our wishes and hopes,
Come let us sing them, oh come let us hum them
to fill our hearts with bliss

Chorus
Preface
Coda
With songs of noble sound and word, and every Christmas day
Will be full of bliss!
