= List of loanwords in the Tagalog language =

The Tagalog language, encompassing its diverse dialects, and serving as the basis of Filipino — has developed rich and distinctive vocabulary deeply rooted in its Austronesian heritage. Over time, it has incorporated a wide array of loanwords from several foreign languages, including Malay, Hokkien, Spanish, Nahuatl, English, Sanskrit, Tamil, Japanese, Arabic, Persian, and Quechua, among others. This reflects both of its historical evolution and its adaptability in multicultural, multi-ethnic, and multilingual settings. Moreover, the Tagalog language system, particularly through prescriptive language planning, has drawn from various other languages spoken in the Philippines, including major regional languages, further enriching its lexicon.

== Spanish ==
The Filipino language incorporated Spanish loanwords as a result of 333 years of contact with the Spanish language. In their analysis of José Villa Panganiban's Talahuluganang Pilipino-Ingles (Pilipino-English dictionary), Llamzon and Thorpe (1972) pointed out that 33% of word root entries are of Spanish origin. As not all words are used with the same frequency in daily conversation, a pair of studies were conducted by Antonio Quilis to understand the percentage of Spanish-derived words used by Filipinos in their daily conversations; Quilis found that Spanish was the origin of 20.4% of the Tagalog lexicon and 20.5% of the Cebuano lexicon, publishing his findings for each language in 1973 and 1976, respectively. According to Patrick O. Steinkrüger, depending on the text type, around 20% of the vocabulary in a Tagalog text are of Spanish origin. In an analysis of a Tagalog-language corpus consisting of random news, fiction and non-fiction articles published between 2005 and 2015, Ekaterina Baklanova found that Spanish-derived words constitute 20% of the lexicon used. An example is the sentence below in which Spanish–derived words are in italics (original in parentheses):

Tagalog: "Puwede (Puede) ba akóng umupô sa silya (silla) sa tabí ng bintanà (ventana) hábang nása biyahe (viaje) táyo sa eroplano (aeroplano)?"
Translation in English: ("May I sit on the chair near the window during our voyage in the aeroplane?")

The adoption of the Abakada alphabet in 1940 changed the spelling of the Spanish loanwords present in the Filipino language. The spellings of Spanish loanwords were reformed according to the new orthographic rules. Examples include:

agila (from Sp. águila), alkalde (from Sp. alcalde), bakuna (from Sp. vacuna), banyo (from Sp. baño), baso (from Sp. vaso), biktima (from Sp. víctima), bintanà (from Sp. ventana), bisita (from Sp. visita), biyahe (from Sp. viaje), braso (from Sp. brazo), demokrasya (from Sp. democracia), diyaryo (from Sp. diario), estudyante (from Sp. estudiante), henerál (from Sp. general), hustisya (from Sp. justicia), kama (from Sp. cama), kambiyo (from Sp. cambio de marcha), keso (from Sp. queso), kutsara (from Sp. cuchara), kuwarto (from Sp. cuarto), kuwento (from Sp. cuento), lababo (from Sp. lavabo), mensahe (from Sp. mensaje), meryenda (from Sp. merienda), mikrobyo (from Sp. microbio), niyebe (from Sp. nieve), panyô (from Sp. paño), pila (from Sp. fila), plema (from Sp. flema), presyo (from Sp. precio), prinsesa (from Sp. princesa), reseta (from Sp. receta médica), reyna (from Sp. reina), serbisyo (from Sp. servicio), sinturón (from Sp. cinturón), teklado (from Sp. teclado), telebisyón (from Sp. televisión), tinidór (from Sp. tenedor), trabaho (from Sp. trabajo), tuwalya (from Sp. toalla) and yelo (from Sp. hielo).

Other loanwords underwent phonological changes. Vowel changes can be observed to some of the Spanish words upon adoption into the Filipino language, such as an /i/ to /a/ vowel shift observed in the Filipino word pamintá, which came from the Spanish word pimienta, and a pre-nasal /e/ to /u/ vowel shift observed in several words such as unanò (from Sp. enano) and umpisá (from Sp. empezar). Prothetic /a/ is added in the loanwords alisto (from Sp. listo) and aplaya (from Sp. playa). Other words underwent vowel deletion, e.g., pustá (from Sp. apostar), tarantado (from Sp. atarantado), kursonada (from Sp. corazonada), Paskó (from Sp. Pascua) and labì (from Sp. labio).

Consonant shifts can also be observed to some of the Spanish words upon their adoption into the Filipino language. The [r] to [l] consonant shift can be observed in the following words:

albularyo (folk healer, from Sp. herbolario), alma (from Sp. armar), almusál (from Sp. almorzar), asukal (from Sp. azúcar), balbás (from Sp. barba), bandilà (from. Sp. bandera), dasál (from Sp. rezar), hiblá (thread or strand, from Sp. hebra), hilo (dizzy, from Sp. giro), hulmá (to mould, from Sp. ahormar), kasál (from Sp. casar), kumpisál (from Sp. confesar), lagadera (from Sp. regadera), litratista (photographer, from Sp. retratista), litrato (photograph, portrait or picture; from Sp. retrato), multo (from Sp. muerto), nunál (from Sp. lunar), pastól (from Sp. pastor) and pasyál (from Sp. pasear).

The loss of the /l/ phoneme can be observed in the Filipino word kutsón derived from the Spanish colchón. The loss of the /t/ phoneme can be observed in the Filipino words talino (intelligence or wisdom, from Sp. talento) and tina (dye, from Sp. tinta). Some Spanish-derived words have also undergone consonant or syllable deletion upon introduction to Tagalog like in the case of limós (from Sp. limosna), masyado (from Sp. demasiado), posas (from Sp. esposas), restawran (from Sp. restaurante), riles (rail, railway or railroad; from Sp. carriles), sigurado (from asegurado), sindí (from Sp. encender) and sintunado (from Sp. desentonado).

The Spanish digraph [ll] is pronounced by the Spaniards as /j/ during the Renaissance era and this reflected on the pronunciation and the spelling of Spanish-derived loanwords in Tagalog introduced before the 19th century, where the digraph [ll] becomes [y] in Tagalog. Such is the case of the words baryá (from Sp. barrilla), kabayò (from Sp. caballo), kutamaya (from. Sp. cota de malla), lauya (a stew of meat and vegetables, from Sp. la olla), sibuyas (from Sp. cebollas) and tabliya or tablea (from Sp. tablilla de chocolate). Spanish loanwords in which the digraph [ll] is pronounced as /lj/ in Tagalog might have been introduced (or reintroduced) during the 19th century. Examples include apelyido (from Sp. apellido), balyena (from Sp. ballena), kalye (from Sp. calle), kutsilyo (from Sp. cuchillo), makinilya (from Sp. maquinilla de escribir), sepilyo (from Sp. cepillo de dientes), silya (from Sp. silla) and sigarilyo (from Sp. cigarrillo). There are also rare cases of Tagalog doublets coming from the same Spanish etymological root which exhibit both the influences of the Renaissance /j/ and the latter /λ/ sounds, like in the case of the Tagalog word pair laryo and ladrilyo, both from Sp. ladrillo. There are also instances of the Spanish digraph [ll] being transformed into [l] upon adoption by Tagalog. Such is the case in kulani (lymph node, from Sp. collarín).

Vestigial influences of Middle Spanish voiceless palato-alveolar fricative /ʃ/ are evident in some of the Spanish-derived loanwords in Tagalog, where the /ʃ/ sound is transformed into the Tagalog /s/. Examples include relos (clock or wristwatch, from Sp. reloj, pronounced as /reˈloʃ/ in Middle Spanish), sabón (soap, from Sp. jabón, pronounced as /ʃaˈbon/ in Middle Spanish), saro (pitcher or jug, from Sp. jarro, pronounced as /ˈʃaro/ in Middle Spanish), sugál (to gamble, from Sp. jugar, pronounced as /ʃuˈgar/ in Middle Spanish) and tasá (to sharpen, from Sp. tajar, pronounced as /taˈʃar/ in Middle Spanish). Loanwords which have the pronunciation that reflects the transition from Middle Spanish /ʃ/ to Modern Spanish /x/ are also present in Tagalog. The Modern Spanish /x/ sound is rendered in Tagalog as [h], which is the standard pronunciation in other Spanish dialects. Example cases include ahedres (from Sp. ajedrez), anghél (from Sp. ángel), halayá (from Sp. jalea), hardín (from Sp. jardín), hepe (police chief, from Sp. jefe), kahera and kahero (cashier, from Sp. cajera and cajero respectively) and kahón (from Sp. cajón). There are also rare cases of doublets that exhibit influences of both the Middle Spanish /ʃ/ and Modern Spanish /x/ like for example in the cases of Tagalog muson and mohon (both from Sp. mojón) and relos and relo (both from Sp. reloj).

The compound word batya't palo–palo, a phrase in the laundry business where many Spanish words proliferate. The words were taken from the Spanish batea for "washing tub" and palo for "stick", something a typical Filipino might think had no Spanish provenance at all because of the Tagalog verb palò which means "strike".

Some loanwords have been associated to new meanings, such as kursonada (corazonada, originally meaning '"hunch"), which means "object of desire"; sospetsoso (sospechoso) is the "suspicious person" and not the "suspect" as in the original; insekto ("insecto"), which still means "insect" but also refers to a "pesty clownish person"; or even sige (sigue), a Spanish word for "continue" or "follow", which is popularly understood to mean "all right" or "go ahead".

Some Spanish affixes are combined with Tagalog words to make new words. For example, pakialamero (from Tag. pakialam, "to meddle" and the Sp. suffix –ero, masculine subject); majongero ("mahjong", ultimately from Chinese, and the Sp. suffix –ero); basketbolista, boksingero. Daisysiete is a word play and portmanteau of the English "daisy" and the Spanish diecisiete ("seventeen"), now meaning a sweet and sexually desirable underaged (17 year-old) female. Bastusing katawán (Sp.: basto -> bastós & Tag.: katawán) is an example of a two-word term for a bombshell body.

Tagalog still uses Spanish language influence in coining new words, e.g., alaskadór ("Alaska" + Sp. suffix '–ador'); bérde ("verde"="green", nuanced to "toilet humour" or "blue joke", a literal Tagalog translation of Philippine English term "green(-minded)".); which are not readily understood in Spain or any Latin American country.

=== Spanish influences on Tagalog morphosyntax ===
Although the overall influence of Spanish on the morphosyntax of the Tagalog language was minimal, there are fully functional Spanish-derived words that have produced syntactic innovations on Tagalog. Clear influences of Spanish can be seen in the morphosyntax of comparison and the existence of Spanish-derived modals and conjunctions, as will be discussed in more detail below.

==== Kumustá as an interrogative word in Tagalog ====
All of the interrogative words used in Tagalog are not related to Spanish, with the exception of kumustá. The word kumustá is derived from the Spanish ¿cómo está? and it functions as a Tagalog interrogative word used as a substitute for an adjective of quality or condition equivalent to the English how. Kumustá can also be used as a greeting (similar to English "Hello!") or as a verb with the meaning of "to greet" or "to say hello". The native term can be used as Ohoy and Taupo, however these were lost in translations.

==== Spanish-derived comparative markers ====
Tagalog has several comparative markers that are etymologically derived from Spanish. The particle mas (meaning "more", from Sp. más), in conjunction with the various Tagalog counterparts of the English "than" (kaysa + sa-marker, sa, kay), is used as a comparative marker of non-equality. Another comparative marker of non-equality is kumpará (from Sp. comparado), usually followed with the appropriate sa-marker and used as the Tagalog equivalent of the English "compared to". Lastly, the word pareho (from Sp. parejo), commonly employed with the Tagalog linker -ng, is used as a comparative marker of equality.

==== Spanish-derived Tagalog modals ====
There are several Spanish-derived words that have acquired function as modals upon adoption in Tagalog. Tagalog modals, including those that are etymologically derived from Spanish, can be classified into two main groups: words realizing deontic modality (i.e. modals concerned with expressing inclination, obligation and ability) and words realizing epistemic modality (i.e. modals concerned with degrees of reality).

Deontic modality in Tagalog is realized through words which are grammaticized by Paul Schachter and Fe T. Otanes as "pseudo-verbs". An example of a Spanish-derived Tagalog deontic modal is gusto (from Sp. gusto), which is used to denote preference or desire. Gusto is considered to be more commonly used than its other counterparts newly adapted to this usage such as nais or ibig, since these two words are usually perceived as more formal than gustó and are more commonly used in literature than in colloquial speech; in native Tagalog synonyms, nais is more commonly used in colloquial speech than ibig as an alternate of gustó and also commonly used as a noun for "desire", "want", or "wish". Another example is puwede (from Sp. puede), which can be translated in English as "can" and is thus used to express permission or ability. The word puwede co-exists with its equivalent maaárì and the two pseudo-verbs are deemed to have little semantic difference, with puwede only being considered usually as more colloquial and less formal than maaarì.

Epistemic modality in Tagalog is realized through words functioning as adverbials. These words, when used as modals, are typically linked to the clause that they modalize through the Tagalog linker -ng or na. An example of a Spanish-derived epistemic modal used for expressing high degree of probability is sigurado + -ng (from Sp. seguro + -ado), with the meaning of "surely" or "certainly", and is considered as a synonym of Tagalog tiyak, sigurado is derived from "asegurado", "assured". The word siguro (from Sp. seguro) is an epistemic modal marking moderate degree of probability, with the meaning of "maybe", "probably" or "perhaps". The word siguro is also identified by the linguist Ekaterina Baklanova as a Spanish-derived discourse marker in Tagalog, thus contrasting the claims of other scholars such as Patrick Steinkrüger that none of the numerous discourse markers in Tagalog are of Spanish origin. Similarly to Tagalog, the word siguro is also considered as an adverbial clitic in Cebuano and in Masbateño. Posible + -ng (from Sp. posible), which can be translated to English as "possibly", is a Tagalog epistemic modal marking low degree of probability. Examples of Spanish-derived Tagalog epistemic modals marking excessive degree of intensity include masyado + -ng (from Sp. demasiado) and sobra + -ng (from Sp. sobra) while medyo (from Sp. medio) marks moderate degree of intensity.

==== Spanish-derived Tagalog conjunctions ====
Several conjunctions in Tagalog have Spanish-derived etymological roots. The Tagalog disjunctive conjunction o (from Sp. o, meaning "or") has completely substituted the old Tagalog equivalent "kun", rendering the latter obsolete. Two Spanish-derived counter-expectational adversative conjunctions used in Tagalog are pero (from Sp. pero) and kaso (from Sp. caso), both of which are considered as synonyms of the Tagalog counterparts ngunit, subalit, etc. The Tagalog ni (from Sp. ni) can be used as a negative repetitive conjunction, similar to the English "neither...nor" construction. When not repeated, ni assumes a scalar focus value stripped of all its conjunction function, translatable to English as "not even". Basta (from Sp. basta), when used as a conditional conjunction, assumes a meaning similar to English "as long as" or "provided that". Maski (from Sp. mas que) is a synonym of Tagalog kahit and both are used as Tagalog concessive conjunctions. Porke (from Sp. porque) assumes the function of causal conjunction in Tagalog and it is used to express an ironic or critical attitude, translatable to English as "just because" or "only because"; porke is a synonym of Tagalog dahil (exact translation of "because") and dahil lang (lámang) (exact translation of "just because" and "only because"), and all are used as Tagalog causal conjunctions. The Tagalog puwera (kung) (from Sp. fuera) is used as a negative exceptive conditional conjunction, translatable in English as "unless" or "except if", used alongside "maliban sa" or "liban sa". The Tagalog oras na (from Sp. hora) is a temporal conjunction which can be translated in English as "the moment that". The Tagalog imbés na (from Sp. en vez) is used as an implicit adversative conjunction and it can be translated in English as "instead of". The Tagalog para (from Sp. para), when used to introduce verb-less or basic-form predicates, assumes the role of a purposive conjunction. However, if followed by the appropriate dative sa-marker, para assumes the role of a benefactive marker in Tagalog.

=== Loanwords that underwent semantic shift ===
Upon adoption into Tagalog, a number of Spanish-derived terms underwent a process of semantic shift or change in meaning. A loanword is said to have undergone a semantic shift if its meaning in Tagalog deviates from the original meaning of the word in the source language (in this case, Spanish). A type of semantic shift is the so-called semantic narrowing, which is a linguistic phenomenon in which the meaning of a Spanish-derived word acquires a less general or inclusive meaning upon adoption into Tagalog. Semantic narrowing occurs when a word undergoes specialization of usage. For example, the word kuryente (meaning "electricity" or "electric current") comes from the Spanish word corriente, which is a general term to refer to any current, whether electric or not. Upon adoption of the word corriente into Tagalog as kuryente, it underwent a semantic narrowing and its usage became restricted to refer only to an electric current, unlike its Spanish counterpart. Another example of a semantic narrowing is the Tagalog word ruweda (meaning "Ferris wheel"), a term derived from the Spanish word rueda which refers to any kind of wheel. Upon adoption into Tagalog, ruweda underwent usage specialization and its meaning became restricted to the Ferris wheel.

Semantic shift may also occur through semantic interference by another language, usually the English language. This phenomenon can result into reinterpretation of a Spanish-derived term by attributing to it an English meaning upon assimilation into Tagalog. An example is the Tagalog word libre, which is derived from the Spanish translation of the English word free, although used in Tagalog with the meaning of "without cost or payment" or "free of charge", a usage which would be deemed incorrect in Spanish as the term gratis would be more fitting; Tagalog word libre can also mean free in aspect of time, like "Libre ang oras" or "Libre ang panahon" ("The time/hour is free", in the sense that the time is available). Another example is the Tagalog word iskiyerda, derived from the Spanish term izquierda meaning "left" as opposed to "right", although used in Tagalog with the meaning of "to leave".

Here is the list of Spanish-derived words which underwent semantic shift upon assimilation into Tagalog:

Tagalog	Spanish-derived word	Meaning in Tagalog	Spanish equivalent
alahero	alhajero (“jewel case”)	jeweller; jewel-maker	joyero
algodón	algodón (“cotton”)	false trevally (Lactarius lactarius)	pagapa; pez blanco
alpahór	alfajor (Spanish traditional confection)	bilo-bilo (sticky rice balls in coconut milk)	gacha dulce de arroz con leche de coco
almohadilya	almohadilla (“cushion” or “small pillow”)	mousepad	alfombrilla para el ratón o mouse
almusál	almorzar (“to have lunch”)	breakfast	desayuno
asár	asar (“to roast”)	to annoy	molestar
bahura	bajura (“coastal; shallow-water”)	coral reef	arrecife coralina
barako	verraco (“male boar”)	manly; fearless; strong and bitter (as coffee)	varonil
barkada	barcada (“boatload; boat trip”)	group of friends; clique	pandilla de amigos o camaradas
bastá	basta (“enough”)	just so that; as long as	siempre y cuando; siempre que
bida	vida (“life”)	protagonist	protagonista
biskotso	bizcocho (“sponge cake”)	toast bread	pan tostado
boso	buzo (“diver”)	voyeurism	voyerismo
bulsá	bolsa (“bag”)	pocket in garments	bolsillo
dehado	dejado (“left behind; careless”)	underdog; at a disadvantage (sometimes translated to "left behind")	desfavorecido; desaventajado
delikado	delicado (“delicate”)	dangerous	peligroso
desgrasya	desgracia (“misfortune”)	accident	accidente
desgrasyada	desgraciada (“unfortunate; miserable”)	unwed mother	madre soltera
deskarte	descarte (“discard”)	resourcefulness	ingeniosidad; capacidad de improvisación
dilihénsiyá	diligencia (“diligence; errand”)	act of asking for a loan or debt; act of borrowing money	pedir un préstamo
engkanto	encanto (“spell; enchantment”)	fairy, elf, or spirit	hada; duende
gisado	guisado (“stew”)	sauteéed	salteado
harana	jarana (“commotion; partying; revelry”)	serenade	serenata
hepe	jefe (“chief; boss”)	police chief (also used as translation of "chief" in general)	comisario; jefe de policía
impakto	impacto (“impact; shock”)	evil spirit	espíritu maligno; demonio
inutil	inútil (“useless”)	impotent	sexualmente impotente
iskiyerda	izquierda (“left”)	to leave	irse de; abandonar
kabayo	caballo (“horse”)	ironing board	tabla de planchar
kabesera	cabecera (“head; heading; headboard”)	capital city or town	capital; ciudad cabecera
kakawate	cacahuate (“peanut”)	Gliricidia sepium	madre de cacao
kasi	casi (“much”)	because	porque
kasilyas	casillas (“cubicles”)	toilet; restroom	baño
kasta	casta (“caste; lineage”)	breeding; mating; sex act or making love	crianza; apareamiento; acto sexual
kódigó	código (“code”)	cheat sheet	apunte escondido; acordeón; chuleta
konyo	coño (“vagina”)	socialite; belonging to the upper-class	de clase alta
koryente	corriente (“current”)	electricity; electric current	electricidad; corriente eléctrica
kubeta	cubeta (“bucket”)	toilet; restroom	baño
kulebra	culebra (“snake”)	shingles	culebrilla; herpes zóster
kursunada	corazonada (“hunch”)	object of interest or desire	deseo del corazón
labakara	lavacara (“washbasin”)	face towel	toalla de tocador
lakwatsa	la cuacha (“the excrement”)	truancy; act of loafing around or roaming	vaguear; holgazanear; hacer novillos
lamyerda	la mierda (“the excrement”)	truancy; out loafing; out roaming	vaguear; holgazanear; hacer novillos
libre	libre (“free”)	free of charge	gratis
liyamado	llamado (“called'; named, destined”)	favorite (as in betting, races, etc.); at an advantage	favorecido
mantikà	manteca (“lard; butter”)	cooking oil	aceite
palengke	palenque (“stockade; palisade”)	market	mercado
paletada	paletada (“shovelful; trowelful”)	plaster	yeso
papagayo	papagayo (“parrot”)	kite	cometa
parol	farol (“lantern; lamp; streetlight”)	Christmas lantern	estrella navideña; farol navideño
parolero	farolero (“lamplighter”)	Christmas lantern maker	artesano de estrellas navideñas; artesano de faroles navideños
pasamano	pasamano (“handrail”)	window sill	alféizar, repisa de la ventana
pitso	pecho (“chest; bosom”)	chicken breast	pechuga de pollo
poso negro	pozo negro (“cesspit; cesspool; soak pit”)	septic tank; holding tank	fosa séptica
putahe	potaje (“vegetable stew or soup”)	dish; course	plato
rebentadór	reventador (“agitator”)	firecracker	petardo
rekado	recado (“message; errand”)	spices; condiments	especia; condimiento
ruweda	rueda (“wheel”)	Ferris wheel	noria; rueda de la fortuna
semilya	semilla (“seed”)	semen	semen
sentido	sentido (“sense; meaning”)	temple (anatomy)	templo; sien
siguro	seguro (“surely”)	maybe; perhaps; probably	quizás; probablemente
silindro	cilindro (“cylinder”)	harmonica	armónica
sintás	cinta (“ribbon; tape; belt”)	shoelace	cordón de zapato; cintas para zapatos
siyempre	siempre (“always”)	of course	por supuesto
sosyál	social (“social; societal”)	high society; belonging to the upper class, fancy	de clase (social) alta
suplado	soplado (“blown; inflated”)	snobbish; haughty	presuntuoso, arrogante
suporta	soportar (“to withstand; to bear”)	support	apoyo
sustánsiyá	sustancia (“substance”)	nutrient	sustancia nutritiva; nutriente
todas	toda (“all”)	completely killed or exterminated	matar
todo	todo (“all; entire; each; every; etc.”)	all-out; entire; fully; maximum	al máximo
tosino	tocino (“bacon”)	sweet cured meat	carne curada endulzada
tsampurado	champurrado (“chocolate-based atole”)	sweet chocolate rice porridge	arroz al chocolate
tsika	chica (“girl”)	gossip	chisme
turon	turrón (“nougat”)	fried banana roll	rollo de platano frito
tuwalya	toalla (“towel”)	tripe	mondongo; tripa; callos

=== Tagalog words derived from pluralized Spanish nouns ===
Some of the Spanish loanwords in Tagalog appear in their pluralized form, marked with -s or -es. However, in Tagalog, such words are not considered as plural and when they are pluralized in Tagalog, they need to be pluralized in the way that Tagalog pluralizes native words, i.e., by placing the pluralization marker mga before the word. For example, the word butones (meaning button used in clothing, from Sp. botones) is considered singular in Tagalog and its plural form is mga butones.

Tagalog	Spanish	Meaning in Spanish	Meaning in Tagalog
alahas	alhaja (plural: alhajas)	jewel; jewelry	jewel; jewelry
alkatsopas	alcachofa (plural: alcachofas)	artichoke	artichoke
arátiles	dátil (plural: dátiles)	date (Phoenix dactilyfera)	calabur or Panama cherry (Muntingia calabura)
armás	arma (plural: armas)	weapon; arm	weapon; arm
balbás	barba (plural: barbas)	beard (facial hair)	beard (facial hair)
banyos	baño (plural: baños)	bath; bathroom	sponge bath
bayabas	guayaba (plural: guayabas)	guava	guava
beses	vez (plural: veces)	time (repetition)	time (repetition)
boses	voz (plural: voces)	voice	voice
butones (var. bitones)	botón (plural: botones)	button (clothing)	button (clothing)
datos	dato (plural: datos)	fact; detail; piece of Information; data	data
garbansos	garbanzo (plural: garbanzos)	chickpea	chickpea
gastos	gasto (plural: gastos)	cost; expense; spending	cost; expense; spending
gisantes	guisante (plural: guisantes)	pea	pea
guwantes	guante (plural: guantes)	glove	glove
kalatás	carta (plural: cartas)	letter; chart; charter	paper; white paper; letter; written message
kamatis	tomate (plural: tomates)	tomato	tomato
kasilyas	casilla (plural: casillas)	cubicle; booth	toilet
kastanyas	castaña (plural: castañas)	chestnut	chestnut
kostilyas	costilla (plural: costillas)	rib	rib
kubyertos	cubierto (plural: cubiertos)	cutlery; silverware	cutlery; silverware
kuwerdas	cuerda (plural: cuerdas)	rope; string; chord	string (of a musical instrument)
kuwitis	cohete (plural: cohetes)	rocket	skyrocket (firework)
labanós	rabano (plural: rabanos)	radish	radish
lansones	lanzón (plural: lanzones)	langsat (Lansium domesticum)	langsat (Lansium domesticum)
letsugas	lechuga (plural: lechugas)	lettuce	lettuce
manggás	manga (plural: mangas)	sleeve	sleeve
mansanas	manzana (plural: manzanas)	apple	apple
materyales	material (plural: materiales)	material	material
medyas	media (plural: medias)	sock	sock
notisyas	noticia (plural: noticias)	message, news	notice
opisyales	oficial (plural: oficiales)	officer	Officer
oras	hora (plural: horas)	hour (unit)	hour (unit of time); time
panderetas	pandereta (plural: panderetas)	tambourine	tambourine
palanas	plana (plural: planas)	plain	flat area along a river
papeles	papel (plural: papeles)	paper	document
patatas	patata (plural: patatas)	potato	potato
pares	par (plural: pares)	pair	(noun) pair; (adjective) similar
pasas	pasa (plural: pasas)	raisin	raisin
pastilyas	pastilla (plural: pastillas)	pill; tablet; candy	Sweet milk candy
peras	pera (plural: peras)	pear	pear
perlas	perla (plural: perlas)	pearl	pearl
pilduras	pildora (plural: pildoras)	pill; tablet	medicinal pill
pohas	foja (plural: fojas)	sheet	sheet
posas	esposa (plural: esposas)	handcuffs	handcuffs
presas	presa (plural: presas)	strawberry	strawberry
prutas	fruta (plural: frutas)	fruit	fruit
pulbós	polvo (plural: polvos)	dust; powder	powder
pulseras	pulsera (plural: pulseras)	bracelet	bracelet
puntos	punto (plural: puntos)	dot; period; point (sports)	score; points
rehas	reja (plural: rejas)	bar; railing	bar; railing
riles	carril (plural: carriles)	lane; track	rail; railroad; railway
rosas	rosa (plural: rosas)	rose	rose
salas	sala (plural: salas)	hall; living room	living room
sapatos	zapato (plural: zapatos)	shoe	shoe
sardinas	sardina (plural: sardinas)	sardine	sardine
senyales	señal (plural: señales)	sign; signal	sign
senyas	seña (plural: señas)	sign; signal	sign; signal
sibuyas	cebolla (plural: cebollas)	onion	onion
sigarilyas	seguidilla (plural: seguidillas)	(Philippine Spanish) winged bean	winged bean
silahis	celaje (plural: celajes)	cloudscape; skylight	sunray; bisexual (slang)
singkamas	jícama (plural: jícamas)	Mexican turnip (Pachyrhizus erosus)	Mexican turnip (Pachyrhizus erosus)
sintas	cinta (plural: cintas)	ribbon; tape; lace	shoelace
sintomas	síntoma (plural: síntomas)	symptom	symptom
sopas	sopa (plural: sopas)	soup	soup dish
sorbetes	sorbete (plural: sorbetes)	sorbet	ice cream
tsinelas	chinela (plural: chinelas)	slippers; flip-flops	slippers; flip-flops
tsismis	chisme (plural: chismes)	gossip	gossip
ubas	uva (plural: uvas)	grape	grape
uhales	ojal (plural: ojales)	buttonhole	buttonhole
uhas	hoja (plural: hojas)	leaf	sheet metal

=== Tagalog words derived from Spanish verbs ===
Several Spanish verbs are also adopted into Tagalog. Most of them are in their infinitive form characterized by the deletion of their final /r/, like for example in the case of the Tagalog intindi (to understand) derived from the Spanish verb entender. This feature is also found in Chavacano verbs which have a Spanish origin and it can be argued that an already restructured form of Spanish (Chavacano or a pidgin) was the origin of these Tagalog words. A list of these loanwords can be viewed below.

Alternatively, upon adoption into Tagalog, the final /r/ of the Spanish verbs in their infinitive form becomes /l/. Such is the case of the following loanwords: almusal (to have breakfast, from Sp. almorzar), dasal (from Sp. rezar), dupikal (from Sp. repicar), kasál (from Sp. casar), kumpisál (from Sp. confesar), minindál (from Sp. merendar), pasyál (from Sp. pasear) and sugál (from Sp. jugar). In some cases, the final /r/ remains unaltered in the Tagalog form like in the case of andár (to set in action or motion; from Sp. andar), asár (to annoy or to verbally irritate; from Sp. asar) and pundár (to establish or to save money for something; from Sp. fundar).

Conjugated Spanish verbs are also adopted into Tagalog. Examples include: pára (from Sp. parar), pása (from Sp. pasar), puwede (from Sp. poder), tíra (from Sp. tirar) and sige (from Sp. seguir). Imbiyerna (meaning to annoy or to irritate someone) is derived from the Spanish verb infernar (meaning to irritate or to provoke) and was allegedly coined by Ricardo "Rikki" Dalu, originally to describe the hellish feeling and the frustration he experienced when attending Spanish classes. In some cases, the conjugated verbs are combined with another word to form Tagalog morphemes like in the case of the following words: asikaso (from the combination of Sp. hacer and Sp. caso), balewala or baliwala (from the combination of Sp. valer and Tag. wala), etsapwera (from the combination of Sp. echar and Sp. fuera) and kumusta (from the combination of Sp. cómo and Sp. estar).

Tagalog	Spanish	Meaning in Spanish	Meaning in Tagalog
akusá	acusar	to accuse	to accuse
alsá	alzar	to lift; to raise; to erect	to rise in rebellion
analisá	analizar	to analyze	to analyze
apelá	apelar	to appeal	to appeal
aprobá	aprobar	to approve	to approve
apurá	apurar	to finish; to rush (Lat. Am.)	to hurry
arkilá (var. alkilá)	alquilar	to rent; to rent out	to rent; to rent out
asintá	asentar	to set up; to secure; to lay down	to aim at
aturgá	otorgar	to grant; to bestow; to confer	to take on responsibility
awtorisá	autorizar	to authorize	to authorize
bará	barrar	to cover in mud	to block; to clog
batí	batir	to beat; to whisk; to whip	to beat; to whisk; to whip; to masturbate (vulgar)
beripiká	verificar	to verify	to verify
bulkanisá	vulcanizar	to vulcanize	to vulcanize
burá	borrar	to erase	to erase
burdá	bordar	to embroider	to embroider
deklará	declarar	to declare	to declare
des-aprobá	desaprobar	to disapprove	to disapprove
des-armá	desarmar	to disarm	to disarm
des-impektá	desinfectar	to disinfect	to disinfect
deskargá	descargar	to unload; to discharge; to download	to unload
deskubrí	descubrir	to discover	to discover
desmayá	desmayar	to become disheartened; to become demoralized	to become disheartened; to become demoralized
destrungká	destroncar	to hack away	to forcefully open a door, a lock, etc.
determiná	determinar	to determine	to determine
diktá	dictar	to dictate	to dictate
dimití	dimitir	to resign	to resign
dirihí	dirigir	to manage; to be in charge of	to manage; to be in charge of
disimulá	disimular	to conceal; to cover up	to conceal; to cover up
diskitá	desquitar	to make up for	to take it out on
galbanisá	galvanizar	to galvanize	to galvanize
gisá	guisar	to stew	to saute, to stir fry in oil (usually with garlic and onions)
hulmá	ahormar	to shape; to mould	to shape; to mould
husgá	juzgar	to judge	to judge
imbestigá	investigar	to investigate	to investigate
imbitá	invitar	to invite	to invite
intindí	entender	to understand	to understand
itsá	echar	to throw	to throw
kalkulá	calcular	to calculate	to calculate
kanselá	cancelar	to cancel	to cancel
kantá	cantar	to sing	to sing
kargá	cargar	to load; to charge; to fill	to load; to charge; to fill
kobrá	cobrar	to demand or to receive payment	to demand or to receive payment
kodipiká	codificar	to codify; to encode	to codify; to encode
kompará	comparar	to compare	to compare
komponé (var. kumpuní)	componer	to make up; to compose; to repair	to repair
kondená	condenar	to condemn	to condemn
konserbá	conservar	to conserve	to conserve
konsiderá	considerar	to consider	to consider
kublí	cubrir	to cover; to cover up	to hide from sight
kulá	colar	to strain; to bleach	to bleach
kultí	curtir	to tan	to treat leather or other materials with tanning agents (e.g. tannin)
kumbidá	convidar	to invite	to invite
kumbinsí	convencir	to convince	to convince
kumpirmá	confirmar	to confirm	to confirm
kumpiská	confiscar	to confiscate; to seize	to confiscate; to seize
kusí	cocer	to cook	to cook
labá	lavar	to wash	to wash
legalisá	legalizar	to legalize	to legalize
liberalisá	liberalizar	to liberalize	to liberalize
manipulá	manipular	to manipulate	to manipulate
marká	marcar	to mark	to mark
nominá	nominar	to nominate	to nominate
obligá	obligar	to force; to oblige	to force; to oblige
obserbá	observar	to observe	to observe
operá	operar	to operate	to surgically operate
palsipiká	falsificar	to falsify	to falsify
palyá	fallar	to fail; to break down and stop working	to fail; to break down and stop working
paralisá	paralizar	to paralyze	to paralyze
pasá	pasar	to pass; to happen; to go through	to pass an academic course, an examination, an interview, etc.
pasmá	pasmar	to amaze; to astonish; to chill to the bone	pasma (folk illness) and, by extension, to have pasma
pintá	pintar	to paint	to paint
pirmá	firmar	to sign	to sign
pormalisá	formalizar	to formalize	to formalize
prepará	preparar	to prepare	to prepare
preserbá	preservar	to preserve	to preserve
proklamá	proclamar	to proclaim	to proclaim
pundí	fundir	to melt; to merge	to burn out
puntá	apuntar	to aim; to point out; to write down	to go to
purgá	purgar	to purge	to cleanse; to take a purgative or laxative
pursigí	perseguir	to pursue; to follow; to chase; to persecute	to persevere
pustá	apostar	to bet; to wager	to bet; to wager
ratipiká	ratificar	to ratify	to ratify
reboká	revocar	to revoke	to revoke
rekomendá	recomendar	to recommend	to recommend
repiná	refinar	to refine	to refine
reporma	reformar	to reform	to reform
sangkutsá	sancochar or salcochar	to boil with water and salt	to pre-cook food with spices and aromatics
salbá	salvar	to save	to save
sará	cerrar	to close	to close
silbí	servir	to serve	to serve
sindí	encender	to ignite; to turn on; to switch on	to ignite; to turn on; to switch on
suldá	soldar	to solder; to weld	to solder; to weld
sulsí	zurcir	to sew; to mend	to sew; to mend
sumité	someter	to subdue; to subjugate; to submit	to submit; to put forward
suspendé	suspendir	to suspend	to suspend
tantiyá	tantear	to feel; to weigh up; to estimate	to estimate
tarantá	atarantar	to stun; to daze; to stupify	to confuse; to baffle; to bewilder
tasá	tajar	to chop; to cut; to slice	to sharpen
timplá	templar	to cool down; to moderate	to blend; to mix; to prepare drinks, medicine, chemical solutions, etc.
tostá	tostar	to toast	to toast
tumbá	tumbar	to knock down	to knock down
umpisá	empezar	to begin; to start	to begin; to start

=== Spanish-Tagalog hybrid compound terms ===
Some Tagalog compound terms are actually formed through a combination of a native Tagalog term and an etymologically Spanish term, like in the case of the idiomatic expression balát-sibuyas (a term referring to a person's easiness to be offended), which is a combination of the Tagalog balát and Spanish cebolla. The linguist Ekaterina Baklanova distinguishes at least two types of Spanish-Tagalog compound terms: hybrid loanwords or mixed-borrowings are partially translated Spanish terms which are adopted into Tagalog, e.g. karnerong-dagat (derived from the Spanish term carnero marino, meaning "seal") and anemonang-dagat (derived from the Spanish term anémona de mar, meaning "sea anemone"), while hybrid neologisms are new terms invented by Filipinos with use of some native and already assimilated Spanish-derived material, e.g. pader-ilog, meaning "embankment", derived from the combination of the Tagalog word ilog (meaning "river") and Spanish word pared (meaning "wall" and adopted in Tagalog as the word pader).

Below is the list of some Spanish-Tagalog hybrid compound terms. Because of the lack of standardization, some of the compound terms listed below are written differently (i.e. without the hyphen) in other Tagalog-based literature. For example, while the term sirang-plaka is usually encountered in many Tagalog-based works without the hyphen, there are also some instances of the term being written with the hyphen like in the case of one of the books written by the Chairman of the Commission on the Filipino Language Virgilio Almario, entitled Filipino ng mga Filipino: mga problema sa ispeling, retorika, at pagpapayaman ng wikang pambansa. Another example is the term takdang-oras, which can also be encountered in the literature without the hyphen. As a rule, a hybrid compound term below will be hyphenated if it has at least one instance of it being written with the hyphen in Tagalog-based literary works.

Compound term	Root words	Meaning
agaw-eksena	agaw (“to snatch”, from Tagalog) + eksena (from Sp. escena)	scene-stealer
alsá-balutan	alsa (from Sp. alzar) + balutan (“package”, from Tagalog)	to pack up; to change residence
amóy-tsiko	amoy (“smell”, from Tagalog) + tsiko (from Sp. chicozapote)	drunk; intoxicated
anémonáng-dagat	anemona (from Sp. anémona) + dagat (“sea”, from Tagalog)	sea anemone
bagong-saltá	bago (“new”, from Tagalog) + salta (from Sp. saltar)	newcomer
balát-sibuyas	balat (“skin”, from Tagalog) + sibuyas (from Sp. cebollas)	a person who is easily offended
balík-eskuwela	balik (“return”, from Tagalog) + eskuwela (from Sp. escuela)	back-to-school
bantáy-sarado	bantay (“to guard”, from Tagalog) + sarado (from Sp. cerrado)	well-guarded; closely guarded
batàng-kálye	bata ("child", from Tagalog) + kalye (from Sp. calle)	street child
batás-trápikó	batas ("law", from Tagalog) + trapiko (from Sp. tráfico)	traffic law
bawas-presyo	bawas ("decrease", from Tagalog) + presyo (from Sp. precio)	price decrease
bigáy-todo	bigay (“to give”, from Tagalog) + todo (from Sp. todo)	giving one's all
boses-ipis	boses (from Sp. voces) + ipis (“cockroach”, from Tagalog)	inaudible voice
boses-palakâ	boses (from Sp. voces) + palaka (“frog”, from Tagalog)	croaky voice
bugbóg-sarado	bugbog (“beat up”, from Tagalog) + sarado (from Sp. cerrado)	heavily beaten
bulak-niyebe	bulak (“cotton”, from Tagalog) + niyebe (from Sp. nieve)	snowflake
dilang-anghél	dila (“tongue”, from Tagalog) + anghel (from Sp. angel)	having the gift of prophecy
dilang-baka	dila (“tongue”, from Tagalog) + baka (from Sp. vaca)	Opuntia cochenillifera
doble-ingat	doble (from Sp. doble) + ingat (“to be cautious”, from Tagalog)	to take extra precautions
doble-talim	doble (from Sp. doble) + talim (“sharpness”, from Tagalog)	double-edged
épikóng-bayan	epiko (from Sp. poema épico) + bayan (“country”, from Tagalog)	folk epic
esponghang-dagat	espongha (from. Sp. esponja) + dagat (“sea”, from Tagalog)	sea sponge
giyera-patanì	giyera (from Sp. guerra) + patani (from Tagalog term for Phaseolus lunatus)	heated verbal exchange
hating-globo	hati (“half”, from Tagalog) + globo (from Sp. globo)	hemisphere
hirám-kantores	hiram (“to borrow”, from Tagalog) + kantores (from Sp. cantores)	non-returnable
kabayong-dagat	kabayo (from Sp. cavallo) + dagat (“sea”, from Tagalog)	seahorse (Hippocampus spp.)
karnerong-dagat	karnero (from Sp. carnero) + dagat (“sea”, from Tagalog)	seal
kayod-marino	kayod (“to grate; grind”, from Tagalog) + marino (from Sp. marino)	hard worker
kilos-protesta	kilos (“movement”, from Tagalog) + protesta (from Sp. protesta)	demonstration; street protest
kuwentong-bayan	kuwento (from Sp. cuento) + bayan (“folk; people; country”, from Tagalog)	folk stories
lakad-pato	lakad (“walk”, from Tagalog) + pato (from Sp. pato)	waddle
leóng-dagat	leon (from Sp. león) + dagat (“sea”, from Tagalog)	sea lion
mukháng-pera	mukhâ (“face”, from Tagalog) + pera (from Sp. perra gorda or perra chica)	profit-oriented; easily corruptible through bribes
padér-ilog	pader (from Sp. pared) + ilog (“river”, from Tagalog)	embankment
pampalipas-oras	lipas (“to pass”, from Tagalog) + oras (from Sp. horas)	pastime; hobby
pandáy-yero	panday (“smith”, from Tagalog) + yero (from Sp. hierro)	ironsmith
patáy-malisya	patay (“dead”, from Tagalog) + malisya (from Sp. malicia)	feigning innocence; pretending not to know that something is amiss
pusong-mamón	pusò (“heart”, from Tagalog) + mamón (from Sp. mamón)	soft-hearted; kind and compassionate
sanib-puwersa	sanib (“to join together”, from Tagalog) + puwersa (from Sp. fuerza)	to join forces
siling-habâ	sili (from Sp. chile) + haba (“lengthened”, from Tagalong)	Capsicum annuum var. longum
siling-labuyò	sili (from Sp. chile) + labuyo (“wild chicken”, from Tagalog)	Capsicum frutescens
singsíng-pari	singsing (“ring”, from Tagalog) + pari (“priest”, from Sp. padre)	millipede
siráng-plaka	sira (“broken”, from Tagalog) + plaka (from Sp. placa)	broken record
sulat-makinilya	sulat (“script; writing”, from Tagalog) + makinilya (from Sp. maquinilla)	typewritten
taás-presyo	taas (“high”, from Tagalog) + presyo (from Sp. precio)	price increase
tabíng-kalsada	tabi (“side”, from Tagalog) + kalsada (from Sp. calzada)	roadside
tabíng-kalye	tabi (“side”, from Tagalog) + kalye (from Sp. calle)	roadside
takaw-aksidente	takaw (“greed”, from Tagalog) + aksidente (from Sp. accidente)	accident-prone
takaw-desgrasya	takaw (“greed”, from Tagalog) + desgrasya (from Sp. desgracia)	accident-prone
takdáng-oras	takda (“to set; to assign”, from Tagalog) + oras (from Sp. horas)	fixed or appointed time
takdáng-petsa	takda (“to set; to assign”, from Tagalog) + petsa (from Sp. fecha)	due date; deadline
taním-bala	tanim (“to plant”, from Tagalog) + bala (from Sp. bala)	planting evidence of illegal bullet possession
taním-droga	tanim (“to plant”, from Tagalog) + droga (from Sp. droga)	planting evidence of illegal drug possession
taong-grasa	tao (“person”, from Tagalog) + grasa (from Sp. grasa)	homeless man or woman
tubig-gripo	tubig (“water”, from Tagalog) + gripo (from Sp. grifo)	tap water
tulak-droga	tulak (“to push”, from Tagalog) + droga (from Sp. droga)	drug pusher
tulog-mantikà	tulog (“sleep”, from Tagalog) + mantikà (from Sp. manteca)	someone or something that doesn't wake up easily
tunóg-lata	tunog (“sound; tune”, from Tagalog) + lata (from Sp. lata)	tinny; sounding like tin

== English ==
English has been used in everyday Tagalog conversation. Code-switching between Tagalog and English is called Taglish. English words borrowed by Tagalog are mostly modern and technical terms, but some English words are also used for short usage (many Tagalog words translated from English are very long) or to avoid literal translation and repetition of the same particular Tagalog word. English makes the second largest foreign vocabulary of Tagalog after Spanish. In written language, English words in a Tagalog sentence are usually written as they are, but they are sometimes written in Tagalog phonetic spelling. Here are some examples:

Tagalog	English	Traditional word(s)
ábakús	abacus	
abnormál	abnormal	di-karaniwan, di-normál (normal = Sp.), pambihirà
abórsiyón	abortion	pagpapalaglág
absent	absent	liban
aders	(from "others") not belonging to a group	ibá, hindî kabílang, hindî kasáma, ibáng tao
adik	addict	sugapâ
ádmirál	admiral	laksamana
adres	address (computing)	
adyenda	agenda	palatuntunan
akáwnt	account (computing)	
akawntant	accountant	tagatuos, tagapagtuos
ákroním	acronym	daglát, dinaglát
akrostik	acrostic	
akses	access	kakayaháng makuha, kakayaháng maabót, kakayaháng makapasok, kamít
aksis	axis	painugan, gargaran
aktres	actress	artista (Sp.)
akwaryum	aquarium	pabiyáy, akwaryo (Sp. acuario)
álibáy	alibi	dahilán, reklamo (Sp. reclamo), palusót
alumnay	alumni	alumno (m) & alumna (f) (Sp.), nagtapós
ambus	ambush	tambangán, tambáng
amonya	ammonia	amonyako (Sp. amoníaco)
ampibyan	amphibian, amphibious	ampibyo (Sp. anfibio)
anawnser	announcer	tagapagpahayág, tagapagbalità (radio announcer)
apír	(from “up here”) high five	
apláy	apply	maglagáy (the act of putting to use or putting one thing to another), isabuhay (to put into practice), gumawa ng aplikasyón (to make an application for) (aplikasyon = Sp. aplicación), mamasukan
áplikánt	applicant	aplikante (Sp. aplicante), namamasukan
áprikót	apricot	
arkipélagó	archipelago	kapuluán
ármaláyt	(from “Armalite”) assault rifle	ripleng pansalakay (riple = Sp. rifle)
armi	army	hukbô, militar (Sp.)
asaynment	assignment	takdáng-aralín
atak	attack	salakay, pagsalakay, atake(Sp. ataque)
atorni	attorney	abogado (Sp.)
aysing	icing/frosting	
ayskrim	ice cream	sorbetes (Sp. sorbete)
babay	bye-bye	paalam
bádigárd	bodyguard	bantáy, tagabantay, tagapagbantay
bádmintón	badminton	
badtrip	(from “bad trip”) annoyed	inís, buwisit, asár (Sp.), adwâ
badyet	budget	gastos (Sp. gasto), gugulín, laáng-gugulin
bag	bag	bayóng, supot (paper or plastic bag), buslô
baks-opis	box office	takilya (Sp. taquilla), pinilákang-tabing
bakwít	evacuee	(mga) lumikas, lumisan, umibayo
baléy	ballet	
báliból/bóliból	volleyball	
ban	ban	bawal, Hindi puwede (puwede = Sp. puede), pagbabawal, prohibisyón (Sp. prohibicion), pinagbabawal
ban/van	van	purgoneta (Sp. furgoneta), sasakyan, FX
bandyo	banjo	banyo (Sp.)
bar	bar (business selling alcoholic drinks)	bahay-inuman, taberna (Sp.)
baráyti	variety	pagkakaiba-iba, kasarián, sári-sarì
barbekyú/barbikyú	barbecue	ihaw (literally “grilling”), inihaw, inasál
barbel	barbell/dumbbell	
barker	barker	tagatawag ng pasahero (pasahero = Sp. pasajero)
barók	Baroque	
bártendér	bartender	tagapaglingkod (ng alak),
báryabol	variable	
báryant	variant	kaanyo, anyô
basket	basket	sisidlán, buslô
básketból	basketball	
basted	busted (turned down in a romantic relationship)	wasák ang pusò, tinanggihan
basuka	bazooka	
batón	baton (staff or truncheon)	batutà (Sp.), bótong
bekon	bacon	tosino (Sp. tocino)
bertdey	birthday	kaarawán, kapanganakan
bes/beshie/bespren	best friend	kaibigan, matalik na kaibigan
besbol/beysbol	baseball	
bétsin	(from "Tien Chun Ve-Tsin") monosodium glutamate	pampalasa
beybi	baby (affectionate term for a loved one)	mahál (Sans. महार्घ mahārgha), írog, íbig, sintá (Sans. चिन्ता cintā), palangga
bidyo	video	panoorin, bideo (Sp. vídeo), palabás
bidyoke	(from "videoke") karaoke	
bikini	bikini; swimsuit	
bílbord	billboard	
bílding	building	gusalì, estruktura (Sp. estructura)
bilíb	believe (impressed)	hangà, tiwalà, bighanì
bilyard	billiard	bilyár (Sp. billar)
bisi	busy	abala, may ginagawa, maraming ginagawâ
biskuwít	biscuit	tinapay
bip-stik	beef steak	bisték (Sp. bistec)
blakbord	blackboard, chalkboard	pisara (Sp. pizarra)
bláter	police blotter	pagpaparehistro ng sumbong sa pulisya (rehistro = Sp. registro, pulisya = Sp. policía)
bodabíl	vaudeville	
bodka	vodka	
boksing	boxing	
bold	(from "bold") naked	hubad, tiwangwang, hubôt hubad, hubô
boling	bowling	
bolpen	ballpoint pen	panulat (any writing instrument that uses ink), pluma (Sp.), pangkatat
boo	boo; to dislike	ayawan
bos	boss	punò, pinuno, hepe (Sp. jefe), namumunò
boykot	boycott	
brandi	brandy	
bra/brasiyér	brassiere	
brawnawt	from ("brownout") power outage	pagkawala ng koryente (koryente = Sp. corriente), madilím áng paligid
brip	briefs	panloob na panlalaki, panloob ng lalaki, salawál
brodkast	broadcast	pagsasahimpapawid
brodkaster	broadcaster	tagapagbalita, tagapagsahimpapawid
brokoli	broccoli	brekol (Sp. brécol)
buldoser	bulldozer	pamungkal-sudsod
bumerang	boomerang	
bus	bus	
daspan	dustpan	pandakót
daster	duster (loose dress)	
dayagram	diagram	balangkas, banghay, danháy
dáyapér	diaper	lampín
dedbol	(from "dead ball") dead	nasawi, patáy, pumanaw, sumalangit, yumao, sumakabilang-buhay
detéktib	detective	tiktík
dígri	degree (temperature)	grádo (Sp. grado), init
dísko/diskotek	discotheque	sayáwan, walwálan
dispátser	dispatcher	despatsadór (Sp. despachador)
dóbol-ded	double-dead meat	botsà, puksang-puksang karne
donat	doughnut	bitso-bitsong bilog
dram	drum (a large cylindrical container)	
drayber	driver	tsupér (Sp. chofer), nagmamaneho
dribol	dribble (basketball)	pagpapatalbóg, patalbúgin, pinatalbóg
drowing	drawing	guhit
dyaket	jacket	
dyakpat	jackpot	pinakamalaking premyo (premyo = Sp. premio)
dyambol	jump ball (basketball)	pagsimula ng laro
dyanitor	janitor	tagalinis, tagapaglinis
dyas	jazz	tugtóg
dyéneréytor	generator	
dyinggel	(from “jingle”) peeing	ihi, pag-iihi
dyip/dyipni	jeep/jeepney	
dyudo	judo	
eksit	exit	labas, labasan
elebeytor	elevator; lift	
ensayklopidya	encyclopedia	talaalaman, talarunungan
entri	entry (record listed in a log, diary, website, etc.)	lahók
epek	effect	bisà, bunga, epékto (Sp. efecto), damay
erkon/erkondisyoner	air conditioner	pampalamíg ng silíd
ertkweyk	earthquake	lindol, paggalaw ng lupa, pagyayanig
eskaleytor	escalator	
five-six/payb-siks	(from "five-six") (moneylending scheme commonly associated to Indians)	pagpapautang ng pera, pagpapahirám
gadyet	gadget	kagamitán, aparato (Sp.)
gang	criminal gang	barkadahang kriminal (barkada = Sp. barcada & kriminal = Sp. criminal)
gambol	gamble	pagsusugal (sugal = Sp. jugar)
geym	(from "game") ready	handâ
gimik	gimmick	pakulô, pakanâ, pakuwela (kuwela = Sp. chulear)
golp	golf	
gradweyt	graduate	tapós (sa pag-aaral), nagtapós (ng pag-aaral)
grawnded	grounded (confined to one's room for misbehaving)	báwal, pinagbáwalan
groser	grocer	
gróserí	grocery	
hani	honey	pulót
haló	hello	kumustá (Sp, cómo está), Úy!
hamster	hamster	
hanger	hanger	pansampáy, panampáy
hap islip	half slip; underskirt	pang-ilalim ná saya
hardel	hurdle	luksuhang-hadlang, hadlang, harang, balakid
hasel	hassle; bothersome	nakaiinis
hatdog	hot dog	longganisa (Sp. longaniza)
hay	high (drugged)	sabóg, baság, bogsa
hayblad	(from "high blood") hypertension	altapresyon (Sp. alta presión)
háyskúl	high school	paaraláng sekundarya (sekundarya = Sp. secundaria); mataás na paaralán
haywey	highway	kalsada (Sp. calzada), pangunahing lansangan
helikopter/helikapter	helicopter	
hóldap/holdáper	(from "hold-up" or "hold-upper) kidnapper, mugger, robber	maglilíngo, mágnanákaw, mandurukot
holen	(from "hole in") marble	
holwey	hallway; corridor	pasilyo (Sp. pasillo)
ínterbiyú	interview	panayám
iskedyul	schedule	talaorasán (oras = Sp. horas), talatakdaan
iskert	skirt	palda (Sp. falda), saya
iskolar	scholar	
iskór	score	marka (Sp. marca), puntos (Sp. punto)
iskúl	school	paaralán, eskuwela (Sp. escuela)
iskríp	script	sulat (handwritten texts or characters)
iskrín	screen	tabing
iskuter	scooter	
iskuwater	squatter	(mga) taong naninirahan sa lupà ng iba, (mga) taong nagtitira sa lupa ng iba, (mga) taong naninirahan sa lupang Hindi sila may-ari, (mga) taong nagtitira sa lupang Hindi sila may-ari,
iskrambol	ice scramble	
iskuwirel	squirrel	buot
islogan	slogan	bansag
isnáb	snob	di-namamansín
isnak	snack	meryenda (Sp. merienda)
ispayral	spiral	anyong-suso, ikid, likaw, pilipit, paikid, paikót, palibot-libot
ispeling	spelling	pagkabaybay
ispiker	speaker (person)	tagapagsalitâ, tagatalumpatì, mananalita, mananalumpatì
isponsor	sponsor	tagatangkilik, tagataguyod
ispórt	sport	palarô, palakasan, paligsahan (also translates as “contest” or “tournament”), deporte (Sp.)
ispréy	spray	wisík
istak	stock (supply)	panustos, ipon, tágô
istandard	standard	pamantayan, panukatan, norma (Sp.), huwaran
istroberi	strawberry	presas (Sp. fresa)
isyu	issue (controversial topic)	kontrobérsiyá (Sp. controversia), probléma (Sp. problema, problems or concerns), súliránin, usapín
kabinet	cabinet	aparadór (Sp.), damitan
kambas	canvass	pagbibiláng ng boto (boto = Sp. voto)
kantin	canteen	kainan, kantina (Sp. cantina)
kápiráyt/kopirayt	copyright	karapatáng-sipì, karapatang may-ari, karapatang-akda
karat	carat	kilates (Sp. quilate)
karot/kerot	carrot	
karpet	carpet	
kas	cash	pera, salapi, suki, datong
kaswalti	casualty (person suffering from injuries or who has been killed due to an accident or through an act of violence)	biktima (Sp. victima), pinatáy
kendi	candy	minatamís
ketsap	ketchup	
keyk	cake	pastél (Sp.)
kibord	keyboard	tipaan
klip	clip	ipit, pang-ipit, sipit
koboy	cowboy	
kodak	Kodak	
kolektor	collector	maniningíl
komonwelt	commonwealth	malasariling pamahalaan, sampamahalaan
kompyuter	computer	ordenadór (Sp.)
kondom	condom	
kolek	collect	pag-iipon, pagtitipon, pagkokolekta (kolekta = Sp. colectar)
korék	correct	ayos, tamâ, tumpák, wasto
kras	crash	bumagsák, banggaan, lagpakan, salpúkan
kudeta	coup d'état	pagtatalsik sa pamahalaan
kukis	cookies	
kyut	cute	guwápo (m) & guwápa (f) (Sp. guapo & guapa), marikít
lawd-ispiker	loud speaker	palakas-tinig, daktining
lebel	level	antás
leybel	label	pangalan, banság, tawag
leysi	lazy	tamad
lobat	low battery	mababang bateryá (baterya = Sp. batería)
madyik	magic	salamangka (Sp. salamanca), mahika
mágasín	magazine	diyaryo (Sp. diario)
manikin	mannequin	tau-tauhan, maoy
maws	computer mouse	
miskol	missed call	hindî nasagutáng tawag
miting	meeting	pulong, pagpupulong
mol/mall	shopping mall	pámilíhan, puntahan, lakwatsahan
nars	nurse	tagapagsilbí, tagapangalaga
notbuk	note book	
okey	OK, okay	sige (Sp. sigue)
opis	office	opisina (Sp. oficina), tanggapan
pakshet/paksyet	fuckshit (obnoxious person)	gago (Sp.), loko (Sp. loco)
pakyu	fuck you	putang iná mo (puta = Sp.)
panti	panties	panloob na pambabae, panloob ng babae
pasword	password	senyas (Sp. señas)
peke	fake	huwad, Hindi totoo
perstaym	first time	unang beses (una = Sp. & beses = Sp. vez)
pesbuk/peysbuk	Facebook	
piktsur	picture	larawan, imahen (Sp. imagen), litrato (Sp.)
plais	pliers	bokay-pato, sagam, alikate (Sp. alicate)
plaslayt	flashlight	lente (Sp.)
plastik	plastic	supot
playwud	plywood	tablasusón (tabla = Sp.)
pontempen	fountain pen	
potobam	photobomb	pagsingit sa mga larawan
pulís	police	pulisya (Sp. policía), magbantáy, bantayán, tagabantay, tagapagbantay
putbol/futbol	football	
rali	rally	martsa (Sp. marcha), pagtulungán, pakikibaka, paglusob
repridyeretor/ref	refrigerator	palamigan
rebyu/ribyu	review	balik-aral, pagbabalik-aral
reispeling	respelling	pagbaybay ulit
rises	recess (education)	duyo
robot	robot	
salayba	saliva	laway
sámpol	sample	halimbawà, muwestra (Sp. muestra)
sandwits	sandwich	pinalamanáng tinapay
sarbey	survey	pagsusuri
simple	simple	payak
selpon	cellphone	teléponó (Sp. teléfono)
sori	sorry	patáwad, paumanhín, pasénsiyá na (pasénsiyá = Sp. paciencia)
supermarket	supermarket	palengke, (Sp. palenque), merkado (Sp. mercado)
suplay	supply	panustos
suplayer	supplier	tagapagtustos
syota/shota	short time/shawty	kasintahan, nobyo (m) (Sp. novio) & nobya (f) (Sp. novia)
tambay	stand by	pag-aansikot, paglalakwatsa (lakwatsa = Sp. la cuacha)
trapik	traffic	trápikó (Sp. tráfico)
teksbuk	textbook	aklat pampaaralan, aralang aklat, aklat-aralin
tenis	tennis	
tin-edyer	teenager	lalabintaunin, lalabinggulang
titser	teacher	tagapagturo, gurò (Sans. via Malay guru), maestro (m) and maestra (f) (Sp.)
tisyert	T-shirt	baro, damit
tisyu	tissue	lamuymoy, himaymay
tráysikél	tricycle	
trak	truck	
trey	tray	
tsek	check, checkmark, tick (symbol)	gurlit, pampigil
tsekmeyt	checkmate (chess)	pagkakatalo sa larô
tses	chess	
wais	wise	mautak, tuso, marunong
websayt	website	pook-sapot
weder	weather	panahon
yunit	unit	batayang sukat, pangkat, sambilang, sukat

== Malay ==
Many Malay loanwords entered the Tagalog vocabulary during pre-colonial times as Old Malay became the lingua franca of trade, commerce and diplomatic relations during the pre-colonial era of Philippine history as evidenced by the Laguna Copperplate Inscription of 900 AD and accounts of Antonio Pigafetta at the time of the Spanish arrival in the country five centuries later. Some Malay loanwords, such as bansa and guro (which in turn came from Sanskrit; see below), were later additions to the Tagalog language during the first half of the 20th century. Said words were proposals by the late linguist Eusebio T. Daluz to be adopted for further development of the Tagalog language and eventually found widespread usage among the lettered segment of the Tagalog-speaking population.

Tagalog	Etymology	Meaning in Tagalog
balaklaot	barat laut (Malay, “northwest”)	northwestern winds
balisâ	belisah (Malay, meaning “restless; fidgety”)	restless; fidgety
batubalanì	batu (Malay and Tagalog, “stone”) + berani (Malay, “brave”)	magnetite; magnet stone
bibingka	kuih bingka (Malay, “tapioca or cassava cake”)	rice cake with coconut milk
binibini	bini-bini (Brunei Malay, “woman”)	young lady; miss
bunsô	bongsu (Malay, “youngest-born”)	youngest child
buro	budu (pickled fish)	pickling (with salt and brine)
dalamhatì	dalam (Malay, “within”) + hati (Malay, “liver; heart”)	grief
dalirì	jeriji(finger, toe)	finger, toe
dalubhasà	juru (Malay, “expert”) + bahasa (Malay, “language”)	expert (in general)
duryán	duri ("thorn") + an	durian fruit
garà	gahara (from royal origin)	elegance in clothing
hatol	hatur (Malay, “order; arrangement”)	sentence pronounced by a judge in court
kanan	kanan (Malay, “right”)	right-hand side
karáng	karang (coral, limestone)	coral (reef)
kawal	kawal (Malay, “watchman; patrol; guard”)	soldier; warrior
kulambô	kelambu (Malay, “mosquito net”)	mosquito net
lagarì	gergaji (Malay, “carpenter's saw”)	carpenter's saw
lunggatî	lung (Tagalog root word meaning “grief”) + hati (Malay, “liver; heart”)	eagerness; ambition
luwalhatì	luar (Malay, “outside”) + hati (Malay, “liver; heart”)	inner peace; glory (as in the Glory Be)
mura	murah	cheap
pighatî	pedih (Malay, “pain”) + hati (Malay, “liver; heart”)	affliction; anguish; sorrow; woe
pilak	perak (Malay ultimately of Khmer origin, “silver”)	silver (Ag)
piralî	pijar (Malay, “borax”)	calcium carbonate
rambután	rambut ("hair") + an	rambutan
salaghatì	salag or salak (Tagalog, “full and levelled”) + hati (Malay, “liver; heart”)	displeasure; resentment
Singapura	Singapura (Malay, "Singapore")	Singapore
takal	takar (Malay, “measure of capacity for oil, etc.”)	measurement by volume of liquids and of grains
tanghalì	tengah (Malay, “half”) + hari (Malay, “day”)	noon; midday
tiyanak	puntianak (Malay, referring to a vampire, ghost or reanimated body supposed to suck blood)	vampiric creature that imitates the form of a child
uluhatì	ulo (Tagalog, “head”) + hati (Malay, “liver”)	remembrance; reminiscence
usap	ucap (Malay, “utterance”)	conversation

The term bahagharì is commonly believed to be a compound word of bahág, "loincloth", and harì, "king", however some linguists have alternative suggestions where the latter component may be from hari, Malay word for "day", according to Wolff (1976), or from Sanskrit हरि hari, meaning "sun", according to Potet (2016).

== Sanskrit ==
Jean Paul-Potet estimates that there are around 280 words in Tagalog that originated from Sanskrit. As in most Austronesian languages, the Sanskrit vocabulary incorporated into Tagalog were mostly borrowed indirectly via Malay or Javanese. While it was generally believed that Malay played a key role in the dissemination of the Indian lexical influences in Southeast Asia, there are also cases of words that are not attested in Old Malay but are present in Old Javanese, thus highlighting the possibility that the latter played a more important role in the dissemination of these words in Maritime Southeast Asia than was previously given credit for. Examples of such words that also reached the Philippines include anluwagi ("carpenter"; from Javanese uṇḍahagi meaning "woodworker" or "carpenter") and gusali ("building"; from Javanese gusali meaning "blacksmith"). As these words are more closely related to their Middle Indo-Aryan counterparts, they are not listed below.

Tagalog	Sanskrit	Meaning in Tagalog
aghám	आगम (āgama, “acquisition of knowledge, science”)	science (modern coinage)
antalà	अन्तर (āntara, “duration, gap”)	delay
asal	आचार (ācāra, “manner of action, conduct, behavior”)	behaviour; character
bahalà	भार (bhāra, “burden, load, weight, heavy work”)	to manage; to take care of; to take charge
balità	वार्त्ता (vārttā, “account, report”)	news
bansâ	वंश (vaṃśá, “bamboo cane, genealogy, dynasty, race”) via Malay bangsa	country (modern coinage)
banyagà	वाणिज्यक (vāṇijyaka, “merchant, trader”)	foreigner (modern meaning)
basa	वाचा (vācā, “voice, speech”)	to read
bathalà	भट्टार (bhaṭṭāra, “noble lord, venerable”)	Supreme Being; God
bihasa	अभ्यास (abhyāsa, “habit”)	expert; accustomed
budhî	बुद्धि (buddhi, “understanding”)	conscience
dawà	यव (yava, “Hordeum vulgare”)	Panicum miliaceum
dayà	द्वय (dvaya, “twofold nature, falsehood”)	cheating; deception
diwà	जीव (jīva, “the principle of life, vital breath”)	spirit; soul
diwatà	देवता (devatā, “divinity”)	fairy, goddess, nymph
dukhâ	दुःख (duḥkha, “sorrow, misery, hardship”)	poverty
dusa	दोष (doṣa, “harm, damage, bad consequence”)	suffering
dustá	दूषित (dūṣita, “defiled, violated, injured”)	ignominiously insulted
gadyâ	गज (gaja, “elephant”)	elephant
gandá	गन्ध (gandha, “aroma, fragrance”)	beauty; beautiful
gurò	गुरु (guru, “master, teacher”) via Malay guru	mentor; teacher
halagá	अर्घ (argha, “value”)	price; value; worth
halatâ	अर्थय (arthaya, “perceive”)	noticeable; perceptible; obvious
harayà	हृदय (hṛdaya, “heart”)	imagination
hinà	हीन (hīna, “weaker/lower than, abandoned, deficient”)	weakness; fragility
hiwagà	विहग (vihaga, “bird”)	mystery; miracle
kasubhâ	कुसुम्भ (kusumbha, “Carthamus tinctorius”)	Carthamus tinctorius
kastulì	कस्तूरी (kastūrī, “Abelmoschus moschatus”)	Abelmoschus moschatus
kathâ	कथा (kathā, “a feigned story, fable”)	literary composition; fiction; invention
katâ-katâ	Reduplication of कथा (kathā, “story, fable”)	legend; fable; folk tale
kalapati; palapati	पारापत (pārāpata, “pigeon”)	pigeon
kéndi	खण्ड (khanda, “sugar”)	candy
kubà	कुब्ज (kubja, “hunchback”)	hunchback
kutà	कोट (koṭa, “fort, stronghold”) via Malay kota	fort
ladyâ	राज (rāja, “king, chief, sovereign”)	Raja
lagundî	निर्गुण्डी (nirguṇḍī, “Vitex negundo”)	Vitex negundo
lahò	राहु (rāhu, “Rāhu”)	eclipse; to vanish
lasa	रस (rasa, “taste, savour”)	taste
likhâ	लेखा (lekhā, “drawing, figure”)	to create
madlâ	मण्डल (maṇḍala, “circle, multitude”)	the general public
maharlikâ	महर्द्धिक (maharddhika, “prosperous”)	nobility; prehispanic Tagalog social class composed of freedmen
maharani	महाराज्ञी (mahārājñī), from महा (mahā, “great”) + रानी (rājñī, “queen”) via Malay maharani	great queen
makatà	Tagalog prefix ma- + Sanskrit कथा (kathā, “story, fable”)	poet
mukhâ	मुख (mukha, “face”)	face
mulâ	मूल (mūla, “basis, foundation, origin, beginning”)	from; since; origin
mutyâ	मुत्य (mutya, “pearl”)	amulet; charm; jewel; pearl
naga	नाग (nāga, “serpent”)	dragon
paksâ	पक्ष (pakṣa, “a point or matter under discussion”)	theme; topic; subject
palibhasà	परिभाषा (paribhāṣā, “speech, censure, reproof”)	irony; sarcasm; criticism; because (as an adverb)
parusa	Tagalog prefix pa- + dusa, from Sanskrit दोष (doṣa)	punishment
patola	पटोल (paṭola, “Trichosanthes dioica”)	Luffa acutangula
raha	राज (rāja, “king or royal”, via Spanish)	king / royal (historical)
saksí	साक्षी (sākṣī, “eye-witness”)	witness
sakunâ	शकुन (śakuna, “a bird of omen”)	disaster
salamuhà	समूह (samūha, “gathering, crowd”)	to mingle with people
salantâ	श्रान्त (śrānta, “maimed, crippled”)	infirm
salitâ	चरित (carita, “behaviour, acts, deeds, adventures”)	to speak; to talk; word
samantalà	समान्तर (samāntara, “parallel”)	meanwhile
sampalataya	सम्प्रत्यय (sampratyaya, “trust, confidence”)	to have faith, to believe in God
sandata	संयत्त (saṃyatta, “prepared, being on one's guard”)	weapon
siglá	शीघ्र (śīghra, “swift, quick, speedy”)	enthusiasm; vitality
sintá	चिन्ता (cintā, “thought”) via Malay cinta	love
sukà	चुक्र (cukra, “vinegar”)	vinegar
sutlâ	सूत्र (sūtra, “thread, string, wire”)	silk
talà	तारा (tārā, “star”)	star, Tala (goddess)
tanikalâ	शृङ्खल (śṛṅkhala, “chain”)	chain
tinggâ	तीव्र (tīvra, “tin, iron, steel”)	tin
tsampaka	चम्पक (campaka, “Magnolia champaca”)	Magnolia champaca
upang	उप (upa, “towards, near to”)	so as to, in order to

== Tamil ==
Close contact through commercial networks between India and Maritime Southeast Asia for more than two millennia, bolstered by the establishment of Tamil as a literary language in India starting from the 9th century, allowed the spread of Dravidian loanwords in several local languages of Southeast Asia, including Old Malay and Tagalog. A list of Tagalog words with Tamil origins are shown below.

Tagalog	Tamil	Meaning in Tamil	Meaning in Tagalog
bagay	வகை (vakai)	kind, class, sort; goods; property; means of livelihood	thing; object; article
baríl	வெடில் (veṭil) via Malay bedil	explosion	gun; to shoot (with a gun)
bilanggô	விலங்கு (vilaṅku)	fetters; shackles; manacles	captive; prisoner
gulay	குழை (kuḻai)	to become soft, pulpy, as well-cooked	vegetable
kalikam	காரிக்கம் (kārikkam)	unbleached plain cotton cloth	embroidered breeches from Brunei
karé-karé	kari-kaari, derived from a reduplication of கறி (kari), possibly via Malay kari(-kari)	curry	local version of curry containing beef and peanut sauce
kawal	காவல் (kāval)	watchman; guard	soldier; warrior
kawalì	குவளை (kuvaḷai)	wide-mouthed vessel; cup	frying pan, skillet
kiyapò	கயப்பூ (kayappū)	aquatic flower	Pistia stratiotes
manggá	மாங்காய் (māṅkāy)	unripe mango fruit	mango (in general)
malunggáy	முருங்கை (muruṅkai)	Moringa oleifera	Moringa oleifera
misáy	மீசை (mīcai)	moustache	moustache
palisay	பரிசை (paricai)	shield; buckler	shield used in warrior dances
puto	புட்டு (puṭṭu)	a kind of confectionery	rice cake
tupa	ஆட்டுப்பட்டி (āṭṭuppaṭṭi)	a flock of sheep	sheep

== Arabic and Persian ==
There are very few words in Tagalog that are identified as Arabic or Persian in origin, but some of them are very frequently use terms such as “salamat,” meaning “thank you.” According to Jean-Paul Potet, there are 60 Tagalog words that are identified with reasonable confidence as derived from Arabic or Persian, half of which are probably (roughly 23%) or unquestionably (roughly 26%) borrowed indirectly through Malay. The other half of the identified loanwords are directly derived from Arabic or Persian. The table below shows different Arabic loanwords, including archaic and poetic ones, incorporated into the Tagalog lexicon. If an Arabic loanword is considered to be borrowed through the mediation of Malay, the intermediate Malay term is also specified. Some recent Malay loanwords that were later additions to Tagalog proposed by Eusebio T. Daluz even derived from Arabic and Persian.

Several Spanish loanwords incorporated into Tagalog have origins in the Arabic language. Examples include alahas (meaning jewel, from Sp. alhaja and ultimately from Arabic الْحَاجَة, al-ḥāja, “the necessary or valuable thing”), albayalde (meaning white lead, from Sp. albayalde and ultimately from Arabic الْبَيَاض, al-bayāḍ, meaning "white" or "whiteness"), alkansiya (meaning piggy bank, from Sp. alcancía and ultimately from Arabic كَنْز, kanz, meaning "treasure"), alkatsopas (meaning artichoke, from Sp. alcachofa and ultimately from Arabic الخُرْشُوف, al-ḵuršūf), almires (meaning small mortar, from Sp. almirez and ultimately from Arabic المِهْرَاس, al-mihrās), asapran (meaning saffron, from Sp. azafrán from Arabic اَلزَّعْفَرَان, az-zaʽfarān), baryo (meaning village, from Sp. barrio and ultimately from Arabic بَرِّيّ , barriyy), kapre (a Filipino mythological creature, from Sp. cafre and ultimately from Arabic كَافِر, kāfir), kisame (meaning ceiling, from Sp. zaquizamí and ultimately from Arabic سَقْف فِي اَلْسَمَاء, saqf fī l-samāʼ, meaning "ceiling in the sky"), etc. The table below does not include these numerous Hispano-Arabic terms as it will only focus on those loanwords which are directly borrowed from Arabic or Persian, or indirectly borrowed through Malay.

Tagalog	Arabic/Persian	Malay intermediate	Meaning in Tagalog
agimat	Arabic عَزِيمَة (ʽazīma, “amulet, talisman, magic spell”)	azimat (“talisman”)	amulet; talisman
alak	Arabic عَرَق (ʽaraq, “liquor”)	arak (“liquor”)	liquor
anakura	Persian ناخدا (nāxuḏā, “ship's captain”)	nakhoda (“ship's captain”)	ship's captain
daulat	Arabic دَوْلَة (dawla, “rotation, turn of fortune”)	daulat (“prosperity, happiness”)	good fortune
hukóm	Arabic حُكْم (ḥukm, “judgment”)	hukum (“judgment, law”)	judge
katan	Arabic خَتْن (ḵatn, “circumcision”)	khatan (“circumcision”)	circumcised
kupyâ	Arabic كُوفِيَّة (kūfiyya, “headgear, keffiyeh”)	kopiah (“cap”)	iron helmet or similar headgear
malim	Arabic مُعَلِّم (muʽallim, “teacher; navigator”)	malim (“maritime pilot; expert”)	maritime pilot
mansigit	Arabic مَسْجِد (masjid, “mosque”)		temple, worship place
paham	Arabic فَهْم (fahm, “understanding”)	faham (“science, understanding”)	a learned person; scholar
pangadyî	Tag. pang- + Arabic حَجِّي (ḥajjī, “pilgrim to Mecca”)	pengajian (“recitation, reading”)	Muslim prayer; prayer to a Tagalog deity
pinggán	Persian پنگان (pingān, “cup, bowl”)	pinggan (“dish, plate, saucer”)	dish plate
salabát	Arabic شَرْبَة (šarba, “any non-alcoholic drink”)		ginger tea
salamat	Persian سَلَامَت (salāmat, “good health”), from Arabic سَلَامَة, (salāma, “peace; blessings”, greeting or thanking word)		thank you
salapî	Arabic صَرْف (ṣarf, “to pay, to earn”)		coin; money
salawál	Persian شلوار (šalvār, “bloomers, pantaloons, trousers”)	seluar (“breeches, trousers”)	underpants; pre-colonial, usually knee-length, pair of trousers
siyák	Arabic شَيْخ (šayḵ, “elder, master, teacher, sheik”)	syeikh (“a mosque caretaker”)	Muslim cleric
sultán	Arabic سُلْطَان (sulṭān, “strength sorveignty or authority”)	sultan (“king or royal”)	king or royal (historical)
sumbali	Arabic بِاسْمِ اللّٰه (bismi llāh, “in the name of God”)	sembelih (“butcher an animal”)	cutting the throat of an animal
sunát	Arabic سُنَّة (sunna, “tradition, specifically Islamic traditions”)	sunat (“circumcision”)	excision of the clitoris

The absence of traces of Arabic names of calendar, precisely Muslim names of months, days of the week, and of daily prayer times proves that Manila Tagalog Muslims are only nominal, i.e. not deeply Islamized, as the calendar names are important to practicing Muslims. 3 Islamic calendar terms did occur in the Kingdom of Bonbon (present-day Batangas), but cannot be retained as influence, as they did not enter in reference dictionaries, so they must have been borrowed recently from Muslim informants from Mindanao; the legend was narrated by certain Sergio S. Coronel who heard it from old people living around the volcanic lake Taal and was recorded by folklorist Alfonso P. Santos.

Tagalog	Arabic	Malay intermediate	Meaning
Itsín	الاِثْنَيْن (al-Ithnayn)	Isnéin	Monday
Ramadlán	Ramaḍlān (Old Arabic or Classical Arabic form)	Ramedlán	Ramaḍān (رَمَضَان)
Sapár	صَفَر (Ṣafar)	Sapár	Ṣafar

== Hokkien ==
Most Chinese loanwords in Tagalog were derived from Hokkien, the Southern Chinese language most widely spoken in the Philippines. Most of the 163 Hokkien-derived terms collected and analyzed by Gloria Chan-Yap are fairly recent and do not appear in the earliest Spanish dictionaries of Tagalog. Many loanwords such as pancit entered the Tagalog vocabulary during the Spanish colonial era when the Philippines experienced an increased influx of Chinese immigrants (mostly from the provinces of Fujian and Guangdong in Southern China) as Manila became an international entrepôt with the flourishing of the Manila-Acapulco Galleon Trade. Attractive economic opportunities boosted Chinese immigration to Spanish Manila and the new Chinese settlers brought with them their skills, culinary traditions and language, with the latter then influencing the native languages of the Philippines in the form of loanwords, most of which are related to cookery.

Tagalog	Hokkien	Meaning in Hokkien	Meaning in Tagalog
angkák	紅麴 (âng-khak)	red yeast rice	red yeast rice
apyán	鴉片 (a-phiàn)	opium	opium
ate	阿姊 (á-ché)	appellation for elder sister	appellation for elder sister
baktáw	墨斗 (ba̍k-táu)	carpenter's ink marker	carpenter's ink marker
bakyâ	木屐 (ba̍k-kiah)	wooden clogs	wooden clogs
bataw	肉豆 (bah-tāu)	hyacinth bean (Lablab purpureus)	hyacinth bean (Lablab purpureus)
batsoy	肉碎 (bah-chhùi)	dish with loin of pork as main ingredient	batchoy
bihon	米粉 (bí-hún)	rice vermicelli	rice vermicelli
biko	米糕 (bí-ko)	sweetened rice cake	sweetened rice cake
bilawo	米漏 (bí-lāu)	rice winnower	flat round-shaped rice winnower and food container
bimpo	面布 (bīn-pò͘ )	face towel	face towel
bithay	米篩 (bí-thai)	rice sifter	sieve (for sifting grain and sand)
bitso	米棗 (bí chó)	fried cake made of rice flour	youtiao
betsin	味精 (bī-cheng)	Monosodium glutamate	Monosodium glutamate
buwisit	無衣食 (bô-ui-si̍t)	out of luck, unlucky	nuisance
diko	二哥 (jī-ko)	appellation for second eldest brother	appellation for second eldest brother
disó	二嫂 (jī-só)	second eldest brother's wife	sister-in-law
ditsé	二姊 (jī-ché)	appellation for second eldest sister	appellation for second eldest sister
gintô	金條 (kim-tiâu)	gold bar	gold (Au)
goto	牛肚 (gû-tǒ͘)	ox tripe	goto – rice porridge with ox/beef tripe
gunggóng	戇戇 (gōng-gōng)	stupid	stupid
hikaw	耳鉤 (hǐ-kau)	earrings	earrings
hopya	好餅 (hó piáⁿ)	sweet mung bean cake	sweet mung bean cake
hukbô	服務 (ho̍k-bū)	service	army
husi	富紗 (hù se)	rich yarn	cloth made from pineapple fibre
huwepe	火把 (hóe-pé)	torch	torch
huweteng	花當 (hoe-tǹg)	Jueteng	Jueteng
impó	姆婆 (ḿ-pô) or 引婆 (ín-pô)	grandmother	grandmother
ingkóng	引公 (ín-kong)	grandfather	grandfather
insó	引嫂 (ín-só)	sister-in-law	wife of an elder brother or male cousin
Intsík	引叔 (ín-chek)	uncle	(informal) Chinese people, language, or culture
katay	共伊刣 (kā i thâi)	have it slaughtered	to slaughter
kikyam	雞繭 (ke-kián)	sausage-like roll seasoned with five-spice powder	sausage-like roll seasoned with five-spice powder
kintsáy	芹菜 (khîn-chhài)	celery (Apium graveolens)	celery (Apium graveolens)
kitî	雞稚 (ke-tī)	young chick	young chick
kutsáy	韭菜 (kú-chhài)	Chinese chives (Allium ramosum)	Chinese chives (Allium ramosum)
kusot	鋸屑 (kù-sut)	sawdust	sawdust
kuya	哥仔 (ko-iá)	appellation for elder brother	appellation for elder brother
lawin	老鷹 (lāu-eng)	any bird belonging to Accipitridae or Falconidae	any bird belonging to Accipitridae or Falconidae
lawláw	落落 (làu-làu)	loose	dangling; sagging; hanging loose
litháw	犁頭 (lê-thâu)	plough	ploughshare
lomi	滷麵 (ló͘-mī)	lor mee – Chinese noodle dish	lomi (a Filipino-Chinese noodle dish)
lumpiyâ	潤餅 (lūn-piáⁿ)	fried or fresh spring rolls	fried or fresh spring rolls
mami	肉麵 (mah-mī)	meat and noodles in soup	meat and noodles in soup
maselan	Tagalog ma- + 西人 (se-lâng)	Westerner; Of the Western world	delicate; sensitive; hard to please
miswa	麵線 (mī-soàⁿ)	misua – Chinese salted noodles	very thin variety of salted noodle Misua soup
pansít	扁食 (pán-si̍t)	kneaded food	pancit – any noodle dish
pakyáw	縛繳 (pa̍k-kiáu)	to submit by bundles	wholesale buying
pasláng	拍死人 (phah-sí lāng)	to beat people to death	to kill
petsay	白菜 (pe̍h-chhài)	Napa cabbage (Brassica rapa subsp. pekinensis)	Napa cabbage (Brassica rapa subsp. pekinensis)
pesà	白煠魚 (pe̍h-sa̍h hî)	plain boiled fish	plain boiled fish
pinsé	硼砂 (phêng-se)	borax	borax
puntáw	糞斗 (pùn-táu)	dustpan	dustpan
putháw	斧頭 (pú-thâu)	axe	hatchet; small axe
sampán	舢板 (sam-pán)	Chinese boat; Chinese junk	Chinese boat; Chinese junk
samyô	散藥 (sám io̍h)	to sprinkle medicinal powder	aroma; fragrance; sweet odor
sangko	三哥 (saⁿ-ko)	appellation for third eldest brother	appellation for third eldest brother
sangkî	三紀 (saⁿ-kì)	Chinese star anise (Illicium verum)	Chinese star anise (Illicium verum)
sansé	三姊 (saⁿ-ché)	appellation for third eldest sister	appellation for third eldest sister
singkî	新客 (sin-kheh)	new guest or customer	newcomer; beginner
sitaw	青豆 (chhiⁿ-tāu)	Chinese long bean (Vigna unguiculata subsp. sesquipedalis)	Chinese long bean (Vigna unguiculata subsp. sesquipedalis)
siyaho	姐夫 (chiá-hu)	brother-in-law (elder sister's husband)	husband of an elder sister or female cousin
siyakoy	油炸粿 (iû-cha̍h-kóe)	youtiao	shakoy
siyansí	煎匙 (chian-sî)	kitchen turner	kitchen turner
sotanghon	山東粉 (soaⁿ-tang-hún)	cellophane noodles	cellophane noodles
sukì	主客 (chú-kheh)	special guest	regular customer; patron
sungkî	伸齒 (chhun-khí)	protruding tooth	buck tooth
susì	鎖匙 (só-sî)	key	key
suwahe	沙蝦 (soa-hê)	greasyback shrimp (Metapenaeus ensis)	greasyback shrimp (Metapenaeus ensis)
suyà	衰啊 (soe-a)	expression for "How unlucky!"	disgust
siyokoy	水鬼 (chúi-kúi)	water spirit; water devil	merman
siyomay	燒賣 (sio-mai)	steamed dumpling	shumai / siomai – steamed dumpling
siyopaw	燒包 (sio-pau)	meat-filled steamed bun	siopao – meat-filled steamed bun
tahô	豆腐 (tāu-hū)	tofu	taho
táhuré (var. táhurí)	豆乳 (tāu-jí)	soy milk; fermended bean curd	fermented tofu in soy sauce
tanga	蟲仔 (thâng-á)	little insect/bug/worm	clothes moth
tangláw	燈樓 (teng-lâu)	lamp; lantern; lit. 'light tower'	light
tansô	銅索 (tâng-soh)	copper wire	copper (Cu), bronze
tawsî	豆豉 (tāu-sīⁿ)	beans preserved in soy sauce	beans preserved in soy sauce
timsím (var. tingsím)	燈芯 (teng-sim)	lampwick	lampwick
tinghóy	燈火 (teng-hóe)	wick lamp	wick lamp in glass filled with oil
tikoy	甜粿 (tiⁿ-kóe)	nian gao – sweetened rice cake	Sweetened rice cake
titò	豬肚 (ti-tǒ͘)	pig tripe	pork tito – pig tripe
tiyák	的 (tiak)	true; real	sure; certain
toge	豆芽 (tāu-gê)	bean sprout	bean sprout
tokwa	豆乾 (tāu-koaⁿ)	tofu	tofu
totso	豆油醋魚 (tāu-iû- chhò͘-hî)	fish cooked in soy sauce and vinegar	sautéed fish with tahure
toyò	豆油 (tāu-iû)	soy sauce	soy sauce
tutsang	頭鬃 (thâu-chang)	hair	short hair on a woman's head
upo	葫匏 (ô͘-pû)	bottle gourd (Lagenaria siceraria)	bottle gourd (Lagenaria siceraria)
utaw	烏豆 (o͘-tāu)	black soybean (Glycine max)	soybean (Glycine max)
wansóy (var. unsóy, yansóy)	芫荽 (oân-sui)	coriander/cilantro (Coriandrum sativum)	coriander/cilantro (Coriandrum sativum)

Many Chinese mestizo surnames are even derived from Hokkien, these are shared with Kapampangan:

Surname	Hokkien	Meaning in Hokkien
Dízon	二孫	2nd eldest grandson'
Gózun, Gózon	五孫	5th eldest grandson'
Lácson	六孫	'6th eldest grandson'
Pekson	八孫	'8th eldest grandson'
Quezon	郭孫	'strongest grandson'
Sámson	三孫	'3rd eldest grandson'
Síson	四孫	'4th eldest grandson'
Tuázon	太孫	'eldest grandson'

Many Filipino surnames that end with “on”, “son”, and “zon” are of Chinese origin, Hispanized version of 孫 (sun).

== Japanese ==
There are very few Tagalog words that are derived from Japanese. Many of them were introduced as recently as the twentieth century like tansan (bottle cap, from the Japanese 炭酸 which originally means refers to soda and carbonated drinks) and karaoke (from the Japanese カラオケ, literally means "empty orchestra") although there are very few Japanese words that appear in the earliest Spanish dictionaries of Tagalog such as katana (Japanese sword, from the Japanese かたな with the same meaning).

Some Filipino jokes are based on comical reinterpretation of Japanese terms as Tagalog words like for example in the case of otousan (from the Japanese お父さん meaning "father") which is reinterpreted as utusan (meaning "servant" or "maid") in Tagalog. As for the Tagalog word Japayuki, it refers to the Filipino migrants who flocked to Japan starting in the 1980s to work as entertainers and it is a portmanteau of the English word Japan and the Japanese word yuki (or 行き, meaning "going" or "bound to").

Tagalog	Japanese	Meaning in Japanese	Meaning in Tagalog
bonsay	盆栽 (bonsai)	bonsai; miniature potted plant	bonsai; miniature potted plant; (slang) Short in height;
dorobo	泥棒 (dorobō)	thief; burglar; robber	thief; burglar; robber
dyak en poy or jak en poy	じゃん拳ぽん (jankenpon)	rock–paper–scissors game	rock–paper–scissors game
karaoke	カラオケ (karaoke)	karaoke (singing to taped accompaniment)	karaoke (singing to taped accompaniment)
karate	空手 (karate)	karate	karate
katanà	刀 (katana)	katana; a Japanese sword	katana; a Japanese sword
katól	蚊取り線香 (katorisenkō)	mosquito coil; anti-mosquito incense	mosquito coil; anti-mosquito incense
kimono	着物 (kimono)	kimono (or other trad. Japanese clothing)	traditional Philippine blouse made of piña or jusi
kiréy	奇麗 (kirei)	pretty; lovely; beautiful; fair	(slang) pretty; lovely; beautiful; fair
kokang	交換 (kōkan)	exchange; interchange	(slang) exchange; interchange
pampam	ぱんぱん (panpan)	(slang) prostitute (esp. just after WWII)	(slang) prostitute
shabú	シャブ (shabu)	(slang) methamphetamine hydrochloride	methamphetamine hydrochloride
taksan-taksan	沢山 (takusan)	much; many	(slang) much; many
tansan	炭酸 (tansan)	carbonated water	bottle cap
tsunami	津波 (tsunami)	tsunami; tidal wave	tsunami; tidal wave
toto	おとうと (otōto)	younger brother or child	young boy

== Nahuatl ==
Tagalog gained Nahuatl words via Spanish from the Galleon trade with the Viceroyalty of New Spain during the Hispanic era.

Here are some examples:

Tagalog Word	Nahuatl Root Word	Spanish Word	Meaning and Further Comments
Abokado	Ahuacatl	Aguacate	Avocado
Akapulko (var. kapurko)	Acapolco	Acapulco	Senna alata; tropical American medicinal plant
Alpasotis (var. pasotis)	Epazotl	Epazote	Dysphania ambrosioides; South American plant used in herbal tea
Atole	Atolli	Atole	Paste made from flour
Atsuwete	Achiotl	Achiote	Achiote
Guwatsinanggo	Cuauchilnacatl	Guachinango	Shrewd; cunning; astute
Kakaw	Cacáhuatl	Cacao	Cacao
Kakawati (var. kakawate)	Cacáhuatl	Cacahuate	Gliricidia sepium; a tropical legume plant
Kalatsutsi (var. kalanotse)	Cacaloxochitl	Cacalosúchil	Plumeria rubra; a tropical dedicious tree
Kamatis	Xitomatl	Jitomates	Tomato
Kamatsile	Cuamóchitl	Guamúchil	Pithecellobium dulce; a Central American tree in the pea family
Kamote	Camotli	Camote	Sweet potato
Koyote (var. kayote)	Coyotl	Coyote	Coyote
Kulitis	Quilitl	Quelite	Amaranth
Mekate	Mecatl	Mecate	Rope or cord made out of abaca
Mehiko	Mēxihco	Mexico	Mexico
Nanay	Nantli	Nana	Mother
Paruparo(var. paparo)	Papalotl	Papalote	Butterfly
Petate	Petlatl	Petate	Woven palm-matting
Peyote	Peyotl	Peyote	Peyote
Pitaka	Petlacalli	Petaca	Coin purse
Sakate	Zacatl	Zacate	Hay or grass for fodder
Sangkaka	Chiancaca	Chancaca	Cakes of hardened molasses
Sapote	Tzapotl	Zapote	Pouteria sapota; a Latin American fruit tree
Sayote	Chayotli	Chayote	Chayote; a type of Central American gourd
Sili	Chīlli	Chile	Chili pepper
Singkamas	Xicamatl	Jícama	Mexican turnip
Sisiwa	Chichiua	Chichigua	Wet nurse
Tamalis (var. tamales)	Tamalli	Tamal	Rice-based tamales wrapped in banana leaves or corn husks
Tapangko	Tlapanco	Tapanco	Awning
Tatay	Tahtli	Tata	Father
Tisa	Tizatl	Tiza	Chalk
Tiyangge (var. tsangge)	Tianquiztli	Tianguis	Open-air market
Tokayo (var. tukayo, katukayo)	Tocayotia	Tocayo	Namesake
Tsiklet (var. tsikle)	Chictli	Chicle	Chewing gum
Tsiko	Tzicozapotl	Chicozapote	Manilkara zapota; a tropical American evergreen fruit tree
Tsokolate	Xocolatl	Chocolate	Chocolate

== Quechua ==
Tagalog also absorbed Quechua vocabulary, from South America at the Viceroyalty of Peru, especially after Don Sebastián Hurtado de Corcuera former Governor of Panama, imported Peruvian soldiers and settlers to serve in the Philippines.

Tagalog Word	Quechua Root Word	Spanish Word	Meaning and Further Comments
Alpaka	Alpaca	Alpaca	Alpaca, a certain kind of ruminant and its wool
Koka	Coca	Coca	certain bush
Kondor	Condor	Condor	Vultur gryphus
Gautso	Gaucho	Gaucho	"Gaucho, cowboy, herder"
Guwano	Guano	Guano	excrement of sea birds used as manure
Hipihapa	Jipijapa	Jipijapa	Fibre extracted from the leaves of the palm tree to make hats; the hat made of this material.
Pampa	Pampa	Pampa	Prairie
Papas	Papa	Papa	Potato
Kinina	Quinina	Quinina	Quinine, febrifugal substance extracted from the bark of certain trees

== Cebuano ==
Tagalog has loanwords from Cebuano, mostly due to Cebuano and Bisayan migration to Tagalog-speaking regions. Some of these terms refer to concepts that did not previously exist in Tagalog or relate to Cebuano or Bisaya culture; some others have pre-existing equivalents and are introduced to Tagalog by native Cebuano speakers. Some Tagalog slang are of Cebuano provenance (e.g. Tagalog jombag, from Cebuano sumbag).

Tagalog	Cebuano	Meaning in Tagalog	Meaning in Cebuano
bayot	bayot	gay; homosexual man	gay; homosexual man; non-binary; trans woman; coward
buáng, buwáng	buang	crazy; insane; mad	crazy; fool; idiot; hippie
daks	dakô	(slang) having a large penis; well-endowed	big
dugong	dugong	dugong; sea cow	dugong; sea cow
habal-habal	habal-habal	motorcycle taxi	motorcycle taxi (from habal "to copulate")
indáy	inday	a term to address a female housemaid	a young girl
juts	diyutay	(slang) not hung; having a small penis; not well-endowed	small; minute
katarungan	katarongan	justice (coined in the early 20th century by Eusebio T. Daluz)	reason, justification (from tarong "straight; right; proper; just; fair; sane")
kawatán	kawatán	robber; burglar; thief; criminal	robber; burglar; thief (from kawat "to steal; to rob")
kawáy	gawáy	waving of hands; calling someone by waving	tentacles
kuskos-balungos	kuskos balungos	fuss; excessive activity, worry, bother, or talk about something	to scratch, scrape, or rub one's pubic hair
Lumad	lumád	any of the indigenous non-Christian or non-Muslim people of Mindanao	native
lungsód	lungsod	city (introduced during the early 20th century by Eusebio T. Daluz)	town/municipality
tulisán	tulisán	highway robber; brigand; bandit; outlaw	bandit; mugger
ukay-ukay	ukay-ukay	thrift store selling second-hand clothing, shoes and apparel	from ukáy; "to dig/scour"

== Central Bikol ==
Tagalog/Tagálog and Filipino/Filipíno	Central Bikol/Bíkol	Meaning in Central Bikol/Bíkol	Meaning in Tagalog/Tagálog and Filipino/Filipíno
magayon/magayón	magayon	beautiful	beautiful; with beauty; unique in beauty; abundant

== Ilocano ==
Tagalog and Filipino has loanwords from Ilocano, mostly due to Ilocano migration to Tagalog-speaking areas, among other areas of the Philippines with both Filipino-language speakers and Ilocano-language speakers interacting and/or communicating between and/or among each other, including among Ilocano-language speakers who are also Filipino-language speakers, and vice versa for the latter. Some of these terms refer to concepts that did not previously exist in Tagalog and Filipino or relate to Ilocano culture; some others have and are introduced to Tagalog and Filipino by Ilocano-language speakers. Ilocano loaned words to Tagalog dialects of Nueva Ecija and Aurora, where large Ilocano minorities exist, and to the Filipino language for the whole or entire Philippines, especially to the Filipino dialects where Ilocano is also widely spoken whether as a native or first language or not.

Tagalog	Ilocano	Meaning in Ilocano	Meaning in Tagalog
áding	ading	term addressed to a younger sibling or anyone younger than the speaker	an affectionate term for a younger sibling; also used for anyone younger
bagnet	bagnet	deep fried boiled pork belly	deep fried boiled pork belly
bangkíng	bangkíng	lopsided, unbalanced	slanted, not straight
dinengdéng (variant in Filipino: diningdíng)	dinengdeng	Ilocano dish made from vegetables cooked in salt and fish sauce by boiling	a vegetable dish stewed and served with fish and "bagoong/bagoóng" or salted and preserved small fish or very small shrimps; a dish of various vegetables (especially sweet potatoes, eggplants, asparagus or yardlong beans, pumpkins, winged beans, etc.) boiled, mixed with fried or grilled fish, and seasoned with " bagoong/bagoóng" (salted and preserved small fish or very small shrimps)
dugyót	dugyot	dirty to the highest level	pertaining to excessive impurity (especially in humans); small and dirty
pinakbét/pakbét	pinakbet	vegetable stew	a popular Ilocano dish made with vegetables (eggplants, okras or "lady's fingers", bitter melons or bitter gourds, asparagus or yardlong beans, pumpkins, etc.), pork or fish, tomatoes, ginger, and onions, seasoned with "bagoong/bagoóng" or salted and preserved small fish or very small shrimps, with all ingredients cooked at the same time; a dish of various vegetables stewed in tomatoes, a little water, and "bagoong/bagoóng" or salted and preserved small fish or very small shrimps
rabáw	rabaw	surface	the outer part of an object, wherever it is (especially in scientific use); the highest part of anything (especially if there is a flat surface); the highest part of anything; the top or peak place; outer face or part of an object; topmost or uppermost layer or part; any face of a body or object; area or size of the outer part; external appearance as distinct from internal characteristics; in geometry, any two-dimensional figure; a part or all of the boundary of a solid; travel on land and sea, rather than in the air, under water, or underground
tangrib	tangrib	dead coral	dead coral
wagwagan	wagwagan (root word: wagwag)	a thrift store	a thrift store

== Kapampangan ==
Tagalog borrowed words from Kapampangan, as the two languages were spoken in the pre-Hispanic polity of Tondo. Due to heavy borrowing from Kapampangan, Tagalog and Kapampangan were previously thought as closely related languages, although the former is more closely related to Bikol and Bisayan languages, while the latter is more closely related to Sambalic languages. In addition, because of this, Kapampangan may sometimes be perceived as and sound like a distant Central Luzon dialect of Tagalog due to similarities in basic vocabulary. Later on through the official, national, nationwide, and more inclusive Filipino language and beyond only the local to regional Tagalog language mainly and mostly of Central to Southern Luzon, Filipino (and through Filipino's influence, also Tagalog) have and gained more loanwords from Kapampangan, especially from and among the areas of the Philippines with both Filipino-language speakers and Kapampangan-language speakers interacting and/or communicating between and/or among each other, including among Kapampangan-language speakers who are also Filipino-language speakers, and vice versa for the latter. Kapampangan loaned words to Bulacan Tagalog (spoken in Bulacan & Nueva Ecija) & Bataan Tagalog (spoken in Bataan & Zambales), as well as to the Filipino language for the whole or entire Philippines, especially to the Filipino dialects where Kapampangan is also widely spoken whether as a native or first language or not.

Tagalog/Tagálog and Filipino/Filipíno	Kapampangan/Kapampángan	Meaning in Kapampangan/Kapampangán	Meaning in Tagalog/Tagálog and Filipino/Filipíno
bayani	bayani	hero (also borrowed into Pangasinan and Ilocano)	hero
dayami	dayami	rice straw; hay	rice straw; hay
ibon	ébun	egg	bird
ingay	inge	noise	noise
karayom	karayum	needle	needle
mabantot	mabantut	stagnant	stagnant
tayom	tayum	indigo plant (also borrowed into Ilocano)	indigo plant

== See also ==
- Indian influences in early Philippine polities
- Philippine Hokkien
- Spanish language in the Philippines
- Philippine Spanish
- Philippine English
- Taglish
- Bisalog
- Hokaglish
