= Filipino English =

Filipino English may refer to:

- Philippine English, the English language as it is spoken in the Philippines
- Taglish, Tagalog language heavily mixed with American English words
- Bislish, any of the Visayan languages infused with English terms
