= Code-mixing =

Mixing of two languages or varieties in speech

Code-mixing is the mixing of two or more languages or language varieties in speech. (Note: Although this article uses the terms speech and speaking following common practice in linguistics, these descriptions apply equally to signed languages.)

Some scholars use the terms "code-mixing" and "code-switching" interchangeably, especially in studies of syntax, morphology, and other formal aspects of language. Others assume more specific definitions of code-mixing, but these specific definitions may be different in different subfields of linguistics, education theory, communications etc.

Code-mixing is similar to the use or creation of pidgins, but while a pidgin is created across groups that do not share a common language, code-mixing may occur within a multilingual setting where speakers share more than one language.

== As code-switching ==
Some linguists use the terms code-mixing and code-switching more or less interchangeably. Especially in formal studies of syntax, morphology, etc., both terms are used to refer to utterances that draw from elements of two or more grammatical systems. These studies are often interested in the alignment of elements from distinct systems, or on constraints that limit switching.

Some work defines code-mixing as the placing or mixing of various linguistic units (affixes, words, phrases, clauses) from two different grammatical systems within the same sentence and speech context, while code-switching is the placing or mixing of units (words, phrases, sentences) from two codes within the same speech context. The structural difference between code-switching and code-mixing is the position of the altered elements—for code-switching, the modification of the codes occurs between sentences, while for code-mixing, it occurs within them.

In other work the term code-switching emphasizes a multilingual speaker's movement from one grammatical system to another, while the term code-mixing suggests a hybrid form, drawing from distinct grammars. In other words, code-mixing emphasizes the formal aspects of language structures or linguistic competence, while code-switching emphasizes linguistic performance.

While many linguists have worked to describe the difference between code-switching and borrowing of words or phrases, the term code-mixing may be used to encompass both types of language behavior.

== In sociolinguistics ==
While linguists who are primarily interested in the structure or form of code-mixing may have relatively little interest to separate code-mixing from code-switching, some sociolinguists have gone to great lengths to differentiate the two phenomena. For these scholars, code-switching is associated with particular pragmatic effects, discourse functions, or associations with group identity. (Note: See especially Social theories for code-switching.) In this tradition, the terms code-mixing or language alternation are used to describe more stable situations in which multiple languages are used without such pragmatic effects. See also Code-mixing as fused lect, below.

== In language acquisition ==
In studies of bilingual language acquisition, code-mixing refers to a developmental stage during which children mix elements of more than one language. Nearly all bilingual children go through a period in which they move from one language to another without apparent discrimination. This differs from code-switching, which is understood as the socially and grammatically appropriate use of multiple varieties.

Beginning at the babbling stage, young children in bilingual or multilingual environments produce utterances that combine elements of both (or all) of their developing languages. Some linguists suggest that this code-mixing reflects a lack of control or ability to differentiate the languages. Others argue that it is a product of limited vocabulary; very young children may know a word in one language but not in another. More recent studies argue that this early code-mixing is a demonstration of a developing ability to code-switch in socially appropriate ways.

For young bilingual children, code-mixing may be dependent on the linguistic context, cognitive task demands, and interlocutor. Code-mixing may also function to fill gaps in their lexical knowledge. Some forms of code-mixing by young children may indicate risk for language impairment.

== In psychology and psycholinguistics ==
In psychology and in psycholinguistics the label code-mixing is used in theories that draw on studies of language alternation or code-switching to describe the cognitive structures underlying bilingualism. During the 1950s and 1960s, psychologists and linguists treated bilingual speakers as, in Grosjean's terms, "two monolinguals in one person". This "fractional view" supposed that a bilingual speaker carried two separate mental grammars that were more or less identical to the mental grammars of monolinguals and that were ideally kept separate and used separately. Studies since the 1970s, however, have shown that bilinguals regularly combine elements from "separate" languages. These findings have led to studies of code-mixing in psychology and psycholinguistics.

Sridhar and Sridhar define code-mixing as "the transition from using linguistic units (words, phrases, clauses, etc.) of one language to using those of another within a single sentence". They note that this is distinct from code-switching in that it occurs in a single sentence (sometimes known as intrasentential switching) and in that it does not fulfill the pragmatic or discourse-oriented functions described by sociolinguists. (See Code-mixing in sociolinguistics above.) The practice of code-mixing, which draws from competence in two languages at the same time suggests that these competencies are not stored or processed separately. Code-mixing among bilinguals is therefore studied in order to explore the mental structures underlying language abilities.

== As fused lect ==
A mixed language or a fused lect is a relatively stable mixture of two or more languages. What some linguists have described as "codeswitching as unmarked choice" or "frequent codeswitching" has more recently been described as "language mixing", or in the case of the most strictly grammaticalized forms as "fused lects".

In areas where code-switching among two or more languages is very common, it may become normal for words from both languages to be used together in everyday speech. Unlike code-switching, where a switch tends to occur at semantically or sociolinguistically meaningful junctures, (Note: See also Contextualization (sociolinguistics).) this code-mixing has no specific meaning in the local context. A fused lect is identical to a mixed language in terms of semantics and pragmatics, but fused lects allow less variation since they are fully grammaticalized. In other words, there are grammatical structures of the fused lect that determine which source-language elements may occur.

A mixed language is different from a creole language. Creoles are thought to develop from pidgins as they become nativized. Mixed languages develop from situations of code-switching. (See the distinction between code-mixing and pidgin above.)

=== Local names ===
There are many names for specific mixed languages or fused lects. These names are often used facetiously or carry a pejorative sense. Named varieties include the following, among others.

- Benglish
- Bisalog
- Bislish
- Chinglish
- Denglisch
- Dunglish
- Franglais
- Franponais
- Greeklish
- Hinglish
- Hokaglish
- Konglish
- Manglish
- Maltenglish
- Poglish
- Porglish
- Portuñol
- Singlish
- Spanglish
- Svorsk
- Tanglish
- Taglish
- Tenglish
- Turklish
