= Chinese chives =

Chinese chives may refer to:

- Allium tuberosum
- Allium ramosum
