= Turklish =

Hybrid language spoken by Turkish people

Turklish (a portmanteau of "Turkish" and "English") refers to code-mixing or code-switching of Turkish and English. The term was first recorded in 1994.

Turklish is found in Turkish expatriate communities in the United States, Canada, the United Kingdom, New Zealand. Australia, among the students of the many English speaking universities, high schools and corporations of Istanbul and other major cities. To a lesser extent, the same phenomenon can be observed in expatriate communities in Turkey.

At times, English idioms and proverbs are directly translated into Turkish, and vice versa. Also, the gender distinction between English third person pronouns in Turklish is sometimes (though not always) non-existent, a characteristic derived from Turkish, meaning the different pronouns can be used interchangeably.

== Code-switching ==
Turklish speakers borrow a considerable amount of their vocabulary from English while speaking Turkish. It is not uncommon for a speaker of Turklish to frequently switch back and forth between the two languages, sometimes mid-sentence, a practice known as code-switching.

A study of New York City Turkish-English bilinguals found that intra-sentential code-switching was more prevalent that inter-sentential code-switching. Notably, all code-switched sentences retained grammatical rules of either Turkish or English. An example of intra-sentential code-switching can be demonstrated below:

"Yani o da böyle coincidence gibi bir şey." (I mean it was like a coincidence.)

== The role of the Internet ==
Turklish has a long history of being used in online communities. In 2013, Turkish-English memes became popular on X to protest the government, inspired from popular American culture movements. Scholars have hypothesized these English borrowings serve to fill the gaps of new "internet-themed" vocabulary in Turkish. In posts found on X, most of the English words and phrases refer to the webpage, technology and the Internet activity.
