= Bislish =

Mix of Visayan language with English words

Audio example
A man uses Bislish in discussing traffic safety, congestion, and "counterflowing" in Cebu City.

Bislish is a portmanteau of the words Bisaya and English, which refers to any of the Visayan languages of the Philippines macaronically infused with English terms. It is an example of code-mixing. The earliest use of the term Bislish dates from 1999.

An example of Bislish as spoken in Cebuano-speaking areas would be, "Tired na jud (Note: Gyud is pronounced as either [dʒud], [ɡjud], or [ɡud]. In informal communications, it is also occasionally written as g'ud (often gud or jud)) ko my friend, how far pa house nimo?" which means "I am so tired already my friend. How far is your house?". A Bislish example in Hiligaynon-speaking areas is "Lagaw kita at the park, magkit-anay ta sa friends naton didto.", which means "Let's stroll at the park, we'll meet our friends there.

== See also ==
- Pseudo-anglicism
  - Bisalog, Bisaya languages infused with Tagalog.
  - Bisakol, a hybrid language of Bikol and Bisaya.
  - Hokaglish, a mixed language of Philippine Hokkien, Tagalog, and Philippine English
  - Taglish, a mixture language of Tagalog and American English or Philippine English
