= Hokaglish =

Hokkien mixed language of the Philippines

- Philippine Hybrid Hokkien
- 相濫摻話
- Native to: Philippines
- Region: Manila (concentrated in Binondo), Metro Cebu, Metro Bacolod, Iloilo, or elsewhere in the Philippines
- Ethnicity: Chinese Filipinos
- Era: 1945 – present
- Language family: Hokkien mixed language: Hokaglish
- Writing system: none

Language codes
- ISO 639-3: None (mis)
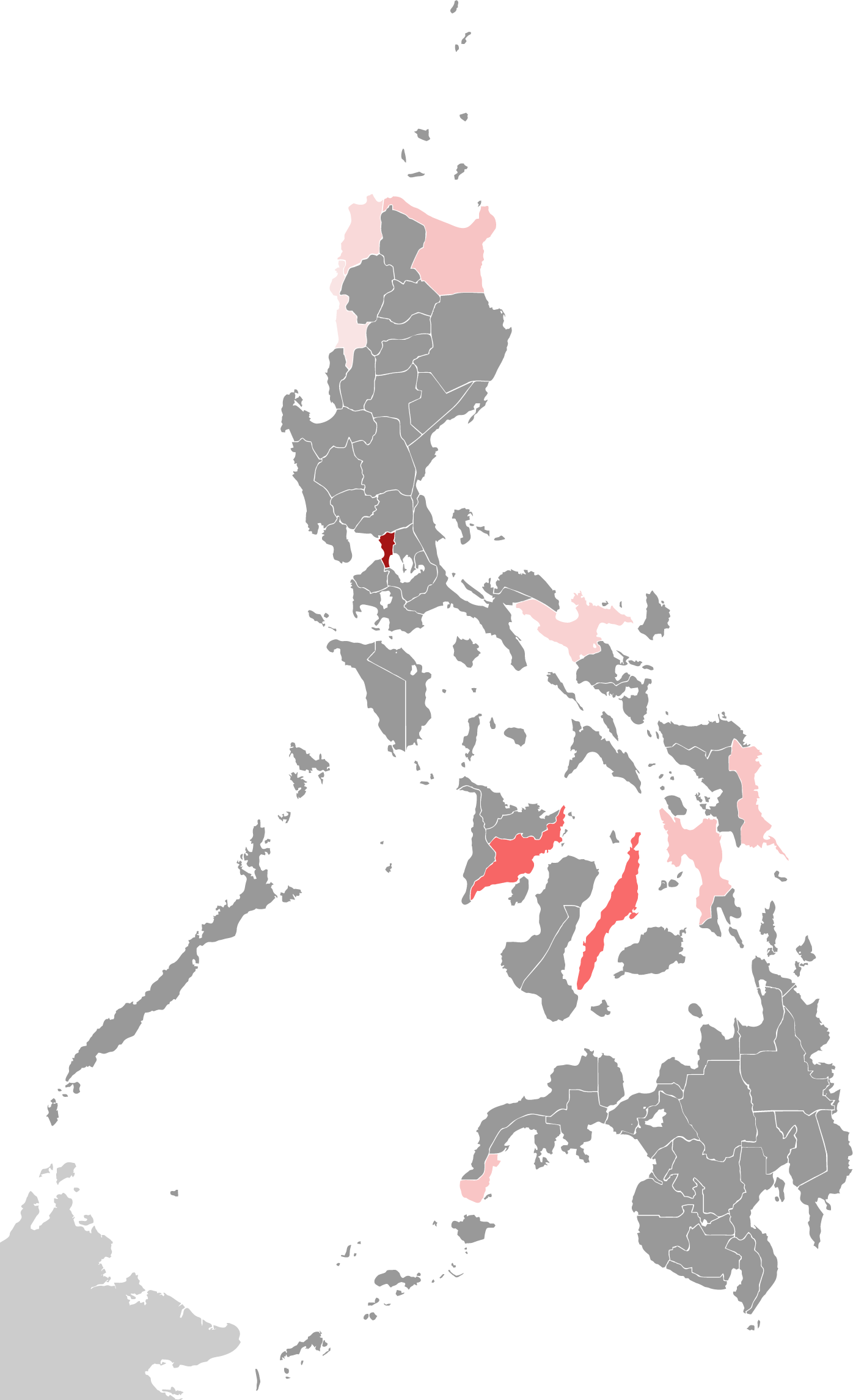
- Area where Hokaglish is spoken

Hokaglish (/ˈhɒkəɡlɪʃ/; Chinese: 相濫摻話; Pe̍h-ōe-jī: Saⁿ-lām-chham-ōe; Tâi-lô: sann-lām-tsham-uē; IPA: [sã˧˧lam˦˩→˨˩t͡sʰam˧˧ue˦˩]), formally known as Philippine Hybrid Hokkien, is a spoken language formed from contact primarily from Philippine Hokkien, Tagalog and Philippine English, with some influence from Philippine Spanish, Cantonese, and other local peripheral languages.

== Usage ==
Typically used amongst some Chinese Filipinos, who are also typically fluent in Taglish and some level of fluency of Philippine Hokkien, Hokaglish is used in various corporations, academic institutions, restaurants, and religious institutions especially in Metro Manila or wherever there are Chinese Filipinos across the Philippines. Some note that this is a result of having to maintain command of all three languages in the spheres of home, school and greater Philippine society. Although used by Chinese Filipinos in general, this form of code-switching or code-mixing is popular especially among the younger generations of Chinese Filipinos, such as Generation X and millennials.

Usually older generation Chinese Filipinos who typically have Philippine Hokkien as their first language, such as those of the Silent Generation, Baby Boomer, and some Generation X, typically use Hokkien Chinese sentence structure as the base while injecting English and Tagalog words while the younger generations who have Tagalog and/or English as their first language, such as Generation X, millennials, and some Baby Boomers and Generation Z use the Filipino/Tagalog sentence structure as the base while injecting the few Hokkien terms they know in the sentence. The latter therefore, in a similar sense with Taglish using Tagalog grammar and syntax, tends to code-mix via conjugating the Hokkien terms the way they do for Filipino/Tagalog words.

== Etymology ==
The term Hokaglish is a portmanteau or blend of Hokkien and Taglish, itself a blend of Tagalog and English. It was first recorded in 2016.

== Classification ==
Earlier thought to be a creole, it may actually be a mixed language similar to Light Warlpiri or Gurindji Kriol. It is also considered a hybrid English or X-English, making it one of the Philippine Englishes.

== See also ==
- Light Warlpiri in Australia
- Gurindji Kriol
- Media Lengua
- Bislish in the Philippines
- Bisalog in the Philippines
- Taglish in the Philippines
- Chavacano in the Philippines
- Singlish, similar phenomenon in Singapore
