= Bisalog =

Mixed speech combining Visayan and Tagalog

Bisalog, also Tagbis, is a portmanteau of the words "Bisaya" and "Tagalog", referring to either a Visayan language or Tagalog being infused with words or expressions from the other. It can also be an informal term for Visayan languages spoken in Mimaropa, or Tagalog dialects infused with words from Visayan languages spoken there, such as in Marinduque.

Speakers of Bisalog often code-switch with English as well, resulting in so-called Bistaglish, Bitaglish, or Tagbislish.

The word is also used by DZRH radio station in their infotainment, bringing latest news from around the provinces (via Aksyon Radyo) every Sunday.

== Background ==
=== Tagalog influence ===
Tagalog is one of the Philippines' national languages, giving it a strong presence in the country's education system. Tagalog as a national language was originally opposed by other language groups when it was declared as such in 1937 because it showed favoritism and dominance to the language, but opposition to its dominant presence decreased over the next forty years. With Tagalog being taught in schools, many Filipinos would adopt it as a second language. In Davao, the older generations speak Tagalog to their children in home settings, and Bisaya is used in everyday settings. Increased usage of Tagalog in younger generations is the result of children paying respect to parents and figures of authority. Despite Tagalog's status as the national language, areas where Tagalog is not heavily used see other ethno-linguistic groups thrive. The majority of Philippine regions do not have Tagalog as the dominant language as many people tend to speak the language from their respective region when in more casual settings.

=== Code-switching practices in the Philippines ===
The Philippines, having been through different periods of colonization (by Spain and the United States, respectively) had foreign languages influence the native languages spoken in the country. The Philippines also has eight languages (Note: These eight major languages include: Bikol (a macrolanguage), Cebuano, Hiligaynon, Ilokano, Maguindanao, Maranao, Tausug, and Waray.) besides Tagalog that have official statuses within their respective regions. Code-switching is common in many places due to the diverse linguistic setting in the country. Along with Tagalog, English is also an official language in the Philippines, resulting in code-switching practices that include English words when necessary. Having so many languages present results in language contact, creating an environment for code-switching to flourish. Different generations (Generations X and Z) in Davao also speak both Bisaya and English fluently.

Code-switching practices also extend to social media. 1,500 tweets from users in Cebuano-speaking regions were analyzed for the use of code-switching. The regions studied were Cebu, Misamis Oriental, Negros Oriental, and Davao. The data returned that the regions used code-switching 18.8%-31.4% of the time, with Davao being the region that employed it the most. The need for code-switching on social media likely stems from how easy it is to reach wider audiences on the web. Cebu was found to code-switch lesser than the calculated average of these regions. The same study found that northern areas were less likely to engage in code-switching than southern regions.

== Sample texts ==
Below are some examples of Bisalog from an article written in Davao and translated to highlight the use of Bisaya and Tagalog.

- "Pumunta ako sa kalapit na park magdagan-dagan."
  - Most of the sentence is spoken in Tagalog. The word "dagan" is a Bisaya word. The Tagalog equivalent is "takbo".
- "Hoy, bumaba ka na pare dahil kanina pa kaming naghulat dito!"
  - "Naghulat" is a Bisaya word. The Tagalog equivalent is "naghintay".
- "Tinali ang aso at nilipat yung iring."
  - "Iring" is a Bisaya word. The Tagalog equivalent is "pusa"

While both Tagalog and Bisaya are Philippine languages, it is important to notice that while some words are similar in spelling and usage, both have differences that distinguishes one language from the other.

== Societal attitudes ==
The attitude towards Tagalog and speaking it can vary in different provinces and generation. In Davao, there are numerous conflicting viewpoints on the emergence of Bisalog. Some believe the emergence of this mixed language could endanger the use of Bisaya in Davao City. The language is also viewed as a variety of Tagalog that emerged due to Davao's population, which largely consists of Cebuano and Tagalog peoples. Although the Cebuano population greatly outweighs the Tagalog population at 74.56% to 3.86%. While opposition to Tagalog as the country's official language is small, there are still some who hold resentment towards Tagalog. Many Bisaya speakers, for example, are more willing to communicate in English rather than Tagalog. Cebu is one of the largest provinces where Bisaya is commonly spoken. The Bisaya population in Cebu hold strong pride towards their language. This pride has led to the founding of groups like the Cebuano Studies Center, who seek to maintain Bisaya as a prominent language. This leads to tense, negative emotions towards Tagalog. Further more, Cebu has a strong influence over the surrounding area, making others in the vicinity strive to accomplish similar feats.

Part of this sentiment could also stem from how present Tagalog is in the country's education system. Tagalog is taught in schools, meaning those who are unable to attend or complete school and learn the language are put at a severe disadvantage for improving economic status.

However, Generations X and Z in Davao see no problem in having Tagalog as the Philippines' national language despite being fluent in Bisaya. The younger generation in Davao also leans more towards Tagalog. These groups argue that knowing how to speak Tagalog makes communication with people from different provinces and native languages more convenient since the other provinces also speak different Philippine languages. While the Davao people have little opposition to using Tagalog, Bisaya remains the dominant language in the area (Davao Article). Davao is also located further away from Cebu, meaning that it is not as influenced by the pro-Bisaya views that Cebu and the surround areas hold.

Other Visayan regions simply see little use of Tagalog and English outside of school and government settings, showing how the views towards and the usage of code-switching differ entirely.

== See also ==
- Language contacts in the Philippines
  - Bislish
  - Hokaglish
  - Taglish
  - Bisakol
