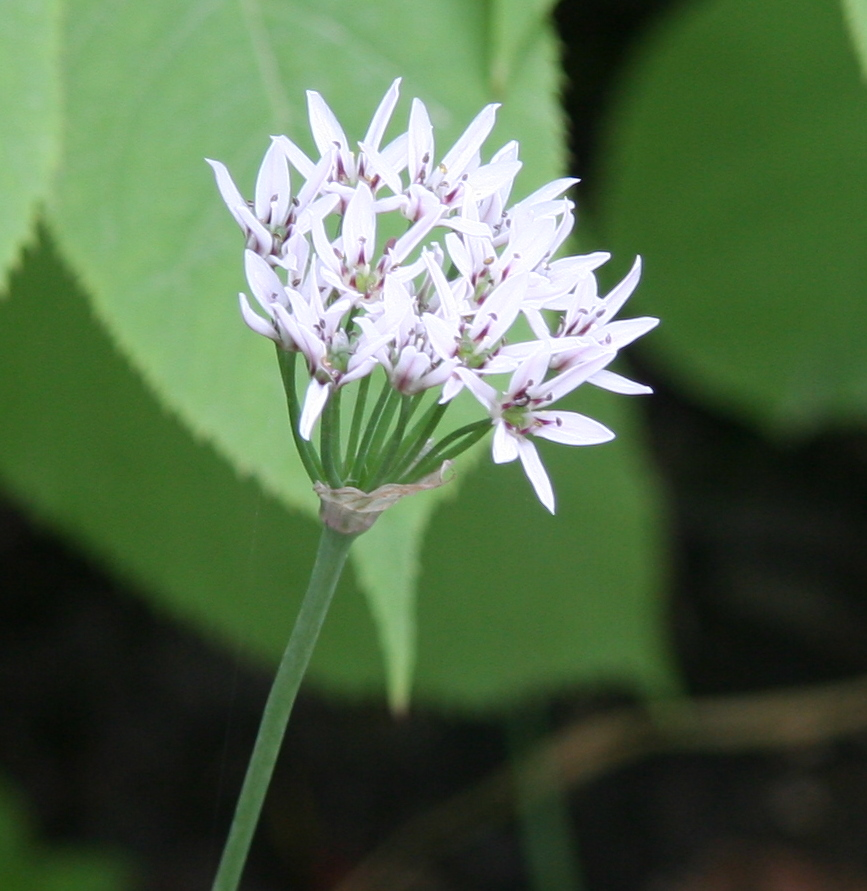

Conservation status
- Least Concern (IUCN 3.1)

Scientific classification
- Kingdom: Plantae
- Clade: Tracheophytes
- Clade: Angiosperms
- Clade: Monocots
- Order: Asparagales
- Family: Amaryllidaceae
- Subfamily: Allioideae
- Genus: Allium
- Subgenus: A. subg. Butomissa
- Species: A. ramosum

Binomial name
- Allium ramosum L. 1753 not Georgi 1779 nor Jacq. 1781

Synonyms
- Synonymy: Aglitheis tatarica (L.f.) Raf.; Allium beckerianum Regel; Allium diaphanum Janka; Allium lancipetalum Y.P.Hsu; Allium odorum L.; Allium potaninii Regel; Allium ramosum Georgi 1779, illegitimate homonym not L. 1753 nor Jacq. 1781; Allium senescens Miq.; Allium tataricum L.f. 1782; Allium tataricum Dryand. 1811, illegitimate homonym not L. 1782; Allium umbellatum Haller f. ex Steud.; Allium weichanicum Palib.; Butomissa tatarica (L.f.) Salisb., not validly published; Moly odorum (L.) Moench

= Allium ramosum =

Species of flowering plant

Allium ramosum, called fragrant-flowered garlic or Chinese chives is a northern Asian species of wild onion native to Kazakhstan, Mongolia, Siberia, the Russian Far East, and northern China (Gansu, Hebei, Heilongjiang, Jilin, Liaoning, Inner Mongolia, Ningxia, Qinghai, Shaanxi, Shandong, Shanxi, Xinjiang). The species is also naturalized in a few places in eastern Europe. In its native range, it grows at elevations of 500–2100 m.

Allium ramosum has clusters of narrow bulbs. Scapes are up to 60 cm tall. Leaves are linear, keeled, shorter than the scape. Umbels have many flowers crowded together. Tepals are white or pale red with a red midvein.

== Uses ==
Allium ramosum is traditionally eaten in northern China and Mongolia. It is gathered between May and July, then preserved with salt for the winter. It is then used to season boiled mutton, or stuffed into dumplings. It is also used to treat stomach ailments. The flowers are gathered in late July and August, and salted.
