= Taglish =

Hybrid language of English and Tagalog

- Englog, Colloquial Tagalog, Colloquial Filipino
- Wikang Taglish
- A short interview with Filipina singer and actress Sarah Geronimo in Taglish
- Native to: Philippines
- Region: Philippines, especially in urban areas, particularly Metro Manila
- Ethnicity: Filipinos
- Language family: Tagalog–English code-mixing; Taglish
- Writing system: Latin

Official status
- Official language in: Not official, de facto Philippines

Language codes
- ISO 639-3: None (mis)

Taglish or Englog is code-switching and/or code-mixing in the use of Tagalog/Filipino and English, the most common languages of the Philippines. The words Taglish and Englog are portmanteaus of the words Tagalog and English. The earliest use of the word Taglish dates back to 1973, while the less common form Tanglish is recorded from 1999.

Taglish is widely used in the Philippines, but is also used by Filipinos in overseas communities. It also has several variants, including Coño English, Jejemon and Swardspeak.

== Description ==
Taglish is very widespread in the Philippines and has become the de facto lingua franca among the urbanized and/or educated middle class. It is largely considered the "normal acceptable conversation style of speaking and writing" in informal settings. It is so widespread that a non-native speaker can be identified easily because they predominantly speak Tagalog, whereas a native speaker would switch freely with English.

According to the linguist Maria Lourdes S. Bautista, there are two contrasting types of code-switching in the Philippines: deficiency-driven and proficiency-driven. Deficiency-driven code-switching occurs when those who are not competent in one language must thus switch back to the language that is more familiar. That is common among younger children, as in the example below given by Bautista:

(English is in italic; Tagalog is in boldface.)

Mother:   Francis, why don't you play the piano for your grandmother?

Francis:   Mommy, I don't want to. It's so hirap eh. ([in Tagalog] "Because it's so difficult.")

Proficiency-driven code-switching, on the other hand, occurs when a person is fully competent in both languages being used and can switch between them easily. That is the main type of code-switching in the islands. This example is given by Bautista, taken from an interview with the television journalist Jessica Soho:

Sa GMA ’yung objectivity has become part na of the culture ([in Tagalog] "At GMA, objectivity has already become part of the culture.") I can tell you with a straight face na wala kaming age-agenda ([in Tagalog] "...that we have nothing like an agenda") – you know, make this person look good and that person look bad. It's really plain and simple journalism. Kung mayroon kang binira, kunin mo ’yung kabilang side ([in Tagalog] "If you attacked somebody, then get the other side") so that both sides are fairly presented.

Proficiency-driven code-switching is characterized by frequent switching of the Matrix Language (ML) between Tagalog and English, demonstrating the high proficiency of the speakers in both languages. There are also a wide range of strategies involved, including: the formation of bilingual verbs by the addition of prefixes, suffixes, and infixes (e.g. Nagse-sweat ako = "I was sweating"); switching at the morphological, word, phrasal, or clausal levels; and the use of system morphemes (like enclitics, conjunctions, etc.) within long stretches of ML content; and even the inversion of the verb–subject–object word order of Tagalog into the subject-verb-object order of English.

According to Bautista, the reason for this type of code-switching is what she termed "communicative efficiency" in which a speaker can "convey meaning using the most accurate, expressive, or succinct lexical items available to them." The linguist Rosalina Morales Goulet also enumerated several reasons for this type of code-switching. They are: "for precision, for transition, for comic effect, for atmosphere, to bridge or create social distance, for snob appeal, and for secrecy."

== Characteristics ==
Taglish was originally a manner of speaking in Metro Manila involving the mixing of Tagalog/Filipino and English together. However, this practice has spread to other areas where both English and Tagalog/Filipino are spoken, including in areas where Tagalog is not the native language. It is characteristically a form of Tagalog/Filipino that mixes in English words, where Tagalog/Filipino is the substratum and English is the superstratum. Next to code-switching between sentences, clauses, and phrases in "pure" Tagalog and English, Taglish speech also code-mixes especially with sentences that follow the rules of Tagalog grammar with Tagalog syntax and morphology, but that occasionally employs English nouns and verbs in place of their Tagalog counterparts. Examples:

English	Tagalog	Taglish
Could you explain it to me?	Maaaring ipaunawà mo sa akin.	Maaaring i-explain mo sa akin.
Could you shed light on it for me?	Pakipaliwanag mo sa akin.	Paki-explain mo sa akin.
Have you finished your homework?	Natapos mo na ba ang iyong takdáng-aralín?	Finished/Natapos na ba 'yung homework mo?
Please call the driver.	Pakitawag ang tsuper.	Pakitawag ang driver.

English verbs and even some nouns can be employed as Tagalog verb roots. This is done by the addition of one or more prefixes or infixes and by the doubling of the first sound of the starting form of the noun or verb, consistent with Tagalog morphology but usually retaining English spelling for the roots.

The English verb drive can be changed to the Tagalog word magda-drive meaning will drive (used in place of the Tagalog word magmamaneho). The English noun Internet can also be changed to the Tagalog word nag-Internet meaning have used the Internet.

Taglish also uses sentences of mixed English or Tagalog words and phrases. The conjunctions used to connect them can come from any of the two. Some examples include:

English	Tagalog	Taglish
I will shop at the mall later.	Bibilí ako sa pámilihan mámayâ.	Magsya-shopping ako sa mall mámayâ.
I just used ChatGPT for my answer.	Ginamitan ko lang ng ChatGPT ang sagot ko.	ChinatGPT ko lang ang sagot ko.
Please turn on the aircon.	Pakibuksán iyong érkon.	Paki-on 'yung aircon.
I put the chicken in the freezer.	Nilagay ko ang manok sa freezer.	Frineezer/Finreezer ko 'yung chicken.
I cannot understand the topic of his lecture.	Hindi kó maíntindihán ang paksâ ng pagtuturò niya.	Hindi kó ma-understand ang topic ng lecture niya.
Could you fax your estimate tomorrow.	Pakipadalá na lang ng tantiyá mo sa akin bukas.	Paki-fax na lang ng estimate mo sa akin bukas.
Eat now or else, you will not get fat.	Kumain ka na ngayon, kundi, Hindi ka tátabâ.	Eat now or else, hindi ka tátabâ.

Because of its informal nature, prescriptivists of English and Tagalog discourage its use.

There are examples of modern books in Taglish: the adventure novel Bullet With A Name (2018) by Kirsten Nimwey, the love novel Aeternum Dream (2018) by Harkin Deximire, and more.

Code-switching often occurs at phrase boundaries or through the inflection of English loan words with Tagalog affixes, such as combining English verb roots with Tagalog prefixes (e.g., 'naka-block' or 'nag-scroll')."

For example.

== Forms ==
=== Swardspeak ===
Swardspeak is a kind of Taglish/Englog LGBT slang used by the LGBT demographic of the Philippines. It is a form of slang that uses words and terms primarily from Philippine English, Tagalog/Filipino, and/or Cebuano and Hiligaynon, and occasionally as well as Japanese, Korean, Chinese, Sanskrit, or other languages. Names of celebrities, fictional characters, and trademarks are also often used.

=== Cacahuate (Carajo) English ===
Coño English (Tagalog: Konyo) or Colegiala English (Spanish: [koleˈxjala]) is a sociolect of Taglish that originated from the younger generations of affluent families in Manila. The word coño or Tagalog: konyo, itself came from Spanish: coño, lit. 'cunt'. It is a form of Philippine English that mixes Tagalog/Filipino words, where opposite to Taglish, English is the substratum and Tagalog/Filipino is the superstratum.

The most common aspect of Coño English is the building of verbs by using the English word "make" with the root word of a Tagalog verb:

English	Tagalog	Coño English
Let's skewer the fishballs.	Tusukin natin ang mga pishbol.	Let's make tusok-tusok the fishballs.
Tell me the story of what happened...	Ikuwento mo sa akin kung ano ang nangyari...	Make kuwento to me what happened...

And adding the English conjunctions "like so" before using a Tagalog adjective to finish the sentence, akin to valley girl speak:

English	Tagalog	Coño English
He stinks!	Ang baho niya!	He's like so mabaho!
We were all annoyed with him.	Kinaiinisan namin siya.	We're like so inis sa kaniya!

Sometimes, Tagalog interjections such as ano, naman, pa, na (or nah), no (or noh), a (or ha), e (or eh), and o (or oh) are placed to add emphasis. Tagalog: 'No/Noh / A/Ah (contractions from Tagalog: Ano, lit. 'What') are used for questions and are added only to the end of a sentence. Tagalog: Ano, lit. 'What', is also used for questions and is placed in the front or the end. It may also be used as an interjection, no?, (equal to the Spanish ¿no? and the German nicht?) and is pronounced as /no/ or /nɔ/, with a pure vowel instead of the English glide, which shows influence from Spanish in Filipino.

"E"/"Eh" (added to answers to questions) and "o"/"oh" (for statements) are used for exclamations and are added to the front only. Tagalog: pa, lit. 'yet' (not yet; not yet done; to continue; still) and Tagalog: na, lit. 'already; now' can be placed in the middle or end. Tagalog: naman (particle used to soften requests or put emphasis) is placed anywhere.

English	Tagalog	Coño English
I feel so hot already; please fan me now.	Naiinitan na ako; paypayan mo naman ako.	I'm so init na; please paypay me naman.
You wait here while I fetch my friend, all right?	Hintayin mo ako habang sinusundo ko ang kaibigan ko, a?	You make hintay here while I make sundo my friend, a?
What, you will still eat that apple after it already fell on the floor?	Ano, kakainin mo pa ang mansanas na'yan matapos mahulog na iyan sa sahig?	Ano, you will make kain pa that apple after it made hulog na on the sahig?

English adjectives are often replaced with Tagalog verbs. The language also occasionally uses Spanish words or Spanish loanwords from Filipino/Tagalog, like baño/banyo ("bathroom"), tostado ("toasted") and jamón ("ham").

English	Tagalog	Coño English
They're so competent!	Magaling sila!	They're so galing!
Where's the bathroom?	Nasaan ang palikuran/banyo?	Where's the baño?
Keep my ham on the grill.	Itago mo lang ang hamon ko sa ihawan.	Make tago my jamón on the grill.
I want my ham toasted.	Gusto kong tostado ang hamon ko.	I want my jamón tostado.

The perceived feminine sound of Coño English makes male speakers sometimes overuse the Tagalog: pare, lit. 'dude; pal; bro; buddy' to make it sound more masculine. Sometimes Tagalog: tsong, lit. 'dude; pal; bro; buddy' is used instead of pare or along with it:

English	Tagalog	Coño English
Dude, he's so unreliable.	Pare, ang labo niya.	Pare, he's so malabo, pare.
Dude, he's so unreliable.	Tsong, ang labo niya.	Tsong, he's so malabo, tsong.

== See also ==
- Bisalog, code-switching between Visayan and Tagalog
- Bislish, code-switching between Visayan and English
- Hokaglish, a mixed language of Philippine Hokkien, Tagalog and English
- Pseudo-anglicism
