= Classical Cebuano =

Historical form of Cebuano language

- Spanish-Era Cebuano
- Karaang Sinugboanon, Karaang Binisayâ
- Native to: Philippines
- Region: present-day regions of Central Visayas and the northern coast of Mindanao
- Ethnicity: Visayan
- Era: 16th-19th century, developed into Early Modern Cebuano around the late 19th century
- Language family: Austronesian: Malayo-Polynesian; Philippine; Greater Central Philippine; Central Philippine; Bisayan; Cebuan; Classical Cebuano
- Writing system: Badlit (before c. 18th century); Latin script

Language codes
- ISO 639-3: –

Classical Cebuano, or Spanish-Era Cebuano, (Cebuano: Karaang Sinugboanon, Karaang Binisayâ, Binisayâ sa Katuigan sa Katsilà; Badlit: pre-virama: ᜃᜇᜀ ᜅ ᜊᜒᜈᜒᜐᜌ, post-virama: ᜃᜇᜀᜈ᜴ ᜅ ᜊᜒᜈᜒᜐᜌ) was a form of the Cebuano language spoken during the Spanish colonial era of the Philippines. It was the primary language spoken in Cebu, Bohol, and other parts of Visayas and Mindanao.

== History ==
The earliest surviving record of Cebuano was from a wordlist collected by Antonio Pigafetta during the Magellan expedition in 1521. The wordlist contains about 160 Cebuano words (some of which are in Malay) written in an Italian-influenced orthography, which is considered problematic due to its inconsistent and unphonetic spelling system. The oldest reliable glimpse of Cebuano's grammar and vocabulary was from Domingo Ezguerra's Arte de la Lengua Bisaya de la Provincia de Leyte, a Waray grammar book written in 1663. The first dedicated grammar book for Cebuano, Francisco Encina's Arte de la Lengua Zebuana, was compiled in 1801 (40 years after his death).

== Phonology ==
The phonological system of Classical Cebuano was relatively minimal compared to Modern Cebuano, which has more phonological inventory due to the influence of foreign languages such as Spanish and English.

=== Vowels ===
The Classical Cebuano phonemic inventory consists of three vowel phonemes (/a/, /i/, /u/). Some dialects of Modern Cebuano, particularly those in Bohol, have retained a close back unrounded vowel /ɯ/, which means it might have existed in Classical Cebuano, although unrecorded and possibly dialectal.

Classical Cebuano Vowels
Height	Front	Central	Back
Close	i, y /i/		u, o /u/
Open		a /a/	

=== Consonants ===
The Classical Cebuano phonemic inventory consisted of 15 consonant phonemes (in which /d/ and /r/ were treated as a single phoneme). The consonant /r/ was pronounced only when the phoneme /d/ was situated between two vowels. The natives described the final -d as a medial sound between /r/ and /d/.

Classical Cebuano Consonants
	Labial		Dental		Palatal	Velar		Glottal
Nasal	m /m/		n /n̪/			ng̃ /ŋ/		
Stop	p /p/	b /b/	t /t̪/	d, r /d̪/		c, qu /k/	g /ɡ/	` /ʔ/
Fricative			s /s̪/					h /h/
Approximant			l /l̪/		y /j/	u /w/		
Rhotic			d, r /ɾ̪~r̪/					

In this article, the modern Cebuano orthography is used, with k instead of c, qu.

== Grammar ==
=== Case Markers ===
Classical Cebuano possessed separate plural personal case markers (sa, na, and ka), which are not retained in any dialect of Modern Cebuano.

Classical Cebuano Case Markers
		Direct	Indirect	Oblique
General	Definite	ang, ak (Note: Only used in Argao.)	sa	
General	Indefinite	ing, i	ug, ak (Note: Only used in Bohol.)	
Personal	Singular	si	ni	kan
Personal	Plural	sa	na	(sa)ka

=== Pronouns ===
Classical Cebuano underwent morphological changes throughout the Spanish period. One of the most notable was the change from *s(i)- to *k(i)- as the direct case-marking prefix for Cebuano demonstrative (e.g. siní -> kiní) and interrogative (e.g. sinsa -> kinsa) pronouns. Classical Cebuano, especially the one spoken in Bohol, still had plural case markers sa, na, and ka, which are already obsolete in Modern Cebuano. These were also used to form plural demonstratives, which are considered rare among Philippine languages.

==== Personal Pronouns ====
Classical Cebuano Personal Pronouns (1760)
Person	Number and Clusivity		Direct		Indirect			Oblique	
Person	Number and Clusivity		Independent	Enclitic	Independent	Postposed	Enclitic	Default	Suppletive
First	Singular		akó		akò	nakò	ko, ta*	kan-akò	sa akò
First	Plural	Inclusive	kitá		atò	natò	ta	kan-atò	sa atò
First	Plural	Exclusive	kamí		amò	namò		kan-amò	sa amò
Second	Singular		ikáw	ka	imo	nimo	mo	kan-imo	sa imo
Second	Plural		kamó		inyo	ninyo		kan-inyo	sa inyo
Third	Singular		siyá		iya	niya	na	kan-iya	sa iya
Third	Plural		silá		ila	nila		kan-ila	sa ila

Only when paired with a second-person pronoun (as in "ta ka", "ta ikaw", and "ta kamo") or as an introspective "I".

==== Demonstratives ====
Classical Cebuano Demonstratives (1663)
		Direct		Indirect		Oblique		Gloss
		Cebu	Bohol	Cebu	Bohol	Cebu	Bohol	Gloss
Proximal	Singular	kadí	siadi	niadi		kan-adi		this (next to me)
Proximal	Plural		saadi		naadi		kaadi	these (next to me)
Medioproximal	Singular	kiní	siini	niini		kan-ini		this (next to you and me)
Medioproximal	Plural		saini		naini		kaini	these (next to you and me)
Medial	Singular	kanâ	sianà	nianà		kan-anà		that (next to you)
Medial	Plural		saanà		naanà		kaanà	those (next to you)
Mediodistal	Singular	kitó	siito	niito		kan-ito		that (over there, near)
Mediodistal	Plural		saito		naito		kaito	those (over there, near)
Distal	Singular	kadto	siadto	niadto		kan-adto		yon (over there, far)
Distal	Plural		saadto		naadto		kaadto	yons (over there, far)

==== Interrogatives ====
Classical and Modern Cebuano Interrogatives
		Classical Cebuano (1663)		Modern Cebuano
		Cebu	Bohol	Modern Cebuano
WHAT		unsa		unsa
OF/TO WHAT		sa unsa		sa unsa
WHO (Direct)	Singular	sinsa ~ kinsa		kinsa
WHO (Direct)	Plural		sainsa	kinsa
WHOSE (Indirect)	Singular	ninsa ~ niinsa		ni kinsa
WHOSE (Indirect)	Plural		nainsa	ni kinsa
TO WHOM (Oblique)	Singular	kansa	kaninsa	kang kinsa
TO WHOM (Oblique)	Plural		kainsa	kang kinsa
WHICH		ang hain	kasa	hain
OF/TO WHICH		sa hain	niasa	sa hain

== See also ==
- Cebuano language
- Cebuano grammar
- Bisayan languages
- Waray language
- Pigafetta's dictionary
