= Handuraw =

Handuraw is the Cebuano word for "the power to imagine," "to reminisce," or "flashback."

== Handuraw Festival ==
The Handuraw festival is an annual dramatic cultural presentation in Leon, Iloilo, Philippines, that commemorates the transfer of Pueblo del Camando (old site of the municipality) to Sitio Capan (the present site of the municipality). It is a week-long event that includes food festivals, trade fairs and a showcase of local agricultural produce. It is held every 1 September.

On December 28–30, 2006, the city government of Dapitan, Philippines, held its own Handuraw Festival in part as culmination of the 110th death anniversary of national hero Dr. Jose Rizal in 2006. The festival was held again on 2007 to promote Dapitan and Jose Rizal's work. Dapitan was the last stop of the touring exhibition, "Rizal-Blumentritt" of which the Czech Embassy promoted the role of Ferdinand Blumentritt in Rizal's life. The three-day festival featured a number of activities and competitions such as painting contest at the Jose Rizal Memorial State College, a school named after the national hero, Rizal look-alike contest, Mutya sa Handuraw beauty pageant, initiation of new members of Knights of Rizal, fluvial parade, float parade, street dancing, film showing of Rizal sa Dapitan story and many others.
