= Cebuano language =

Austronesian language of the Philippines

Cebuano
- Bisayâ, Binisayâ
- Sinugboanon
- Native to: Philippines
- Region: Central Visayas, almost all of Negros Island Region, western parts of Eastern Visayas, and most parts of Mindanao
- Ethnicity: Visayans
- Native speakers: 20 million (2023 estimate)
- Language family: Austronesian: Malayo-Polynesian; Philippine; Greater Central Philippine; Central Philippine; Bisayan; Cebuano
- Early form: Classical Cebuano (late 18th century)
- Dialects: Sialo Cebuano (Cebu Island); Northern Cebu Cebuano (Cebu Island); Negrosanon Cebuano; Bohol Cebuano; Leyteño Cebuano; Mindanao Cebuano; Davao Cebuano
- Writing system: Latin (Filipino alphabet); Philippine Braille; Historically Badlit

Official status
- Recognised minority language in: Regional language in the Philippines
- Regulated by: Visayan Academy of Arts and Letters; Komisyon sa Wikang Filipino

Language codes
- ISO 639-2: ceb
- ISO 639-3: ceb
- Glottolog: cebu1242
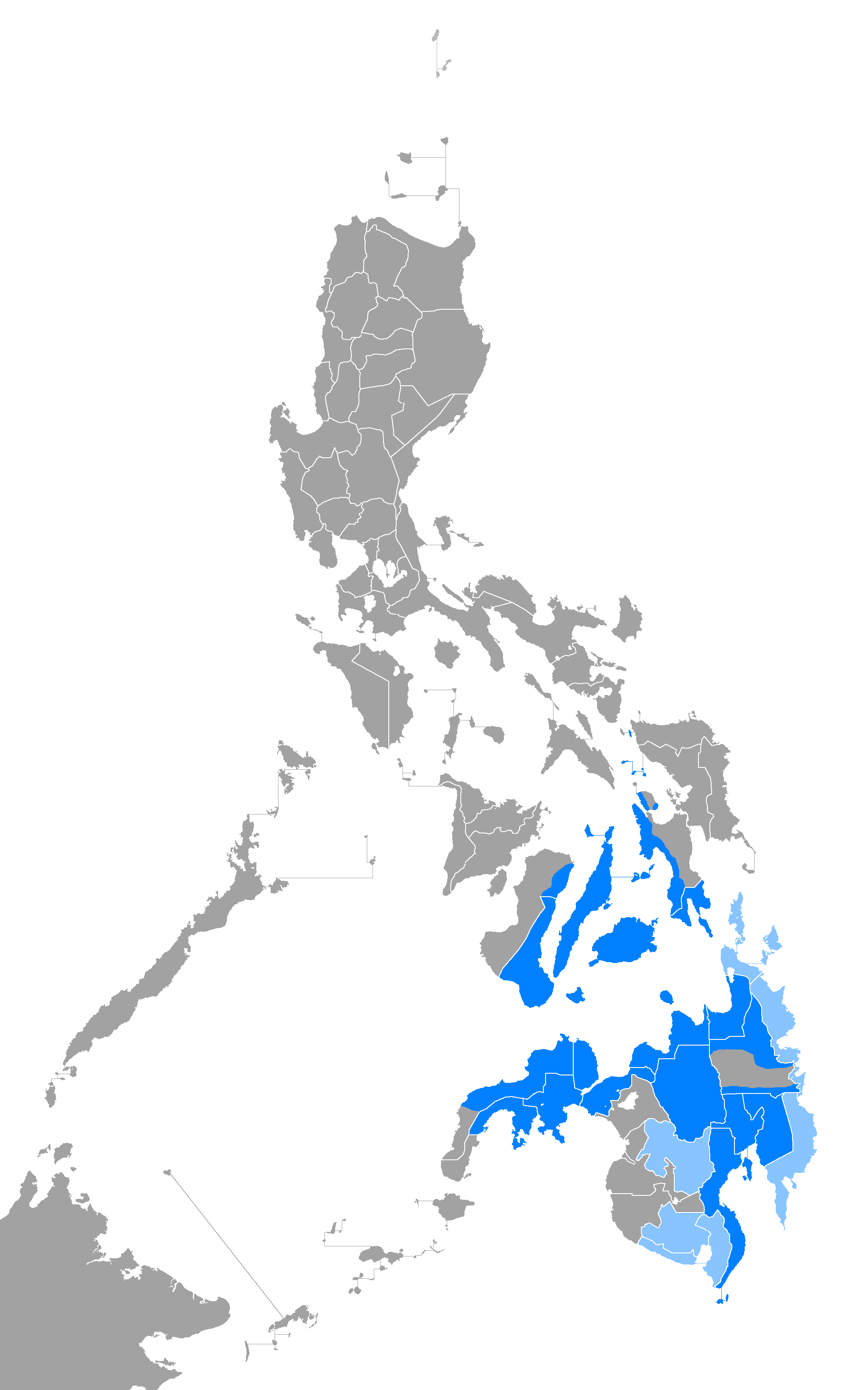
- Cebuano-speaking area in the Philippines

Cebuano (/sɛˈbwɑːnoʊ/ se-BWAH-noh) is an Austronesian language spoken in the southern Philippines by the Visayan people, and other ethnic groups as a secondary language. It is natively, though informally, known by the generic names Bisayâ (Cebuano pronunciation: [bisəˈjaʔ]), or Binisayâ ([bɪniːsəˈjaʔ]) (both terms translated into English as Visayan, though this should not be confused with other Visayan languages) (Note: Reference to the language as Binisayâ is discouraged by many linguists, in light of the many languages within the Visayan language group that might be confounded with the term.) and sometimes referred to in English sources as Cebuan (/sɛˈbuːən/ seb-OO-ən). It is spoken by the Visayan ethnolinguistic groups native to the islands of Cebu, Bohol, Siquijor, the eastern half of Negros, the western half of Leyte, the northern coastal areas of Northern Mindanao and the eastern part of Zamboanga del Norte due to Spanish settlements during the 18th century. In modern times, it has also spread to the Davao Region, Cotabato, Camiguin, parts of the Dinagat Islands, and the lowland regions of Caraga, often displacing native languages in those areas (most of which are closely related to it).

While Tagalog has the largest number of native speakers among the languages of the Philippines today, Cebuano had the largest native-language-speaking population from the 1950s until about the 1980s. It is by far the most widely spoken of the Bisayan languages.

Cebuano is the lingua franca of Central Visayas, the western parts of Eastern Visayas, some western parts of Palawan, and most parts of Mindanao. The name Cebuano is derived from the island of Cebu, which is the source of Standard Cebuano. Cebuano is also the primary language in Western Leyte—noticeably in Ormoc. Cebuano is assigned the ISO 639-2 three-letter code ceb but not an ISO 639-1 two-letter code.

The Commission on the Filipino Language, the Philippine government body charged with developing and promoting the national and regional languages of the country, spells the name of the language in Filipino as Sebwano.

While it is not widely spoken in Luzon, there are a few Cebuano communities in Metro Manila, Calabarzon, Bulacan, throughout Central Luzon, northernmost Luzon, including Cordillera Administrative Region, and Ilocos Region.

== Nomenclature ==
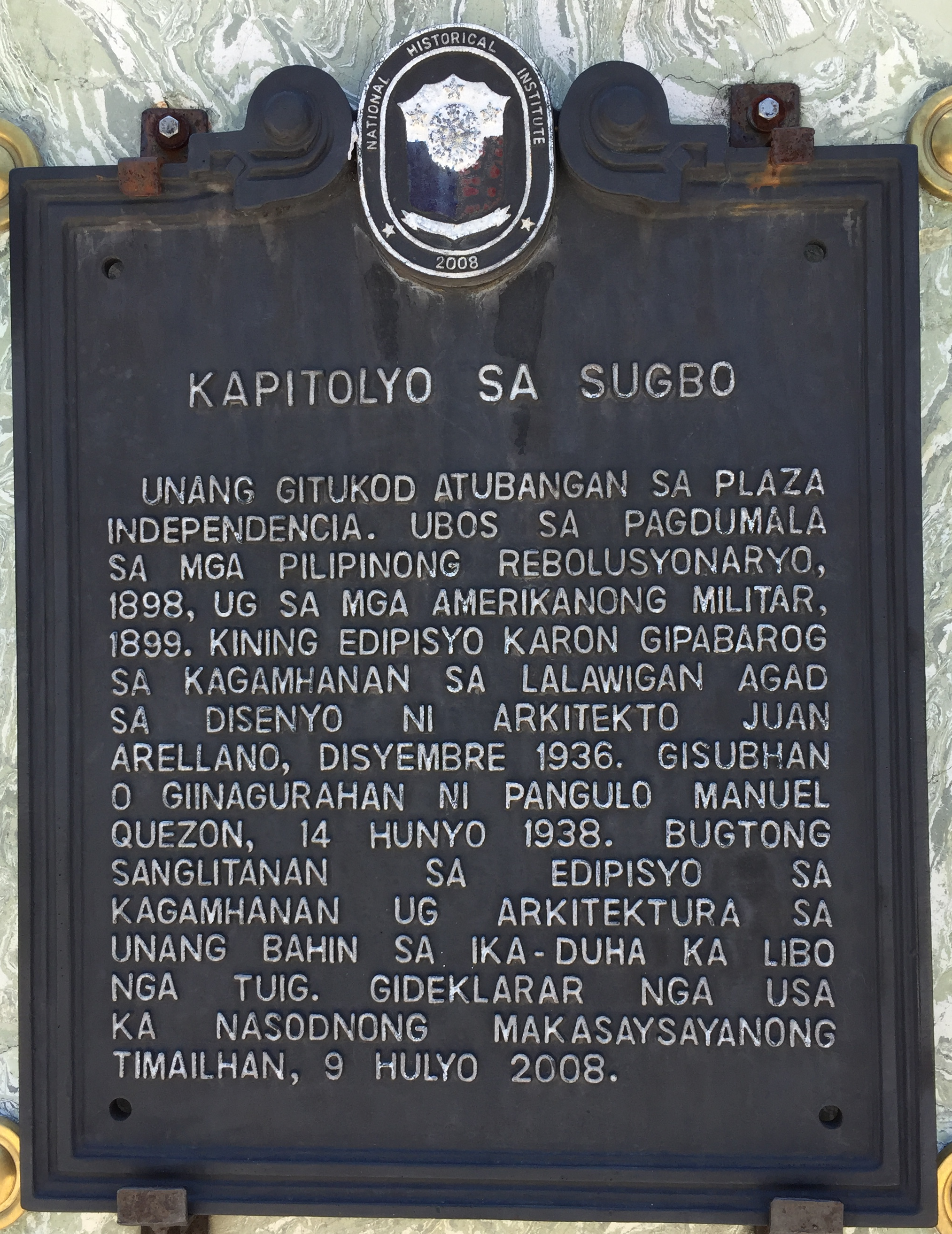
Cebu Provincial Capitol's historical marker in Cebu City

The term Cebuano derives from "Cebu" (which is an island found in central east of the Philippines (some peoples believe that this language came from Cebu)) and "ano" which means (in this case) "people/s", a Latinate calque reflecting the Philippines' Spanish colonial heritage. Speakers of Cebuano in Cebu and even those from outside of Cebu commonly refer to the language as Bisayâ.

The name Cebuano, however, has not been accepted by all who speak it. Cebuano speakers in certain portions of Leyte, Northern Mindanao, Davao Region, Caraga, and Zamboanga Peninsula objected to the name of the language and claimed that their ancestry traces back to Bisayâ speakers native to their place and not from immigrants or settlers from Cebu. Furthermore, they refer to their ethnicity as Bisayâ instead of Cebuano and their language as Binisayâ instead of Cebuano. However, there is a pushback on these objections. Some language enthusiasts insist on referring to the language as Cebuano because, as they claim, using the terms Bisayâ and Binisayâ to refer to ethnicity and language, respectively, is exclusivist and disenfranchises the speakers of the Hiligaynon language and the Waray language who also refer to their languages as Binisayâ to distinguish them from Cebuano Bisayâ.

Existing linguistic studies on Visayan languages, most notably that of R. David Paul Zorc, has described the language spoken in Cebu, Negros Oriental, Bohol (as Boholano dialect), Leyte, and most parts of Mindanao as "Cebuano". Zorc's studies on Visayan language serves as the bible of linguistics in the study of Visayan languages. The Jesuit linguist and a native of Cabadbaran, Rodolfo Cabonce, S.J., published two dictionaries during his stays in Cagayan de Oro City and Manolo Fortich in Bukidnon: a Cebuano-English dictionary in 1955, and an English-Cebuano dictionary in 1983.

During the Spanish Colonial Period, the Spaniards broadly referred to the speakers of Hiligaynon, Cebuano, Waray, Kinaray-a, and Aklanon as Visaya and made no distinctions among these languages.

== Geographical distribution ==
As of the 2020 (but released in 2023) statistics released by the Philippine Statistics Authority, the current number of households that speak Cebuano is approximately 1.72 million and around 6.5% of the country's population speak it inside their home. However, in a journal published in 2020, the number of speakers is estimated to be 15.9 million which in turn based it on a 2019 study.

Cebuano is spoken in the provinces of Cebu, Bohol, Siquijor, Negros Oriental, northeastern Negros Occidental (alongside Ilonggo), southern Masbate, western portions of Leyte and Biliran (to a great extent, alongside Waray), and a large portion of Mindanao, notably the urban areas of Zamboanga Peninsula, Northern Mindanao, Davao Region, Caraga and some parts of Soccsksargen (alongside Ilonggo, Maguindanaon, indigenous Mindanaoan languages and to the lesser extent, Ilocano). It is also spoken in some remote barangays of San Francisco and San Andres in Quezon Province in Luzon, due to its geographical contact with Cebuano-speaking parts of Burias Island in Masbate. Some dialects of Cebuano have different names for the language. Cebuano speakers from Cebu are mainly called "Cebuano" while those from Bohol are "Boholano" or "Bol-anon". Cebuano speakers in Leyte identify their dialect as Kanâ meaning that (Leyte Cebuano or Leyteño). Speakers in Mindanao and Luzon refer to the language simply as Binisayâ or Bisayà.

== History ==
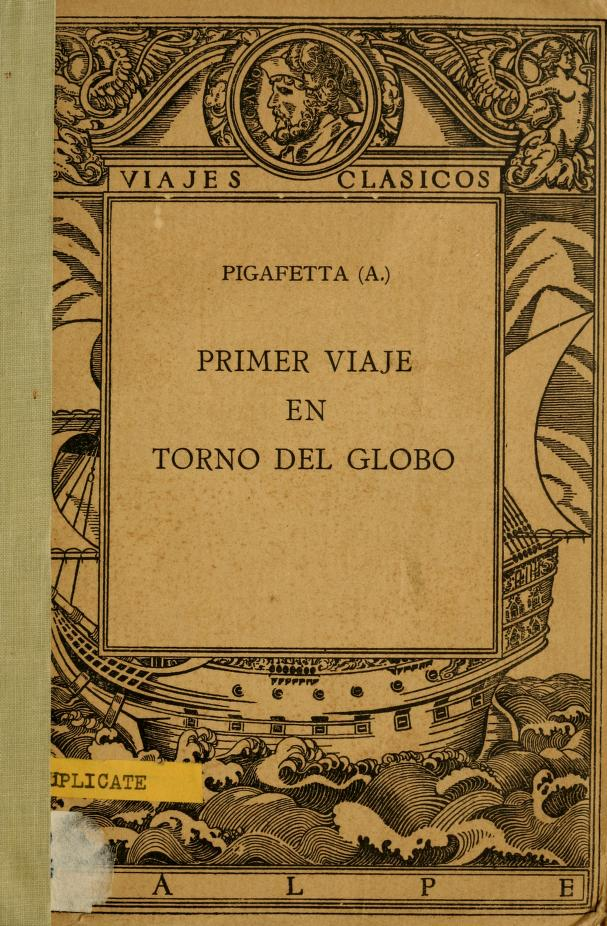
Pigafetta's dictionary containing vocabularies from Malay and Bisayan languages which also includes Cebuano which is then translated to or from Italian

The Cebuano language is a descendant of the hypothesized reconstructed Proto-Philippine language, which in turn descended from Proto-Malayo-Polynesian, making it distantly related to many languages in Maritime Southeast Asia, including Indonesian and Malay. The earlier forms of the language are hard to trace as a result of lack of documents written using the language through different time periods and also because the natives used to write on easily perishable material rather than on processed paper or parchment.

The earliest record of the Cebuano language was first documented in a list of words compiled by Antonio Pigafetta, an Italian explorer who was part of Ferdinand Magellan's 1521 expedition. While there is evidence of a writing system for the language, its use appears to have been sporadic. Spaniards recorded the Visayan script, which was called kudlit-kabadlit by the natives. Although Spanish chroniclers Francisco Alcina and Antonio de Morga wrote that almost every native was literate in the 17th century CE, it appears to have been exaggerated as accounted for lack of physical evidence and contradicting reports of different accounts. A report from 1567 CE describes how the natives wrote the language, and stated that the natives learned it from the Malays, but a century later another report claimed that the Visayan natives learned it from the Tagalogs. Despite the confirmation of the usage of baybayin in the region, the documents of the language being written in it other than Latin between the 17th century CE and 18th century CE are now rare. In the 18th century CE, Francisco Encina, a Spanish priest, compiled a grammar book on the language, but his work was published sometime only by the early 19th century CE. The priest recorded the letters of the Latin alphabet used for the language, and in a separate report, his name was listed as the recorder of the non-Latin characters used by the natives.

Cebuano written literature is generally agreed to have started with Vicente Yap Sotto, who wrote "Maming" in 1901, but earlier he wrote a more patriotic piece of literature that was published a year later after Maming because of American censorship during the US occupation of the Philippines. However, there existed a piece that was more of a conduct book rather than a fully defined story itself, written in 1852 by Fray Antonio Ubeda de la Santísima Trinidad.

== Phonology ==
=== Vowels ===
Below is the vowel system of Cebuano with their corresponding letter representation in angular brackets:

Standard Cebuano vowel phonemes
	Front	Central	Back
Close	i ⟨i⟩		u ⟨u⟩
Mid	ɛ ⟨e⟩		o ⟨o⟩
Open		a ⟨a⟩	

- /a/ an open front unrounded vowel similar to English "father"
- /ɛ/ an open-mid front unrounded vowel similar to English "bed"
- /i/ a close front unrounded vowel similar to English "machine"
- /o/ a close-mid back rounded vowel similar to English "forty"
- /u/ a close back rounded vowel similar to English "flute"

Sometimes, ⟨a⟩ may also be pronounced as the open-mid back unrounded vowel [ʌ] (as in English "gut"); ⟨e⟩ or ⟨i⟩ as the near-close near-front unrounded vowel [ɪ] (as in English "bit"); and ⟨o⟩ or ⟨u⟩ as the open-mid back rounded vowel [ɔ] (as in English "thought") or the near-close near-back rounded vowel [ʊ] (as in English "hook").

During the precolonial and Spanish period, Cebuano had only three vowel phonemes: /a/, /i/ and /u/. This was later expanded to five vowels with the introduction of Spanish. As a consequence, the vowels ⟨o⟩ or ⟨u⟩, as well as ⟨e⟩ or ⟨i⟩, are still mostly allophones. They can be freely switched with each other without losing their meaning (free variation), though it may sound strange to a native listener, depending on their dialect. The vowel /a/ can be pronounced as either [a] or [ʌ], or as [ɔ] immediately after the consonant /w/. Loanwords, however, are usually more conservative in their orthography and pronunciation (e.g. dyip, "jeepney" from English "jeep", will never be written or spoken as dyep).

There are only four diphthongs, since ⟨o⟩ and ⟨u⟩ are allophones. These are /aj/, /uj/, /aw/, and /iw/.

=== Consonants ===
For Cebuano consonants, all the stops are unaspirated. The velar nasal /ŋ/ occurs in all positions, including at the beginning of a word (e.g. ngano, "why"). The glottal stop /ʔ/ is most commonly encountered in between two vowels, but can also appear in all positions.

Like in Tagalog, glottal stops are usually not indicated in writing. When indicated, it is commonly written as a hyphen or an apostrophe if the glottal stop occurs in the middle of the word (e.g. tu-o or tu'o, "right"). More formally, when it occurs at the end of the word, it is indicated by a circumflex accent if both a stress and a glottal stop occurs at the final vowel (e.g. basâ, "wet"); or a grave accent if the glottal stop occurs at the final vowel, but the stress occurs at the penultimate syllable (e.g. batà, "child").

Below is a chart of Cebuano consonants with their corresponding letter representation in parentheses:

Standard Cebuano consonants
	Bilabial		Dental		Palatal/ Postalveolar	Velar		Glottal
Nasal		m ⟨m⟩		n̪ ⟨n⟩			ŋ ⟨ng⟩	
Stop	p ⟨p⟩	b ⟨b⟩	t̪ ⟨t⟩	d̪ ⟨d⟩		k ⟨k⟩	ɡ ⟨g⟩	ʔ
Fricative			s̪ ⟨s⟩					h ⟨h⟩
Affricate					dʒ ⟨j,dy⟩			
Approximant (Lateral)					j ⟨y⟩		w ⟨w⟩	
Approximant (Lateral)				l̪ ⟨l⟩				
Rhotic				ɾ̪~r̪ ⟨r⟩				

In certain dialects, /l/ ⟨l⟩ may be interchanged with /w/ ⟨w⟩ in between vowels and vice versa depending on the following conditions:

- If ⟨l⟩ is in between ⟨a⟩ and ⟨u⟩/⟨o⟩, the vowel succeeding ⟨l⟩ is usually (but not always) dropped (e.g. lalóm, "deep", becomes lawóm or lawm).
- If ⟨l⟩ is in between ⟨u⟩/⟨o⟩ and ⟨a⟩, it is the vowel that is preceding ⟨l⟩ that is instead dropped (e.g. bulan, "moon", becomes buwan or bwan)
- If ⟨l⟩ is in between two like vowels, the ⟨l⟩ may be dropped completely and the vowel lengthened. For example, dalá ("bring"), becomes da (/d̪aː/); and tulód ("push") becomes tud (/t̪uːd̪/). Except if the l is in between closed syllables or is in the beginning of the penultimate syllable; in which case, the ⟨l⟩ is dropped along with one of the vowels, and no lengthening occurs. For example, kalatkat, "climb", becomes katkat (/ˈkatkat/ not /ˈkaːtkat/).

A final ⟨l⟩ can also be replaced with ⟨w⟩ in certain areas in Bohol (e.g. tambal, "medicine", becomes tambaw). In very rare cases in Cebu, ⟨l⟩ may also be replaced with ⟨y⟩ in between the vowels ⟨a⟩ and ⟨e⟩/⟨i⟩ (e.g. tingali, "maybe", becomes tingayi).

In some parts of Bohol and Southern Leyte, /j/ ⟨y⟩ is also often replaced with d͡ʒ ⟨j/dy⟩ when it is in the beginning of a syllable (e.g. kalayo, "fire", becomes kalajo). It can also happen even if the ⟨y⟩ is at the final position of the syllable and the word, but only if it is moved to the initial position by the addition of the affix -a. For example, baboy ("pig") can not become baboj, but baboya can become baboja.

All of the above substitutions are considered allophonic and do not change the meaning of the word.

In rarer instances, the consonant ⟨d⟩ might also be replaced with ⟨r⟩ when it is in between two vowels (e.g. Boholano idô for standard Cebuano irô, "dog"), but ⟨d⟩ and ⟨r⟩ are not considered allophones, though they may have been in the past.

=== Stress ===
Stress accent is phonemic, which means that words with different accent placements, such as dapít (near) and dápit (place), are considered separate.

The stress is predictably on the penult when the second-to-last syllable is closed (CVC or VC).

Obligatory stress for CVC penults in Cebuano
Root	Derived	
butó /bu.ˈtu/ 'explode'	nabúthan /na.ˈbut.han/ 'caught in a blast'	NOT buthán /na.but.ˈhan/
dakô /da.ˈkuʔ/ 'big (singular)	dagkò /ˈdag.koʔ/ 'big (plural)	NOT dagkô /dag.ˈkoʔ/

On the other hand, when the syllable is open (CV or V), the stress can be on either the penultimate or the final syllable (although there are certain grammatical conditions or categories under which the stress is predictable, such as with numbers and pronouns).

== Writing system ==
The Cebuano language is written using the Latin script and the writing convention is based on the Filipino orthography. Though it was recorded that the language used a different writing system prior to the introduction of the Latin script, its use was so rare that there is hardly any surviving accounts of Cebuano being written in what was called badlit. Modern Cebuano uses the 28-letter Filipino alphabet:

Majuscule form
A	B	C	D	E	F	G	H	I	J	K	L	M	N	Ñ	NG	O	P	Q	R	S	T	U	V	W	X	Y	Z
Minuscule form
a	b	c	d	e	f	g	h	i	j	k	l	m	n	ñ	ng	o	p	q	r	s	t	u	v	w	x	y	z

Predominantly, the 20 letters of the Abakada alphabet are used, which consists of 5 vowels and 15 consonants, including the digraph "ng". The letters c, f, j, q, v, x and z are also used but in foreign loanwords, while the "ñ" is used for Spanish names (e.g. Santo Niño). The "Ng" digraph is present in the alphabet since it is part of the phonology of most Philippine languages representing the sound of the velar nasal /ŋ/ (e.g. ngipon, "teeth" and ngano, "why").

The acute accent, the grave accent, and the circumflex are used in the same ways as in the Filipino orthography, whereas the macron is sometimes used for long vowels.

There exists a standardized orthography for Cebuano, published in the book Giya sa Ortograpiyang Sinugbuánong Binisayâ (Sebwáno) in 2022. Standard Cebuano is based on the Carcar-Dalaguete dialect (also historically known as the Sialo dialect) in southeastern Cebu, which was adopted by the Catholic Church in early Latin script transcriptions of the Cebuano language. The spelling rules of Standard Cebuano is usually applied regardless of how it is actually spoken by the speaker. For example, baláy ("house") is pronounced /baˈl̪aɪ/ in Standard Cebuano and is thus spelled "baláy", even in Urban Cebuano where it is actually pronounced /ˈbaɪ/. Another example is in Boholano Cebuano, where its characteristic /dʒ/ sound is still written as 'y' not 'j'.

An exception to this are dialects which replace the 'l' with 'w', in which case it is usually written as 'w'. For example, Standard Cebuano lalom ("deep"), becomes lawom in Urban Cebuano.

The letters 'i' and 'u' can also sometimes be interchanged with 'e' and 'o' (and vice versa), especially in the final syllable. This is due to the fact that historically, Cebuano did not distinguish between these sounds.

Other than the use of Standard Cebuano spellings, different Cebuano-language publications also have varying internal guidelines for spelling, syntax, morphology, style, and usage that they use.

== Vocabulary ==
Cebuano shares many cognates with other Austronesian languages and its descendants. Early trade contact resulted in the adoption of loanwords from Malay (despite belonging in the same language family) like "sulát" ("to write") , "pilak" ("silver"), and "balísa" ("anxious"); it also adopted words from Sanskrit like "bahandì" ("wealth, goods, riches") from "भाण्ड, bhānda" ("goods"), and bása ("to read") is taken from "वाचा, vācā" ("sacred text") and Arabic like the word "alam" ("to know") is said to be borrowed from Arabic "عَالَم, ʕālam" ("things, creation, existing before"), and "salamat" ("expression of gratitude, thanks, thank you") from "سَلَامَات, salāmāt" ("plural form of salāma, meaning "good health"), both of which were indirectly transmitted to Cebuano through Malays.

The biggest component of loanwords that Cebuano uses is from Spanish, being more culturally influenced by Spanish priests from the late 16th century and invigorated by the opening of the Suez Canal in the 1860s that encouraged European migrations to Asia, most notably its numeral system. English words are also used extensively in the language and mostly among the educated ones, even sometimes using the English word rather than the direct Cebuano. For example, instead of saying "magpalít" ("to buy", in future tense), speakers would often say "mag-buy".

=== Numbers ===
Currently, the native system is mostly used as cardinal numbers and more often as ordinal numbers, and the Spanish-derived system is used in monetary and chronological terminology and is also commonly used in counting from 11 and above, though both systems can be used interchangeably regardless. The table below shows the comparison of native numerals and Spanish-derived numerals, but observably Cebuano speakers would often just use the English numeral system instead, especially for numbers more than 100.

The language uses a base-ten numeral system, thence the sets of ten are ultimately derived from the unit except the first ten which is "napulò", this is done by adding a prefix ka-, then followed by a unit, and then the suffix -an. For example, 20 is spoken as ka-duhá-an (lit. "the second set of ten"). The numbers are named from one to ten, for values after ten, it is spoken as a ten and a unit. For example, 11 is spoken as "napulò ug usá", shortened to "napulò'g usá" (lit. "ten and one"), 111 is spoken as "usa ka gatós, napulò ug usá", and 1111 is spoken as "usá ka libo, usá ka gatós, napulò ug usá". The ordinal counting uses the prefix ika-, and then the unit, except for "first" which is "una". For example, ika-duhá means "second".

=== Sample text ===
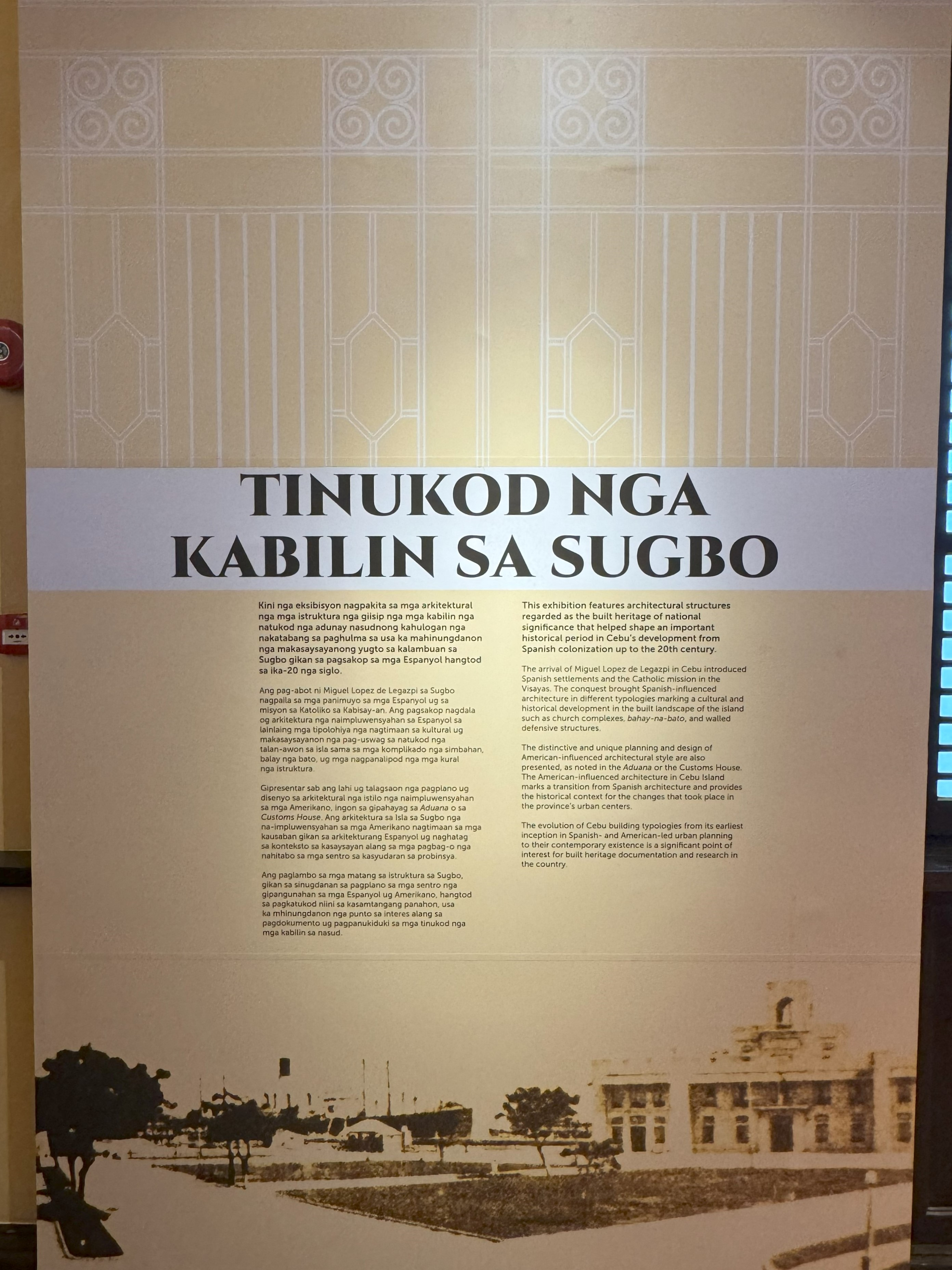
An exhibit at the National Museum of the Philippines in Cebu using the Cebuano language with English translation

Below is the official translation of Article 1 of the Universal Declaration of Human Rights taken from the official United Nations website:

Cebuano

Ang tanáng katawhan gipakatawo nga adunay kagawasan ug managsama sa kabililhon. Silá gigasahan sa pangisip ug tanlag ug kinahanglang mag-ilhanáy sa usá'g-usá dihâ sa diwà sa panág-higsuonáy.

Translation:
English

All human beings are born free and equal in dignity and rights. They are endowed with reason and conscience and should act towards one another in a spirit of brotherhood.

And below is the official translation of the Lord's Prayer.

Cebuano (taken from the official prayer of Minor Basilica of the Holy Child of Cebu)

Amahán namò nga anaa sa mga langit, pagdaygon ang imong ngalan, umabót kanamò ang imong gingharian, matuman ang imong pagbuót, dinhí sa yutà maingón sa langit. Ang kalan-on namò sa matag adlaw, ihatag kanamò karóng adlawa.
Ug pasayloa kamí sa among mga salâ, ingón nga nagapasaylo kamí sa mga nakasalâ kanamò. Ug dilì mo kamí itugyan sa panuláy, hinunua luwasá kamí sa daután. Amen.

Translation:
English (taken from Matthew 6: 9–13 from the New International Version)

Our Father in heaven, hallowed be your name, your kingdom come, your will be done, on earth as it is in heaven. Give us today our daily bread. And forgive us our debts, as we also have forgiven our debtors. And lead us not into temptation, but deliver us from the evil one. Amen.

=== Sample phrases ===
English	Cebuano
Hello.	Kumusta.
Yes.	Oo/O.
Yes please.	Oo/O, palihug.
No.	Dilì/Di
No thanks.	Ayáw lang, salamat.
Please.	Palihug / lihog (casual)
Thank you.	Salamat kanimo.
Thank you very much.	Daghan kaayong salamat.
You're welcome.	Walá'y sapayán.
I'd like a coffee please.	Gusto ko'g kapé, palihug.
Two beers please.	Duhá ka serbesa, palihug.
Excuse me.	Ekskiyus sâ ko. / Isdog (casual)
What time is it?	Unsa na'ng orasa?
Can you repeat that please?	Balika ganì 'to, palihug?
Please speak slowly.	Palihug hinaya pagsulti.
I don't understand.	Walâ ko kasabót.
Sorry.	Pasaylo-a/Pasensya.
Where are the toilets?	Hain dapít ang kasilyas?
How much is this?	Tag-pila man kiní?/Tag-pila ni?
Welcome!	Dayón!
Good morning.	Maayong buntag.
Good afternoon.	Maayong hapon.
Good evening.	Maayong gabii.
Good night.	Maayong pagtulog.
Goodbye.	Babay/Amping.

=== Additional words ===
- Handuraw, "the power to imagine," "to reminisce," or "flashback"

== Dialects ==
Cebuano is spoken natively over a large area of the Philippines and thus has numerous regional dialects. It can vary significantly in terms of lexicon and phonology depending on where it is spoken. Increasing usage of spoken English (being the primary language of commerce and education in the Philippines) has also led to the introduction of new pronunciations and spellings of old Cebuano words. Code-switching forms of English and Bisaya (Bislish) are also common among the educated younger generations.

There are four main dialectal groups within Cebuano aside from Standard Cebuano and Urban Cebuano. They are as follows:

=== Boholano ===
The Boholano dialect of Bohol shares many similarities with the southern form of Standard Cebuano. It is also spoken in some parts of Siquijor and parts of Northern Mindanao. Boholano, especially as spoken in central Bohol, can be distinguished from other Cebuano variants by a few phonetic changes:

- The semivowel y is pronounced [dʒ]: iyá is pronounced [iˈdʒa];
- Akó is pronounced as [aˈho];
- Intervocalic l is occasionally pronounced as [w] when following u or o: kulang is pronounced as [ˈkuwaŋ] (the same as Metro Cebu dialect).

=== Leyte ===
==== Southern Kanâ ====
Southern Kanâ is a dialect of both southern Leyte and Southern Leyte provinces; it is closest to the Mindanao Cebuano dialect at the southern area and northern Cebu dialect at the northern boundaries. Both North and South Kana are subgroups of Leyteño dialect. Both of these dialects are spoken in western and central Leyte and in the southern province, but Boholano is more concentrated in Maasin City.

==== Northern Kanâ ====
Northern Kanâ (found in the northern part of Leyte), is closest to the variety of the language spoken in northern part of Leyte, and shows significant influence from Waray-Waray, quite notably in its pace which speakers from Cebu find very fast, and its more mellow tone (compared to the urban Cebu City dialect, which Kana speakers find "rough"). A distinguishing feature of this dialect is the reduction of /A/ prominent, but an often unnoticed feature of this dialect is the labialisation of /n/ and /ŋ/ into /m/, when these phonemes come before /p/, /b/ and /m/, velarisation of /m/ and /n/ into /ŋ/ before /k/, /ɡ/ and /ŋ/, and the dentalisation of /ŋ/ and /m/ into /n/ before /t/, /d/ and /n/ and sometimes, before vowels and other consonants as well.

Sugbu	Kanâ	Waray	English
kan-on	lutò	lutò	cooked rice/maize
kiní/kirí	kirí/kiní	iní	this
kan	karâ/kanâ	itón	that
dinhí/dirí	arí/dinhí/dirí	didí/ngadí/aadi/dinhi	here
dihâ/dinhâ	dirâ/dihâ/dinhâ	didâ/ngadâ/aadâ	there
bas/balás	bas/balás	barás	soil/sand
alsa	arsa	alsa	to lift
bulsa	bursa	bulsa	pocket

=== Mindanao ===
This is the variety of Cebuano spoken throughout most of Mindanao, and it is the standard dialect of Cebuano in Northern Mindanao, though it also has some unique regional varieties.

==== Davaoeño ====
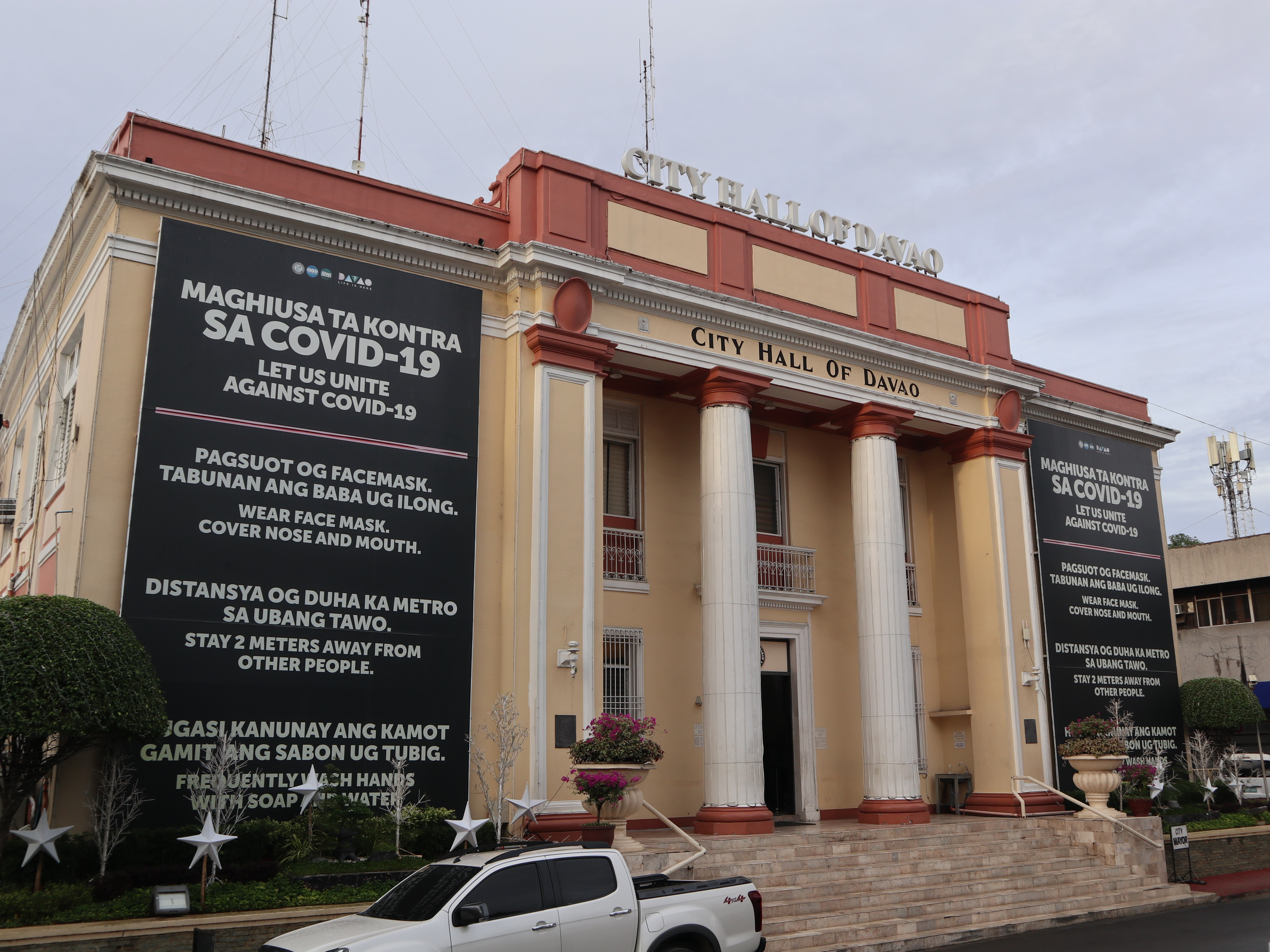
Public health safety reminders on the city hall of Davao

A branch of Mindanaoan Cebuano in Davao is also known as Davaoeño (not to be confused with the Davao variant of Chavacano which is called "Castellano Abakay"). Like the Cebuano of Luzon, it contains some Tagalog vocabulary, which speakers may use even more frequently than in Luzon Cebuano. Its grammar is similar to that of other varieties; however, current speakers exhibit uniquely strong Tagalog influence in their speech by substituting most Cebuano words with Tagalog ones. This is because the older generations speak Tagalog to their children (especially migrants from Luzon) in home settings, and Cebuano is spoken in other everyday settings, making Tagalog the secondary lingua franca. One characteristic of this dialect is the practice of saying atà, derived from Tagalog yatà, to denote uncertainty in a speaker's aforementioned statements. For instance, a Davaoeño might say "Tuá man atà sa baláy si Manuel" instead of "Tuá man tingáli sa baláy si Manuel". The word atà does exist in Cebuano, though it means 'squid ink' in contrast to Tagalog (e.g. atà sa nukos).

Other examples include: Nibabâ ko sa jeep sa kanto, tapos niulî ko sa among baláy ("I got off the jeepney at the street corner, and then I went home") instead of Ninaog ko sa jeep sa eskina, dayon niulî ko sa among baláy. The words babâ and naog mean "to disembark" or "to go down", kanto and eskina mean "street corner", while tapos and dayon mean "then"; in these cases, the former word is Tagalog, and the latter is Cebuano. Davaoeño speakers may also sometimes add Bagobo or Mansakan vocabulary to their speech, as in "Madayawng adlaw, amigo, kumusta ka?" ("Good day, friend, how are you?", literally "Good morning/afternoon") rather than "Maayong adlaw, amigo, kumusta ka?" The words madayaw and maayo both mean 'good', though the former is Bagobo and the latter Cebuano.

One of the famous characteristics of this dialect is disregarding the agreement between the verb "To go (Adto, Anha, Anhi, Ari)" and locative demonstratives (Didto, Dinha, Dinhi, Diri) or the distance of the object/place. In Cebu Cebuano dialect, when the verb "to go" is distal (far from both the speaker and the listener), the locative demonstrative must be distal as well (e.g. Adto didto. Not "Adto diri" or "Anha didto"). In Davaoeño Cebuano on the other hand does not necessarily follow that grammar. Speakers tend to say Adto diri instead of Ari diri probably due to grammar borrowing from Hiligaynon because kadto/mokadto is the Hiligaynon word for "come" or "go" in general regardless the distance.

=== Negros ===
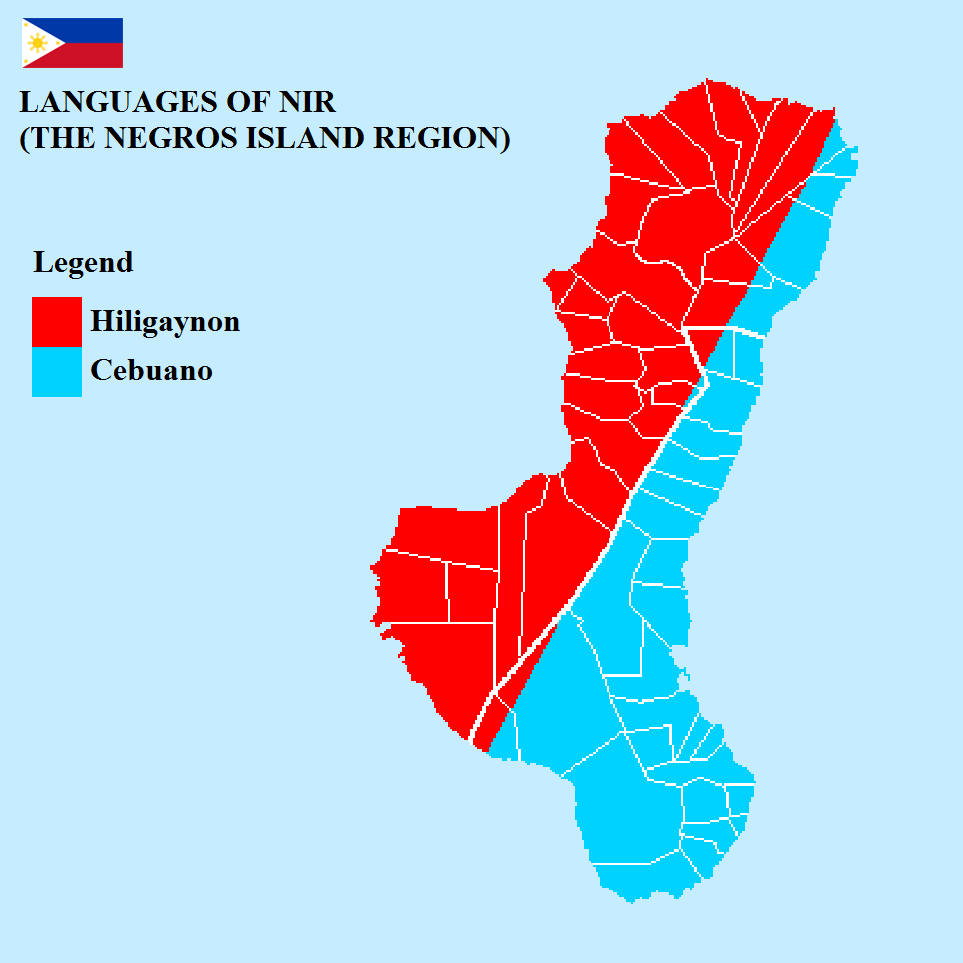
Language map showing the Negros Island almost separating the two provinces (Negros Occidental and Negros Oriental) linguistically

The Cebuano dialect in Negros is somewhat similar to Standard Cebuano (spoken by the majority of the provincial areas of Cebu), with distinct Hiligaynon influences. It is distinctive in retaining /l/ sounds and longer word forms as well. It is the primary dialectal language of the entire province of Negros Oriental and northeastern parts of Negros Occidental (while the majority of the latter province and its bordered areas speaks Hiligaynon/Ilonggo), as well as some parts of Siquijor. Examples of Negrense Cebuano's distinction from other Cebuano dialects is the usage of the word maot instead of batî ("ugly"), alálay, kalálag instead of kalag-kalag (Halloween), kabaló/kahibaló and kaágo/kaantígo instead of kabawó/kahíbawó ("know").

=== Luzon ===
There is no specific Luzonian dialect of Cebuano, as speakers of Cebuano in Luzon come from many different regions in Central Visayas and Mindanao. Cebuano-speaking people from Luzon can be easily recognized in the Visayas primarily by their vocabulary, which incorporates Tagalog words. Their accents and some aspects of their grammar can also sometimes exhibit Tagalog influence. Such Tagalog-influenced Cebuano dialects are sometimes colloquially known as "Bisalog" (a portmanteau of Tagalog and Bisaya).

=== Saksak sinagol ===
The term saksak sinagol in context means "a collection of miscellaneous things" or literally "inserted mixture", thus the few other Cebuano-influenced regions that have a variety of regional languages use this term to refer to their dialects with considerable incorporated Cebuano words. Examples of these regions can be found in places like Masbate.

== Example text ==
Article 1 of the Universal Declaration of Human Rights in Cebuano:

Ang tanang katawhan gipakatawo nga may kagawasan ug managsama sa kabililhon. Sila gigasahan sa salabutan ug tanlag og mag-ilhanay isip managsoon sa usa'g-usa diha sa diwa sa ospiritu.

Article 1 of the Universal Declaration of Human Rights in English:

All human beings are born free and equal in dignity and rights. They are endowed with reason and conscience and should act towards one another in a spirit of brotherhood.

== See also ==
- Boholano dialect
- Cebuano grammar
- Cebuano literature
- Cebuano people
- Classical Cebuano
- Hiligaynon language
- Jacinto Alcos
- Languages of the Philippines
- Cebuano Wikipedia
