= Pigafetta's dictionary =

Italian–Malay vocabulary (16th century)

Pigafetta's dictionary is the first Italian–Malay vocabulary written by the chronicler Antonio Pigafetta. These are the list words of the languages of various natives he met during his journey with Ferdinand Magellan.

== Background ==
The Portuguese explorer Ferdinand Magellan led about 270 men on five ships from Spain to look for the Spice Islands of Maluku. The Venetian chronicler Antonio Pigafetta participated in the expedition and served as an assistant to Magellan. He kept a detailed, daily journal of the voyage. He was one of only 18 men who returned to Spain in 1522.

One of his notable works in the voyage was his narrative and the list of words of various languages of natives during the long journey which includes: Brazilian native language – 8 words, Patagonian language – 90 words, Philippine language – 160 words, Malay – more than 400 words, which Pigafetta calls "Moorish."

In Pigafetta's book, Primo viaggio intorno al mondo (English: First Voyage Around the World), he takes care to record as many words as he can. The chronicle of Pigafetta was one of the most cited documents by historians who wished to study the precolonial Philippines. As one of the earliest written accounts, Pigafetta was seen as a credible source for a period, which was prior unchronicled and undocumented.

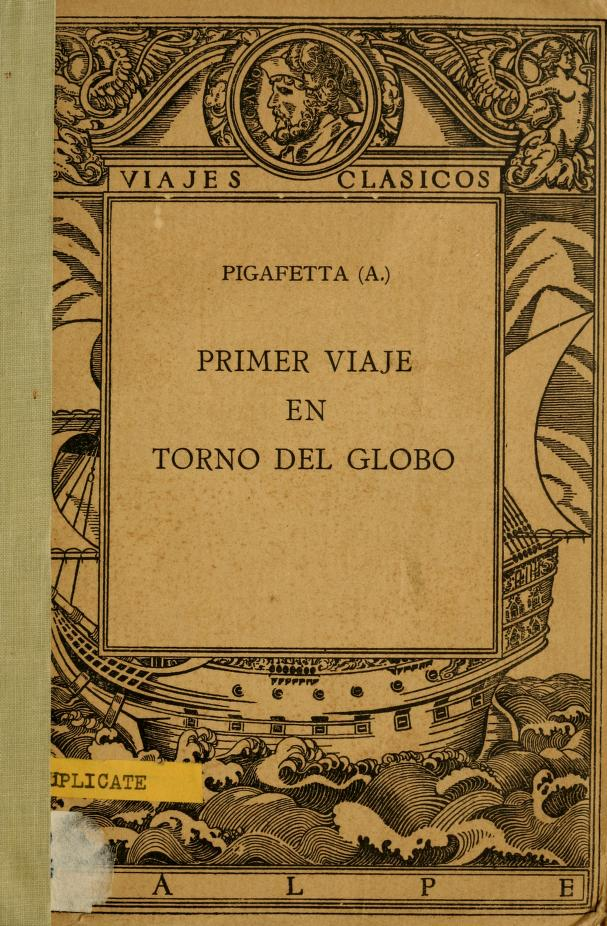
Primer viaje en torno del globo (1522)

== Some list of words ==
Some words from (Brazil) Verzin
Italian	English	List (Pigafetta)
AL miglio	Millet	maiz
Alla farina	Flour	hui
AL hamo	Fishhook	pinda
AL cortello	Knife	tacse
Al petine	Comb	chigap
Alla forfice	Scissors	pirame
AL ſonaglio	Bell	Jtanmaracz
Buono piu q̃ bono	Good, better	tum maragathum

Words of the Patagonian giants
Italian	English	List (Pigafetta)
AL capo	Head	her
aL ochio	Eye	other
AL nazo	Nose	or
Alle cillie	Eyebrows	occhecheL
ALe palpebre	Eyelids	SechechieL
Ali bussi deL nazo	Nostrils	oresche
ALa boca	Mouth	xiam
Ali Labri	Lips	Schiahame
Ali denti	Teeth	phor
ALa linga	Tongue	SchiaL
AL mento	Chin	Sechen
A li pelli	Hair	archiz
AL volto	Face	cogecheL
Ala golo	Throat	ohumez
ALa copa	Occiput	Schialeschin
ALe ſpalle	Shoulders	pelles
AL gomedo	Elbow	CoteL
ALa man	Hand	chene
ALa palma de Laman	Palm of the hand	Caimeghin
AL dito	Finger	Cori
Ale orechie	Ears	Sane
Soto eL broço	Armpit	Salischin
Ala mamela	Teat	othen
AL peto	Bosom	ochij
AL corpo	Body	gecheL
AL menbro	Penis	ſachet
Ali teſticuli	Testicles	Sacancas
Ala natura de le donne	Vagina	Jsse
AL vzar cõ eſſe	Communication with women	Jo hoi
ALe coſſe	Thighs	chiane
AL genochio	Knee	tepin
AL chulo	Rump	Schiaguen
Ale culate	Buttocks	hoij
AL brazo	Arm	maz
AL polso	Pulse	holion
A le gambe	Legs	coss
AL piede	Foot	thee
AL calcagno	Heel	tere
ALa chauequie deL pie	for Ankle	perchi
Ala ſola deL pie	for Sole of the foot	caotſcheni
Ale onguie	for Fingernails	Colim
AL core	for Heart	thoL
AL gratare	for to Scratch	gechare
Al homo ſguerco	or Cross-eyed man	Calischen
AL giuane	for Young man	Calemi
AL hacqua	for Water	holi
AL fuoco	for Fire	ghialeme
AL fumo	Smoke	giaiche
Al no	for No	ehen
AL si	for Yes	Rey
AL oro	Gold	pelpeli
ALe petre lazure	Lapis lazuli	Secheg
AL solle	Sun	Calexcheni
Alle ſtelle	Stars	ſettere
AL mare	Sea	Aro
AL vento	Wind	oni
ALa fortuna	Storm	ohone
AL peſse	Fish	hoi
AL mangiare	to Eat	mechiere
ALa ſcutella	Bowl	elo
ALa pigniata	Pot	aschanie
AL demandare	to Ask	ghelhe
Vien qui	Come here	hai si
AL gardar	to Look	chonne
AL andar	to Walk	Rey
AL Combater	to Fight	oamaghce
Ale freze	Arrows	Sethe
AL Cane	Dog	holL
AL lupo	Wolf	Ani
AL andare longi	for to Go a long distance	Schien
ALa guida	Guide	anti
ALa neue	Snow	theu
AL courire	to Cover	hiani
AL Seruzo ucelo	for Ostrich, a bird	hoihoi
A li sui oui	for its Eggs	Jani
Ala poluere derba che mangião	for the powder of the herb which they eat	Capac
AL odorare	to Smell	os
AL papagalo	Parrot	cheche
ALa gabiota ucelo	Birdcage	Cleo
AL misiglioni	Misiglioni	Siameni
AL panno roſso	Red Cloth	Terechae
AL bonet	for Cap	AicheL
Al colore nego	Black	AineL
AL roſso	Red	taiche
AL gialo	Yellow	peperi
r to Cook	yrocoles	
ALa cintura	Belt	Catechin
AL ocha	Goose	cache
AL diauolo grande	for their big Devil	Setebos
Ali picoli	for their small Devils	cheleule

Below are some list of words as translated by Pigafetta on the third column, fourth column is the equivalent Philippine language that can be found from Diccionario bisaya-español y español-bisaya (Manila, 1885) by Juan Félix de la Encarnación and from Diccionario Hispano-bisaya y bisaya-español (Manila, 1895) by Antonio Sanchez de la Rosa and/or the equivalent Visayan word. It is regarded as the first European record of the Cebuano language and the oldest dictionary in the Philippines. Some words can be distinguished as Malay.

Words from what he describes as heathen people (Philippines/Bisayan languages)
Italian	English	List (Pigafetta)	Classical Cebuano (Encarnación/Sanchez)	Cebuano
AL homo	For Man	lac	lalaqui	lalaki
ALa donna	for Woman	paranpaon		
ALa Jouene	for Young woman	beni beni	binibini	binibini
Ala maritata	for Married woman	babay	babaye	babaye
Ali capilli	for Hair	bo ho	bohóc	buhok
AL vizo	for Face	guay	bayhon	dagway
Ale palpebre	for Eyelids	pilac	pilik (mata)	pilok
Ale ciglie	for Eyebrows	chilei	quilay/quiray	kilay
Al ocquio	for Eye	matta	mata	mata
AL nazo	for Nose	Jlon	ilong/irong	ilong
Ale maſſelle	for Jaws	apin	aping	aping
Ali labri	for Lips	oloL		
A la bocca	for Mouth	baba	ba-ba	ba-ba
A li denti	for Teeth	nipin	ngipon	ngipon
Ale gengiue	for Gums	leghex	lagos/lagus	lagos
Ala linga	for Tongue	dilla	dila	dila
Alle orechie	for Ears	delengan	dalonggan/doronggan	dalunggan
Ala gola	for Throat	liogh	liog	liog
AL collo	for Neck	tangip		
AL mento	for Chin	q̃ilan		sulang
ALa barba	for Beard	bonghot	bongot	bungot
Ale ſpalle	for Shoulders	bagha	abaga	abaga
A la ſchena	for Spine	licud	licod	likod
AL peto	for Breast	dughan	doghan/dughan	dughan
AL corpo	for Body	tiam	tian	tiyan
Soto li braci	Armpit	Jlot	iloc/iroc	ilok
AL bracio	for Arm	botchen	botcon/butcon	bukton
AL gomedo	for Elbow	ſico	sico	siko
AL polſo	for Pulse	molanghai		
ALa mano	for Hand	camat	camot/camut	kamot
A la palma de la man	for the Palm of the hand	palan	palad	palad
AL dito	for Finger	dudlo	todlo/tudlo	tudlo
Ala ongia	for Fingernail	coco	coco	kuko
AL Lombelico	for Navel	puſut	posad/posud	pusod
AL membro	for Penis	vtin	otin	utin
Ali teſticoli	for Testicles	boto	boto	buto
Ala natura de le donne	for Vagina	billat	bilat	bilat
AL vzar cõ loro	for to have Communication with women	Jiam		
Ale cullate	for Buttocks	ſamput	sampot	sampot
Ala coſsa	for Thigh	paha	pa-a	paa
AL ginochio	for Knee	tuhud	tohod/tohud	tuhod
AL Schincho	for Shin	baſsag baſsag		
ALa polpa de la gamba	for Calf of the leg	bitis	bitiis/biti-is	bitiis, batiis
ALa cauechia	for Ankle	bolboL	bool bool/boco boco	buolbuol
AL calcagnio	for Heel	tiochid	ticod/ticud	tikod
Ala ſolla deL pie	for Sole of the foot	Lapa lapa	lapa lapa	lapalapa
AL horo	for Gold	balaoan	bulaoan/bulauan	bulawan
AL argento	for Silver	pilla	pilac	pilak
AL Laton	for Brass	concach	calonggaqui	
AL fero	for Iron	butan	pothao/puthao	puthaw
Ale canne dolce	for Sugarcane	tube	tobo/tubo	tubo
AL cuchiaro	for Spoon	gandan		
AL rizo	for Rice	bughax, baras	bugas	bugas
AL melle	for Honey	deghex	dogos/dugos	dugos
ALa cera	for Wax	talho	talo	talo
AL ſalle	for Salt	acin	asin	asin
AL vino	for Wine	tuba nia nipa	toba nga nipa/tuba nga nipa	tuba nga nipa
AL bere	for to Drink	MinuncubiL	moinom	moinom (og tubig)
AL mangiare	for to Eat	maCan	pagcaon, magkaon	mokaon
AL porcho	for Hog	babui	baboy/babuy	baboy
ALa capra	for Goat	candin	canding	kanding
ALa galina	for Chicken	monoch	manoc	manok
AL miglio	for Millet	humas		humay
AL ſorgo	for Sorgo	batat		
AL panizo	for Panicum	dana		
AL peuere	for Pepper	maniſſa	malisa	
Ali garofoli	for Cloves	chianche	sangqui	sangki
ALa Cannella	for Cinnamon	mana	mana	mana
AL gengero	for Ginger	luia	loy-a/luy-a	luy-a
AL ayo	for Garlic	Laxuna	lasona	lasuna
Ali naranſi	for Oranges	acſua		(ang) suha
AL ouo	for Egg	ſilog	itlog/itlug	itlog
AL coco	for Cocoanut	lubi	lobi/lubi	lubi
AL acceto	for Vinegar	zlucha	suca	suka
AL acqua	for Water	tubin	tobig/tubig	tubig
AL fuoco	for Fire	Clayo	calayo	kalayo
AL fumo	for Smoke	assu	aso	aso
AL ſofiare	for to Blow	tigban		
Alle belancie	for Balances	tinban	timbangan	timbang
AL pezo	for Weight	tahiL		
Ala perla	for Pearl	mutiara	mutia	mutya
Ale madre de le perle	for Mother of pearl	tipay	tipay	tipay
Ala zampognia	for Pipe [a musical instrument]	Subin	sobing/subing	subing
AL mal de sto Job	for Disease of St. Job	Alupalan		
portame	Bring me	palatin comorica		umari ka
Acerte fogacie de rizo	for certain Rice cakes	tinapai	tinapay	tinapay
buono	Good	main	maayo/maopay	maayo
Nõ	No	ti da le	dili	dili
AL cortello	for Knife	capol, ſundan	sipol, sondang/sipol, sundang	sipol, sundang
Ale forfice	for Scissors	catle	catli	katla
A tosare	To shave	chunthinch	gunting	gunting
AL homo ben hornato	for a well adorned Man	pixao		
Ala tella	for Linen	balandan	balantan	
A li panni q̃ ſe copreno	for the cloth with which they cover themselves	Abaca	abaca	abaka
AL conaglio	for hawk’sbell	colon colon	colongcolong/goronggorong	
Ali pater nr̃j dogni ſorte	for Pater nosters of all classes	tacle		
AL petine	for Comb	cutlei, miſsamis	surlay/sodlay	sudlay
AL pentinare	for to Comb	monssughud	mansoyod	mangsulod/mangsuyod
ALa Camiza	for Shirt	Sabun	sabong (i.e. ornament)	
ALa gugia de coſire	for Sewing-needle	daghu	dagom/dagum	dagom
AL cuſire	for to Sew	mamis		
A La porcelana	for Porcelain	mobuluc		
AL cana	for Dog	aian, ydo	iro/ayam	ayam, iro
AL gato	for Cat	epos		
Ali ſui veli	for their Scarfs	gapas	gapas	gapas
Ali criſtalini	for Glass Beads	balus		
Vien qi	Come here	marica		umari ka
Ala caza	for House	Jlaga, balai	balay	balay
AL legniame	for Timber	tatamue	tatha	
Alle ſtore doue dormeno	for the Mats on which they sleep	Tagichan	tagican	tagikan
Ale ſtore de palma	for Palm-mats	bani	banig/banag	banig
Ale cuſſini de foglie	for their Leaf cushions	Vliman	olnan/olonan	ulunan/unlan
A li piati de legnio	for Wooden platters	dulan	dolong/dulang	
AL ſuo ydio	for their God	Abba		
AL ſolle	for Sun	adlo	arlao/adlao	adlaw
ALa luna	for Moon	ſonghot, bolan	bulan	bulan
Ala ſtela	for Star	bunthun	bitoon	bituon
ALa aurora	for Dawn	mene		
Ala matina	for Morning	vema	ogma	ugma
Ala taza	for Cup	tagha	tagay	tagay
grande	Large	baſsaL		basol
AL archo	for Bow	boſsugh	bosog	busog
ALa freza	for Arrow	oghon	odyong	udyong
Ali targoni	for Shields	calaſsan	calasag	kalasag
A le veſte inbotide ꝓ combater	for Quilted garments used for fighting	baluti	baloti	baluti
Ale ſue daghe	for their daggers	calix, baladao	calis, baladao/caris, baladao	kalis, balaraw
Ali ſui tertiadi	for their Cutlasses	Campilan	campilan/campilang	kampilan
A la Lancia	for Spear	bancan	bangcao	bangkaw
El talle	for Like	tuan	--/to-ang	
Ali figui	for Figs [i.e., bananas]	ſaghin	saguing	saging
Ale zuche	for Gourds	baghin	bagong	baging
Ale corde dele ſue violle	for the Cords of their violins	gotzap		kudyapi
AL fiume	for River	tau		
AL riſaio ꝓ peſcare	for Fishing-net	pucat laia	laya/raya	pukot, laya
AL batello	for small Boat	ſampan	sampan	sampan
A le canne grande	for large Canes	cauaghan	caoayan/cauayan	kawayan
Ale picole	for the small ones	bonbon	bongbong	
Ale ſue barche grande	for their large Boats	balanghai	balangay/barangay	balangay
Ale ſue barque picolle	for their small Boats	boloto	baloto	baloto, baroto
Ali granci	for Crabs	Cuban	coboa	
AL peſce	for Fish	Jcam yſſida	isda	ikan, isda
A vno peſcie tuto depinto	for a Fish that is all colored	panap ſapã	panapsapan	
A vno alto roſſo	for another red [Fish]	timuan	tiao	
A vno certo alto	for a certain other [kind of Fish]	pilax	pilas	
A vno alto	for another [kind of Fish]	emaluan		
Tuto e vno	All the same	Siama siama	sama-sama	sama
A vno ſchiauo	for a Slave	bonſuL		
A la forca	for Gallows	bolle		
ALa naue	for Ship	benaoa	bangca	bangka
A vno re o capo gñale	for a King or Captain-general	raia	raha;hari/hadi	raya
Vno	one	Vzza	usa	usa
duy	two	dua	doha/duha	duha
tre	three	tolo	tolo	tulo
Quato	four	vpat	opat/upat	upat
Cinque	five	lima	lima	lima
Sey	six	onom	onom/unum	unom
Sette	seven	pitto	pito	pito
octo	eight	gualu	oalo	walo
Noue	nine	Ciam	siam	siyam
Diece	ten	polo	napolo	napulo

== See also ==
- Le langaige du Bresil
