= Antonio Pigafetta =

16th-century Venetian explorer

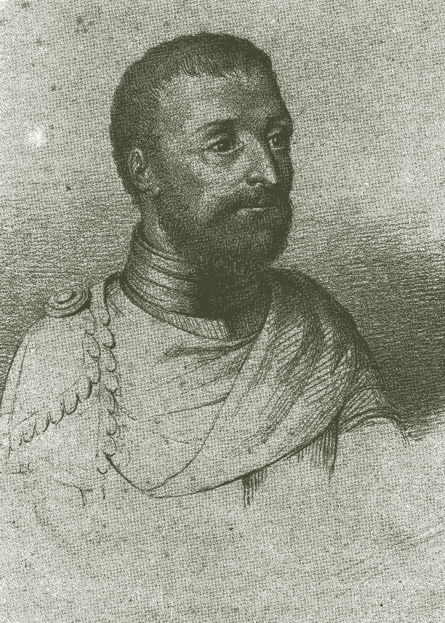
- Portrait of Antonio Pigafetta, Biblioteca Civica Bertoliana, Vicenza
- Born: c. 1492; Vicenza, Republic of Venice (present-day Italy)
- Died: c. 1534; Vicenza, Republic of Venice
- Years active: 1500s–20s
- Known for: Chronicling Magellan's circumnavigation

Antonio Pigafetta (Italian: [anˈtɔːnjo piɡaˈfetta]; c. 1492 – c. 1534) was a Venetian scholar and explorer. In 1519, he joined the Spanish expedition to the Spice Islands led by Portuguese explorer Ferdinand Magellan, the world's first documented circumnavigation, and is best known for being the chronicler of the voyage. During the expedition, he served as Magellan's assistant until Magellan's death in the Philippine Islands, and kept an accurate journal, which later assisted him in translating the Cebuano language. It is the first recorded document concerning the language.

Pigafetta was one of the 18 men who made the complete trip, returning to Spain in 1522, under the command of Juan Sebastián Elcano, out of the approximately 240 who set out three years earlier. These men completed the first circumnavigation of the world while others mutinied and returned in the first year. Pigafetta's surviving journal is the source for much of what is known about Magellan and Elcano's voyage.

== Early life ==
Pigafetta was born to a prominent noble family in the city of Vicenza in northeast Italy. Recent archival research indicates that his father was Giovanni Pigafetta and his mother was a noblewoman named Lucia, daughter of Marco Muzan. The couple was married in March 1492, implying that Antonio was born sometime after that date. Details of his education are unknown but he later boasted of having "read many books".

There is a tradition that as a youth Pigafetta sailed the Mediterranean with the Knights of Rhodes but there is no record of such activity, only the observation that he later became a member of the order. At some point he entered into the service of papal ambassador Francesco Chiericati, an apostolic protonotary and a close associate of Pope Leo X. Like Pigafetta, Chiericati was also from Vicenza. In 1518, Leo X sent Chiericati to the royal court in Spain to serve as ambassador. Pigafetta accompanied the ambassador's retinue, first to Zaragoza for two months and then to Barcelona.

== Voyage around the world ==
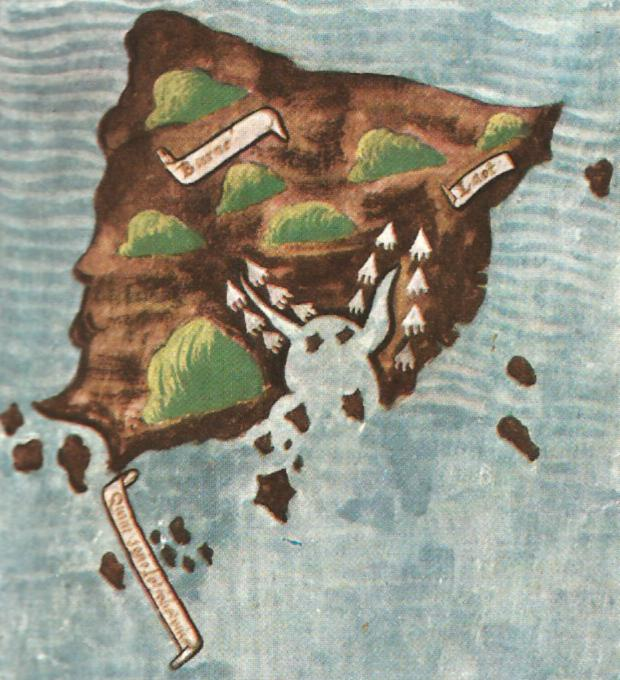
Map of Borneo by Pigafetta.

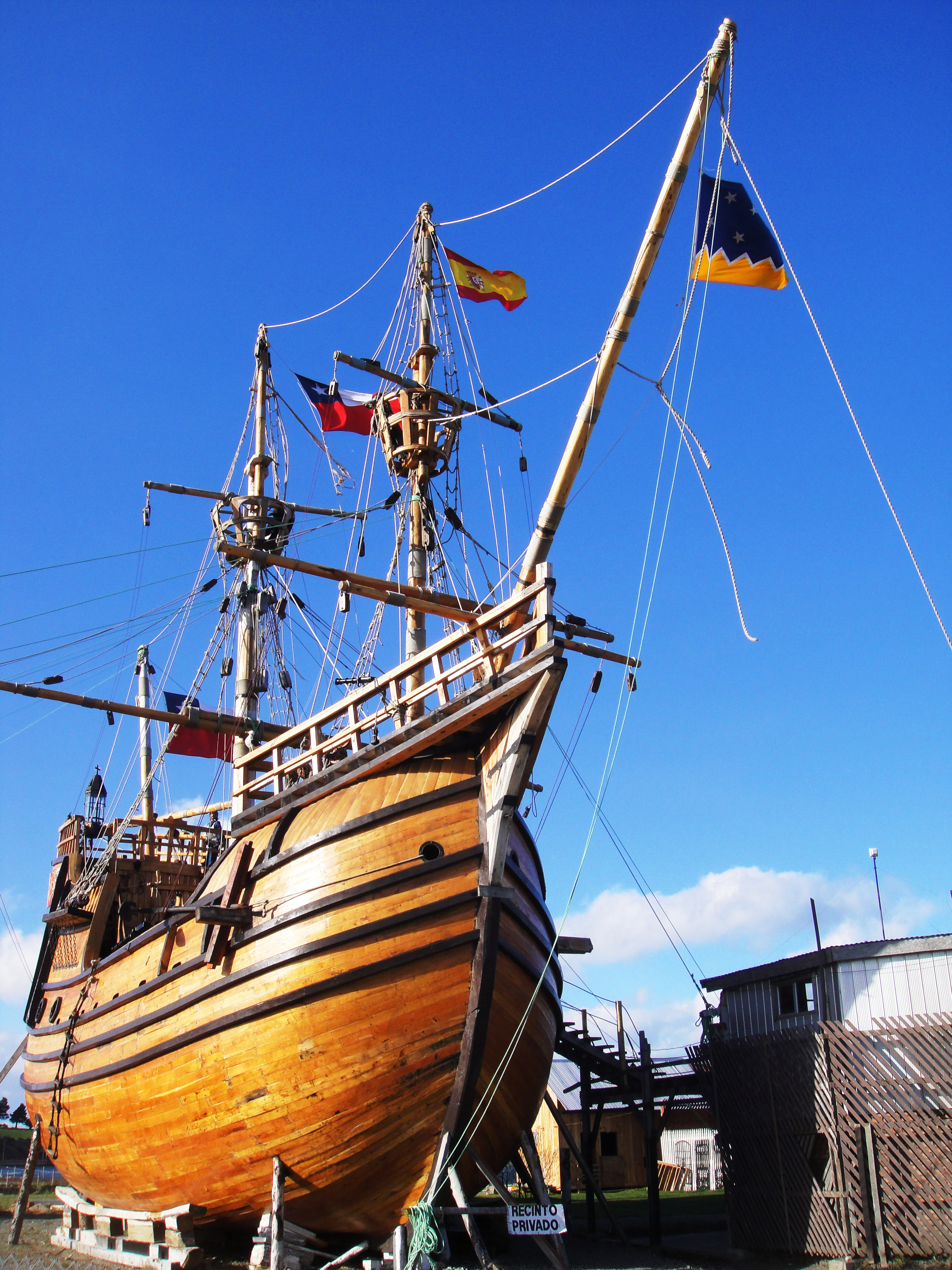
Nao Victoria, Magellan's boat Replica in Punta Arenas

While in Spain, Pigafetta heard of Magellan's planned expedition to find a western route to the Spice Islands. The adventure appealed to him and he convinced Chiericati that his participation on this historic voyage would be advantageous for the Vatican. With the approval of the papal ambassador and King Charles, Pigafetta was provided with letters of introduction before he set out for Seville in May 1519. Magellan accepted his application to join the expedition and hired him for a modest monthly salary of 1,000 maravedís. He was enrolled under the name Antonio Lombardo and his position was described as one of the "servants of the captain and supernumeraries".

When the expedition set sail in August 1519, Pigafetta was assigned to the flagship Trinidad where he served Magellan and became his great admirer. Pigafetta did not appear to have any specific role except to keep a daily record of his observations, a task that he undertook with great diligence. He recorded extensive information concerning the geography, climate, and natural history of the places visited by the expedition. He was especially interested in the native inhabitants encountered along the way and took meticulous notes on their appearance, social customs and languages. In contrast to the accuracy of his personal observations, he had a tendency to accept even the most outrageous tales told to him about the lands they visited.

Pigafetta was wounded on Mactan in the Philippines, where Magellan was killed in the Battle of Mactan in April 1521. Nevertheless, he recovered and was among the 18 who accompanied Juan Sebastián Elcano on board the Victoria on the return voyage to Spain.

== Return ==
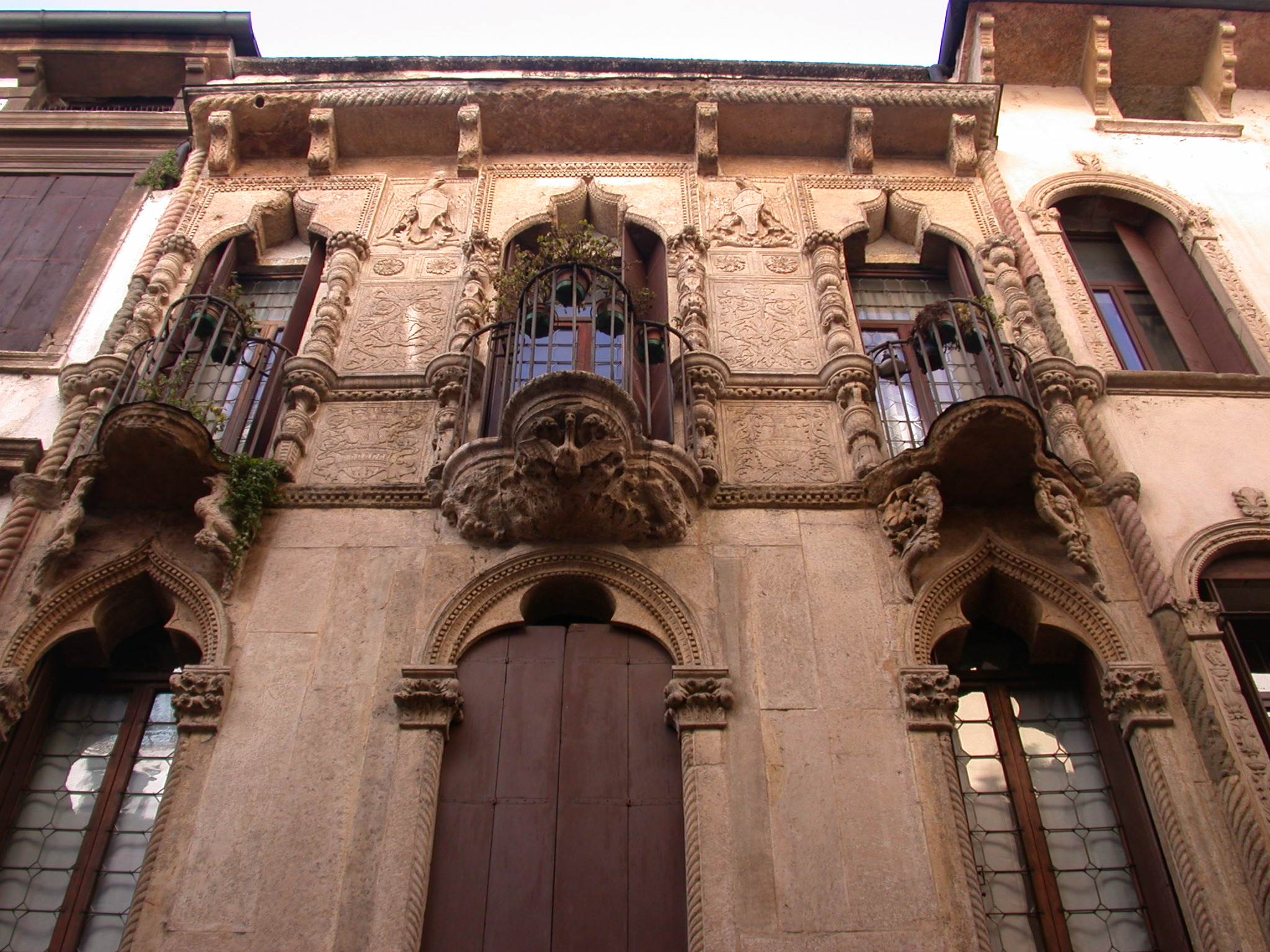
Casa Pigafetta, the family palace in Vicenza.

Upon reaching port in Sanlúcar de Barrameda in the modern Province of Cadiz in September 1522, three years after his departure, Pigafetta returned to the Republic of Venice. He related his experiences in the "Report on the First Voyage Around the World" (Italian: Relazione del primo viaggio intorno al mondo), which was composed in Italian and was distributed to European monarchs in handwritten form before it was eventually published by Italian historian Giovanni Battista Ramusio in 1550–59. The account centers on the events in the Mariana Islands and the Philippines, although it included several maps of other areas as well, including the first known use of the word "Pacific Ocean" (Oceano Pacifico) on a map. The original document was not preserved.

However, it was not through Pigafetta's writings that Europeans first learned of the circumnavigation of the globe. Rather, it was through an account written by a Flanders-based writer, Maximilianus Transylvanus, which was published in 1523. Transylvanus had been instructed to interview some of the survivors of the voyage when Magellan's surviving ship, Victoria, returned to Spain in September 1522 under the command of Juan Sebastian Elcano. After Magellan and Elcano's voyage, Pigafetta utilized the connections he had made prior to the voyage with the Knights of Rhodes to achieve membership in the order.

== The Relazione del primo viaggio intorno al mondo ==
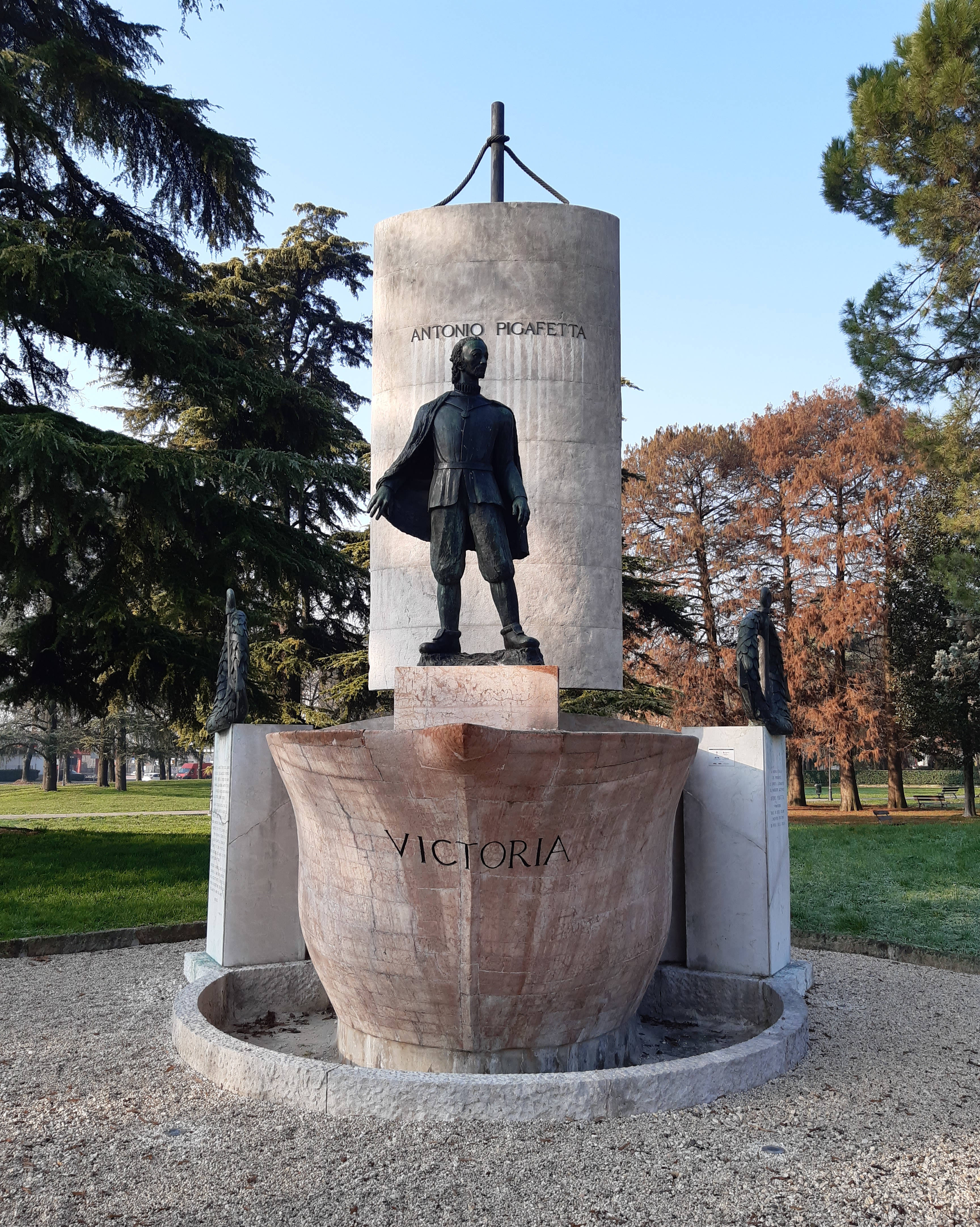
Statue of Antonio Pigafetta in Vicenza

Pigafetta wrote his account of Magellan's expedition, Relazione del primo viaggio intorno al mondo, in Vicenza between late 1523 and January 1524. According to Alberto Magnaghi, the Relazione was written in response to a request from Federico II Gonzaga, the Marquis of Mantua. Although written in semi-chronological order, it does not read as a linear history of the voyage; rather, it is a collection of descriptions, events, translations, thoughts, and illustrations. It has been described by American historian Laurence Bergreen as unusually personal for its time. The original language of Pigafetta's Relazione is a matter of debate. Barbara A. Shailor argues that it was probably written in Italian. According to Bergreen, it might have been written in the author's Venetian dialect, mixed with Spanish and Italian.

Pigafetta presented his work to several European sovereigns and high dignitaries. At the end of his Relazione, he states that he gave copies to Charles V, John III of Portugal, Francis I of France and the Grand Master of the Knights Hospitaller Philippe Villiers de L'Isle-Adam. Other copies were signed over to Federico II Gonzaga and the Mantuan ambassador in Venice Giovanni Battista Malatesta. These early copies of Pigafetta's journal were lavish illuminated manuscripts illustrated with maps of his own devising. Unfortunately, all of these copies have been lost. Pigafetta obtained a printing privilege from the Venetian Senate to publish his diary, and through the mediation of Malatesta, he was put in touch with a Venetian printer. The agreement stipulated that Pigafetta would pay 15 ducats to cover half of the printing costs. Once published, all subsequent profits from book sales were to be divided equally between Pigafetta and the printer. Having returned from his voyage with little wealth, Pigafetta was never able to pay this sum, and the Relazione was never printed during his lifetime.

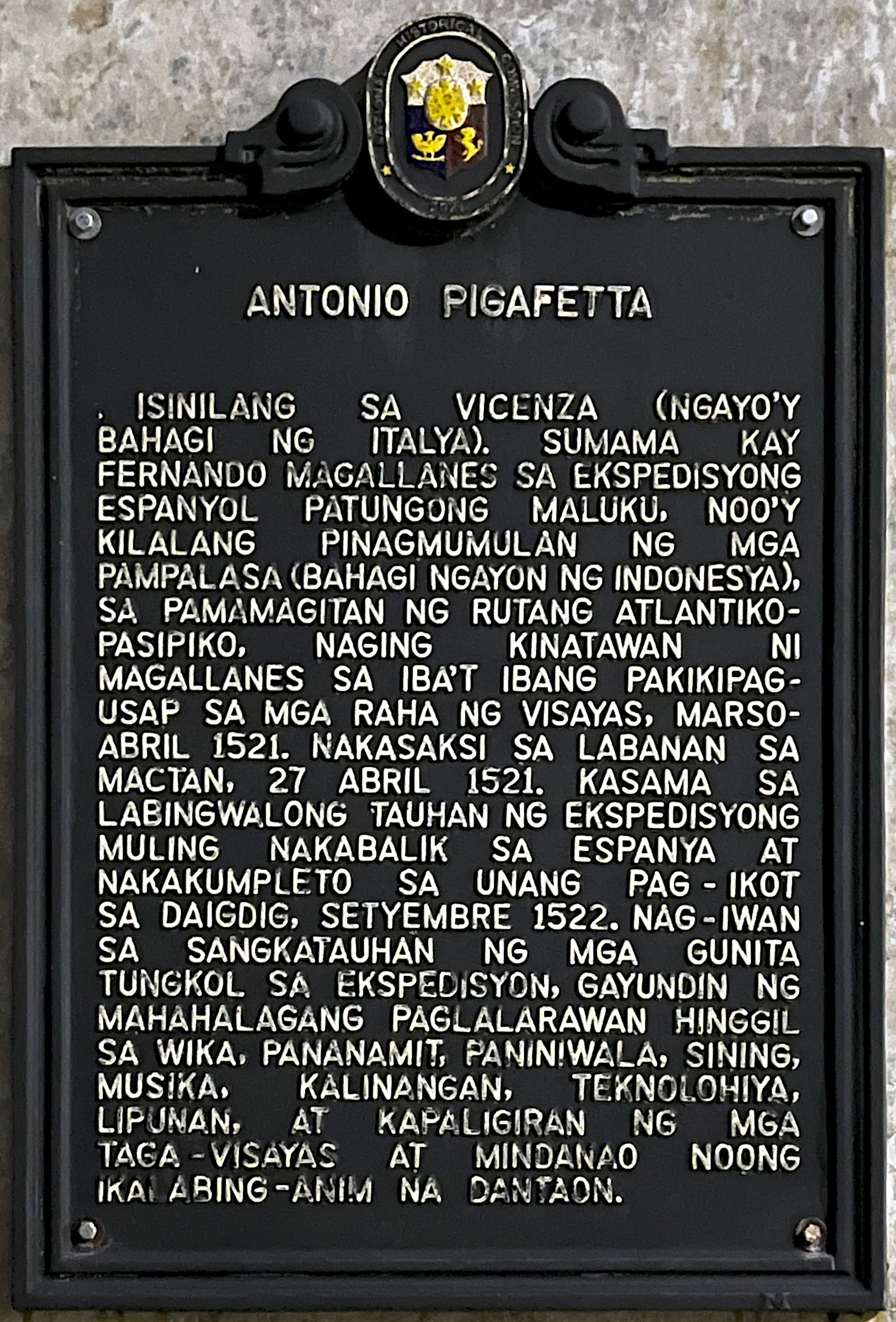
Commemorative plaque placed in Cebu City, Philippines on the 500th anniversary of Magellan's and Pigafetta's arrival

Only four manuscripts of Pigafetta's Relazione survive, none of which is the original. Three of the extant manuscripts are in French and one is in Italian. Two of the French versions are held at the Bibliothèque nationale de France in Paris (Ms. No. 5,650 and Ms. No. 24,224). The older and longer of the two Paris manuscripts (Ms. No. 5,650) is poorly executed and full of erasures. The second (Ms. No. 24,224) was probably copied from the former. The third French version, the Beinecke MS 351, is held at the Beinecke Rare Book and Manuscript Library at Yale. Of the four surviving manuscripts, Beinecke MS 351 is considered the most complete. Shailor dates it to around 1525, close to the time of the original redaction of the Relazione. Yale University Press has published a facsimile edition of the manuscript with an English translation by Raleigh Ashlin Skelton in 1969. Finally, the sole surviving Italian manuscript is kept at the Biblioteca Ambrosiana in Milan (ms. L 103 sup.). According to Alberto Magnaghi:

È escluso ormai che la prima redazione sia stata in francese, ad onta che la prima edizione a stampa, senza data, sia francese: manoscritti ed edizione francesi (quest'ultima soprattutto) risultano traduzioni incomplete per soppressione di qualche parte e spesso anche con termini errati per incomprensione del traduttore, di un originario manoscritto italiano.

[Despite the fact that the first printed edition is in French, it is now ruled out that the original draft was in French. The French manuscripts and printed edition (especially the latter) turn out to be incomplete translations due to the omission of parts of the original Italian manuscript and the use of incorrect terms as a result of mistranslations.]

He goes on to state, "Dei manoscritti, il più completo e che si ritiene più vicino alla redazione originale, sebbene non sia autografo del Pigafetta, è quello della Biblioteca Ambrosiana di Milano" [The manuscript kept at the Biblioteca Ambrosiana in Milan is considered the most complete and closest to the original version, even though it is not in Pigafetta’s own hand].

This manuscript was discovered by Carlo Amoretti, who published the first Italian edition in Milan in 1800 (Primo viaggio intorno al globo terraqueo), followed by a French translation in Paris in 1801. Unfortunately, Amoretti modified many words and sentences in his printed edition, as the original manuscript is written in a bizarre Italo-Venetian language interspersed with Spanish terms. Since Amoretti's edition formed the basis for most of the translations of Pigafetta's journal, the inaccurate and heavily altered text spread globally, causing many early translations in English, French, German and Spanish to replicate his errors and alterations.

Andrea Da Mosto critically analyzed the original version stored in the Biblioteca Ambrosiana, and published a rigorous edition of the text in 1894. Jean Dénucé extensively studied the French versions of Pigafetta's journal, and published a critical edition of the longer of the two Paris manuscripts (Ms. No. 5,650), collated with the other three surviving copies, in 1923.

== Recognition ==
An exhibition on Pigafetta opened in 2019 in Madrid at the library of the Spanish Agency for International Development Cooperation (AECID).

The Italian destroyer Antonio Pigafetta, of the Navigatori class, was named after him in 1931.

The bitypic genus of palms Pigafetta is named in his honor.

== Works ==
Antonio Pigafetta wrote at least two books, both of which have survived:

- Relazione del primo viaggio intorno al mondo (1524-1525);
- Regole sull'arte del navigare (1524-1525) (contained in Andrea Da Mosto, ed. (1894). Il primo viaggio intorno al globo di Antonio Pigafetta e le sue regole sull'arte del navigare.).

== Gallery ==
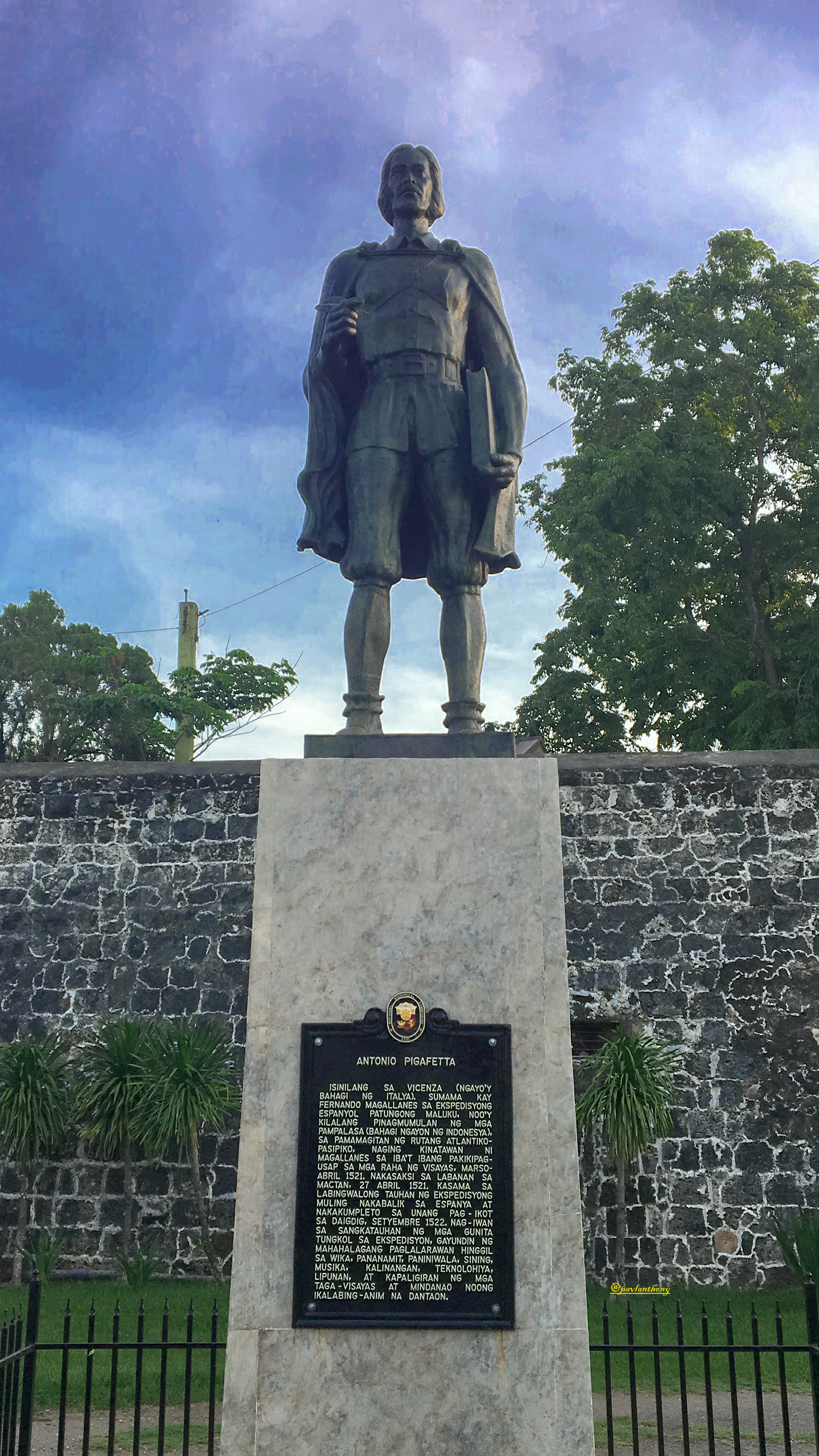
Antonio Pigafetta statue in Cebu City beside Fort San Pedro

Pigafetta’s map of the Strait of Magellan

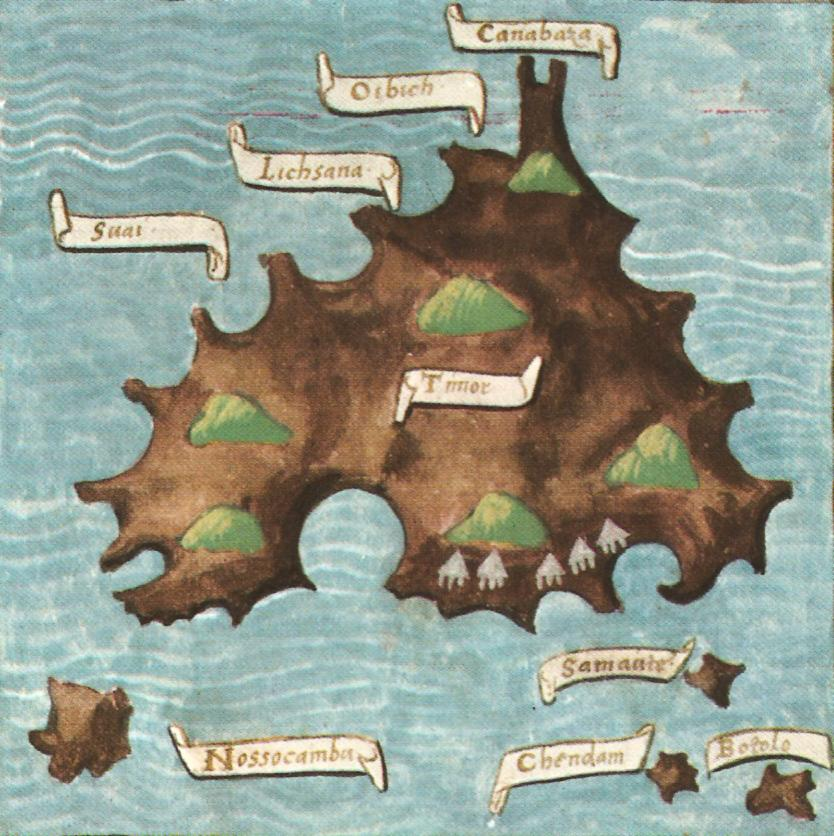
Pigafetta’s map of Timor

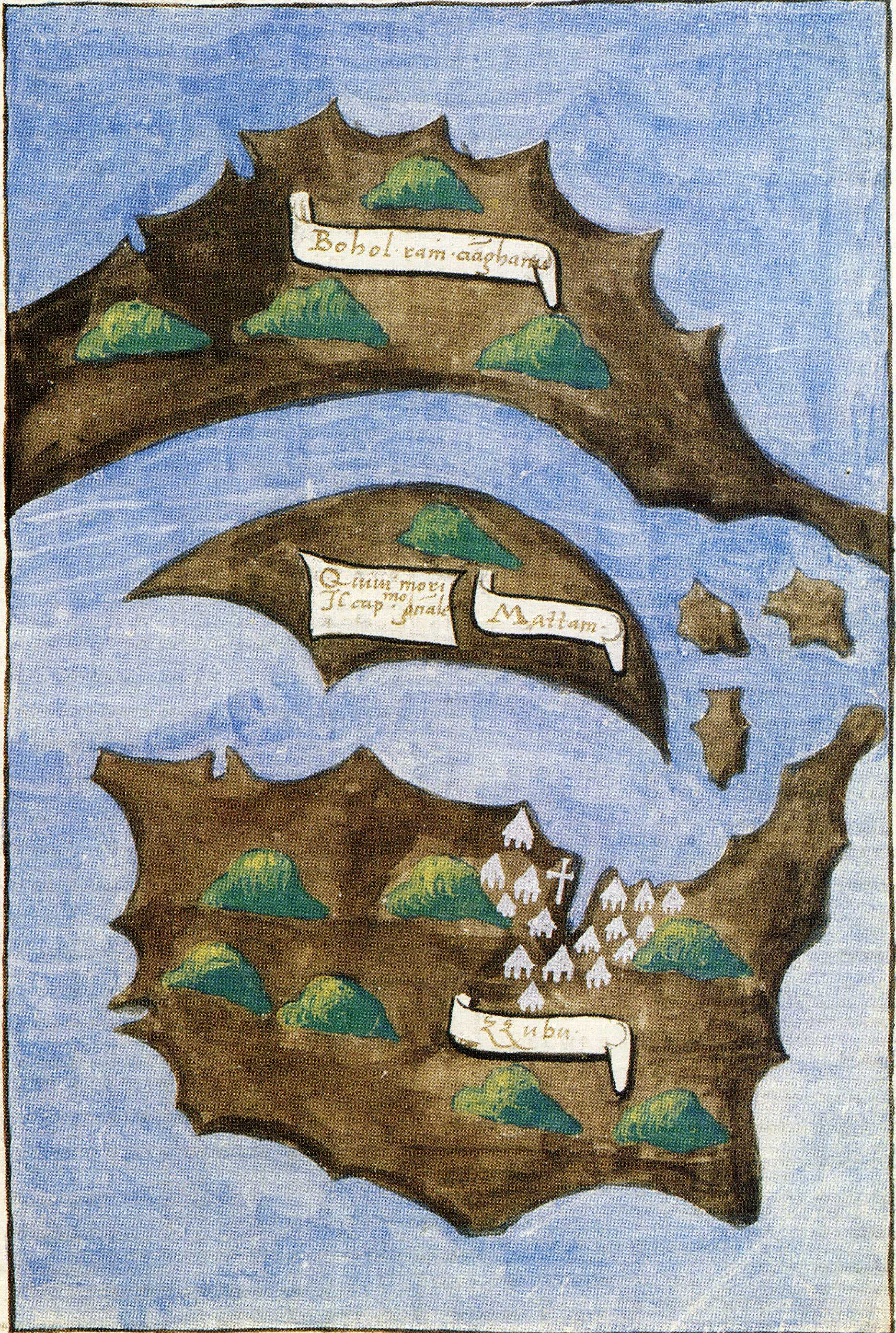
Pigafetta’s map of Cebu

Pigafetta's map of Tidore and some other Maluku Islands

Pigafetta's map of the Islas de los Ladrones

Pigafetta's map of the island of Negros in the Philippines

Pigafetta's map of Central Visayas islands

== Sources ==
- Bergreen, Laurence (2003). Over the Edge of the World: Magellan's terrifying circumnavigation of the globe. New York, NY: Morrow. ISBN 978-0-06-621173-2.
- Cachey, Theodore J. Jr. (2007a). "Pigafetta, Antonio". In Buisseret, David (ed.). The Oxford Companion to World Exploration. Oxford: Oxford University Press. ISBN 978-0-19-514922-7.
- Cachey, Theodore J. Jr, ed. (2007b). Antonio Pigafetta, The First Voyage Around the World, 1519-1522. Toronto: University of Toronto Press. ISBN 978-0-8020-9370-7.
- Joyner, Tim (1992). Magellan. Camden, Me: International Marine. ISBN 978-0-87742-263-1.
- Magellan's Voyage around the World by Antonio Pigafetta – The original text of the Ambrosian ms. translated by James Alexander Robertson, Cleveland : The Arthur H. Clark Company (1906); Vol 1, Vol. 2, Vol. 3
- Magnaghi, Alberto (1935). "Pigafetta, Antonio". Enciclopedia Italiana (in Italian). Rome: Istituto dell'Enciclopedia Italiana.
- Murphy, Patrick J.; Coye, Ray W. (2013). Mutiny and Its Bounty: Leadership Lessons from the Age of Discovery. Yale University Press. ISBN 978-0-300-17028-3. Archived from the original on 2015-06-27.
- Nowell, Charles E, ed. (1962). Magellan's voyage around the world; three contemporary accounts [by] Antonio Pigafetta, Maximilian of Transylvania [and] Gaspar Corrêa. Northwestern University Press.
- Perocco, Daria (2015). "Pigafetta, Antonio". Dizionario Biografico degli Italiani (in Italian). Vol. 83: Piacentini–Pio V. Rome: Istituto dell'Enciclopedia Italiana. ISBN 978-88-12-00032-6.
- Quanchi, Max (2005). Historical Dictionary of the Discovery and Exploration of the Pacific Islands. The Scarecrow Press. p. 207. ISBN 0-8108-5395-7.
- Salonia, Matteo (2022). "Asian Ceremonies and Christian Chivalry in Pigafetta's The First Voyage around the World". In C. Mueller; M. Salonia (eds.). Travel Writings on Asia: Curiosity, Identities, and Knowledge across the East, c. 1200 to the Present. Singapore: Palgrave Macmillan. pp. 83–110. doi:10.1007/978-981-19-0124-9_4. ISBN 978-981-19-0123-2.
- Shailor, Barbara A. (2025). "Beinecke MS 351—France, ca. 1525—Pigafetta, Journal of Magellan's Voyage (in Fr.)". Library.Yale.edu (library catalogue manuscript entry-webpage). Archived from the original on 2025-02-13.
- Stanley, Henry Edward John (1874). The First Voyage Round the World, by Magellan. Hakluyt Society.
- Torodash, Martin (1971). "Magellan Historiography". The Hispanic American Historical Review. LI (2): 313–335. doi:10.2307/2512478. JSTOR 2512478.
