= Hiligaynon language =

Austronesian regional language spoken in the Philippines

Hiligaynon
- Ilonggo
- Hiniligaynon, Inilonggo, Binisayâ
- Native to: Philippines
- Region: Western Visayas, Negros Island Region, Soccsksargen, southwestern portion of Masbate, coastal Palawan, some parts of southern Mindoro, some parts of Romblon and a few parts of Northern Mindanao
- Ethnicity: Hiligaynon
- Native speakers: 8.6 million (2020); 9.1 million total speakers 4th most spoken native language in the Philippines
- Language family: Austronesian: Malayo-Polynesian; Philippine; Greater Central Philippine; Central Philippine; Bisayan; Central Bisayan; Hiligaynon
- Dialects: Standard Hiligaynon (Iloilo province dialect); Urban Hiligaynon (Metro Iloilo dialect); Guimarasnon Hiligaynon; Bacolodnon Hiligaynon (Metro Bacolod dialect); Negrense Hiligaynon (Negros Occidental dialect); Mindanao Hiligaynon
- Writing system: Latin (Hiligaynon alphabet); Hiligaynon Braille; Historically Baybayin (c. 13th–19th centuries)

Official status
- Recognised minority language in: Philippines
- Regulated by: Komisyon sa Wikang Filipino

Language codes
- ISO 639-2: hil
- ISO 639-3: hil
- Glottolog: hili1240
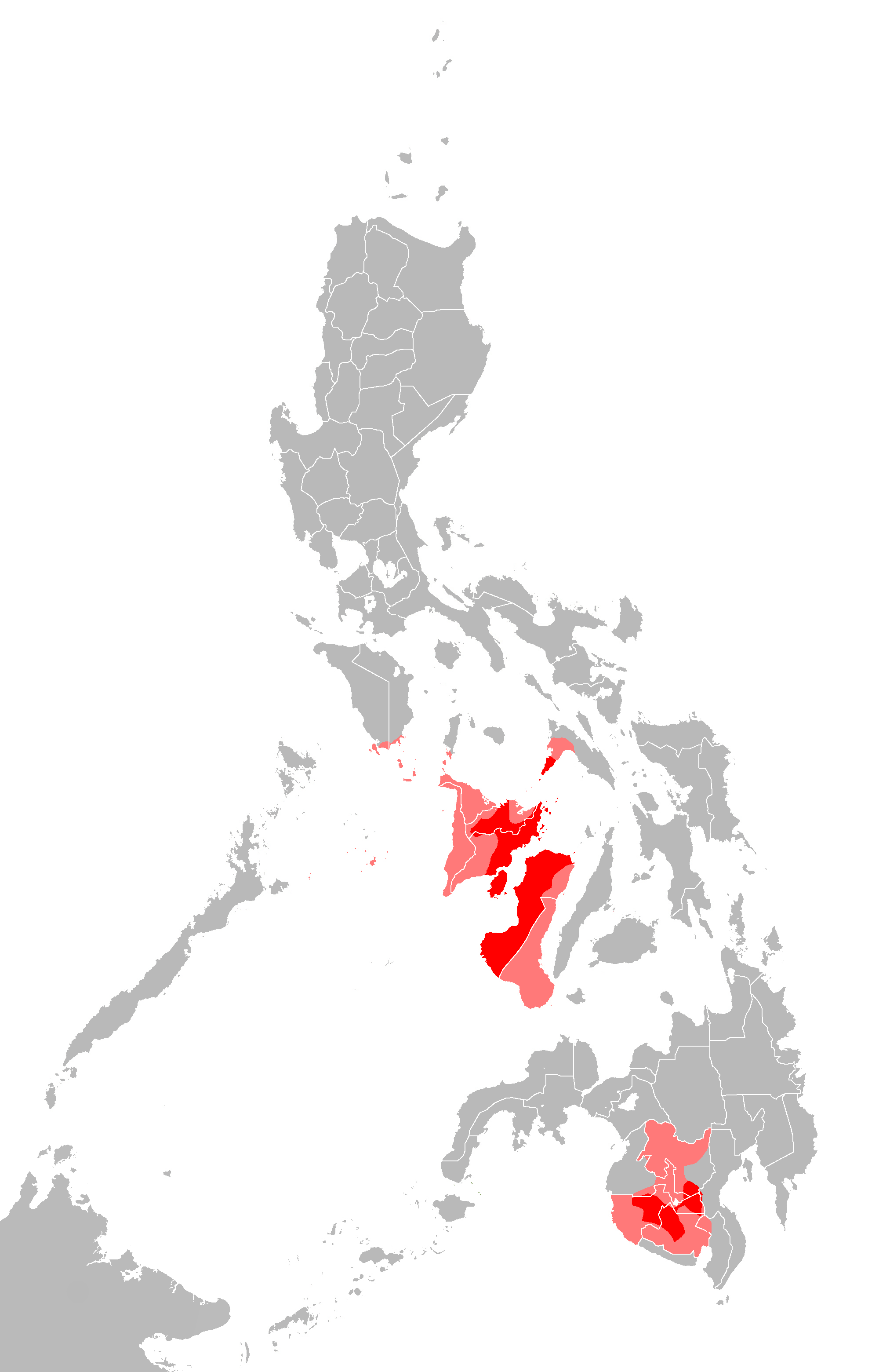
- Areas where Hiligaynon is spoken in the Philippines

Hiligaynon, also often referred to as Ilonggo or Binisayâ/Bisayâ nga Hiniligaynon/Inilonggo, is an Austronesian regional language spoken in the Philippines by about 9.1 million people, predominantly in Panay Island, Negros Occidental, and Soccsksargen, most of whom belong to the Hiligaynon people. It is the second-most widely spoken language in the Visayas and belongs to the Bisayan languages. It is more distantly related to other Philippine languages.

It also has one of the largest native language-speaking populations of the Philippines, despite it not being taught and studied formally in schools and universities until 2012. Hiligaynon is given the ISO 639-2 three-letter code hil, but has no ISO 639-1 two-letter code.

Hiligaynon is mainly concentrated in the regions of Western Visayas (Iloilo, Capiz, and Guimaras), Negros Island Region (Negros Occidental), and Soccsksargen (South Cotabato including General Santos, Sultan Kudarat, and Cotabato). It is spoken in other neighboring provinces, such as Antique and Aklan in Western Visayas, Negros Oriental in Negros Island Region, Masbate in Bicol Region, and southern parts of Mindoro, Romblon and Palawan in Mimaropa.

It is spoken as a second language by Kinaray-a speakers in Antique, Aklanon/Malaynon speakers in Aklan, Capiznon speakers in Capiz, Cebuano speakers in Negros Oriental, and spoken and understood by native speakers of Maguindanaon, Cebuano, Ilocano, Blaan, Tboli and other settler and indigenous languages in Soccsksargen in Mindanao. There are approximately 9,300,000 people in and out of the Philippines who are native speakers of Hiligaynon and an additional 5,000,000 capable of speaking it with a substantial degree of proficiency.

Despite being a somewhat large language in the Philippines, it is sometimes considered a "rare' language online. This is mostly because of a lack of a well-documented way to learn it.

== Nomenclature ==
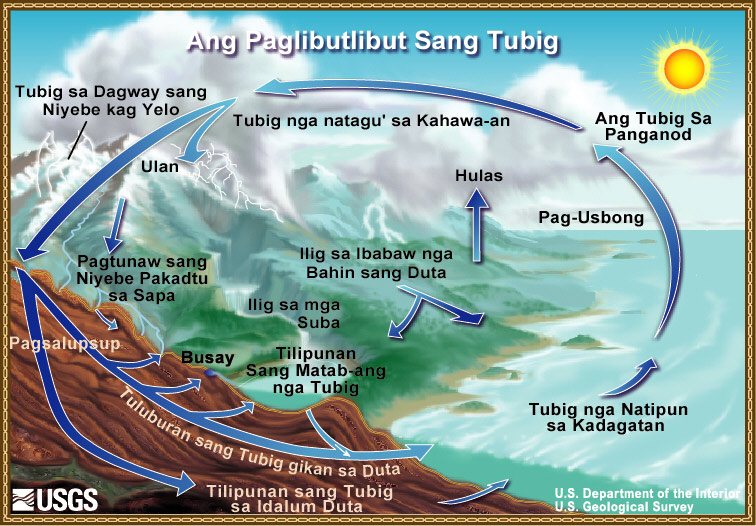
A water cycle diagram in Hiligaynon

Aside from Hiligaynon, the language is also referred to as Ilonggo, also spelled Ilongo, as it originated in Iloilo. Many speakers outside Iloilo argue, that this is an incorrect usage of the word Ilonggo. In precise usage, these people opine that Ilonggo should be used only in relation to the ethnolinguistic group of native inhabitants of Iloilo and the culture associated with native Hiligaynon speakers in that place, including their language. The disagreement over the usage of Ilonggo to refer to the language extends to Philippine language specialists and native laypeople.

== History ==
Historical evidence from observations of early Spanish explorers in the Archipelago shows that the nomenclature used to refer to this language had its origin among the people of the coasts or people of the Ilawod ("los [naturales] de la playa") in Iloilo, Panay, whom Spanish explorer Miguel de Loarca called Yligueynes (or the more popular term Hiligaynon, also referred to by the Karay-a people as Siná).

The term Hiligaynon comes from the root word ilig ('to go downstream'), referring to a flowing river in Iloilo. In contrast, the Kinaray-a has been used by what the Spanish colonizers called Arayas, which may be a Spanish misconception of the Hiligaynon words Iraya or taga-Iraya, or the current and more popular version Karay-a ('highlanders' – people of Iraya/highlands).

== Dialects ==
Similar to many languages in the Philippines, very little research on dialectology has been done on Hiligaynon. Standard Hiligaynon is the dialect that is used in the province of Iloilo, primarily in the northern and eastern portions of the province. It has a more traditional and extensive vocabulary, whereas the Urban Hiligaynon dialect spoken in Metro Iloilo has a more simplified or modern vocabulary.

For example, the term for 'to wander', 'to walk', or 'to stroll' in Urban Hiligaynon is lágaw, which is also widely used by most of the Hiligaynon speakers. In contrast, Standard Hiligaynon more commonly uses dayán, a term that is rarely or never used by other dialects of the language anymore. Another example, amó iní, ('this is it') in Standard Hiligaynon can be simplified in Urban Hiligaynon and become 'mó'ní.

Some of the other widely recognized dialects of the language, aside from Standard Hiligaynon and Urban Hiligaynon, are Bacolodnon Hiligaynon (Metro Bacolod dialect), Negrense Hiligaynon (provincial Negros Occidental dialect that is composed of three sub-variants: Northern, Central and Southern Negrense Hiligaynon), Guimaras Hiligaynon, and Mindanao Hiligaynon (which incorporated some Cebuano and other languages due to the mass influx of migrants from Cebu, Bohol, Siquijor and Cebuano-speaking parts of Mindanao reside in the Soccsksargen area).

Some native speakers also consider Kinaray-a (also known as Hiniraya or Antiqueño) and Capiznon dialects of Hiligaynon. However, linguists have classified Kinaray-a as a Western Bisayan language, while Capiznon is a Central Bisayan language closely related to Hiligaynon.

== Phonology ==
=== Consonants ===
Main consonant phonemes
| | Labial | | Dental/ Alveolar | | Palatal | Velar | | Glottal |
|---|---|---|---|---|---|---|---|---|
| Nasal | m | | n | | | ŋ | | |
| Stop | p | b | t | d | | k | ɡ | ʔ |
| Fricative | | | s | | | | | h |
| Flap | | | ɾ | | | | | |
| Approximant | w | | l | | j | | | |

Consonants [d] and [ɾ] were once allophones but cannot interchange as in other Philippine languages: patawaron ('to forgive') [from patawad, 'forgiveness'] but not patawadon, and tagadiín ('from where') [from diín, 'where'] but not tagariín.

=== Vowels ===
There are four main vowels: /a/, /i ~ ɛ/, /o ~ ʊ/, and /u/. [i] and [ɛ] (both spelled i) are allophones, with [i] in the beginning and middle and sometimes final syllables and [ɛ] in final syllables. The vowels [ʊ] and [o] are also allophones, with [ʊ] always being used when it is the beginning of a syllable, and [o] always used when it ends a syllable.

== Writing system ==
Hiligaynon is written using the Latin script. Until the second half of the 20th century, Hiligaynon was widely written largely following Spanish orthographic conventions. Nowadays there exists an officially recognized standard orthography for the language, which was standardized in 2022 and is based on the current orthographic rules of Filipino.

A noticeable feature of the formerly used Spanish-influenced orthography absent in those writing following Filipino's orthography is the use of "c" and "qu" in representing /k/ (now replaced with "k" in all instances) and the absence of the letter "w" ("u" was formerly used in certain instances).

The core alphabet consists of 20 letters used for expressing consonants and vowels in Hiligaynon, each of which comes in an uppercase and lowercase variety.

=== Alphabet ===
The 1st to 10th letters
| Symbol | A a | | | B b | D d | E e | G g | H h | I i | | K k | L l | M m |
| Abakada name | a | | | ba | da | e | ga | ha | i | | ka | la | ma |
| Modern name | ey | | | bi | di | i | dyi | eyts | ay | | key | el | em |
| Pronunciation | [a/ə] | [aw] | [aj] | [b] | [d] | [ɛ/e] | [ɡ] | [h] | [ɪ/i] | [ɪo] | [k] | [l] | [m] |
| in context | a | aw/ao | ay | b | d | e | g | h | i | iw/io | k | l | m |

The 11th to 20th letters
| Symbol | N n | Ng ng | O o | | P p | R r | S s | | T t | U u | | W w | Y y |
| Abakada name | na | nga | o | | pa | ra | sa | | ta | u | | wa | ya |
| Modern name | en | endyi | o | | pi | ar | es | | ti | yu | | dobolyu | way |
| Pronunciation | [n] | [ŋ] | [ɔ/o] | [oj] | [p] | [r] | [s] | [ʃʲ] | [t] | [ʊ/u] | [w] | [w] | [j] |
| in context | n | ng | o | oy | p | r | s | sy | t | u | ua | w | y |

Formerly, the letter K was sorted between B and D, as in the Abakada alphabet.

Additional letters for foreign words are shown in the official orthography in a separate table:

The foreign letters
| Symbol | C c | F f | J j | Ñ ñ | Q q | V v | X x | Z z |
| Name | si | ef | dyey | enye | kyu | vi | eks | zi |

=== Additional symbols ===
The apostrophe ⟨'⟩ and hyphen ⟨-⟩ also appear in Hiligaynon writing, and might be considered separate letters.

The hyphen, in particular, is used medially to indicate the glottal stop san-o 'when' gab-e 'evening; night'. It is also used in reduplicated words: adlaw-adlaw 'daily, every day', from adlaw 'day, sun'. This marking is not used in reduplicated words whose base is not also used independently, as in pispis 'bird'.

Hyphens are also used in words with successive sounds of /g/ and /ŋ/, to separate the letters with the digraph NG. Like in the word gin-gaan 'was given'; without the hyphen, it would be read as gingaan /gi.ŋaʔan/ as opposed to /gin.gaʔan/.

The diacritical marks are also sometimes used, in the same way as in the Filipino orthography.

== Grammar ==
=== Determiners ===
Hiligaynon has three types of case markers: absolutive, ergative, and oblique. These types in turn are divided into personal, that have to do with names of people, and impersonal, that deal with everything else, and further into singular and plural types, though the plural impersonal case markers are just the singular impersonal case markers + mga (a contracted spelling for /maŋa/), a particle used to denote plurality in Hiligaynon.

| | Absolutive | Ergative | Oblique |
|---|---|---|---|
| singular impersonal | ang | sang, sing* | sa |
| plural impersonal | ang mga | sang mga, sing mga* | sa mga |
| singular personal | si | ni | kay |
| plural personal** | sanday | nanday | kanday |

(*)The articles sing and sing mga means the following noun is indefinite, while sang tells of a definite noun, like the use of a in English as opposed to the; however, it is not as common in modern speech, being replaced by sang. It appears in conservative translations of the Bible into Hiligaynon and in traditional or formal speech.
(**)The plural personal case markers are not used very often and not even by all speakers. Again, this is an example of a case marker that has fallen largely into disuse, but is still occasionally used when speaking a more traditional form of Hiligaynon, using fewer Spanish loan words.

The case markers do not determine which noun is the subject and which is the object; rather, the affix of the verb determines this, though the ang-marked noun is always the topic.

Example
| Ang lalaki nagkaon sang tinapay. | ≈ | Ang tinapay ginkaon sang lalaki. |
| 'The man ate the bread' | ≈ | 'The bread was eaten by the man' (literal) |

=== Personal pronouns ===
| | Absolutive | Ergative₁ (Postposed) | Ergative₂ (Preposed) | Oblique |
|---|---|---|---|---|
| 1st person singular | ako, ko | nakon, ko | akon | sa akon |
| 2nd person singular | ikaw, ka | nimo, mo | imo | sa imo |
| 3rd person singular | siya | niya | iya | sa iya |
| 1st person plural inclusive | kita | naton, ta | aton | sa aton |
| 1st person plural exclusive | kami | namon | amon | sa amon |
| 2nd person plural | kamo | ninyo | inyo | sa inyo |
| 3rd person plural | sila | nila | ila | sa ila |

=== Demonstrative pronouns ===
| | Absolutive | Ergative/Oblique | Locative | Existential |
|---|---|---|---|---|
| Nearest to speaker ('this, here') | iní | siní | dirí | (y)ári |
| Near to addressee or closely removed from speaker and addressee ('that, there') | inâ | sinâ | dirâ | (y)arà |
| Remote ('yon, yonder') | ató | sadtó | didtó | (y)á(d)to |

In addition to this, there are two verbal deictics, karí, meaning 'to come to the speaker', and kadto, meaning 'to go yonder'.

=== Copula ===
Hiligaynon lacks the marker of sentence inversion ay of Tagalog/Filipino or hay of Akeanon. Instead sentences in SV form (Filipino: Di karaniwang anyo) are written without any marker or copula.

Examples:

Si Leni ay maganda (Tagalog)

Si Leni matahum / Gwapa si Leni (Hiligaynon) = 'Leni is beautiful.'

'Leni is beautiful' (English)

There is no direct translation for the English copula to be in Hiligaynon. However, the prefixes mangin- and nangin- may be used to mean will be and became, respectively.

Example: Manamì mangín manggaránon.
'It is nice to become rich.'

The Spanish copula estar ('to be') has also become a part of the Hiligaynon lexicon. Its meaning and pronunciation have changed compared to its Spanish meaning, however. In Hiligaynon it is pronounced as istar and means 'to live (in)/location' (Compare with the Hiligaynon word puyô).

Example: Nagaistar ako sa tabuk suba.
'I live in tabuk suba'. Tabuk suba translates to 'other side of the river' and is also a barangay in Jaro, Iloilo.

=== Existential ===
To indicate the existence of an object, the word may is used.

Example:

May idô (a)ko
EXIST dog 1SG
I have a dog.

=== Hiligaynon linkers ===
When an adjective modifies a noun, the linker nga links the two.

Example:

Ido nga itom
'black dog'

Sometimes, if the linker is preceded by a word that ends in a vowel, glottal stop or the letter N, it becomes acceptable to contract it into -ng, as in Filipino. This is often used to make the words sound more poetic or to reduce the number of syllables. Sometimes the meaning may change as in maayo nga aga, '(the) good morning', and maayong aga, the greeting for 'good morning'.

The linker ka is used if a number modifies a noun.

Example:

Anum ka ido
'six dogs'

=== Interrogative pronouns ===
The interrogative pronouns of Hiligaynon are as follows: diin, san-o, sin-o, nga-a, kamusta, ano, and pila

Diin means 'where'.
Example: Diin ka na subong?
'Where are you now?'

A derivation of diin, tagadiin, is used to inquire about the birthplace or hometown of the listener.
Example: Tagadiin ka?
'Where are you from?'

San-o means 'when'
Example: San-o inâ?
'When is that?'

Sin-o means 'who'
Example: Sin-o imo abyan?
'Who is your friend?'

Nga-a means 'why'
Example: Nga-a indi ka magkadto?
'Why won't you go?'

Kamusta means 'how', as in "How are you?"
Example: Kamusta ang tindahan?
'How is the store?'

Ano means 'what'
Example: Ano ang imo ginabasa?
'What are you reading?'

A derivative of ano, paano, meaning 'how', as in "How do I do that?"
Example: Paano ko makapulî?
'How can I get home?'

A derivative of paano is paanoano, an archaic phrase which can be compared with kamusta.
Example: Paanoano ikaw?
'How art thou?'

Pila means 'how much/how many'
Example: Pila ang gaupod sa imo?
'How many are with you?'

A derivative of pila, ikapila, asks the numerical order of the person, as in, "What place were you born in your family?"(first-born, second-born, etc.) This word is notoriously difficult to translate into English, as English has no equivalent.
Example: Ikapila ka sa inyo pamilya?
'What place were you born into your family?'

A derivative of pila, tagpila, asks the monetary value of something, as in, "How much is this beef?"
Example: Tagpila ini nga karne sang baka?
'How much is this beef?'

=== Verbs ===
==== Focus ====
As it is essential for sentence structure and meaning, focus is a key concept in Hiligaynon and other Philippine languages. In English, in order to emphasize a part of a sentence, variation in intonation is usually employed – the voice is stronger or louder on the part emphasized. For example:

1. The man is stealing rice from the market for his sister.
2. The man is stealing rice from the market for his sister.
3. The man is stealing rice from the market for his sister.
4. The man is stealing rice from the market for his sister.

Furthermore, active and passive grammatical constructions can be used in English to place focus on the actor or object as the subject:

The man stole the rice. vs. The rice was stolen by the man.

In contrast, sentence focus in Philippine languages is built into the construction by grammatical elements. Focus is marked by verbal affixes and a special particle prior to the noun in focus. Consider the following Hiligaynon translations of the above sentences:

1. Nagakawat ang lalaki sang bugas sa tinda para sa iya utod.
2. Ginakawat sang lalaki ang bugas sa tinda para sa iya utod.
3. Ginakawatan sang lalaki sang bugas ang tinda para sa iya utod.
4. Ginakawatan sang lalaki sang bugas sa tinda para sa iya utod.

(lalaki 'man'; kawat 'to steal'; bugas 'rice'; tinda 'market'; utod 'sibling'; kamot 'hand')

==== Summary table ====
Trigger, Mode and Aspect Affixes for Hiligaynon
| TRIGGER | | ASPECT | MODE | | | | | | |
| TRIGGER | | ASPECT | Neutral | Purposive | Durative | Causative | Distributive | Cooperative | Dubitative |
|---|---|---|---|---|---|---|---|---|---|
| Agent | Goal | Unreal | -on | pag—on | paga—on | pa—on | pang—on | pakig—on | iga—on |
| Agent | Goal | Real | gin- | gin- | gina- | ginpa- | ginpang- | ginpakig- | ø |
| Agent | Referent | Unreal | -an | pag—an | paga—an | pa—an | pang—an | pakig—an | iga—an |
| Agent | Referent | Real | gin—an | gin—an | gina—an | ginpa—an | ginpang—an | ginpakig—an | ø |
| Agent | Accessory | Unreal | i- | ipag- | ipaga- | ipa- | ipang- | ipakig- | iga- |
| Agent | Accessory | Real | gin- | gin- | gina- | ginpa- | ginpang- | ginpakig- | ø |
| Agent | Actor | Unreal | -um- | mag- | maga- | ø | mang- | makig- | ø |
| Agent | Actor | Real | -um- | nag- | naga- | ø | nang- | nakig- | ø |
| Patient | Actor | Unreal | maka- | makapag- | makapaga- | makapa- | makapang- | mapapakig- | ø |
| Patient | Actor | Real | naka- | nakapag- | nakapaga- | nakapa- | nakapang- | napapakig- | ø |
| Patient | Goal | Unreal | ma- | mapag- | mapaga- | mapa- | mapang- | mapakig- | ø |
| Patient | Goal | Real | na- | napag- | napaga- | napa- | napang- | napakig- | ø |

=== Reduplication ===
Hiligaynon, like other Philippine languages, employs reduplication, the repetition of a root or stem of a word or part of a word for grammatical or semantic purposes. Reduplication in Hiligaynon tends to be limited to roots instead of affixes, as the only inflectional or derivational morpheme that seems to reduplicate is -pa-. Root reduplication suggests 'non-perfectiveness' or 'non-telicity'. Used with nouns, reduplication of roots indicate particulars which are not fully actualized members of their class. Note the following examples.

balay-bálay
house-house
toy-house, playhouse

maestra-maestra
teacher-teacher
make-believe teacher

Reduplication of verbal roots suggests a process lacking a focus or decisive goal. The following examples describe events which have no apparent end, in the sense of lacking purpose or completion. A lack of seriousness may also be implied. Similarly, reduplication can suggest a background process in the midst of a foreground activity, as shown in (5).

Nag-a- hìbî-híbî ang bátâ.
NAG-IMP- cry-cry FOC child
The child has been crying and crying.

Nag-a- tinlò-tinlò akó sang lamésa
NAG-IMP- clean-clean 1SG.FOC UNFOC table
I'm just cleaning off the table (casually).

Nag-a- kàon-káon lang silá sang nag-abót ang íla bisíta.
NAG-IMP- eat-eat just 3PL.FOC UNFOC NAG-arrive FOC 3PL.UNFOC visitor
They were just eating when their visitor arrived.

When used with adjectival roots, non-telicity may suggest a gradualness of the quality, such as the comparison in (6). In comparative constructions the final syllables of each occurrence of the reduplicated root are accented. If the stress of the second occurrence is shifted to the first syllable, then the reduplicated root suggests a superlative degree, as in (7). Superlatives can also be created through prefixation of pinaka- to the root, as in pinaka-dakô.

While non-telicity can suggest augmentation, as shown in (7), it can also indicate diminishment as in shown in (9), in contrast with (8) (note the stress contrast). In (8b), maàyoáyo, accented in the superlative pattern, suggests a trajectory of improvement that has not been fully achieved. In (9b), maàyoayó suggests a trajectory of decline when accented in the comparative pattern. The reduplicated áyo implies sub-optimal situations in both cases; full goodness/wellness is not achieved.

Iní nga kwárto ma-dulùm-dulúm sang sa sinâ
this.FOC LINK room MA-dark-dark UNFOC OBL that.UNFOC
This room is darker than that one.

dakô-dakô
big-big
bigger

dakô-dákô (gid)
big-big (really)
biggest

Ma-áyo ang reló.
MA-good FOC watch
The watch is good/functional.

Ma-àyo-áyo na ang reló.
MA-good-good now FOC watch
The watch is semi-fixed.

Ma-áyo akó.
MA-good 1SG.FOC
I'm well.

Ma-àyo-ayó na akó.
MA-good-good now 1SG.FOC
I'm so so.

== Vocabulary ==
=== Derived from Spanish ===
Hiligaynon has a large number of words derived from Spanish including nouns (e.g., santo from santo, 'saint'), adjectives (e.g., berde from verde, 'green'), prepositions (e.g., antes from antes, 'before'), and conjunctions (e.g., pero from pero, 'but').

Nouns denoting material items and abstract concepts invented or introduced during the early modern era include barko (barco, 'ship'), sapatos (zapatos, 'shoes'), kutsilyo (cuchillo, 'knife'), kutsara (cuchara, 'spoon'), tenedor ('fork'), plato ('plate'), kamiseta (camiseta, 'shirt'), and kambiyo (cambio, 'change', as in money). Spanish verbs are incorporated into Hiligaynon in their infinitive forms: edukar, kantar, mandar, pasar. The same holds true for other languages such as Cebuano. In contrast, incorporations of Spanish verbs into Tagalog for the most part resemble, though are not necessarily derived from, the vos forms in the imperative: eduká, kantá, mandá, pasá. Notable exceptions include andar, pasyal (from pasear) and sugal (from jugar).

== Examples ==
=== Numbers ===
Just like other Philippine languages that are influenced by Spanish, Hiligaynon uses 2 systems of numbers, one from its Austronesian roots and one derived from Spanish.

| Number | Hiligaynon-Native | Hiligaynon-Spanish |
|---|---|---|
| 1 | isá | uno |
| 2 | duhá | dos |
| 3 | tátlo | tres |
| 4 | ápat | kuwatro |
| 5 | limá | singku |
| 6 | ánum | sais |
| 7 | pitó | syete |
| 8 | waló | otso |
| 9 | siyám | nwebe/nuybi |
| 10 | pulò/napulò | dyis |
| 100 | gatós | siyen/syento |
| 1,000 | líbo | mil |
| 10,000 | laksâ/isáng libo | dyis mil |
| 1,000,000 | hámbad/ramák | milyon |
| First | tig-una/panguná | primera |
| Second | ikaduhá | segunda |
| Third | ikatlo/ikatátlo | tersera |
| Fourth | ikap-at/ikaápat | |
| Fifth | ikalimá | |
| Sixth | ikán-um/ikaánum | |
| Seventh | ikapitó | |
| Eighth | ikawaló | |
| Ninth | ikasiyám | |
| Tenth | ikapulò | |

filipino

=== Days of the week ===
The names of the days of the week are derived from their Spanish equivalents.

| Day | Native Names | Meaning | Castilian Derived |
|---|---|---|---|
| Sunday | Tigburukad | root word: bukad, 'open'; 'Starting Day' | Domingo |
| Monday | Dumasaon | root word: dason 'next'; 'Next Day' | Lunes |
| Tuesday | Dukot-dukot | literal meaning 'Busy Day'; 'Busiest Day' | Martes |
| Wednesday | Baylo-baylo | root word: baylo, 'exchange'; 'Barter' or 'Market Day' | Miyerkoles |
| Thursday | Danghos | literal meaning: 'rush'; 'Rushing of the Work Day' | Huwebes |
| Friday | Hingot-hingot | literal meaning: 'Completing of the Work Day' | Biyernes |
| Saturday | Ligid-ligid | root word: ligid, 'lay-down to rest'; 'Rest Day' | Sábado |

=== Months of the year ===
| Month | Native Name | Castilian Derived |
|---|---|---|
| January | Ulalong | Enero |
| February | Dagang Kahoy | Pebrero |
| March | Dagang Bulan | Marso |
| April | Kiling | Abril |
| May | Himabuyan | Mayo |
| June | Kabay | Hunyo |
| July | Hidapdapan | Hulyo |
| August | Lubad-lubad | Agosto |
| September | Kangurulsol | Setiyembre |
| October | Bagyo-bagyo | Oktubre |
| November | Panglot Diyutay | Nobiyembre |
| December | Panglot Dako | Disiyembre |

=== Quick phrases ===
| English | Hiligaynon |
|---|---|
| Yes. | Húo. |
| No. | Indî. |
| Thank you. | Salamat. |
| Thank you very much! | Salamat gid. / Madamò gid nga salamat! |
| I'm sorry. | Patawaron mo ako. / Pasayloha 'ko. / Pasensyahon mo ako. / Pasensya na. |
| Help me! | Buligi (a)ko! / Tabangi (a)ko! |
| Delicious! | Namit! |
| Take care (Also used to signify goodbye) | Halong. |
| Are you angry/scared? | Akig/hadlok ka? |
| Do you feel happy/sad? | Nalipay/Nasubo-an ka? |
| I don't know/I didn't know | Ambot / Wala ko kabalo / Wala ko nabal-an |
| I don't care | Wa-ay ko labot! |
| That's wonderful/marvelous! | Námì-námì ba! / Nami ah! |
| I like this/that! | Nanámìan ko sini/sina! |
| I love you. | Palangga ta ka. / Ginahigugma ko ikaw. |

=== Greetings ===
| English | Hiligaynon |
|---|---|
| Hello! | Kumusta/Maayong adlaw (lit. 'good day') |
| Good morning. | Maayong aga. |
| Good noon. | Maayong ugto/Maayong udto |
| Good afternoon. | Maayong hapon. |
| Good evening. | Maayong gab-i. |
| How are you? | Kamusta ka?/Kamusta ikaw?/Musta na? (informal) |
| I'm fine. | Maayo man. |
| I am fine, how about you? | Maayo man, ikaw ya? |
| How old are you? | Pila na ang edad (ni)mo? / Ano ang edad mo? / Pila ka tuig ka na? |
| I am 24 years old. | Beinte kwatro anyos na (a)ko./ Duha ka pulo kag apat ka tuig na (a)ko. |
| My name is... | Ang ngalan ko... |
| I am Erman. | Ako si Erman. / Si Erman ako. |
| What is your name? | Ano imo ngalan? / Ano ngalan (ni)mo? |
| Until next time. | Asta sa liwat. |

=== This/that/what ===
| English | Hiligaynon |
|---|---|
| What is this/that? | Ano (i)ni/(i)nâ? |
| This is a sheet of paper. | Isa ni ka panid sang papel. / Isa ka panid ka papel ini. |
| That is a book. | Libro (i)nâ. |
| What will you do?/What are you going to do? | Ano ang himu-on (ni)mo? / Ano ang buhaton (ni)mo? / Maano ka? |
| What are you doing? | Ano ang ginahimo (ni)mo? / Gaano ka? |
| My female friend | Ang akon babaye nga abyan/miga |
| My male friend | Ang akon lalake nga abyan/migo |
| My girlfriend/boyfriend | Ang akon nubya/nubyo |

=== Space and time ===
| English | Hiligaynon |
|---|---|
| Where are you now? | Diin ka (na) subong? |
| Where shall we go? | Diin (ki)ta makadto? |
| Where are we going? | Diin (ki)ta pakadto? |
| Where are you going? | (Sa) diin ka makadto? |
| We shall go to Iloilo. | Makadto (ki)ta sa Iloilo. |
| We're going to Bacolod. | Makadto kami sa Bacolod. |
| I am going home. | Mapa-uli na ko (sa balay). / (Ma)puli na ko. |
| Where do you live? | Diin ka naga-istar? / Diin ka naga-puyô? |
| Where did you come from? (Where have you just been?) | Diin ka (nag)-halin? |
| Have you been here long? | Dugay ka na di(ri)? |
| (To the) left. | (Sa) wala. |
| (To the) right. | (Sa) tuo. |
| What time is it? | Ano('ng) takna na? / Ano('ng) oras na? |
| It's ten o'clock. | Alas diyes na. |
| What time is it now? | Ano ang oras subong? / Ano oras na? |

=== Ancient times of the day ===
| Time | Name | Meaning |
|---|---|---|
| 06:00 AM | Butlak Adlaw | Daybreak |
| 10:00 AM | Tig-ilitlog or Tig-iritlog | Time for chickens to lay eggs |
| 12:00 noon | Udto Adlaw or Ugto Adlaw | Noon time or midday |
| 02:00 PM | Huyog Adlaw | Early afternoon |
| 04:00 PM | Tigbarahog | Time for feeding the swine |
| 06:00 PM | Sirom | Twilight |
| 08:00 PM | Tingpanyapon or Tig-inyapon | Supper time |
| 10:00 PM | Tigbaranig | Time to lay the banig or sleeping mat |
| 11:00 PM | Unang Pamalò | First cockerel's crow |
| 12:00 midnight | Tungang Gab-i | Midnight |
| 02:00 AM | Ikaduhang Pamalò | Second cockerel's crow |
| 04:00 AM | Ikatatlong Pamalò | Third cockerel's crow |
| 05:00 AM | Tigbulugtaw or Tigburugtaw | Waking up time |

=== When buying ===
| English | Hiligaynon |
|---|---|
| May/Can I buy? | Pwede ko ma(g)-bakal? |
| How much is this/that? | Tag-pilá iní/inâ? |
| I'll buy the... | Baklon ko ang... |
| Is this expensive? | Mahal bala (i)ni? |
| Is that cheap? | Barato bala (i)na? |

=== The Lord's Prayer ===
Amay namon, nga yara ka sa mga langit
Pagdayawon ang imo ngalan
Umabot sa amon ang imo ginharian
Matuman ang imo boot
Diri sa duta siling sang sa langit
Hatagan mo kami niyan sing kan-on namon
Sa matag-adlaw
Kag patawaron mo kami sa mga sala namon
Siling nga ginapatawad namon ang nakasala sa amon
Kag dili mo kami ipagpadaog sa mga panulay
Hinunuo luwason mo kami sa kalaot
Amen.

=== The Ten Commandments ===
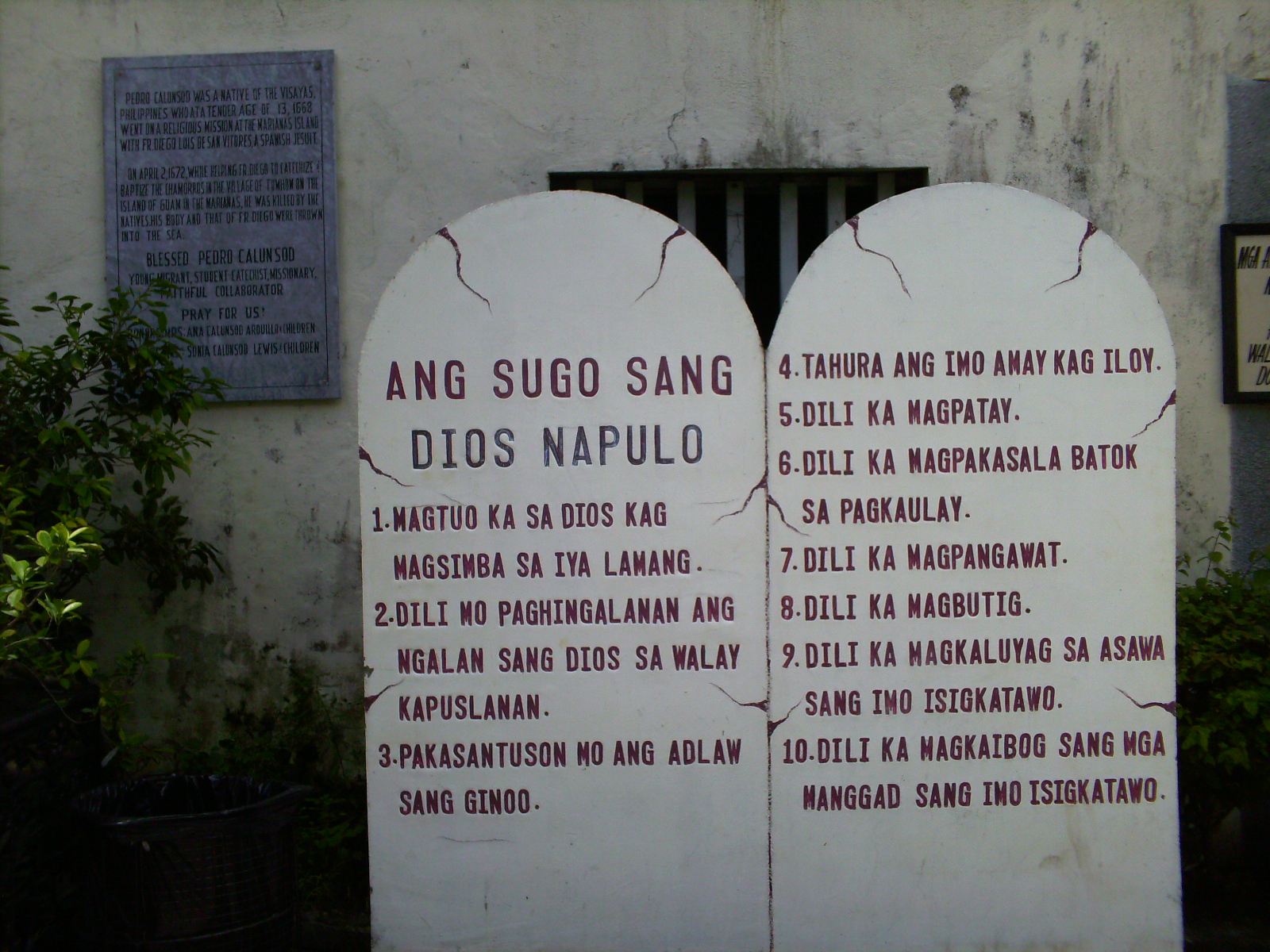
The Catholic version of the Ten Commandments in Hiligaynon at Molo Church, Molo, Iloilo City

Literal translation as per photo:

1. Believe in God and worship only him
2. Do not use the name of God without purpose
3. Honor the day of the Lord
4. Honor your father and mother
5. Do not kill
6. Do not pretend to be married against virginity (don't commit adultery)
7. Do not steal
8. Do not lie
9. Do not have desire for the wife of your fellow man
10. Do not covet the riches of your fellow man

=== Universal Declaration of Human Rights ===
Article 1 of the Universal Declaration of Human Rights (Ang Kalibutánon nga Pahayag sang mga Kinamaatárung sang Katáwhan)

Ang tanán nga táwo ginbún-ag nga hílway kag may pag-alalangay sa dungóg kag kinamatárong.
Silá ginhatágan sing pagpamat-ud kag balatyágon kag nagakadápat nga magbinuligáy sa kahulugan sang pag-inuturáy.

Translation:

Every person is born free and equal with honor and rights.
They are given reason and conscience and they must always trust each other for the spirit of brotherhood.

== Notable Hiligaynon writers ==
- Peter Solis Nery (born 1969) – prolific writer, poet, playwright, novelist, editor, "Hari sang Binalaybay", and champion of the Hiligaynon language. Born in Dumangas.
- Antonio Ledesma Jayme (1854–1937) – lawyer, revolutionary, provincial governor and assemblyman. Born in Jaro, lived in Bacolod.
- Graciano López Jaena (1856–1896) – journalist, orator, and revolutionary from Iloilo, well known for his written works, La Solidaridad and Fray Botod. Born in Jaro.
- Flavio Zaragoza y Cano (1892–1994) – lawyer, journalist and the "Prince of Visayan poets". Born in Janipaan, Cabatuan.
- Conrado Saquian Norada (born 1921) – lawyer, intelligence officer and governor of Iloilo from 1969 to 1986. Co-founder and editor of Yuhum magazine. Born in Miag-ao.
- Ramon Muzones (1913–1992) – prolific writer and lawyer, recipient of the National Artist of the Philippines for Literature award. Born in Miag-ao.
- Magdalena Jalandoni (1891–1978) – prolific writer, novelist and feminist. Born in Jaro.
- Angel Magahum Sr. (1876–1931) – writer, editor and composer. Composed the classic Iloilo ang Banwa Ko, the unofficial song of Iloilo. Born in Molo.
- Valente Cristobal (1875–1945) – noted Hiligaynon playwright. Born in Polo (now Valenzuela City), Bulacan.
- Elizabeth Batiduan Navarro – Hiligaynon drama writer for radio programs of Bombo Radyo Philippines.
- Genevieve L. Asenjo – Filipino poet, novelist, translator and literary scholar in Kinaray-a, Hiligaynon and Filipino. Her first novel, Lumbay ng Dila, (C&E/DLSU, 2010) received a citation for the Juan C. Laya Prize for Excellence in Fiction in a Philippine Language in the National Book Award.

== See also ==
- Cebuano language
- Hiligaynon people
- Languages of the Philippines
- Kinaray-a language
- Capiznon language
