= Filipino language =

National language of the Philippines

Filipino
- Wikang Filipino ᜏᜒᜃᜅ᜔ ᜉᜒᜎᜒᜉᜒᜈᜓ
- Pronunciation: [filiˈpino]
- Native to: Philippines
- Region: All regions of the Philippines, especially in Metro Manila, and in other urban centers in the archipelago
- Language family: Austronesian: Malayo-Polynesian; Philippine; Greater Central Philippine; Central Philippine; Kasiguranin–Tagalog; Tagalog; Filipino
- Early forms: Proto-Austronesian: Proto-Malayo-Polynesian; Proto-Greater Central Philippine; Proto-Central Philippine; Proto-Philippine; Old Tagalog; Tagalog
- Writing system: Latin (Filipino alphabet, historically Abakada alphabet); Philippine Braille; Baybayin (cultural; revitalizing)

Official status
- Official language in: Philippines
- Regulated by: Komisyon sa Wikang Filipino

Language codes
- ISO 639-2: fil
- ISO 639-3: fil
- Glottolog: fili1244
- Linguasphere: 31-CKA-aa

Filipino (English: /ˌfɪlɪˈpiːnoʊ/ FIL-ih-PEE-noh; [filiˈpino]; Baybayin: ᜉᜒᜎᜒᜉᜒᜈᜓ) is the national language, the main lingua franca, and one of the two official languages of the Philippines alongside English. It is a de facto standardized form of the Tagalog language, as spoken and written in Metro Manila and in other urban centers of the archipelago. The 1987 Constitution mandates that Filipino be further enriched and developed by the other languages of the Philippines.

== Background ==
The Philippines is a multilingual country with 175 living languages. These languages are spoken by different ethnic and linguistic groups.

Spanish involvement in the Philippines began in 1565 with the establishment of a Spanish settlement in Cebu. Spain later established Manila as the capital of its colony in 1571. Manila was located in a predominantly Tagalog-speaking area. Before the Spanish conquest, the area was governed by several political entities, including the Muslim polities associated with Raja Matanda and Raja Sulayman, and Tondo, led by Lakandula.

After the Spanish conquest of Manila, the city became the capital of the Spanish colony in Asia. Manila was selected because of its commercial importance, influence, and strategic location. Spain also sought to protect the city from possible attacks by Portugal and the Netherlands.

During the Spanish period, Spanish was used in government and administration. Spanish coexisted with the many languages spoken throughout the archipelago. Before Spanish rule, the islands were not governed as a single political entity; instead, they consisted of various kingdoms, sultanates, and other communities, each with its own languages and customs.

In 1897, Tagalog was designated as the official language of the revolutionary government under the Constitution of Biak-na-Bato.

During the American colonial period, English became an additional official language alongside Spanish. The number of Spanish speakers gradually declined.

The United States introduced policies that gradually reduced the use of Spanish in official contexts. Spanish was not completely banned; however, English became the principal language of education, government, and law with Spanish no longer having an official status.

In April 12, 1909, the Akademya ng Wikang Pilipino (Academy of the Filipino Language) was founded. One of the group's goals was to enrich the Tagalog language by incorporating words from other Philippine languages to make a common and inclusive Filipino language. even though a member of the Philippine Assembly, León María Guerrero had quashed a 1908 bill that had proposed the founding of a similar institute because he felt it would be better to unite Filipinos under a foreign language such as English or Spanish.

The crowning achievement of the Academy was a highly progressive dictionary compiled by its founder and secretary, Eusebio T. Dáluz. Dáluz started the compilation in 1910 and officially published it five years later, in March 7, 1915, as the Filipino-English Vocabulary. Dáluz also expressed his views on the Filipino language in his column Ang Democracia.

== Designation as the national language ==
While Spanish and English were considered official languages during the American colonial period, there existed no national language initially. Article XIII, section 3 of the 1935 constitution establishing the Commonwealth of the Philippines provided that:

The National Assembly shall take steps toward the development and adoption of a common national language based on one of the existing native languages. Until otherwise provided by law, English and Spanish shall continue as official languages.

On November 13, 1936, the first National Assembly of the Philippine Commonwealth approved Commonwealth Act No. 184; creating the Institute of National Language (later the Surián ng Wikang Pambansâ or SWP) and tasking it with making a study and survey of each existing native language, hoping to choose which was to be the base for a standardized national language. Later, President Manuel L. Quezon appointed representatives for each major regional language to form the NLI. Led by Jaime C. De Veyra, who sat as the chair of the Institute and as the representative of Samar-Leyte-Visayans, the Institute's members were composed of Santiago A. Fonacier (representing the Ilokano-speaking regions), Filemon Sotto (the Cebu-Visayans), Casimiro Perfecto (the Bikolanos), Felix S. Sales Rodriguez (the Panay-Visayans), Hadji Butu (the languages of Muslim Filipinos), and Cecilio Lopez (the Tagalogs).

The Institute of National Language adopted a resolution on November 9, 1937, recommending Tagalog to be basis of the national language. On December 30, 1937, President Quezon issued Executive Order No. 134, s. 1937, approving the adoption of Tagalog as the language of the Philippines, and proclaimed the national language of the Philippines so based on the Tagalog language. Quezon himself was born and raised in Baler, Aurora, which is a native Tagalog-speaking area. The order stated that it would take effect two years from its promulgation. On December 31 of the same year, Quezon proclaimed Tagalog as the basis of the Wikang Pambansâ (National Language) giving the following factors:

1. Tagalog is widely spoken and is the most understood language in all the Philippine Regions.
2. It is not divided into smaller daughter languages, as Visayan or Bikol are.
3. Its literary tradition is the richest of all Philippine languages, the most developed and extensive (mirroring that of the Tuscan language vis-à-vis Italian). From at least before 1935, more books were written in Tagalog than in any other Philippine language.
4. Tagalog has always been the language of Manila, the political centre of the Philippines in much of its history as a multiethnic country and a considerable economic centre of the Philippine islands since time immemorial.
5. The Katipunan generally used the Tagalog language for its operations, and the Philippine Revolution and the First Philippine Republic operationally used Spanish afterwards, but many of the leaders of the revolution spoke Tagalog, more so among ethnic groups from central to southern Luzon including some adjacent islands. Tagalog also became a choice for some non-Tagalog Filipino revolutionary leaders and nationalists in some of their publications, especially if they were to publish in Manila. The Katipunan extended the meaning of the term Tagalog to all people native to the Philippine islands, including Cebuanos, Ilocanos, Kapampangans, etc., and extended the term Katagalugan to the whole Philippine islands not just native Tagalog-speaking areas, building a Tagalog Republic, the reason being a unified opposition against Spanish hegemony.

On June 7, 1940, the Philippine National Assembly passed Commonwealth Act No. 570 declaring that the Filipino national language would be considered an official language effective July 4, 1946 (coinciding with the country's expected date of independence from the United States). That same year, the Balarílà ng Wikang Pambansâ (English: Grammar of the National Language) of grammarian Lope K. Santos introduced the 20-letter Abakada alphabet which became the standard of the national language. The alphabet was officially adopted by the Institute for the Tagalog-Based National Language.

During World War II, the Japanese occupiers encouraged the use of the national language rather than English in schools. The Tagalog-based national language was, therefore, propagated not only in education but also in mass media and in official communication. The census for 1948 reported that 7,126,913 people or 37.11% of the population spoke the language, representing an increase of 11.7% from the 1939 figure of 4,068,565. Of these seven million people, 47.7% learnt it as a second language.

== Further history ==
In 1959, the language became known as Pilipino in schools nationwide as an effort to disassociate it from the Tagalog ethnic group. The changing of the name did not, however, result in universal acceptance among non-Tagalogs, especially Cebuanos who had previously not accepted the 1937 selection.

The 1960s saw the rise of the purist movement where new words were being coined to replace loanwords. This era of "purism" by the SWP sparked criticisms by a number of persons. Two counter-movements emerged during this period of "purism": one campaigning against Tagalog and the other campaigning for more inclusiveness in the national language. In 1963, Negros Occidental congressman Innocencio V. Ferrer took a case reaching the Supreme Court questioning the constitutionality of the choice of Tagalog as the basis of the national language (a case ruled in favor of the national language in 1970). Accusing the national language as simply being Tagalog and lacking any substantial input from other Philippine languages, Congressman Geruncio Lacuesta eventually led a "Modernizing the Language Approach Movement" (MOLAM). Lacuesta hosted a number of "anti-purist" conferences and promoted a "Manila Lingua Franca" which would be more inclusive of loanwords of both foreign and local languages. Lacuesta managed to get nine congressmen to propose a bill aiming to abolish the SWP with an Akademia ng Wikang Filipino, to replace the balarila with a Gramatica ng Wikang Filipino, to replace the 20-letter Abakada with a 32-letter alphabet, and to prohibit the creation of neologisms and the respelling of loanwords. This movement quietened down following the death of Lacuesta.

The national language issue was revived once more during the 1971 Constitutional Convention. While there was a sizable number of delegates in favor of retaining the Tagalog-based national language, majority of the delegates who were non-Tagalogs were even in favor of scrapping the idea of a "national language" altogether. A compromise was reached and the wording on the 1973 constitution made no mention of dropping the national language Pilipino or made any mention of Tagalog. Instead, the 1973 Constitution, in both its original form and as amended in 1976, designated English and Pilipino as official languages and provided for development and formal adoption of a common national language, termed Filipino, to replace Pilipino. Neither the original nor the amended version specified either Tagalog or Pilipino as the basis for Filipino; Instead, tasking the National Assembly to:

take steps toward the development and formal adoption of a common national language to be known as Filipino.

In 1987, a new constitution designated Filipino as the national language and, along with English, as an official language. That constitution included several provisions related to the Filipino language.

Article XIV, Section 6, omits any mention of Tagalog as the basis for Filipino, and states that:

as Filipino evolves, it shall be further developed and enriched on the basis of existing Philippine and other languages.

And also states in the article:

Subject to provisions of law and as the Congress may deem appropriate, the Government shall take steps to initiate and sustain the use of Filipino as a medium of official communication and as language of instruction in the educational system.

and:

The regional languages are the auxiliary official languages in the regions and shall serve as auxiliary media of instruction therein.

Section 17(d) of Executive Order 117 of January 30, 1987 renamed the Institute of National Language as Institute of Philippine Languages. Republic Act No. 7104, approved on August 14, 1991, created the Komisyon sa Wikang Filipino (Commission on the Filipino Language, or KWF), superseding the Institute of Philippine Languages. The KWF reports directly to the President and was tasked to undertake, coordinate and promote researches for the development, propagation and preservation of Filipino and other Philippine languages. On May 13, 1992, the commission issued Resolution 92-1, specifying that Filipino is the

indigenous written and spoken language of Metro Manila and other urban centers in the Philippines used as the language of communication of ethnic groups.

However, as with the 1973 and 1987 Constitutions, 92-1 went neither so far as to categorically identify, nor so far as to dis-identify this language as Tagalog. Definite, absolute, and unambiguous interpretation of 92–1 is the prerogative of the Supreme Court in the absence of directives from the KWF, otherwise the sole legal arbiter of the Filipino language.

Filipino was presented and registered with the International Organization for Standardization (ISO), by Ateneo de Manila University student Martin Gomez, and was added to the ISO registry of languages on September 21, 2004, with it receiving the ISO 639-2 code fil.

On August 22, 2007, it was reported that three Malolos City regional trial courts in Bulacan decided to use Filipino, instead of English, in order to promote the national language. Twelve stenographers from Branches 6, 80 and 81, as model courts, had undergone training at Marcelo H. del Pilar College of Law of Bulacan State University following a directive from the Supreme Court of the Philippines. De la Rama said it was the dream of Chief Justice Reynato Puno to implement the program in other areas such as Laguna, Cavite, Quezon, Aurora, Nueva Ecija, Batangas, Rizal, and Metro Manila, all of which mentioned are natively Tagalog-speaking.

In 2009, the Department of Education promulgated an order institutionalizing a system of mother-tongue based multilingual education ("MLE"), wherein instruction is conducted primarily in a student's mother tongue (one of the various regional Philippine languages) until at least grade three, with additional languages such as Filipino and English being introduced as separate subjects no earlier than grade two. In secondary school, Filipino and English become the primary languages of instruction, with the learner's first language taking on an auxiliary role. After pilot tests in selected schools, the MLE program was implemented nationwide from School Year (SY) 2012–2013.

== Commemoration ==
Since 1997, a month-long celebration of the national language occurs during August, known in Filipino as Buwan ng Wika (Language Month). Previously, this lasted only a week and was known as Linggo ng Wika (Language Week). The celebration coincides with the month of birth of President Manuel L. Quezon, regarded as the "Ama ng Wikang Pambansa" (Father of the national language).

In 1946, Proclamation No. 35 of March 26 provided for a week-long celebration of the national language. this celebration would last from March 27 until April 2 each year, the last day coinciding with birthday of the Filipino writer Francisco Baltazar, author of the Tagalog epic Florante at Laura.

In 1954, Proclamation No. 12 of March 26 provided that the week of celebration would be from March 29 to April 4 every year. This proclamation was amended the following year by President Ramon Magsaysay by Proclamation No. 186 of September 23, moving the dates of celebration to August 13–19, every year. Now coinciding with the birthday of President Manuel L. Quezon. The reason for the move being given that the original celebration was a period "outside of the school year, thereby precluding the participation of schools in its celebration".

In 1988, President Corazon Aquino signed Proclamation No. 19, reaffirming the celebration every August 13 to 19. In 1997, the celebration was extended from a week to a month by Proclamation 1041 of July 15 signed by President Fidel V. Ramos.

== Comparison of Filipino, Pilipino, and Tagalog ==
Jaime López, former representative for Manila's 2nd congressional district, argued that the current state of the Filipino language is contrary to the intention of Republic Act (RA) No. 7104, which requires that the national language be developed and enriched by the lexicon of the country's other languages.

Keith Brown and Sarah Ogilvie similarly argued that, while the official view shared by the government, the Komisyon sa Wikang Filipino (KWF), and a number of educators is that Filipino and Tagalog are separate languages, in practical terms Filipino may be considered the official name of Tagalog or even a synonym of it. Today's Filipino language is best described as "Tagalog-based". The language is usually called Tagalog within the Philippines and among Filipinos to differentiate it from other Philippine languages, but it has also come to be known as Filipino to differentiate it from the languages of other countries; the former implies a regional origin, the latter national. This is similar to the comparison between Mandarin and Chinese.

Linguistically, Tagalog (as in the Manileño dialect), Pilipino, and Filipino share identical grammar, phonology, and core vocabulary, as Pilipino and Filipino represent sequential, government-designated names for the standardized variety spoken and written in Metro Manila. However, confusion often arises because when people refer to Tagalog, they usually mean Manileño Tagalog specifically. Since Manila is the center of power, its way of speaking became the standard for general Tagalog, Pilipino, and Filipino. In contrast, the broader Tagalog language consists of a continuum of regional dialects, such as those spoken in Batangas, Bulacan, Rizal, Laguna, and Quezon (Tayabas). These varieties exhibit distinct phonological, lexical, and grammatical traits that differ from the capital's standardized dialect taught in schools; for example, certain southern dialects retain a word-internal glottal stop in words such as ngayon ("now") and gabi ("night"), while the Teresian–Morong dialect features sound shifts such as /d/ to /r/ (e.g., bunrok for bundok, "mountain"). Furthermore, continuous aspect verbs in parts of Batangas, Quezon, and Aurora utilize the prefix na- (e.g., nakain) instead of the standard infix -um- with reduplication (kumakain).

Work toward establishing a unified national language began during the Commonwealth period under the 1935 Constitution. Following the selection of Tagalog on November 9, 1937, Executive Order No. 134 (effective December 30, 1937) designated Tagalog as the basis for the national language, leading to the publication of official grammars and dictionaries in 1940 under the unnamed designation Wikang Pambansâ ("National Language"). While it was initially only the national language, Commonwealth Act No. 570 (approved June 7, 1940) declared it an official language alongside English and Spanish upon Philippine independence on July 4, 1946. To distance the standard from its specific regional and ethnic association, Education Secretary José E. Romero issued Department Order No. 7 on August 13, 1959, officially naming the language Pilipino.

Article XV, Section 3 of the 1973 Constitution treated Pilipino and Filipino as two distinct legal entities rather than synonyms—promulgating the constitution in English and Pilipino (dropping Spanish as an official language) while mandating the National Assembly to take steps toward developing a common national language to be known as Filipino. Pilipino remained an official language until the adoption of the 1987 Constitution on February 2, 1987, which formally replaced it with Filipino as both the national and co-official language. To avoid regional resistance, the 1987 Constitution avoided explicitly naming Tagalog as its basis, stating in Article XIV, Section 6 that Filipino would be "developed and enriched based on existing Philippine and other languages." On May 13, 1992, the KWF issued Resolution No. 92-1, clarifying that Filipino is the native spoken and written language in Metro Manila and other urban centers used as a lingua franca among ethnic groups—effectively reaffirming its basis in Manileño Tagalog.

A key distinction between Pilipino and Filipino lies in orthography and historical standardization, as Pilipino reflects pre-1987 conventions and terminology.

Although constitutionally mandated to enrich its vocabulary through additions from other Philippine languages like Cebuano, Ilocano, and Hiligaynon, modern Filipino’s adoption of non-Tagalog indigenous elements has largely been restricted to minor vocabulary, leaving its grammatical core almost entirely Tagalog. Furthermore, many non-Tagalog and foreign loanwords were already integrated into Tagalog prior to its selection as the national language through centuries of trade, colonization, regional migration to Manila.

On May 23, 2007, Ricardo Maria Nolasco, KWF chair and a linguistics expert, acknowledged in a keynote speech during the NAKEM Conference at the Mariano Marcos State University in Batac, Ilocos Norte, that Filipino was simply Tagalog in syntax and grammar, with as yet no grammatical element or lexicon coming from Ilokano, Cebuano, Hiligaynon, or any of the other Philippine languages. He noted that this ran contrary to the mandate of RA No. 7104, which requires the national language to be developed and enriched by the lexicon of the country's other languages. On August 24, 2007, Nolasco elaborated further on the relationship between Tagalog and Filipino:

Are "Tagalog," "Pilipino" and "Filipino" different languages? No, they are mutually intelligible varieties, and therefore belong to one language. According to the KWF, Filipino is that speech variety spoken in Metro Manila and other urban centers where different ethnic groups meet. It is the most prestigious variety of Tagalog and the language used by the national mass media. The other yardstick for distinguishing a language from a dialect is: different grammar, different language. "Filipino", "Pilipino" and "Tagalog" share identical grammar. They have the same determiners (ang, ng and sa); the same personal pronouns (siya, ako, niya, kanila, etc.); the same demonstrative pronouns (ito, iyan, doon, etc.); the same linkers (na, at and ay); the same particles (na and pa); and the same verbal affixes -in, -an, i- and -um-. In short, same grammar, same language.

Rather than evolving organically, this lexical expansion has largely occurred through formal language planning. In a Facebook informational series entitled Salit-salitaan, the KWF demonstrated its efforts to introduce obscure loanwords from other Philippine languages—such as dágaw ("daydreaming" in Cebuano), andáp ("frost" in Kankanaey), fútag ("umbilical cord" in Ibanag), and kábus ("full moon" in Ilocano), often written without diacritics—to provide one-word equivalents for concepts lacking direct Tagalog terms.

In connection with the promotion of the national language, the related term Tagalista is frequently used. While the word literally means a specialist in Tagalog language or culture, in the context of debates surrounding the national language and "Imperial Manila", it is often applied pejoratively to individuals who advocate for the primacy of Tagalog at the expense of other native Philippine languages.

== See also ==
- Philippine literature
- Philippine Braille
- Filipino Sign Language
- Filipino orthography
  - Filipino alphabet
  - Abakada alphabet
  - Suyat
  - Comparison of orthographies of languages of the Philippines
- Tagalog grammar
- Tagalog language
- Tagalog phonology
- Tagalog Wikipedia
- Taglish
- List of loanwords in Tagalog
- Commission on the Filipino Language
- UP Diksiyonaryong Filipino

== Additional sources ==
- New Vicassan's English–Pilipino Dictionary by Vito C. Santos, ISBN 971-27-0349-5
- Learn Filipino: Book One by Victor Eclar Romero ISBN 1-932956-41-7
- Lonely Planet Filipino/Tagalog (Travel Talk) ISBN 1-59125-364-0
- Lonely Planet Pilipino Phrasebook ISBN 0-86442-432-9
- UP Diksyonaryong Filipino by Virgilio S. Almario (ed.) ISBN 971-8781-98-6, and ISBN 971-8781-99-4
- English–Pilipino Dictionary, Consuelo T. Panganiban, ISBN 971-08-5569-7
- Diksyunaryong Filipino–English, Komisyon sa Wikang Filipino, ISBN 971-8705-20-1
- New English–Filipino Filipino–English Dictionary, by Maria Odulio de Guzman ISBN 971-08-1776-0
- "When I was a child I spoke as a child": Reflecting on the Limits of a Nationalist Language Policy by Danilo Manarpaac. In: The politics of English as a world language: new horizons in postcolonial cultural studies by Christian Mair. Rodopi; 2003 ISBN 978-90-420-0876-2. p. 479–492.
