= Philippine Braille =

Braille alphabet used in the Philippines

Philippine Braille Filipino Braille
- Script type: Alphabet
- Print basis: Filipino alphabet; Abakada alphabet
- Languages: Tagalog, Ilocano, Cebuano, Hiligaynon, Bicol

Related scripts
- Parent systems: Braille: English Braille; Philippine Braille

Philippine Braille or Filipino Braille (Filipino: Braille ng Pilipinas) is the braille alphabet of the Philippines. Besides Filipino (Tagalog), essentially the same alphabet is used for Ilocano, Cebuano, Hiligaynon and Bicol.

Philippine Braille is based on the 26 letters of the basic braille alphabet used for Grade-1 English Braille, so the print digraph ng is written as a digraph ⠝⠛ in braille as well. The print letter ñ is rendered with the generic accent point, ⠈⠝. These are considered part of the alphabet, which is therefore,

a	b	c	d	e	f	g	h	i	j
k	l	m	n	ñ		ng		o	p
q	r	s	t	u	v	w	x	y	z

Numbers and punctuation are as in traditional English Braille, though the virgule / is ⠸⠌ as in Unified English Braille.

== Works cited ==
- UNESCO (2013). World Braille Usage (PDF) (3rd ed.). Perkins; International Council on English Braille; and National Library Service for the Blind and Physically Handicapped, Library of Congress. ISBN 978-0-8444-9564-4.
