= Filipino orthography =

Writing conventions in Filipino and other Philippine languages

Filipino orthography (Filipino: Ortograpiyang Filipino, Palatitikang Filipino) specifies the correct use of the writing system of the Filipino language, the national language and one of the two official languages of the Philippines.

In 2013, the Commission on the Filipino Language (Filipino: Komisyon sa Wikang Filipino) published Ortograpiyang Pambansa ("National Orthography"), a new set of guidelines that resolved long-standing issues in phonemic representation across Philippine languages. This was supplemented in 2014 by KWF Manwal sa Masinop na Pagsulat ("KWF Handbook on Proper Writing"), which provided a broader scope of typographic, stylistic, and formatting guidelines not previously covered. Together, these laid the groundwork for the Commission's Harmonization of Orthographies of Filipino Languages (Filipino: Armonisasyon ng Ortograpiya ng mga Wika ng Pilipinas) initiative, with the Filipino orthography as the "universal model" for all existing and upcoming state-sanctioned orthographies. Since regional and local orthographies may adapt national guidelines to represent phonemes absent in Tagalog, on which Filipino is originally based, this has led to the introduction of new graphemes and diacritics in Filipino as well as the reintroduction of historical Spanish-based letters and digraphs.

== Alphabet ==
Each grapheme in the Alpabeto is called a títik, most of which represent a distinctive sound. They are classified as a patínig (vowel) or a katínig (consonant). The letters W and Y may be classified as a malápatínig (semivowel). The letters are alphabetized and pronounced in the same way as in English, save for the létra (letter) Ñ and digrápo (digraph) NG. As for the additional graphemes for other Philippine languages, see Filipino alphabet.

| Letter/ Digraph | Name | Phoneme | Note |
|---|---|---|---|
| A | ey | /a/ | Becomes [ɐ] in unstressed syllables and [ä] in stressed syllables. |
| B | bi | /b/ | |
| C | si | /k/, /s/ | For unassimilated words in Spanish and English, ⟨ca, co, cu⟩ generally represent /k/, while ⟨ce, ci⟩ generally represent /s/. Also used in Philippine languages where /tʃ/ is orthographically preserved as ⟨ch⟩. Historically, words now written with ⟨ka, ko, ku⟩ were written with ⟨ca, co, cu⟩ under the Abesedaryo. |
| D | di | /d/ | In Tagalog, often allophonic with /ɾ/ in intervocalic position, which is usually reflected in spelling (e.g., dami "amount" vs. marami "many"). However, not all words follow this convention (e.g., dali "ease" vs. madali "easy"), and some have diverged to carry distinct meanings (e.g., madamdamin "passionate" vs. maramdamin "sensitive"). |
| E | i | /e/, /ə/ | Normally [e ~ e̞], but can become [ɛ] in emphatic speech. Also normally /ə/ in words from Philippine languages where it occurs, as the dedicated letter Ë was only introduced in 2013. |
| F | ef | /f/ | Often indistinguishable from [p]. Generally used for proper names (e.g., Felix, Ifugao) and words of English origin (e.g., fakulti "teaching staff"). Also used in Filipino words of Tëduray origin (e.g., faga "meteorite") and in Philippine languages where /f/ occurs. |
| G | ji (Note: The spellings "eych", "ji", "jey", and "enji" have been used by the Komisyon sa Wikang Filipino since at least its August 2007 draft of Ortograpiyang Pambansa, as well as in Giya sa Ortograpiyang Bikol (2012), predating KWF Manwal sa Masinop na Pagsulat (2014) and later orthographies of many Philippine languages.), dyi, diyí (Note: This is the standard spelling in Filipino under a strict application of Section 5.2 of KWF Manwal sa Masinop na Pagsulat (2014).) | /ɡ/, /dʒ/, /h/, /ɰ/ | For unassimilated foreign words, ⟨ga, go, gu⟩ generally represent /g/ in English and Spanish, while ⟨ge, gi⟩ generally represent /dʒ/ in English and /h/ in Spanish. Also normally /ɰ/ in Philippine languages where it occurs, such as Boînën (e.g., sugud (Note: Common spelling: sugud Preferred spelling: sexed Standard spelling: sëg̓ëd) "spouse"), as the dedicated letter G̓ was only introduced in 2023. Historically, words now written with ⟨ge, gi⟩ were written with ⟨gue, gui⟩ under the Abesedaryo. |
| H | eych, eyts | /h/ | Sometimes pronounced [e̞tʃ]. |
| I | ay | /i/ | Becomes [ɪ] in unstressed syllables and [i] in stressed syllables. |
| J | jey, dyey, diyéy | /dʒ/, /h/ | Sometimes indistinguishable from [ds] or [s]. Usually respelled with ⟨dy, diy⟩ to represent [dʒ] or [ʒ], or with ⟨h⟩ to represent [h] or [x]. For unassimilated foreign words, ⟨j⟩ generally represents [dʒ] and [ʒ] in English, and [h] and [x] in Spanish. Also used in Filipino words of Bahasa Sug origin (e.g., julup "imbecile") and in Philippine languages where /dʒ/ occurs. |
| K | key | /k/ | Not to be confused with [kʰ]. Always unaspirated in clear speech and often unreleased in coda (e.g., /aˈnak̚/ "child"). [kʷ] only with ⟨kw, kuw⟩ (e.g., bakwit "evacuee", kuwintas "necklace"). |
| L | el | /l/ | Also used in Philippine languages where /ʎ/ is orthographically preserved as ⟨ll⟩. |
| M | em | /m/ | |
| N | en | /n/ | [n.j ~ ɲ] only with ⟨ny, niy⟩ (e.g., pinya "pineapple", kaniya "his/her[s]/its"). |
| Ñ | énye | /ɲ/ | Usually respelled with ⟨ny, niy⟩. Generally used for proper names (e.g., Niño, Malacañang) and recent words of Spanish origin (e.g., ñu "wildebeest"). Also used in Ivatan (e.g., iñinen "to lament"), Ichbayaten (e.g., hañin "typhoon"), and other Philippine languages where /ɲ/ occurs. |
| NG | énji, éndyi, éndiyí | /ŋ/ | Comparable to ⟨ng⟩ in English along and singer. Not to be confused with the indirect case marker ng pronounced [nɐŋ]. [ŋg] only in words of Spanish origin containing ⟨ngl, ngr⟩ (e.g., Ingles "English", kongreso "congress"). |
| O | o, ow | /o/ | Normally [o ~ o̞], but can become [ɔ] in emphatic speech. |
| P | pi | /p/ | Not to be confused with [pʰ]. Always unaspirated in clear speech and often unreleased in coda (e.g., /haˈrap̚/ "front"). [pʷ] only with ⟨pw, puw⟩ (e.g., datapwat "nevertheless", kapuwa "fellow"). |
| Q | kyu, kiyú | /kʷ/, /k/ | Usually respelled with ⟨kw, kuw, k⟩. Generally used for proper names (e.g., Tariq, Siquijor) and words of English (e.g., quits), Spanish (e.g., quedan "warehouse receipt"), and Arabic origins (e.g., talaq "husband-initiated divorce"). Also used for Filipino words of ultimate Latin origin (e.g., quorum) and in Philippine languages where ⟨q⟩ is orthographically preserved. Historically, words now written with ⟨ke, ki⟩ were written with ⟨que, qui⟩ under the Abesedaryo. |
| R | ar | /ɾ/ | Normally [ɾ], but can become [r ~ ɹ] within consonant clusters. Also used in Philippine languages where /r/ is orthographically preserved as ⟨rr⟩. |
| S | es | /s/ | |
| T | ti | /t/ | Not to be confused with [tʰ]. Always unaspirated in clear speech and often unreleased in coda (e.g., /ˈapat̚/ "four"). [tʷ] only with ⟨tw, tuw⟩ (e.g., estatwa "statue", tuwina "at all times") and in a few exceptions (e.g., bituin "star"). |
| U | yu | /u/, /ə/ | Becomes [ʊ] in unstressed syllables and [u] in stressed syllables. Also normally /ə/ in words from Philippine languages where it occurs, as the dedicated letter Ë was only introduced in 2013. |
| V | vi | /v/ | Often indistinguishable from [b]. Generally used for proper names (e.g., Valdez, Davao) and words of English origin (e.g., varayti "variety"). Also used in Filipino words of Chabacano origin (e.g., vinta "outrigger boat") and in Philippine languages where /v/ occurs. |
| W | dóbolyú | /w/ | |
| X | eks | /ks/, /s/, /h/, /z/, /ɰ/, /ɣ/ | Usually respelled with ⟨eks, ks, s, h, z⟩. Generally used for proper names (e.g., Roxas, Mexico) and words of English origin (e.g., xerox "photocopy"). Also used in Filipino words of Isnëg origin (e.g., xaddan "malaria-related myalgia"). Also normally /ɰ/ or /ɣ/ in words from Philippine languages where they occur, such as Boînën (e.g., axag (Note: Common spelling: agag Preferred spelling: axag Standard spelling: ag̓ag) "to appropriate") and Ichbayaten (e.g., maxnep "high tide"), as the dedicated letter G̓ was only introduced in 2023. |
| Y | way | /j/, /i/ | Generally /i/ for proper names (e.g., Syquia, Famy) and words of English origin (e.g., party-list "proportional representation system for under-represented sectors"). For common nouns, /i/ only with the conjunction y ("and") within phrases of Spanish origin (e.g., ala-una y medya "one-thirty"). Historically, words now written beginning with ⟨i⟩ were written beginning with ⟨y⟩ under the Abesedaryo, as evident in surnames (e.g., Ybañez, Ybarra) and archaic place names (e.g., Yligan, Ylocos) and plant names (e.g., ylang-ylang (Note: The standard spelling in Filipino is "ilang-ilang".), ypil). |
| Z | zi | /z/ | Often indistinguishable from [s]. Generally used for proper names (e.g., Mendoza, Zamboanga) and words of English origin (e.g., zigzag). Also used in Filipino words of Ibanag origin (e.g., ziga "hardship") and in Philippine languages where /z/ occurs, such as Porohanon (e.g., kazu "fire"). Sometimes pronounced [zeɪ̯]. |

== Glottal stop and diacritic marks ==
When glottal stop (impit na tunog) occurs at the beginning of a word or between vowel letters, it is not written:

aso /ˈʔaso/
kain /ˈkaʔin/

After a consonant, it is written as a hyphen (gitling):

pang-araw /paŋˈʔaraw/

At the end of a word, it is indicated with a grave accent mark ⟨`⟩ (paiwà):

batà /ˈbataʔ/

Final stress is indicated with an acute accent mark ⟨´⟩ (pahilís):

sakít /saˈkit/

(The acute accent mark is also used in foreign loan words, particularly Spanish)

When both acute and grave accents occur on the same letter, they merge into a circumflex ⟨ˆ⟩ (pakupyâ):

likô /liˈkoʔ/

The glottal stop disappears when followed by another word and the vowel lengthened especially in urban speech, but is generally retained.

The acute, grave, and circumflex accent marks (tuldik or asento) are not mandatory in writing. Generally, they are used to show pronunciation or to distinguish homonyms.

Indicating stress by an acute accent is encouraged, especially when distinguishing between homonyms, both within Tagalog and with other Philippine languages, e.g. húli vs hulí

The prefix ma- may be spelled with an acute accent when it indicates an accidental action or event to distinguish it from a homophone with a different part of speech or a similarly-spelled word, e.g. mádulas vs madulás, mápatay vs mamatay, máhulí vs mahuli, and másáma and masamâ.

Orthographies of some other Philippine languages also have additional accents: the macron (pahaba) is used in Cebuano, Gaddang, and Kamayo (Kinamayú) for long vowels, and the arc (arko) is used in Boînën to show that two adjacent vowels are pronounced without a glottal stop.

== Notes on Filipino orthography ==
- C, F, J, Ñ, Q, V, X, and Z are used mostly for loanwords, regional words and proper nouns.
- The vowels are A, E, I, O, and U.
- Usual diacritic marks are acute ⟨´⟩, grave ⟨`⟩, circumflex ⟨ˆ⟩, diaeresis ⟨¨⟩ which are optional, and only used with the vowels. Grave ⟨`⟩ and circumflex ⟨ˆ⟩ may only appear at the end of a word ending in a vowel. Diacritics have no impact on collation or alphabetical order. Possible combinations include: á, à, â, é, è, ê, ë, ë́, ë̀, ë̂, í, ì, î, ó, ò, ô, ú, ù, û. Historically, the tilde was used with <g> (g̃) in many Philippine languages. It was notably used to shorten the words nang (ergative case marker) and man͠gá (pluralization particle) into ng̃ and mg̃á respectively. Today, these two words are just simply written as ng and mga. In modern orthography, the conjunction or particle nang and the preposition ng are distinguished, although they are both pronounced /naŋ/.
- Ñ is considered as a separate letter, instead of a letter-diacritical mark combination.
- The alphabet also uses the Ng digraph, even originally with a large tilde that spanned both n and g (as in n͠g) when a vowel follows the digraph. This tilde indicates that the "n͠g" and the vowel should be pronounced as one syllable, such as "n͠ga" in the three-syllable word "pan͠galan" ("name") – syllabicated as [pa-n͠ga-lan], not [pan-ga-lan]. The use of the tilde over the two letters is now obsolete. Due to technical constraints, machine-printed variants of "n͠ga" emerged, which included "ñga", "ng̃a", and even "gña" (which is conserved in the geographical name Sagñay, Camarines Sur).
- The Ng digraph letter is similar to, but not the same as, the prepositional word ng ("of"/"of the"), originally spelled ng̃ (with a tilde over the g only). The words ng and ng̃ are shortened forms of the word nang.
- Ë is a new variant of e introduced in 2013 to represent /ə/ (schwa) in Austronesian words of non-Tagalog origin.
- D and R are commonly interchangeable depending on the letter's location: "D" becomes "R" if there is a preceding vowel, e.g. dagat ("sea") to mandaragat ("seafarer"), dunong ("intelligence") to marunong ("knowledgeable"). This does not, however, apply to some words such as dumadagundong ("booming") as well as loanwords and proper nouns.

== History ==
=== Pre-Hispanic scripts ===
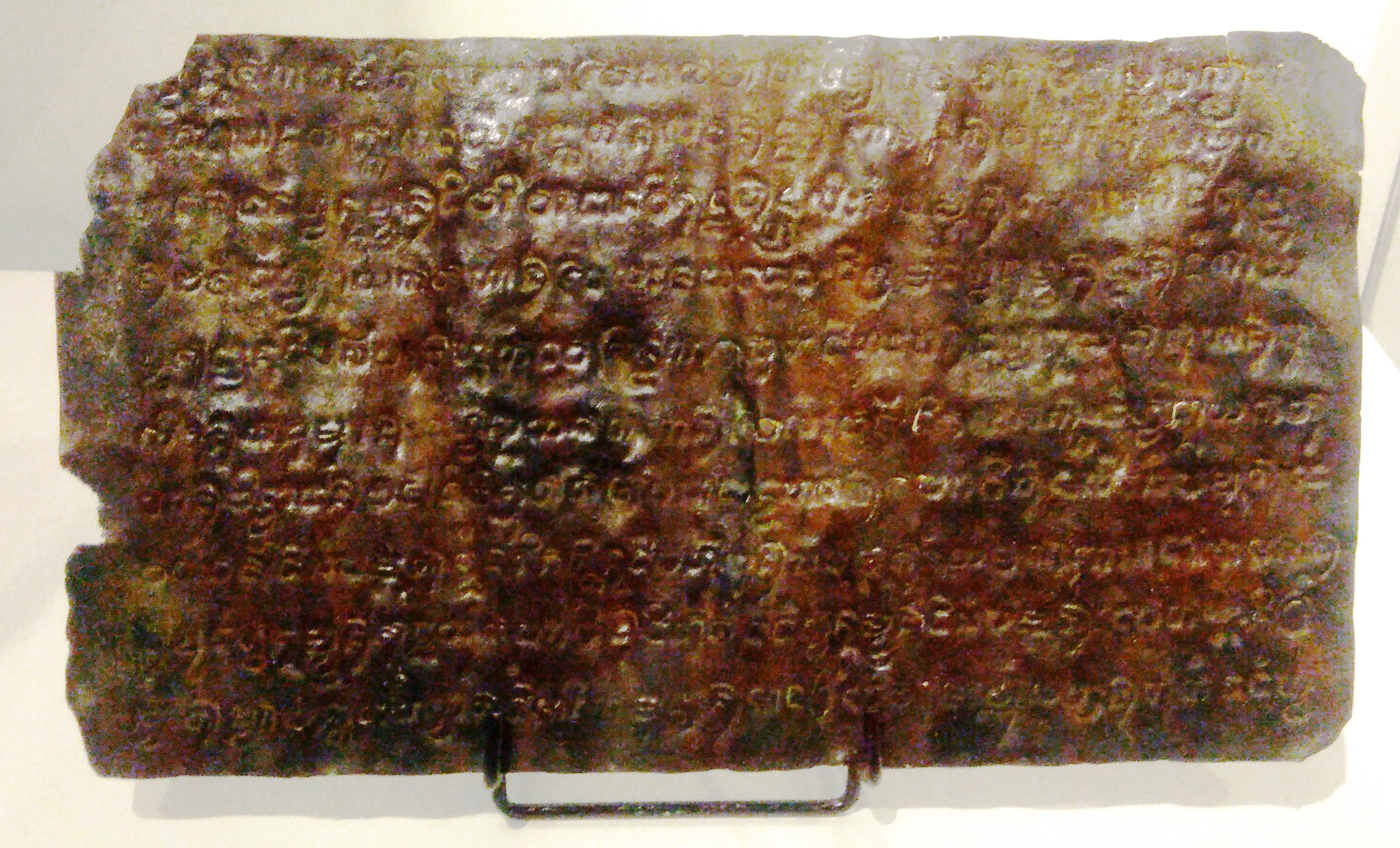
Laguna Copperplate Inscription (c. 900)

During the Pre-Hispanic Era, most of the languages of the Philippines were written in abugida, an ancient segmental writing system. Examples of this ancient Philippine writing system which descended from the Brāhmī script are the Kawi, Baybayin, Buhid, Hanunó'o, Tagbanwa, Butuan, Kulitan and other Brahmic family of scripts known to antiquity. A controversial and debatable script of the Philippines is the Eskayan script.

Baybayin script began to decline in the 17th century and became obsolete in the 18th century. The scripts that are still in use today by the indigenous Mangyan groups of the Philippines are the Buhid and the Hanunó'o script.

=== Adoption of the Latin script ===
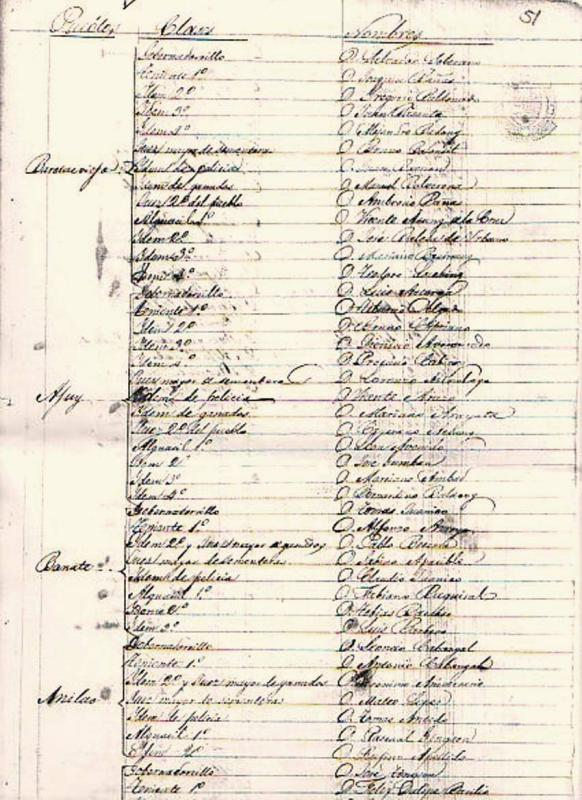
Result of Election of the Principalía of Iloilo in 1855

When the Spaniards arrived in 1521 and began to colonize the islands of the Philippines in 1565, they introduced the Latin script to the Catholicized Filipinos. When most of the Philippine languages were first written in the Latin script, they used the Spanish alphabet. This alphabet was called the Abecedario, the original alphabet of the Catholicized Filipinos, which variously had either 28, 29, 31, or 32 letters. Until the first half of the 20th century, most Philippine languages were widely written in a variety of ways based on Spanish orthography.

The writing system of the Muslim Filipinos in the different independent sultanates of Mindanao during the Spanish colonization shifted from abugida script to Arabic alphabet while the writing system of most of the Catholicized Chinese Filipinos shifted from Written Chinese to Abecedario alphabet.

Virtually unutilized from the Abecedario were the letters K and W, which are both used extensively in most Philippine languages today due to the imposition of the Abakada alphabet. Relics of this Abecedario alphabet can still be seen in the way "Castilianized" indigenous and Chinese-origin surnames are written. Some examples of indigenous Filipino surnames are Macasáquit, Guintô, Bañaga, Guipit, Abucajo, Abueg, Bangachon, Dagohoy, Valarao and Dimaculañgan. Some examples of Chinese-origin surnames are Guanzón, Cojuangco, Siapuatco, Yapchulay, Locsín, Quisumbing, Tuazon and Yuchengco. Many indigenous place names are also written using Spanish orthography, often either coexisting or competing with their indigenized forms if they exist (Bulacán or Bulakán, Caloocan or Kalookan, Taguig or Tagig, etc.). Parañaque would be written in the indigenized system as Paranyake, but the latter spelling is so far unaccepted and not known in use. Marikina on the other hand gained acceptance over the older Mariquina.

Quite notable are proper nouns wherein the letter Y is written before consonants and is pronounced I. Iloilo and Ilocos were spelled archaically as Yloylo or Yloílo and Ylocos. Surnames in the Philippines such as Ybañez, Ysagan, Ybarra, Yldefonso and Ylagan are evidences of the Old Spanish writing system. Ylang Ylang, a native Philippine tree valued for its perfume, is another example. The use of the letter Y at the beginning of words, however, gradually shifted to the letter I reflecting revisions in Spanish orthography.

The representation of certain sounds were largely derived from Spanish orthography but differed in several ways. The letter H was utilized to represent the voiceless glottal fricative (/h/) in the orthographies of most Philippine languages during the Spanish period in contrast to the orthography of Spanish which uses the letter J (the letter H in Spanish is silent). Spanish loanwords like Jesús, Justicia, or Jardín, however, often retained their original spelling in Spanish. Archaic use of the letter X in the Old Spanish writing system that is pronounced in a guttural way (quite similar phonetically to H in English even though the sound is different) is evident in surnames such as Roxas. Another example is México, Pampanga.

To represent /k/, "c" was used before the vowels "a", "o", and "u" (i.e. cayo, cong, culang) and at final positions (pumasoc) while a silent "u" was used between "q" and "e" or "i" (i.e. "aquing", "quilala") reflecting Spanish orthography. This is because should "c" be utilized before either "i" or "e", the sound produced would instead be representing /s/ (like Spanish ciudad). These two combination of letters ("ci" and "ce") were not used in native words and "s" was used in all cases to represent /s/. Likewise, in representing /ɡ/, "g" was used before "a", "o", "u" (i.e. "gamit", "tago", "gutom") and at final positions while a silent "u" was used between "g" and "e" or "i" to (i.e. "guitna") so that "gue" represents /ɡe/ and "gui" represents /ɡi/.

The letter W as used today was absent. Instead, "u" was utilized ("gaua", "aua", "uala") and diphthongs written as "aw" today (araw) was written with "ao" (arao). Words like "huwag" and "kapwa" were written as houag and capoua.

A common practice in the orthography of some of the Philippine languages during the Spanish colonial period up to 1940 (occasionally used up to the 1960s) was the use of tilde written over g̃, a letter which was notably used to shorten the words nang (ergative case marker) and man͠gá (pluralization particle) into ng̃ and mg̃á respectively. No literature could be found that pertained to the rules that governed the usage of this letter or that explained its disappearance. Today, these two words are just simply written as ng and mga.

Originally, there was a large tilde that spanned both n and g (as in n͠g) when a vowel follows the Ng digraph. This tilde indicates that the n͠g and the vowel should be pronounced as one syllable, such as n͠ga in the three-syllable word pan͠galan (English: name) – syllabicated as [pa-n͠ga-lan], not [pan-ga-lan]. In modern orthography, the tilde over ng is not used, thus pangalan.

Due to technical constraints, machine-printed variants of n͠ga emerged, which included ñga, ng̃a, and even gña as in the case of Sagñay – syllabicated as [sa-ngay]. The Ng digraph letter is similar to, but not the same as, the prepositional word ng (English: of/of the), originally spelled ng̃ with a tilde over the g only. The words ñg and ng̃ are shortened forms of the word nang. There are some words with no tilde written over the ng digraph as in the case of barangay (Filipino: baranggay Spanish: barangay) from the Tagalog word balan͠gay since it is syllabicated as [ba-rang-gay]. Ilonggo used to be written as Ylongo or Ilongo without a tilde over the ng since it is syllabicated as [i-long-go]. Another example is Zamboanga syllabicated as [zam-bo-ang-ga]. Words that end in ng digraph such as ang (English: the), utang (English: debt) and saguing (English: banana) also didn't have tildes over the n or g or both ng.

Contraction of certain words were indicated by two commas such as iba and at → "iba, t,"; Indicated today by a single quotation mark as in English (i.e. iba't).

Diacritic marks were also utilized. Acute ( ´ ), grave ( ` ) and circumflex ( ˆ ) were required and only used with the vowels. The latter two may only appear at the end of a word ending in a vowel. Diacritics had no impact on the primary alphabetical order. Possible combinations include: á, à, â, é, è, ê, í, ì, î, ó, ò, ô, ú, ù and û.

Punctuation marks were also borrowed from Spanish. Quotation marks like « » instead of the quotation marks (" ") were used. The inverted question mark (¿) and inverted exclamation mark (¡) were also utilized at the beginning of phrases ending with either the regular question mark/exclamation mark.

The vowels were pronounced in a short vowel length [A (ah), E (eh), I (ih), O (oh), U (uh)] while the consonants were pronounced as B (be), C (se), Ch (che), D (de), F (efe), G (he), H (ache), J (hota), K (ka), L (ele), LL (elye), M (eme), N (ene), NG (nang), Ñ (enye), Ñg or Ng̃ or N͠g or Gñ (ñga or ng̃a or n͠ga or gña), P (pe), Q (ku), R (ere), RR (er-re), S (ese), T (te), V (ve), W (wa), X (ekis), Y (ya or i griega or ye), Z (zeta). This alphabet gradually fell out of use since 1940 due to the imposition of the Abakada alphabet.

Collation of the Abecedario (32 letters):

Majuscule Forms
| A | B | C | Ch | D | E | F | G | H | I | J | K | L | Ll | M | N | Ng | Ñ | Ng̃ or Ñg or N͠g or Gñ | O | P | Q | R | Rr | S | T | U | V | W | X | Y | Z |
Minuscule Forms
| a | b | c | ch | d | e | f | g | h | i | j | k | l | ll | m | n | ng | ñ | ng̃ or ñg or n͠g or gñ | o | p | q | r | rr | s | t | u | v | w | x | y | z |

=== Late 19th-century orthographic reforms ===
Filipino doctor and student of languages Trinidad Pardo de Tavera in his 1887 essay El Sanscrito en la lengua Tagalog made use of a new Tagalog orthography rather than what had then been in use. In 1889, the new bilingual La España Oriental, of which Isabelo de los Reyes was an editor, newspaper began publishing using the new orthography stating in a footnote that it would "use the orthography recently introduced by ... learned Orientalis". This new orthography, while having its supporters, was also not initially accepted by several writers. Soon after the first issue of La España, Pascual H. Poblete's Revista Católica de Filipina began a series of articles attacking the new orthography and its proponents. A fellow writer, Pablo Tecson was also critical. The attacks included that the letters "k" and "w" were of German origin and foreign in nature, thus those promoting it were deemed "unpatriotic". These two publications would eventually merge as La Lectura Popular in January 1890 and would eventually make use of both spelling systems in its articles.

Pedro Serrano y Laktaw, a schoolteacher, published the first Spanish-Tagalog dictionary using the new orthography in 1889. In April 1890, Jose Rizal authored an article Sobre la Nueva Ortografia de la Lengua Tagalog in the Madrid-based periodical La Solidaridad. In it, he addressed the logicality, in his opinion, of the new orthography and its criticisms, including those by Pobrete and Tecson. Rizal described the orthography promoted by Tavera as "more perfect" than what he himself had developed. José Rizal had also suggested a reform of the orthography of the Philippine languages by replacing the letters C and Q with K. Rizal got the idea after reading an 1884 essay by Trinidad Pardo de Tavera about the ancient Baybayin script. The new orthography was however not broadly adopted initially and was used inconsistently in the bilingual periodicals of Manila.

Prior to the official establishment of the 20-letter Abakada by Lope K. Santos in 1940, the post-reform alphabet effectively functioned as an early version of the Abakada, containing 17 to 20 letters depending on letter classification. Following the late 19th-century orthographic reforms, this alphabet was mainly used by nationalist writers, reformist intellectuals, revolutionary leaders, and publications associated with the Katipunan and the anti-colonial movement.

While it included the same core sounds and symbols that would later comprise the 20-letter Abakada, lexicographers of this era organized them into 17 primary alphabetical sections. This was because E was categorized under I, O was categorized under U, and R was categorized under D due to their historical sound-shifting relationships and roots in Baybayin. Over time, as these letters gained recognition as distinct standalone entries in lexicography, this system directly evolved into the formalized 20-letter Abakada.

The revolutionary society Kataás-taasan, Kagalang-galang Katipunan ng̃ mg̃á Anak ng̃ Bayan or Katipunan made use of the k-orthography and the letter k featured prominently on many of its flags and insignias.

=== Filipino as the national language, the Abakada, and expanded alphabet (1940–1987) ===
Article XIII, section 3 of the 1935 Constitution of the Philippines provided for the "...development and adoption of a common national language based on one of the existing native languages". For this purpose, the Institute of National Language (INL) was subsequently set-up. After numerous debates among the different language representatives of the Philippines, the NLI passed a resolution dated November 9, 1937 recommending that Tagalog serve as basis for the national language. President Manuel L. Quezon issued Executive Order 134 in December 1937 officially proclaiming this decision.

In 1940, the Balarílà ng Wikang Pambansâ (English: Grammar of the National Language) of grammarian Lope K. Santos introduced the Abakada alphabet. This alphabet consists of 20 letters and became the standard alphabet of the national language. The alphabet was officially adopted by the Institute for the Tagalog-Based National Language to “indigenize" the writing system (The Latin script itself (the alphabet) was introduced by the Catholic missionaries of Spain, leaving nothing really to "indigenize").

The Spanish-based orthographies of other Philippine languages that were still using its old orthography began to be gradually replaced with the propagation of the new K-orthographies as more people became familiar with it. The Spanish-based orthographies were gradually wiped out since 1940, due to the imposition of Abakada. The Abakada orthography gradually influenced the languages of the Philippines.

The Abakada orthography was guided by the Balarilà of Santos. Vowels were pronounced with a short vowel length, while consonants were pronounced by appending short A's at the end. Hence, the name Abakada, from the first 4 letters of the alphabet.

Collation of the Abakada (20 letters):

Majuscule Forms
| A | B | K | D | E | G | H | I | L | M | N | Ng | O | P | R | S | T | U | W | Y |
Minuscule Forms
| a | b | k | d | e | g | h | i | l | m | n | ng | o | p | r | s | t | u | w | y |

The Wikang pambansa (national language) was designated as Pilipino in 1959. In 1971, the alphabet was expanded to 31 letters: a, b, c, ch, d, e, f, g, h, i, j, k, l, ll, m, n, ñ, ng, o, p, q, r, rr, s, t, u, v, w, x, y, z.

==== 1977 spelling reform ====
The orthography was reformed with the 1977 orthography, with the enforcement of Department Memorandum No. 194, s. 1976 by the Department of Education, Culture and Sports (DECS) and publication of Mga Tuntunin sa Ortograpiyang Filipino: Mga Patnubay na Sinusunod sa Pagwawasto ng mga Aklat Babasahin by the Surian ng Wikang Pambansa (SWP, the Institute of the National Language).

Some of the spellings affected are:

- spellings containing the vowel pairs /ia/, /ie/, /io/, /iu/ /ua/, /ue/, /ui/, /uo/, where the new spelling have the ⟨i⟩ or ⟨u⟩ retained with ⟨y⟩ or ⟨w⟩ inserted after, or replaced with ⟨w⟩ and ⟨y⟩.
- most single-word compounds involving the univerbation of two words containing the clitic ligatures -ng and -g, where they become -n-.

=== Modern Filipino alphabet (1987–present) ===
In 1987, the official language called Pilipino was renamed to Filipino. Article XIV Section 6 of the 1987 Constitution states that "the National language of the Philippines is Filipino. As it evolves, it shall be further developed and enriched on the basis of existing Philippine and other languages".

The Pilipino alphabet was reduced to 28 letters, with the Spanish Ch, Ll and Rr digraphs being dropped from being considered as distinct letters (The Association of Spanish Language Academies itself abandoned the use of Ch and Ll as separate listings in alphabetical collations in 1994. Since 2010, ch and ll are no longer considered distinct letters. Each digraph is now treated as a sequence of two distinct characters, finding occasional use as conjoined pairs.).

The Modern Filipino alphabet is primarily English alphabet plus the Spanish Ñ and Tagalog Ng digraph; these are alphabetised separately in theory. Today, the Modern Filipino alphabet is used, and may also serve as the alphabet for all languages of the Philippines; in orthographies of some languages, additional letters are introduced.

Collation of the Modern Filipino Alphabet (28 letters):

Majuscule Forms
| A | B | C | D | E | F | G | H | I | J | K | L | M | N | Ñ | Ng | O | P | Q | R | S | T | U | V | W | X | Y | Z |
Minuscule Forms
| a | b | c | d | e | f | g | h | i | j | k | l | m | n | ñ | ng | o | p | q | r | s | t | u | v | w | x | y | z |

== The Orthography of the National Language ==
The orthography was reformed with the 2007 orthography, with the publication of the 2007 revision to the Ortograpiya ng Wikang Pambansa by the Komisyon sa Wikang Filipino (KWF, the Commission on the Filipino Language).

The document begins by detailing the letters of the alphabet, their order and their names. One set of names is based on English letter names; the other, similar to the former Abakada. Some exceptional names are those letters which were not part of the Abakada: C, se, Q, kwa and X, eksa.

It goes on to name punctuation marks, and describes the use of the acute, grave and circumflex accents in Filipino. Words that already exist in the language are preferred over a borrowed term, for example, tuntunin vs. rul (derived from English rule). In terms of spelling, issues concerning the use of y-/iy- and w-/uw- are codified according to the number of preceding consonants and the origin of the word if it is borrowed. The spelling reform generally affected variant spellings of words featuring the vowel pairs ⟨ia⟩, ⟨ie⟩, ⟨io⟩, ⟨ua⟩, ⟨ue⟩, and ⟨ui⟩ following a consonant (in the first syllable) or a consonant pair (in other positions) where the first vowel is not kept when a ⟨w⟩ or ⟨y⟩ is inserted as in the 1977 rule introduced by the Mga Batayang Tuntuning Sinusunod sa Pagsusuring Aklat by the Surian sa Wikang Pambansa (SWP, or Institute of the National Language).

Lastly, the document provides spelling guidelines for words of foreign origin. It focuses mainly on the two languages that have provided a large number of lexical items to the Filipino language, namely Spanish and English. In short, regarding borrowings from these two languages, Spanish words of common usage are written in a manner consistent with Filipino phonology. These words are already in common usage, thus they will not revert to their Spanish spelling. On the other hand, if the words come from English or another foreign source or if the term is derived from Spanish that does not already have a phonetic spelling, it should be spelled phonetically and the use of the 8 new letters is allowed.

Examples:

- Spanish teléfono = telépono NOT *teléfono
- English psychology = saykoloji
- Spanish psicología or sicología = sikolohíya
- Spanish silla = silya
- Spanish cuchara = kutsara
- Spanish caballo = kabayo

=== 2013 spelling reform ===
Another reform in 2013 which took effect in 2014, with the publication of the 2013 Ortograpiyang Pambansa and the 2014 Manwal sa Masinop na Pagsulat, affirmed the full use of the 8 letters added to the Filipino alphabet, and reinforced etymological spelling of loanwords.

- Alternative forms interchanging ⟨e⟩ and ⟨i⟩, and ⟨o⟩ and ⟨u⟩ (some remained standard). This rule is added to avoid confusion and counter the effect of /e~i/ and /o~u/ allophony in spelling (especially in loanwords).
- Alternative forms starting with ⟨is⟩ of Spanish loanwords starting with ⟨es⟩. Under the 2014 reform, spellings starting with ⟨is⟩ has been reserved to English borrowings where the original word starts with an ⟨s⟩ followed by another consonant.

Komisyon sa Wikang Filipino has continued to promote it's use through seminars and workshops.on october 2025,KWF and University of Southern Mindanao held a seminar on Filipino spelling and official correspondence. In January 2026 the Commission conducted a seminar on official correspondence at University of the Assumption in Pampanga. These activities aimed to encourage proper use of Filipino in schools and government offices.

== Syllabification ==
Tagalog words can have these syllable structures: V, CV, CVC, CCV, VCC, CVCC, CCVC, CCVCC, CCVCCC. In other Philippine languages, syllable structures can be different, see Comparison of orthographies of languages of the Philippines.

Rules on syllabification are as follows:

1. When there are two or more vowels in the initial, central and final positions, each are hyphenated separately.
2. When there are two consecutive consonants within a word, the first are included on the preceding syllable while the second in the following one.
3. When there are three consecutive consonants in the word, the first two follows the vowel of the preceding syllable and the third goes to the following syllable
4. When the first of three consecutive consonants is an M or N and the following are either BL, BR, DR, PL, and TR, the first consonant follows the vowel of the preceding vowel, and the remaining two goes to the following syllable.
5. When there are four consecutive consonants within a word, the first two follows the vowel of the previous syllable, and the other two are part of the following syllables.

== Loanwords ==
A radical change in Tagalog orthography is the addition of the letters C, F, J, Ñ, Q, V, X, and Z, which allows retaining the spellings of words in other indigenous languages where they are used. New loanwords from foreign languages are also covered by the new alphabet, so they are allowed to be kept in their original spellings.

- Borrowings from other Philippine languages: Loans from other Philippine languages with sounds not found in Tagalog do not have to be respelled to abakada. This is the case when they are spelled with the eight new letters of the Filipino alphabet. For example, the name of the Ifugao tribe and language do not have to be respelled to Ipugaw to conform to abakada spelling, but can be spelled as Ifugaw.
- New loanwords: New loanwords from Spanish, English and other foreign languages do not have to be respelled to abakada. New loans from Spanish (e.g. futbol, fosil, visa, vertebra) do not have to respelled into the abakada, if they are not listed in these two major dictionaries, the Diccionario tagalo-hispano (1914) by Pedro Serrano-Laktaw, and the Diksiyunaryo-tesauro Pilipino-Ingles (1972) by Jose Villa Panganiban. English loanwords are not required to be respelled as well (e.g. fern, folder, jam, jar, envoy, develop).
- Previous Spanish loanwords: Previous Spanish loanwords are kept in their existing spelling using the abakada. For example: kabayo ‘horse’, porma ‘form’, keso ‘cheese’ (from Spanish caballo, forma, queso).
- Proper nouns: Proper nouns from foreign languages are kept in original spelling. Many personal and geographical names in the Philippines, not only of Spanish origin but also native Tagalog or originating in other Philippine languages, conserve Spanish-styled spelling conventions that are otherwise obsolete or deprecated for writing Philippine languages (such as ⟨c⟩ or ⟨qu⟩ for ⟨k⟩, ⟨gñ⟩ for ⟨ng⟩), e.g. dela Cruz, Nueva Ecija, Roxas, Calamba, Parañaque, Sagñay.
- Experimental respelling of English and other borrowings: Respellings of borrowings from English and other foreign languages according to their pronunciation (using abakada letters and also ⟨f, j, v, z⟩) are permitted, provided they are easy to read, and take in consideration their cultural, religious, and political roots, and is not confused with another native word.
- Preference on Spanish borrowings: Due to the problems that arise when respelling English loanwords, borrowing from Spanish is preferred, especially where the English term to be borrowed is similar, as the Spanish orthography has better sound and letter correspondences with Tagalog than English. For example, instead of borrowing English standardization and respelling it to the lengthy *istandardiseysiyon, estandardisasyon, borrowing from Spanish estandardización is used.
- Non-respelling of English borrowings: It is allowed to retain English loanwords in their original spelling without phonetic respelling, if the respelled form would look too unusual, in particular for technical terms, e.g. bouquet, carbon dioxide, jaywalking. Hence, the letters ⟨c, q, x⟩ are used for proper names and for non-respelled English loanwords.
- Special case for y: y (from Spanish, meaning "and") is not respelled into i when used as part of a personal name with the maternal surname last (e.g. Emilio Aguinaldo y Famy), or used with Spanish-derived numerals (e.g. treynta y uno).
- Cases of Spanish borrowings with ⟨h⟩ pronounced. The letter ⟨h⟩ (hache) is not pronounced in Spanish, but in some loanwords, the ⟨h⟩ is kept to prevent confusion with a similar word. For example, Spanish historia, with the sense "history" is borrowed into Tagalog as historya to prevent confusion with istorya , also from the same etymon, but with the sense of "story". The also is also done with humano (from Spanish), which is borrowed without change to prevent confusion with native umano, so are the related terms humanismo.
- The letter ⟨j⟩: ⟨j⟩ is generally used to represent /d͡ʒ/, and is not used on Spanish loanwords (except proper nouns) spelled with that letter (and pronounced /h/), which are phonetically respelled into ⟨h⟩ (e.g. juez become huwes). The letter ⟨j⟩ is used on new borrowings from English and other foreign languages where spelled with ⟨j⟩ like jet, jazz, jester, jujitsu, but not those with /d͡ʒ/ which written with a different letter. Words like general, generator and region, if they will be borrowed, may be respelled phonetically with ⟨dy⟩ as *dyeneral, *dyenereytor, and *ridyon. English loanwords with ⟨j⟩ respelled to ⟨dy⟩ (e.g. dyaket, dyanitor, dyip) do not have to be restored to their original spellings.

Some Philippine languages use the Tagalog foreign letters in their native words, see Comparison of orthographies of languages of the Philippines.

== Vowel clusters/diphthongs ==
Diphthongs (diptonggo) or vowel clusters (kambal patinig) composed of a weak vowel like /i/ and /u/ at the initial position are treated in two ways.

- The first vowel disappears and is replaced by a ⟨y⟩ or ⟨w⟩ when the vowel pair is entirely in the second or another syllable of a word, e.g. tulyá, tilapyà, sawá.
- The first vowel is retained and a ⟨y⟩ or ⟨w⟩ is inserted if:
1. the vowel pair follows a consonant in the first syllable of a word, e.g. tíya (/ˈtia/), siyá (/siˈa/). An apostrophe replaces the first vowel if one wishes to omit the it when writing its spoken form, e.g. s'ya for siya.
2. the vowel pair follows a consonant cluster inside the word, e.g. impiyerno (/ʔimpiˈeɾno/) instead of impyerno, industriya (/ʔinˈdustɾia/) instead of *industrya). This is done for ease of hyphenation, to help learners of the language.
3. the vowel pair follows a /h/ sound (a weak consonant), e.g. kolehiyo (/koˈlehio/) instead of *kolehyo and rehiyon (/ɾehiˈon/) instead of *rehyon.
4. the vowel pair is at the end of the word and the first vowel in the pair is stressed in the original form of the word, e.g. ekonomiya (/ʔekonoˈmia/).

For vowel clusters with hard vowels like /a/, /e/ and /o/, there is no need to insert ⟨y⟩ or ⟨w⟩ between the vowels, e.g. aorta, paraon, baul. Variants are permitted, by the way, e.g. ideya is a variant of idea. That said, /au/, as a diphthong, is often transcribed as ⟨aw⟩, that words like haula (from jaula) are also written hawla, like in Rizal's original alphabet and orthography for Tagalog.

== Consonant clusters and digraphs ==
1. The pairs ⟨sk⟩ and ⟨st⟩: Words ending with the consonant clusters ⟨sk⟩ and ⟨st⟩ are permitted, unlike under the older abakada orthography where the second consonant is dropped, e.g. kontes (from English contest) can also be spelled kontest, and disk can be borrowed without respelling.
2. The consonant pair ⟨kt⟩: Tagalog words cannot end with the consonant cluster ⟨kt⟩, e.g. áspek (not *aspekt), korék (not *korekt), ádik (not *adikt)
3. Digraphs ⟨ch⟩ and ⟨sh⟩: The digraph ⟨ch⟩ (IPA: /t͡ʃ/), found in loanwords and some slang is generally transcribed into ⟨ts⟩, but is kept in Filipino loanwords from Ifugao (e. g. chaklag ‘tattooing on the chest’) and in the orthography of Kenachakran. There is still hesitancy to accept the digraph ⟨sh⟩, which can be kept or respelled according to Tagalog phonology, but the digraph is used in the orthography for Ibaloi, a Cordilleran language spoken in Benguet.

== E vs. I, and O vs. U ==
In native words, distinction of ⟨i⟩ and ⟨e⟩ or of ⟨u⟩ and ⟨o⟩ is irrelevant, and can change freely, but there are general rules regarding spelling words with those sounds.

- E and I
  - Interchanging ⟨e⟩ and ⟨i⟩ and vice versa are to be avoided in spelling.
  - ⟨e⟩ followed by an ⟨s⟩ indicates a Spanish loanword, and ⟨i⟩ followed by an ⟨s⟩ is used for English loanwords starting with ⟨s⟩ and another consonant, e.g. eskandalo is from escándalo, while iskandal is from scandal.
- O vs U
  - Interchanging ⟨o⟩ and ⟨u⟩, and vice versa are to be avoided as well.
  - ⟨o⟩ followed by ⟨n⟩ that becomes ⟨m⟩ before Spanish ⟨f⟩ and ⟨v⟩ can change to ⟨u⟩, e.g. kumperensiya (from conferencia), but not kumpleto (from completo) which should have been spelled as kompleto.
- ⟨e⟩ and ⟨o⟩ at the final syllable should not be changed to ⟨i⟩ and ⟨u⟩ respectively when the root word is followed by the enclitic -ng, or the root is reduplicated, except when intending to quote or imitate speech (e.g. taon-taon can be spelled taun-taon) or the new word has a significantly different meaning from its root (e.g. haluhalo vs halo-halo
- ⟨o⟩ becomes ⟨u⟩ and ⟨e⟩ becomes ⟨i⟩ when followed by a suffix, e.g. babae + ka- -an becomes kababaihan, biro + -in becomes biruin.
  - Exceptions: if the root is a loanword with a final /e/, the letter should be retained when suffixed, e.g. sine + -han should be sinehan, not *sinihan.
- The vowel pair ⟨oo⟩ should be kept even when followed by a suffix, e.g. noo, and the suffixed form is noohin. The same rule applies where the word ends with the vowel pair ⟨uo⟩.

== D/R allophony ==
In general, Tagalog ⟨d⟩ becomes ⟨r⟩ following vowels, e.g. dito becomes narito when the prefix na- is added, but not in nandito. This is done for ease of pronunciation.

- Daw vs. raw, and din vs rin: Daw is usually raw when followed by a vowel or a gliding consonant (w and y), so is din, which becomes rin. This rule, however, does not apply when the preceding word has a syllable starting with r.
- Exceptions: Some words starting with ⟨d⟩ are normally written without change when following an ⟨a⟩, e.g. dulas in madulas (though there is Marulas) and dilaw in madilaw (though there is Marilao). Sometimes, there are similar words that have different meanings when spelled with a ⟨d⟩ or an ⟨r⟩.

All those mentioned are just rough guidelines, but not formal spelling rules, so daw following a vowel is still accepted.

== Hyphens ==
Hyphens (gitling) have multiple uses in Tagalog spelling.

- Reduplications: Hyphens separate words in reduplications e.g. ano-ano, araw-araw
- Onomatopoeias: Hyphens are used to indicate onomatopoeic writing of each syllable, e.g. tik-tak
- Final consonant followed by initial vowel: Hyphens are inserted where a syllable ends with a consonant and is followed by another beginning with a vowel, e.g. pag-asa, agam-agam, mag-isa, pang-umento, brawn-awt
- Word boundaries
  - Hyphens separate the first syllable of a word formed from a proper noun, e.g pa-Mandaluyong, taga-Itogon, maka-Filipino
  - Hyphens also separate the first syllable of a word formed from a loanword kept in its original spelling, e.g. pa-cute, ipa-cremate
- Unusual pronunciations: Hyphens are also used to indicate stress on an unusual pronunciation of the first syllable, e.g. gáb-i.
- New compound words: Hyphens are used to separate the two words in all new compound words, e.g. lipat-bahay, bigyang-buhay.
- Time notation: Hyphens are used to separate ika- and alas- from numerals when writing times and dates. Only exception is ala-una, is always spelled, and should not be written as *ala-1
- Words prefixed with de-: Hyphens are used in words with the Spanish-derived prefix de-, e.g. de-lata, de-kolor, de-kalidad
- Words prefixed with di-: Hyphens are used in words prefixed with di (shortening of hindi) that has a meaning that are idiomatic or proverbial, is a common antonym of its root, or has jocular or derisive connotations.

== Abbreviations ==
Abbreviation of names and associated elements (titles, salutations, positions, ranks) are written with periods.

- Gng. (for Ginang)
- Hen. (for Heneral)
- J.P. Rizal (for Jose Protacio Rizal)
- Pang. (for Pangulo)

Initialisms are written without periods.

- BP (for batas pambansa)
- BRP (for Barko ng Republika ng Pilipinas)
- BSP (for Bangko Sentral ng Pilipinas)
- KSP (for kulang sa pansin)
- UP (for Unibersidad ng Pilipinas)

Abbreviations with more than three letters of all other words are also written with periods.

- atbp. (for at iba pa)
- Brgy. (for baranggay)
- blg. (for bilang)
- Ene. (for Enero)
- pam. (for pamahalaan)

== Capitalization ==
The following are capitalized in Tagalog:

- Proper nouns and derived terms
  - Personal names, except de, de la, dela, de los, delos in surnames (unless at the beginning of a sentence).
  - Names of God, deities, and religious figures (e.g. Diyos, Bathala, Hesus, Allah)
  - Names of organizations (e.g. Nagkakaisang Mga Bansa)
- Names of religions and religious texts (e.g. Kristiyanismo, Islam, Bibliya, Quran)
- Nationalities, ethnicities and races (except names of food, clothes, and the like derived from those) (e.g. Pilipino, Amerikano, Tagalog, Bisaya, Puti but not barong-tagalog, kamisa de tsino, papel de hapon)
- Names of historical events, holidays, and festivities (e.g. Ikalawang Digmaang Pandaigdig, Araw ng Kasarinlan, Pasko, Sinulog)
- Place names, except ng
- Names of academic concepts (e.g. ideologies, art styles or movements, especially where derived from a proper noun) and scientific ideas
- Names of days and months (e.g. Enero, Linggo)

== Evolution example ==
Below is an example of orthography between the early Spanish-style system orthography of Tagalog and the modern orthography of Filipino. The text used for comparison is the Filipino version of the Lord's Prayer. The phrase in square brackets is the doxology "for thine is the kingdom, and the power, and the glory forever".

Early Tagalog System (taken from Doctrina Christiana,)
Ama namin, nasa Lan͠gitca,
Ypasamba Mo ang N͠galanmo.
Mouisaamin ang pagcaharimo.
Ypasonor mo ang loob mo
Dito sa lupa para sa Lan͠git.
Bigya mo cami n͠gaion ng amin cacanin para nang sa arao-arao.
At patauarin Mo ang amin casalanã,
Yaiang uinaualan bahala namĩ sa loob
Ang casalanan nang nagcacasala sa amin.
Houag Mo caming æwan nang dicami matalo ng tocso,
Datapouat yadia mo cami sa dilan masama.
[Sapagcat iyo an caharian at capaniarihan
At caloualhatian, magpacailan man.]
Amen Jesús.

Modern Filipino orthography
Amá namin, sumasalangit Ka,
Sambahín ang Ngalan Mo.
Mapasaamin ang kaharián Mo.
Sundín ang loób Mo
Dito sa lupà, para nang sa langit.
Bigyán Mo kamí ngayón ng aming kakanin sa araw-araw.
At patawarin Mo kamí sa aming mga salà,
Para nang pagpápatawad namin
Sa mga nagkakasalà sa amin.
At huwág Mo kamíng ipahintulot sa tuksô,
At iadyâ Mo kamí sa lahát ng masamâ.
[Sapagkát sa Iyó ang kaharián, at ang kapangyarihan,
At ang kaluwálhatian, magpakailanmán.]
Amen Hesús.

== See also ==
- Comparison of orthographies of languages of the Philippines
- Dambana
- Filipino alphabet
- Filipino language
- Tagalog phonology
- Komisyon sa Wikang Filipino
