= Tagalog phonology =

This article deals with current phonology and phonetics and with historical developments of the phonology of the Tagalog language, including variants. The Filipino language is considered the national language and one of the two official languages of the Philippines; de facto, it is the modern standard form of Tagalog.

Tagalog has allophones, so it is important here to distinguish phonemes (written in slashes / /) and corresponding allophones (written in brackets [ ]).

== Consonants ==
Table of consonant phonemes of Tagalog
		Bilabial	Dental/ Alveolar	Postalveolar/ Palatal	Velar	Glottal
Nasal		m	n		ŋ	
Plosive	voiceless	p	t	(t͡ʃ)	k	ʔ
Plosive	voiced	b	d	(d͡ʒ)	ɡ	
Fricative			s	(ʃ)		h
Approximant			l	j	w	
Rhotic			ɾ			

Phoneme	Spelling	Distribution and quality of allophones
Stops
/p/	⟨p⟩ pulá ('red')	Unreleased or nasally released phrase-finally, eg. /haˌrap̚/ front.
/b/	⟨b⟩ bugháw ('blue')	Unreleased or nasally released phrase-finally.
/t/	⟨t⟩ tao ('human')	When followed by /j/, may be pronounced [tʃ], particularly by speakers in urban areas. Unreleased or nasally released phrase-finally, e.g. /ˌapat̚/ four.
/d/	⟨d⟩ diláw ('yellow')	When followed by /j/, may be pronounced [dʒ], particularly by speakers in urban areas. Unreleased or nasally released phrase-finally.
/k/	⟨k⟩ kamáy ('hand')	Post-velar [k̠] or otherwise relatively far back in the vocal tract for at least some speakers, even when adjacent to front vowels. Unreleased or nasally released phrase-finally, eg. /aˌnak̚/ child. Intervocalic /k/ tends to become lenited [x] or post-velar [k̠], as in bakit ('why') or takot ('fear').
/ɡ/	⟨g⟩ gulay ('vegetable')	Post-velar [g̠] or otherwise relatively far back in the vocal tract for at least some speakers, even when adjacent to front vowels. Unreleased or nasally released phrase-finally.
/ʔ/	⟨-⟩ mag-uwî ('to return home'). Normally unwritten at the end of a word (galà, 'roaming') or between vowels (Taal, a town in Batangas)	A glottal stop occurring at the end of a word is often elided when it is in the middle of a sentence, especially by speakers of the Manila Dialect. The preceding vowel then undergoes compensatory lengthening: /hinˈdiʔ + ba/ > /hinˈdiː + ba/ "isn't it?". It is preserved in some dialects of Tagalog. In the Palatuldikan (diacritical system), it is denoted by the pakupyâ or circumflex accent when the final syllable is stressed (e.g. dugô 'blood'), and by the paiwà (grave accent) if unstressed (susì 'key').
Fricatives
/s/	⟨s⟩ sangá ('branch')	When followed by /j/, it is often pronounced [ʃ], particularly by speakers in urban areas.
/ʃ/	⟨siy⟩ siyam ('nine') ⟨sy⟩ kondisyón ('condition') ⟨sh⟩ shabú ('methamphetamine')	May be pronounced [sj], especially by speakers in rural areas.
/h/	⟨h⟩ hawak ('being held')	Sometimes elided in rapid speech.
Affricates
/tʃ/	⟨tiy⟩ tiyan ('stomach') ⟨ty⟩ pangungutyâ ('ridicule') ⟨ts⟩ tsokolate ('chocolate');	May be pronounced [ts] (or [tj] if spelled ⟨ty⟩ or ⟨tiy⟩), especially by speakers in rural areas.
/dʒ/	⟨diy⟩ Diyos ('god') ⟨dy⟩, ⟨j⟩ dyaket, jaket ('jacket')	May be pronounced [dj], especially by speakers in rural areas.
Nasals
/m/	⟨m⟩ matá ('eye')	
/n/	⟨n⟩ nais ('desire')	In names borrowed from Spanish, it may assimilate to [m] before labial consonants (e.g. /m/ in San Miguel, /p/ in San Pedro, and /f/ in Infanta) and to [ŋ] before velar ones (e.g. /g/ and /k/) and, rarely, glottal /h/.
/ŋ/	⟨ng⟩ ngitî ('smile')	Assimilates to [m] before /b/ and /p/ (pampasiglâ, 'invigorator') and to [n] before /d t s l/ (pandiwà, 'verb'); some people pronounce /ŋɡ/ as a geminate consonant [ŋŋ], as in Angono.
Laterals
/l/	⟨l⟩ larawan ('picture')	Depending on the dialect, it may be dental/denti-alveolar or alveolar (light L) within or at the end of a word. It may also be velarized (dark L) if influenced by English phonology.
Rhotics
/ɾ/	⟨r⟩ saráp ('deliciousness'); kuryente ('electricity')	Traditionally an allophone of /d/, the /r/ phoneme may be now pronounced in free variation between the standard alveolar flapped [ɾ], a rolled [r], an approximant [ɹ] and more recently, the retroflex flap [ɽ].

The sounds [f], [v], [z] (spelled ⟨f⟩, ⟨v⟩, ⟨z⟩) are accepted in loanwords (e.g. fakulti, varayti, zoolohiya), but are nativized by some speakers to [p], [b], [s]. In older loanwords, nativization is reflected in writing, e.g. porma from Spanish forma.

== Vowels and semivowels ==
Table of vowel phonemes of Tagalog
	Front	Back
Close	i	u
Mid	ɛ	ɔ
Open	a	

Phoneme	Spelling	Allophones
Vowels
/a/	⟨a⟩ asoge ('mercury')	/a/ is raised slightly to [ɐ] in unstressed positions and also occasionally in stressed positions (e.g. Ináng Bayan [iˈnɐŋ ˈbɐjɐn], 'motherland'). The diphthong /aj/ and the sequence /aʔi/ have a tendency to become [eɪ] or [ɛː] (e.g. tenga from taínga, 'ear'; kelan from kailan, 'when'). The diphthong /au/ and the sequence /aʔu/ occasionally have a tendency to become [oʊ] or [ɔː] (e.g. isolì from isaulì, 'to return').
/ɛ/	⟨e⟩ in any position (espíritu, 'spirit'; tsinelas, 'slippers') and often ⟨i⟩ in final syllables (e.g., hindî) and with exceptions like mulî (adverbial form of 'again') and English loanwords.	/ɛ/ can be pronounced [i ~ ɪ ~ e ~ ɛ] or diphthongized to [ai].
/i/	⟨i⟩ ibon ('bird')	Unstressed /i/ is usually pronounced [ɪ] (e.g. sigalót, 'discord'). In final syllables, /i/ can be pronounced [ɪ ~ i ~ e ~ ɛ], as [e] and [ɛ] were formerly an allophone of /i/. /i/ before s-consonant clusters has a tendency to be dropped, as in isports [sports] ('sports') and istasyon [staˈʃon] ('station').
/ɔ/	⟨o⟩ oyayi ('lullaby')	/ɔ/ can be pronounced [u ~ ʊ ~ o ~ ɔ] or diphthongized to [au]. [oe ~ ʊɪ ~ ɔɛ] were also former allophones. Morphs into [u] before [mb] and [mp] (e.g. Bagumbayan, literally 'new town’, a place now part of Rizal Park; kumpisál, 'Confession').
/u/	⟨u⟩ utang ('debt')	Unstressed /u/ is usually pronounced [ʊ].
Semivowels and/or Semiconsonants
/j/	⟨y⟩ yugtô ('chapter')	
/w/	⟨w⟩ wakás ('end')	

The sounds [ə] (spelled ⟨ë⟩) is accepted by the Commission on the Filipino Language in loanwords from other Philippine languages such as angë́p 'fog' (from Ilocano) or language names such as wikang Mëranaw 'Maranao language'.

== Stress and final glottal stop ==
Stress is a distinctive feature in Tagalog. Primary stress occurs on either the final or the penultimate syllable of a word. Vowel lengthening accompanies primary or secondary stress except when stress occurs at the end of a word.

Tagalog words are often distinguished from one another by the position of the stress and/or the presence of a final glottal stop. In formal or academic settings, stress placement and the glottal stop are indicated by a diacritic (tuldík) above the final vowel. The penultimate primary stress position (malumay) is the default stress type and so is left unwritten except in dictionaries. The name of each stress type has its corresponding diacritic in the final vowel.

Phonetic comparison of Tagalog homographs based on stress and final glottal stop
Common spelling	Unstressed ultimate syllable no diacritic	Stressed ultimate syllable acute accent (´)	Unstressed ultimate syllable with glottal stop grave accent (`)	Stressed ultimate syllable with glottal stop circumflex accent (ˆ)
baba	[ˈbaːba] baba ('father')	[bɐˈba] babá ('piggy back')	[ˈbaːbaʔ] babà ('chin')	[bɐˈbaʔ] babâ ('descend [imperative]')
baka	[ˈbaːka] baka ('cow')	[bɐˈka] baká ('possible')		
bata	[ˈbaːta] bata ('bathrobe')	[bɐˈta] batá ('perseverance')	[ˈbaːtaʔ] batà ('child')	
bayaran	[bɐˈjaːɾan] bayaran ('pay [imperative]')	[bɐjɐˈɾan] bayarán ('for hire')		
kaya	[ˈka:ja] kaya ('can')			[kɐˈjaʔ] kayâ ('so')
labi			[ˈlaːbɛʔ]/[ˈlaːbiʔ] labì ('lips')	[lɐˈbɛʔ]/[lɐˈbiʔ] labî ('remains')
pito	[ˈpiːto] pito ('whistle')	[pɪˈto] pitó ('seven')		
sala	[ˈsaːla] sala ('fault')	[sɐˈla] salá ('interweaving [of bamboo slats]')	[ˈsaːlaʔ] salà ('filtering; sifting')	[sɐˈlaʔ] salâ ('broken [of bones]')

== See also ==
- Tagalog orthography
- Help:IPA/Tagalog
