= Voiced dental and alveolar plosives =

Consonantal sounds represented by ⟨d⟩ in IPA

Voiced alveolar plosive

d
- IPA number: 104

Audio sample
- source · help

Encoding
- Entity (decimal): &#100;
- Unicode (hex): U+0064
- X-SAMPA: d
- Braille: ⠙ (braille pattern dots-145)
Image

Voiced dental plosive

d̪
- IPA number: 104 408

Audio sample
- source · help

Encoding
- Entity (decimal): &#100;&#810;
- Unicode (hex): U+0064 U+032A
- X-SAMPA: d_d
- Braille: ⠙ (braille pattern dots-145) ⠠ (braille pattern dots-6) ⠹ (braille pattern dots-1456)
Image

Voiced postalveolar plosive

d̠

Audio sample
- source · help

Voiced alveolar and dental plosives (or stops) are a type of consonantal sound used in many spoken languages. The alveolar is familiar to English-speakers as the ⟨d⟩ sound in adore.

The symbol in the International Phonetic Alphabet that represents voiced dental, alveolar and postalveolar plosives is ⟨d⟩; the diacritic in ⟨d̪⟩ can be used to distinguish the dental.

There are only a few languages that distinguish dental and alveolar stops (or often more precisely laminal and apical alveolar stops), among them Kota, Toda, Venda and some Irish dialects.

== Features ==
Sagittal sections of voiced dental and alveolar plosives

Features of a voiced alveolar stop:

- Its manner of articulation is occlusive, which means it is produced by obstructing airflow in the vocal tract. Since the consonant is also oral, with no nasal outlet, it is a plosive.
- There are three specific variants of [d]:
  - Dental, which means it is articulated with either the tip or the blade of the tongue at the upper teeth, termed respectively apical and laminal.
  - Denti-alveolar, which means it is articulated with the blade of the tongue at the alveolar ridge, and the tip of the tongue behind upper teeth.
  - Alveolar, which means it is articulated with either the tip or the blade of the tongue at the alveolar ridge, termed respectively apical and laminal.
- Its phonation is voiced, which means the vocal cords vibrate during the articulation.
- It is an oral consonant, which means that air is not allowed to escape through the nose.
- It is a median consonant, which means it is produced by directing the airstream down the midline of the tongue, rather than to the sides.
- Its airstream mechanism is pulmonic, which means it is articulated by pushing air only with the intercostal muscles and abdominal muscles, as in most speech sounds.

== Occurrence ==
=== Dental or denti-alveolar ===
Language		Word	IPA	Meaning	Notes		
Albanian		derë	[dɛːɾ]	'door'			
Arabic	Egyptian	دنيا / donya	[ˈdonjæ]	'world'	See Egyptian Arabic phonology		
Armenian	Eastern	դեմք / demk'	[d̪ɛmkʰ]	'face'	Laminal denti-alveolar.		
Armenian	Western	տալ / dal	[d̪ɑl]	'to give'	Laminal denti-alveolar.		
Basque		diru	[d̪iɾu]	'money'	Laminal denti-alveolar.		
Belarusian		падарожжа/padarožža	[päd̪äˈroʐːä]	'travel'	Laminal denti-alveolar. See Belarusian phonology		
Bengali		দুধ/dūdh	[d̪ud̪ʱ]	'milk'	Laminal denti-alveolar. Contrasts aspirated and unaspirated forms. See Bengali phonology		
Catalan		drac	[ˈd̪ɾɑk]	'dragon'	Laminal denti-alveolar. See Catalan phonology		
Dinka		dhek	[d̪ek]	'distinct'	Laminal denti-alveolar. Contrasts with alveolar /d/.		
Dhivehi		ދެރަ/Dhera	[d̪eɾa]	'sad'	Laminal denti-alveolar.		
Dutch	Belgian	ding	[d̪ɪŋ]	'thing'	Laminal denti-alveolar.		
English	Dublin	then	[d̪ɛn]	'then'	Laminal denti-alveolar.	Corresponds to [ð] in other dialects. In Dublin it may be [d͡ð].	See English phonology
English	Southern Irish	then	[d̪ɛn]	'then'	Laminal denti-alveolar.	Corresponds to [ð] in other dialects. In Dublin it may be [d͡ð].	See English phonology
English	Geordie	then	[d̪ɛn]	'then'	Laminal denti-alveolar.	Word-initial allophone of /ð/; may be realized as [ð] instead.	See English phonology
English	Indian	then	[d̪ɛn]	'then'	Laminal denti-alveolar.		See English phonology
English	Ulster	dream	[d̪ɹim]	'dream'	Laminal denti-alveolar.	Allophone of /d/ before /r/, in free variation with an alveolar stop.	See English phonology
Esperanto		mondo	[ˈmondo]	'world'	See Esperanto phonology.		
French		dais	[d̪ɛ]	'canopy'	Laminal denti-alveolar. See French phonology		
Georgian		კუდი	[ˈkʼud̪i]	'tail'	Laminal denti-alveolar. See Georgian phonology		
Hindustani	Hindi	दूध / dūdh	[d̪uːd̪ʱ]	'milk'	Laminal denti-alveolar. Hindustani contrasts aspirated and unaspirated forms.	Contrasts with aspirated form <ध>.	See Hindi-Urdu phonology
Hindustani	Urdu	دودھ / dūdh	[d̪uːd̪ʱ]	'milk'	Laminal denti-alveolar. Hindustani contrasts aspirated and unaspirated forms.	Contrasts with aspirated form <دھ>.	See Hindi-Urdu phonology
Hungarian		adó	[ɒd̪oː]	'tax'	See Hungarian phonology		
Irish		dorcha	[ˈd̪ˠɔɾˠəxə]	'dark'	Laminal denti-alveolar. See Irish phonology		
Italian		dare	[ˈd̪äːre]	'to give'	Laminal denti-alveolar. See Italian phonology		
Japanese		男性的 / danseiteki	[d̪ä̃ɰ̃se̞ːt̪e̞kʲi]	'masculine'	Laminal denti-alveolar. See Japanese phonology		
Kashubian					Laminal denti-alveolar.		
Kazakh		дос	[d̪os̪]	'friend'	Laminal denti-alveolar.		
Kyrgyz		дос	[d̪os̪]	'friend'	Laminal denti-alveolar.		
Latvian		drudzis	[ˈd̪rud̪͡z̪is̪]	'fever'	Laminal denti-alveolar. See Latvian phonology		
Malayalam		ദിവസം/divasam	[d̪iʋɐsɐm]	'day'	See Malayalam phonology		
Marathi		दगड/dagaḍ	[d̪əɡəɖ]	'stone'	Laminal denti-alveolar. Marathi contrasts aspirated and unaspirated forms. See Marathi phonology		
Minangkabau	Padang	dakek	[d̪äke̞ʔ]	'near'	Laminal denti-alveolar.		
Nepali		दिन/din	[d̪in]	'daytime'	Contrasts with aspirated form. See Nepali Phonology		
Odia		ଦଶ/daśa	[d̪ɔsɔ]	'ten'	Laminal denti-alveolar. Contrasts aspirated and unaspirated forms.		
Pashto		ﺪﻮﻩ/dwa	[ˈd̪wɑ]	'two'	Laminal denti-alveolar.		
Polish		dom	[d̪ɔm]	'home'	Laminal denti-alveolar. See Polish phonology		
Portuguese	Many dialects	dar	[ˈd̪aɾ]	'to give'	Laminal denti-alveolar. May palatalize or lenite in certain environments, depending on dialect. See Portuguese phonology		
Punjabi	Gurmukhi	ਦਾਲ/dāl	[d̪ɑːl]	'lentils'	Laminal denti-alveolar.		
Punjabi	Shahmukhi	دال/dāl	[d̪ɑːl]	'lentils'	Laminal denti-alveolar.		
Russian		два/dva	[ˈd̪va]	'two'	Laminal denti-alveolar, contrasts with a palatalized alveolar variant. See Russian phonology		
Scottish Gaelic	Uist and Barra	leantail	[ˈʎɛnd̪al]	'following'	Allophone of [t̪] after nasals. See Scottish Gaelic phonology		
Serbo-Croatian		дуга / duga	[d̪ǔːgä]	'rainbow'	Laminal denti-alveolar. See Serbo-Croatian phonology		
Sinhala		දවස	[d̪aʋəsə]	'day'			
Slovene		danes	[ˈd̪àːnə́s̪]	'today'	Laminal denti-alveolar. See Slovene phonology		
Spanish		hundido	[ũn̪ˈd̪ið̞o̞]	'sunken'	Laminal denti-alveolar. See Spanish phonology		
Telugu		దయ	[d̪aja]	'Kindness'	Laminal denti-alveolar. Contrasts aspirated and unaspirated forms. Aspirated form articulated as breathy consonant.		
Turkish		dal	[d̪äɫ]	'twig'	Laminal denti-alveolar. See Turkish phonology		
Ukrainian		дерево/derevo	[ˈd̪ɛrɛβ̞ɔ]	'tree'	Laminal denti-alveolar. See Ukrainian phonology		
Uzbek		sifatida	[siɸætidæ]	'as'	Laminal denti-alveolar.		
Wu		唐/da	[d̪ɑ̃]	'the Tang dynasty'			
Zapotec	Tilquiapan	dan	[d̪aŋ]	'countryside'	Laminal denti-alveolar.		

=== Alveolar ===
Language		Word	IPA	Meaning	Notes
Adyghe		дахэ/daahė	[daːxa]	'pretty'	
Assyrian		ܘܪܕܐ werda	[wεrda]	'flower'	Predominant in the Urmia, Jilu, Baz, Gawar and Nochiya dialects. Corresponds to [ð̞] in other varieties.
Bengali		ডাব/ḍab	[dab]	'green coconut'	True alveolar in some eastern dialects. But all Bengali speakers allophone of /d/ after and before denti-alveolar or postalveolar /t̪, t̪ʰ, d̪, d̪ʱ, tʃ, tʃʰ, dʒ, dʒʱ, ʃ/. See Bengali phonology
Breton		distro	[distɾo]	'back'	
Catalan		susdit	[sʊzˈd̻it̪]	'said before'	Laminal alveolar. See Catalan phonology
Czech		do	[do]	'into'	See Czech phonology
Dutch		dak	[dɑk]	'roof'	See Dutch phonology
English	Most speakers	dash	[ˈdæʃ]	'dash'	See English phonology
Finnish		sidos	[ˈsido̞s]	'bond'	See Finnish phonology
Greek		ντροπή / dropí	[dro̞ˈpi]	'shame'	See Modern Greek phonology
Hebrew		דואר/ do'ar	[ˈdo̞.äʁ̞]	'mail'	See Modern Hebrew phonology
Hmong	White Hmong	𖬈𖬲𖬞𖬰 / dej	[de˥˨]	'water'	In Green Hmong, it'll be 𖬈𖬲𖬭𖬰 / dlej [dle˥˨]
Hungarian		holdra	[ˈholdra]	'onto the moon'	Allophone of [d̪] before [r] or [ɾ]. See Hungarian phonology
Kabardian		дахэ/ daahė	[daːxa]	'pretty'	
Khmer		ដប / dab	[dɑp]	'bottle'	
Korean		아들 / adeul	[ɐdɯl]	'son'	See Korean phonology
Kurdish	Northern	diran	[dɪɾä:n]	'tooth'	See Kurdish phonology
Kurdish	Central	ددان/ dadân	[dædä:n]	'tooth'	See Kurdish phonology
Kurdish	Southern	دیان/dîân	[diːä:n]	'tooth'	See Kurdish phonology
Luxembourgish		brudder	[ˈpʀudɐ]	'brother'	More often voiceless [t]. See Luxembourgish phonology
Malay	Standard (incl. Malaysian)	dahan	[dähän]	'branch'	See Malay phonology
Malay	Indonesian	dahan		'branch'	See Malay phonology
Malay	Kelantan-Pattani	dahan	[dahɛː]	'branch'	See Kelantan-Pattani Malay
Malayalam		എന്റെ/ente	[ende]	'my' or 'mine'	See Malayalam phonology
Maltese		dehen	[den]	'wit'	
Tagalog		dalaga	[dɐˈlaɰɐ]	'maiden'	See Tagalog phonology
Thai		ดาว/ dāw	[daːw]	'star'	
Welsh		diafol	[djavɔl]	'devil'	See Welsh phonology
West Frisian		doarp	[ˈdwɑrp]	'village'	
Yi		ꄿ/dda	[da˧]	'competent'	
Yonaguni		与那国 / dunan	[dunaŋ]	'Yonaguni'	

=== Postalveolar ===
To distinguish from the voiced dental and alveolar plosives, a voiced postalveolar plosive can be transcribed as ⟨d̠⟩. A more explicit (though convoluted) transcription ⟨d͇˗⟩, using a combination of extIPA and obsolete diacritics, can also be used.

Language	Word	IPA	Meaning	Notes
Bengali	ডাকাত	[d̠akat̪]	'robber'	Apical postalveolar; contrasts aspirated forms. See Bengali phonology
Hindustani	डालना/ڈالنا	[d̠aːlnaː]	'to put'	Contrasts unaspirated and aspirated forms. See Hindustani phonology
Nepali	डर	[d̠ʌr]	'fear'	See Nepali phonology
Odia	ଡଙ୍ଗା/ḍaṅgā	[d̠ɔŋga]	'boat'	Contrasts unaspirated and aspirated forms.

=== Variable ===
Language		Word	IPA	Meaning	Notes
Arabic		دين/dīn	[diːn]	'religion'	Laminal denti-alveolar or alveolar, depending on the dialect. See Arabic phonology.
English	Broad South African	dawn	[doːn]	'dawn'	Laminal denti-alveolar for some speakers, alveolar for other speakers.
English	Scottish	dawn	[dɔn]	'dawn'	Laminal denti-alveolar for some speakers, alveolar for other speakers.
English	Welsh	dawn	[dɒːn]	'dawn'	Laminal denti-alveolar for some speakers, alveolar for other speakers.
German	Standard	oder	[ˈoːdɐ]	'or'	Varies between laminal denti-alveolar, laminal alveolar and apical alveolar. See Standard German phonology
Norwegian	Urban East	dans	[d̻ɑns]	'dance'	Partially voiced or fully voiceless [t]. Varies between laminal denti-alveolar and laminal alveolar. See Norwegian phonology
Persian		اداره/edâre	[ʔe.d̪ɑː'ɾe]	'office'	Varies between laminal denti-alveolar and apical alveolar. See Persian phonology
Slovak		do	[d̻ɔ̝]	'into'	Varies between laminal denti-alveolar and laminal alveolar. See Slovak phonology
Swedish	Central Standard	dag	[dɑːɡ]	'day'	Varies between laminal denti-alveolar and alveolar, with the former being predominant. May be an approximant in casual speech. See Swedish phonology

== See also ==
- Index of phonetics articles

== Notes ==
Place →	Labial					Coronal										Dorsal					Laryngeal			
Manner ↓	Bilabial		Labiodental		Linguolabial		Dental		Alveolar		Postalveolar		Retroflex		(Alveolo-)palatal		Velar		Uvular		Pharyngeal/epiglottal		Glottal	
Nasal	m̥	m	ɱ̊	ɱ		n̼	n̪̊	n̪	n̥	n	n̠̊	n̠	ɳ̊	ɳ	ɲ̊	ɲ	ŋ̊	ŋ	ɴ̥	ɴ				
Plosive	p	b	p̪	b̪	t̼	d̼	t̪	d̪	t	d			ʈ	ɖ	c	ɟ	k	ɡ	q	ɢ	ʡ		ʔ	
Sibilant affricate							t̪s̪	d̪z̪	ts	dz	t̠ʃ	d̠ʒ	tʂ	dʐ	tɕ	dʑ								
Non-sibilant affricate	pɸ	bβ	p̪f	b̪v			t̪θ	d̪ð	tɹ̝̊	dɹ̝	t̠ɹ̠̊˔	d̠ɹ̠˔			cç	ɟʝ	kx	ɡɣ	qχ	ɢʁ	ʡʜ	ʡʢ	ʔh	
Sibilant fricative							s̪	z̪	s	z	ʃ	ʒ	ʂ	ʐ	ɕ	ʑ								
Non-sibilant fricative	ɸ	β	f	v	θ̼	ð̼	θ	ð	θ̠	ð̠	ɹ̠̊˔	ɹ̠˔	ɻ̊˔	ɻ˔	ç	ʝ	x	ɣ	χ	ʁ	ħ	ʕ	h	ɦ
Approximant		β̞		ʋ				ð̞		ɹ		ɹ̠		ɻ		j		ɰ						˷
Tap/flap		ⱱ̟		ⱱ					ɾ̥	ɾ			ɽ̊	ɽ						ɢ̆		ʡ̆		
Trill	ʙ̥	ʙ							r̥	r		r̠	ɽ̊r̥	ɽr					ʀ̥	ʀ	ʜ	ʢ		
Lateral affricate									tɬ	dɮ			tꞎ	d𝼅	c𝼆	ɟʎ̝	k𝼄	ɡʟ̝						
Lateral fricative							ɬ̪		ɬ	ɮ			ꞎ	𝼅	𝼆	ʎ̝	𝼄	ʟ̝						
Lateral approximant								l̪	l̥	l		l̠	ɭ̊	ɭ	ʎ̥	ʎ	ʟ̥	ʟ		ʟ̠				
Lateral tap/flap									ɺ̥	ɺ			𝼈̊	𝼈		ʎ̆		ʟ̆						

		BL	LD	D	A	PA	RF	P	V	U
Implosive	Voiced	ɓ			ɗ		ᶑ	ʄ	ɠ	ʛ
Implosive	Voiceless	ɓ̥			ɗ̥		ᶑ̊	ʄ̊	ɠ̊	ʛ̥
Ejective	Stop	pʼ			tʼ		ʈʼ	cʼ	kʼ	qʼ
Ejective	Affricate		p̪fʼ	tθʼ	tsʼ	tʃʼ	tʂʼ	tɕʼ	kxʼ	qχʼ
Ejective	Fricative	ɸʼ	fʼ	θʼ	sʼ	ʃʼ	ʂʼ	ɕʼ	xʼ	χʼ
Ejective	Lateral affricate				tɬʼ			c𝼆ʼ	k𝼄ʼ	q𝼄ʼ
Ejective	Lateral fricative				ɬʼ					
Click (top: velar; bottom: uvular)	Tenuis	kʘ qʘ		kǀ qǀ	kǃ qǃ		k𝼊 q𝼊	kǂ qǂ		
Click (top: velar; bottom: uvular)	Voiced	ɡʘ ɢʘ		ɡǀ ɢǀ	ɡǃ ɢǃ		ɡ𝼊 ɢ𝼊	ɡǂ ɢǂ		
Click (top: velar; bottom: uvular)	Nasal	ŋʘ ɴʘ		ŋǀ ɴǀ	ŋǃ ɴǃ		ŋ𝼊 ɴ𝼊	ŋǂ ɴǂ	ʞ	
Click (top: velar; bottom: uvular)	Tenuis lateral				kǁ qǁ					
Click (top: velar; bottom: uvular)	Voiced lateral				ɡǁ ɢǁ					
Click (top: velar; bottom: uvular)	Nasal lateral				ŋǁ ɴǁ					
