= Abakada alphabet =

National alphabet of the Tagalog language (1940–87)

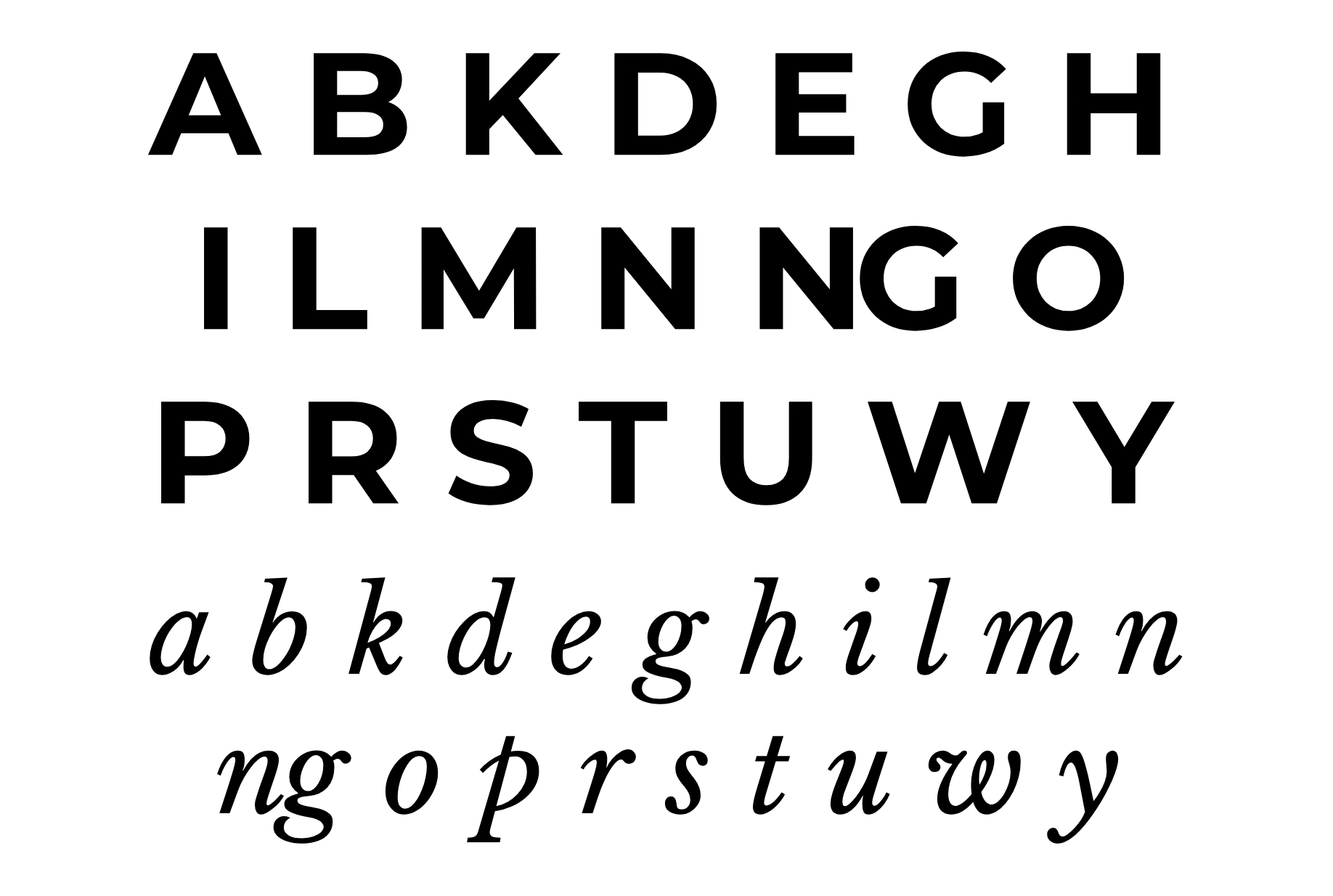
The Abakada alphabet.

The Abakada alphabet is an "indigenized" Latin alphabet that gradually became associated with the Tagalog language during the early 20th century and has become part of the Tagalog-based national language of the Philippines now called Filipino.

The alphabet, which contains 20 letters, was introduced in the grammar book developed by Lope K. Santos for the newly designated national language based on Tagalog. It was officially adopted by the then Institute of National Language (Filipino: Surian ng Wikang Pambansa) and the National Commission on Culture and the Arts (Filipino: Pambasang Komission Para sa Kultura at mga Pambasa).

The alphabet has since been superseded by the adoption of the Filipino alphabet (with an additional eight letters and repositioning of the letter K) in 1987.

== Letters ==
The collation of letters in the Abakada alphabet closely follows that of other Latin alphabets, besides the digraph Ng being inserted after N and the placement of K

When enumerating each consonant, it is always pronounced with an ⟨-a⟩ suffix (i.e., "ba", "ka", etc.). This is also the basis for the alphabet's nomenclature.

Majuscule forms (also called uppercase or capital letters)
A	B	K	D	E	G	H	I	L	M	N	NG	O	P	R	S	T	U	W	Y
Minuscule forms (also called lowercase or small letters)
a	b	k	d	e	g	h	i	l	m	n	ng	o	p	r	s	t	u	w	y

== History ==
During the pre-Hispanic era, Old Tagalog was written using the Kawi or the Baybayin script. For three centuries Tagalog was written following, to some extent, the Spanish phonetic and orthographic rules.

Dr. José Rizal was one of several proponents (including Trinidad Pardo de Tavera) of reforming the orthographies of the various Philippine languages in the late 19th-century. Like other proponents, he suggested to "indigenize" the alphabet of the Philippine languages by replacing the letters C and Q with K. Initially, these reforms were not broadly adopted when they were proposed but gradually became popular into the early 20th century.

Following the establishment of the Philippine Commonwealth in 1935, the government selected Tagalog as basis for a "national language" (i.e. Filipino). Following this, the development of a dictionary and grammar book for this "national language" started. In 1939, Lope K. Santos developed the Ang Balarila ng Wikang Pambansa (The Grammar of the National Language) which, apart from containing grammar rules, contained the 20-letter alphabet designated as Abakada.

The Abakada was replaced in 1971 with an expanded alphabet containing an additional 11 letters (C, CH, F, J, LL, Ñ, Q, RR, V, X, and Z) which was in turn replaced with the current 28-letter modern alphabet. At present, all languages of the Philippines may be written using the modern Filipino alphabet (officially adopted in 1987), which includes all the letters of the Abakada.

== See also ==
- Filipino alphabet
- Filipino orthography
- Dambana
- Baybayin
- Kawi script
- Philippine Braille
