= Filipino alphabet =

Letters and digraphs in Filipino and other Philippine languages

Filipino alphabet Alpabetong Filipino Alpabeto nga Filipino Alpabeto a Filipino Alpabeto na Filipino
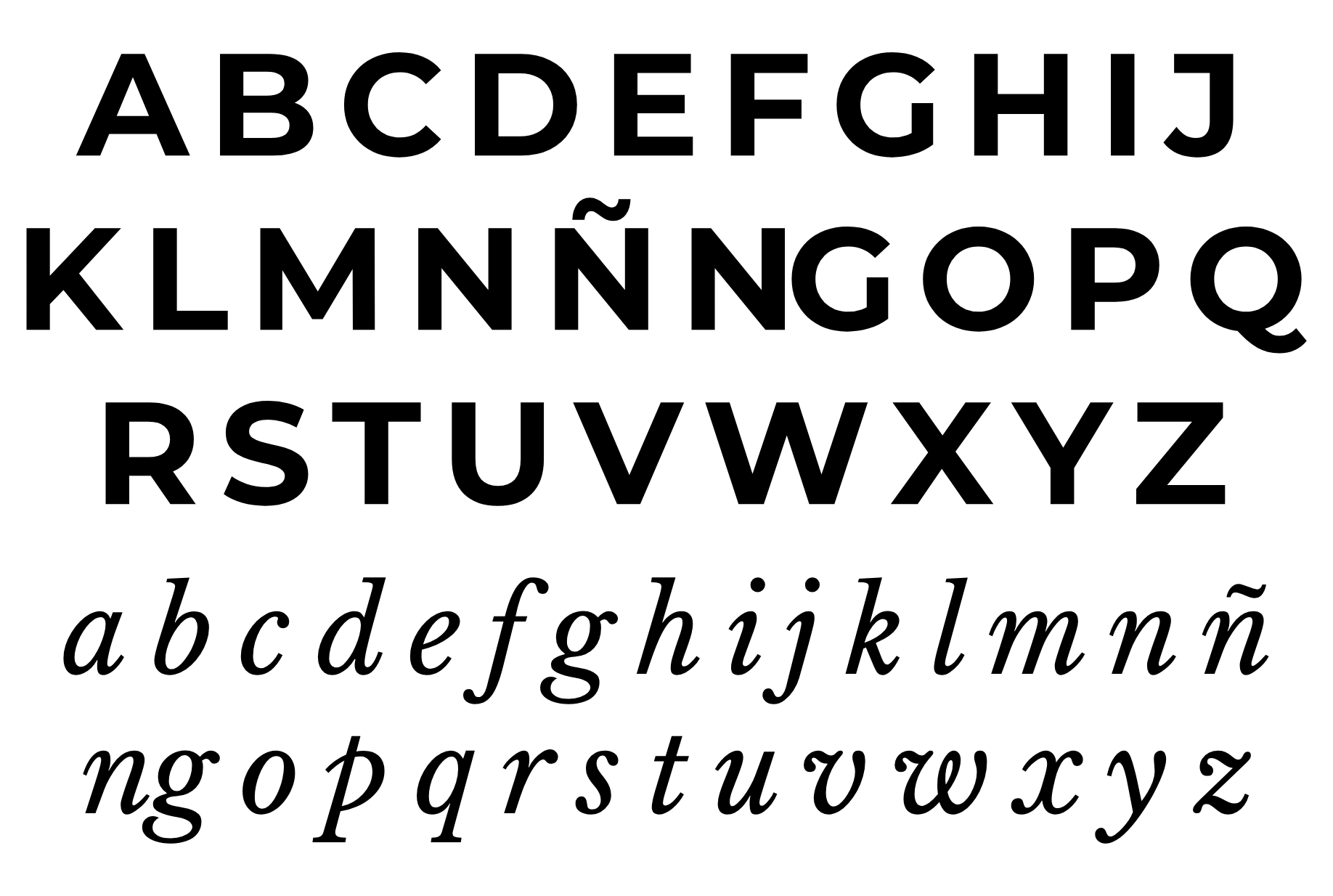
- Script type: Alphabet
- Period: 1987–present
- Direction: Left-to-right
- Official script: Philippines
- Languages: Filipino, all other Philippine languages

Related scripts
- Parent systems: (Proto-writing): Egyptian hieroglyphs; Proto-Sinaitic alphabet; Phoenician alphabet; Greek alphabet; Old Italic scripts; Latin alphabet; English alphabet (partly Spanish alphabet); Filipino alphabet

ISO 15924
- ISO 15924: Latn (215), Latin

Unicode
- Unicode alias: Latin
- Unicode range: Basic Latin U+0041–U+005A; U+0061–U+007A; Latin-1 Supplement U+00C4; U+00CB; U+00D1; U+00F1; Combining Diacritical Marks U+0300–U+0304; U+0307–U+0308; U+0313; U+0361; Latin Extended Additional U+1E1E

The Filipino alphabet (Filipino: Alpabetong Filipino, formerly Alfabetong Filipino (Note: This was the standard spelling in Filipino between the issuances of Department of Education (DepEd) Memorandum No. 45, s. 2001 (dated August 17, 2001) and DepEd Memorandum No. 42, s. 2006 (dated October 9, 2006).)) is the official alphabet of Filipino, the national language of the Philippines, and the de facto alphabet of all other Philippine languages. The standard Filipino alphabet is made up of 28 letters, comprising the entire letter set of the ISO basic Latin alphabet, the Spanish letter Ñ, and the nativized digraph NG. The digraph was retained from the 31-letter "enriched" Filipino alphabet (Filipino: Pinagyamang Alpabetong Filipino), which was adopted from the 20-letter Abakada alphabet (Filipino: Abakada), in turn adapted from the digraph N͠G under the 32-letter modified Spanish alphabet (Filipino: Abesedaryo).

Majuscule form
A	B	C	D	E	F	G	H	I	J	K	L	M	N	Ñ	NG	O	P	Q	R	S	T	U	V	W	X	Y	Z
Minuscule form
a	b	c	d	e	f	g	h	i	j	k	l	m	n	ñ	ng	o	p	q	r	s	t	u	v	w	x	y	z

In 2013, the Commission on the Filipino Language (Filipino: Komisyon sa Wikang Filipino) published Ortograpiyang Pambansa ("National Orthography"), a new set of guidelines that resolved long-standing issues in phonemic representation across Philippine languages. This was supplemented in 2014 by KWF Manwal sa Masinop na Pagsulat ("KWF Handbook on Proper Writing"), which provided a broader scope of typographic, stylistic, and formatting guidelines not previously covered. Together, these laid the groundwork for the Commission's Harmonization of Orthographies of Filipino Languages (Filipino: Armonisasyon ng Ortograpiya ng mga Wika ng Pilipinas) initiative, with the standard Filipino alphabet as part of the "universal model" for all existing and upcoming state-sanctioned orthographies. Since regional and local orthographies may adapt national guidelines to represent phonemes absent in Tagalog, on which Filipino is originally based, this has led to the introduction of new graphemes and diacritics in Filipino as well as the reintroduction of historical Spanish-based letters and digraphs.

== Graphemes ==
=== Standard Filipino alphabet ===
Each grapheme in the Alpabeto is called a títik, most of which represent a distinctive sound. They are classified as a patínig (vowel) or a katínig (consonant). The letters W and Y may be classified as a malápatínig (semivowel). The letters are alphabetized and pronounced in the same way as in English, save for the létra (letter) Ñ and digrápo (digraph) NG.

Letter/ Digraph	Name	Phoneme	Notes
A	ey	/a/	Becomes [ɐ] in unstressed syllables and [ä] in stressed syllables.
B	bi	/b/	
C	si	/k/, /s/	For unassimilated words in Spanish and English, ⟨ca, co, cu⟩ generally represent /k/, while ⟨ce, ci⟩ generally represent /s/. Also used in Philippine languages where /tʃ/ is orthographically preserved as ⟨ch⟩. Historically, words now written with ⟨ka, ko, ku⟩ were written with ⟨ca, co, cu⟩ under the Abesedaryo.
D	di	/d/	In Tagalog, often allophonic with /ɾ/ in intervocalic position, which is usually reflected in spelling (e.g., dami "amount" vs. marami "many"). However, not all words follow this convention (e.g., dali "ease" vs. madali "easy"), and some have diverged to carry distinct meanings (e.g., madamdamin "passionate" vs. maramdamin "sensitive").
E	i	/e/, /ə/	Normally [e ~ e̞], but can become [ɛ] in emphatic speech. Also normally /ə/ in words from Philippine languages where it occurs, as the dedicated letter Ë was only introduced in 2013.
F	ef	/f/	Often indistinguishable from [p]. Generally used for proper names (e.g., Felix, Ifugao) and words of English origin (e.g., fakulti "teaching staff"). Also used in Filipino words of Tëduray origin (e.g., faga "meteorite") and in Philippine languages where /f/ occurs.
G	ji (Note: The spellings "eych", "ji", "jey", and "enji" have been used by the Komisyon sa Wikang Filipino since at least its August 2007 draft of Ortograpiyang Pambansa, as well as in Giya sa Ortograpiyang Bikol (2012), predating KWF Manwal sa Masinop na Pagsulat (2014) and later orthographies of many Philippine languages.), dyi, diyí (Note: This is the standard spelling in Filipino under a strict application of Section 5.2 of KWF Manwal sa Masinop na Pagsulat (2014).)	/ɡ/, /dʒ/, /h/, /ɰ/	For unassimilated foreign words, ⟨ga, go, gu⟩ generally represent /g/ in English and Spanish, while ⟨ge, gi⟩ generally represent /dʒ/ in English and /h/ in Spanish. Also normally /ɰ/ in Philippine languages where it occurs, such as Boînën (e.g., sugud (Note: Common spelling: sugud Preferred spelling: sexed Standard spelling: sëg̓ëd) "spouse"), as the dedicated letter G̓ was only introduced in 2023. Historically, words now written with ⟨ge, gi⟩ were written with ⟨gue, gui⟩ under the Abesedaryo.
H	eych, eyts	/h/	Sometimes pronounced [e̞tʃ].
I	ay	/i/	Becomes [ɪ] in unstressed syllables and [i] in stressed syllables.
J	jey, dyey, diyéy	/dʒ/, /h/	Sometimes indistinguishable from [ds] or [s]. Usually respelled with ⟨dy, diy⟩ to represent [dʒ] or [ʒ], or with ⟨h⟩ to represent [h] or [x]. For unassimilated foreign words, ⟨j⟩ generally represents [dʒ] and [ʒ] in English, and [h] and [x] in Spanish. Also used in Filipino words of Bahasa Sug origin (e.g., julup "imbecile") and in Philippine languages where /dʒ/ occurs.
K	key	/k/	Not to be confused with [kʰ]. Always unaspirated in clear speech and often unreleased in coda (e.g., /aˈnak̚/ "child"). [kʷ] only with ⟨kw, kuw⟩ (e.g., bakwit "evacuee", kuwintas "necklace").
L	el	/l/	Also used in Philippine languages where /ʎ/ is orthographically preserved as ⟨ll⟩.
M	em	/m/	
N	en	/n/	[n.j ~ ɲ] only with ⟨ny, niy⟩ (e.g., pinya "pineapple", kaniya "his/her[s]/its").
Ñ	énye	/ɲ/	Usually respelled with ⟨ny, niy⟩. Generally used for proper names (e.g., Niño, Malacañang) and recent words of Spanish origin (e.g., ñu "wildebeest"). Also used in Ivatan (e.g., iñinen "to lament"), Ichbayaten (e.g., hañin "typhoon"), and other Philippine languages where /ɲ/ occurs.
NG	énji, éndyi, éndiyí	/ŋ/	Comparable to ⟨ng⟩ in English along and singer. Not to be confused with the indirect case marker ng pronounced [nɐŋ]. [ŋg] only in words of Spanish origin containing ⟨ngl, ngr⟩ (e.g., Ingles "English", kongreso "congress").
O	o, ow	/o/	Normally [o ~ o̞], but can become [ɔ] in emphatic speech.
P	pi	/p/	Not to be confused with [pʰ]. Always unaspirated in clear speech and often unreleased in coda (e.g., /haˈrap̚/ "front"). [pʷ] only with ⟨pw, puw⟩ (e.g., datapwat "nevertheless", kapuwa "fellow").
Q	kyu, kiyú	/kʷ/, /k/	Usually respelled with ⟨kw, kuw, k⟩. Generally used for proper names (e.g., Tariq, Siquijor) and words of English (e.g., quits), Spanish (e.g., quedan "warehouse receipt"), and Arabic origins (e.g., talaq "husband-initiated divorce"). Also used for Filipino words of ultimate Latin origin (e.g., quorum) and in Philippine languages where ⟨q⟩ is orthographically preserved. Historically, words now written with ⟨ke, ki⟩ were written with ⟨que, qui⟩ under the Abesedaryo.
R	ar	/ɾ/	Normally [ɾ], but can become [r ~ ɹ] within consonant clusters. Also used in Philippine languages where /r/ is orthographically preserved as ⟨rr⟩.
S	es	/s/	
T	ti	/t/	Not to be confused with [tʰ]. Always unaspirated in clear speech and often unreleased in coda (e.g., /ˈapat̚/ "four"). [tʷ] only with ⟨tw, tuw⟩ (e.g., estatwa "statue", tuwina "at all times") and in a few exceptions (e.g., bituin "star").
U	yu	/u/, /ə/	Becomes [ʊ] in unstressed syllables and [u] in stressed syllables. Also normally /ə/ in words from Philippine languages where it occurs, as the dedicated letter Ë was only introduced in 2013.
V	vi	/v/	Often indistinguishable from [b]. Generally used for proper names (e.g., Valdez, Davao) and words of English origin (e.g., varayti "variety"). Also used in Filipino words of Chabacano origin (e.g., vinta "outrigger boat") and in Philippine languages where /v/ occurs.
W	dóbolyú	/w/	
X	eks	/ks/, /s/, /h/, /z/, /ɰ/, /ɣ/	Usually respelled with ⟨eks, ks, s, h, z⟩. Generally used for proper names (e.g., Roxas, Mexico) and words of English origin (e.g., xerox "photocopy"). Also used in Filipino words of Isnëg origin (e.g., xaddan "malaria-related myalgia"). Also normally /ɰ/ or /ɣ/ in words from Philippine languages where they occur, such as Boînën (e.g., axag (Note: Common spelling: agag Preferred spelling: axag Standard spelling: ag̓ag) "to appropriate") and Ichbayaten (e.g., maxnep "high tide"), as the dedicated letter G̓ was only introduced in 2023.
Y	way	/j/, /i/	Generally /i/ for proper names (e.g., Syquia, Famy) and words of English origin (e.g., party-list "proportional representation system for under-represented sectors"). For common nouns, /i/ only with the conjunction y ("and") within phrases of Spanish origin (e.g., ala-una y medya "one-thirty"). Historically, words now written beginning with ⟨i⟩ were written beginning with ⟨y⟩ under the Abesedaryo, as evident in surnames (e.g., Ybañez, Ybarra) and archaic place names (e.g., Yligan, Ylocos) and plant names (e.g., ylang-ylang (Note: The standard spelling in Filipino is "ilang-ilang".), ypil).
Z	zi	/z/	Often indistinguishable from [s]. Generally used for proper names (e.g., Mendoza, Zamboanga) and words of English origin (e.g., zigzag). Also used in Filipino words of Ibanag origin (e.g., ziga "hardship") and in Philippine languages where /z/ occurs, such as Porohanon (e.g., kazu "fire"). Sometimes pronounced [zeɪ̯].

=== Additional, official graphemes for other Philippine languages ===
Letter/ Digraph	Name	Phoneme	Language (Dialect)	Notes	Ref.
Ä	ey patuldók	/ɜ/	Menuvu (Mänuvu Pulangiyän)		
B̓	bi kuwít-taás, bi pasingáw		G̓insëlug̓ën Sub̓anën		
CH	síeych, síeyts	/tʃ/	Chavacano languages, Ichbayaten, Ifugaw, Ivatan, Kalingga, Kenachakran		
Ë	i patuldók	/ə/, /ɨ/	Abëllën, Agutaynën, Alta, Boînën, G̓insëlug̓ën Sub̓anën, Hinigaunon, Ibaloy, Isnëg, Itnëg, Kagayanën, Kaluyanën, Kankanaëy, Mëgindënëwn, Mënubu Dulangan, Mënuvu Ërumanën, Mënuvu Ubo, Mëranaw, Sangirë, Tëduray, Tinagbanwa		
Ḟ	ef tuldók-taás		Liniyas		
FY	éfway		Kenachakran		
G̓	ji kuwít-taás, ji pasingáw	/ɣ ~ h/, /ɰ/	Boînën, G̓insëlug̓ën Sub̓anën, Tinagbanwa		
K̇	key tuldók-taás		Liniyas		
LL	élye	/l.j ~ ʎ/	Ilokano		
S̃	es tílde, es pabakúlod	/s ~ tʃ/	Tinagbanwa		
T̃	ti tílde, ti pabakúlod	/t ~ tʃ/	Tinagbanwa		
W̓	dóbolyú kuwít-taás, dóbolyú pasingáw	/β ~ w/	Tinagbanwa		

=== Official, non-alphabetized digraphs for other Philippine languages ===
Digraph	Name	Phoneme	Language (Dialect)	Notes	Ref.
KH	kéy-eych, kéy-eyts	/kʰ/	Mëranaw		
SH	és-eych, és-eyts	/ʃ/	Ibaloy		
TH	tíeych, tíeyts	/tʰ/	Mëranaw		
TS	tíes	/tʃ/	Bikol languages, Hiligaynon, Ifugaw, Ilokano, Ivatan, Sinugboanon, Tagalog, Waray		

== Diacritics ==
The diacritics used alongside the Alpabeto are the acute accent ⟨◌́⟩ (tuldík pahilís), the grave accent ⟨◌̀⟩ (tuldík paiwà), the circumflex ⟨◌̂⟩ (tuldík pakupyâ), the tilde ⟨◌̃⟩ (tuldík tílde or tuldík pabakúlod), the umlaut ⟨◌̈⟩ (tuldík patuldók), the macron ⟨◌̄⟩ (tuldík pahabâ), the above-dot ⟨◌̇⟩ (tuldík tuldók-taás), the above-comma ⟨◌̓⟩ (tuldík kuwít-taás or tuldík pasingáw), and the inverted double-breve ⟨◌͡◌⟩ (tuldík árko). The acute and grave accents tend to be optional pronunciation guides, with the latter placed exclusively on word-final vowels. The circumflex is also optional on word-final vowels, but is required when placed on word-initial or word-medial vowels. The tilde, above-dot, and above-comma are placed exclusively on consonants, while the umlaut, macron, and inverted double-breve are placed exclusively on vowels; the latter is the only diacritic that spans two adjacent vowels, which indicates the absence of an intervocalic glottal stop /ʔ/.

In many Philippine languages, certain letter-diacritic combinations are treated as letters in their own right.

The following table lists all possible combinations of vowels and vocalic diacritics, with the letter X representing a penultimate syllable. As of 2024, not all of these combinations have been attested in Filipino or other Philippine languages with state-sanctioned orthographies. However, the Komisyon sa Wikang Filipino is currently leading the efforts to standardize the orthographies of all Philippine languages under a "harmonized" Filipino alphabet:

Acute accent (◌́)	á /ˈa/	ā́ /ˈaː/	é /ˈe/	ḗ /ˈeː/	ë́ /ˈə/	ë̄́ /ˈəː/	í /ˈi/	ī́ /ˈiː/	ó /ˈo/	ṓ /ˈoː/	ú /ˈu/	ū́ /ˈuː/
Grave accent (◌̀)	à /ˈX.aʔ/	ā̀ /ˈX.aːʔ/	è /ˈX.eʔ/	ḕ /ˈX.eːʔ/	ë̀ /ˈX.əʔ/	ë̄̀ /ˈX.əːʔ/	ì /ˈX.iʔ/	ī̀ /ˈX.iːʔ/	ò /ˈX.oʔ/	ṑ /ˈX.oːʔ/	ù /ˈX.uʔ/	ū̀ /ˈX.uːʔ/
Circumflex (◌̂)	â /ˈaʔ/	ā̂ /ˈaːʔ/	ê /ˈeʔ/	ē̂ /ˈeːʔ/	ë̂ /ˈəʔ/	ë̄̂ /ˈəːʔ/	î /ˈiʔ/	ī̂ /ˈiːʔ/	ô /ˈoʔ/	ō̂ /ˈoːʔ/	û /ˈuʔ/	ū̂ /ˈuːʔ/
Inverted double-breve (◌͡◌)	a͡a a͡e a͡ë a͡i a͡o a͡u	a͡â a͡ê a͡ë̂ a͡î a͡ô a͡û	e͡a e͡e e͡ë e͡i e͡o e͡u	e͡â e͡ê e͡ë̂ e͡î e͡ô e͡û	ë͡a ë͡e ë͡ë ë͡i ë͡o ë͡u	ë͡â ë͡ê ë͡ë̂ ë͡î ë͡ô ë͡û	i͡a i͡e i͡ë i͡i i͡o i͡u	i͡â i͡ê i͡ë̂ i͡î i͡ô i͡û	o͡a o͡e o͡ë o͡i o͡o o͡u	o͡â o͡ê o͡ë̂ o͡î o͡ô o͡û	u͡a u͡e u͡ë u͡i u͡o u͡u	u͡â u͡ê u͡ë̂ u͡î u͡ô u͡û

The standardized combinations of consonants and consonantal diacritics can be found in the Character encoding section.

== History ==
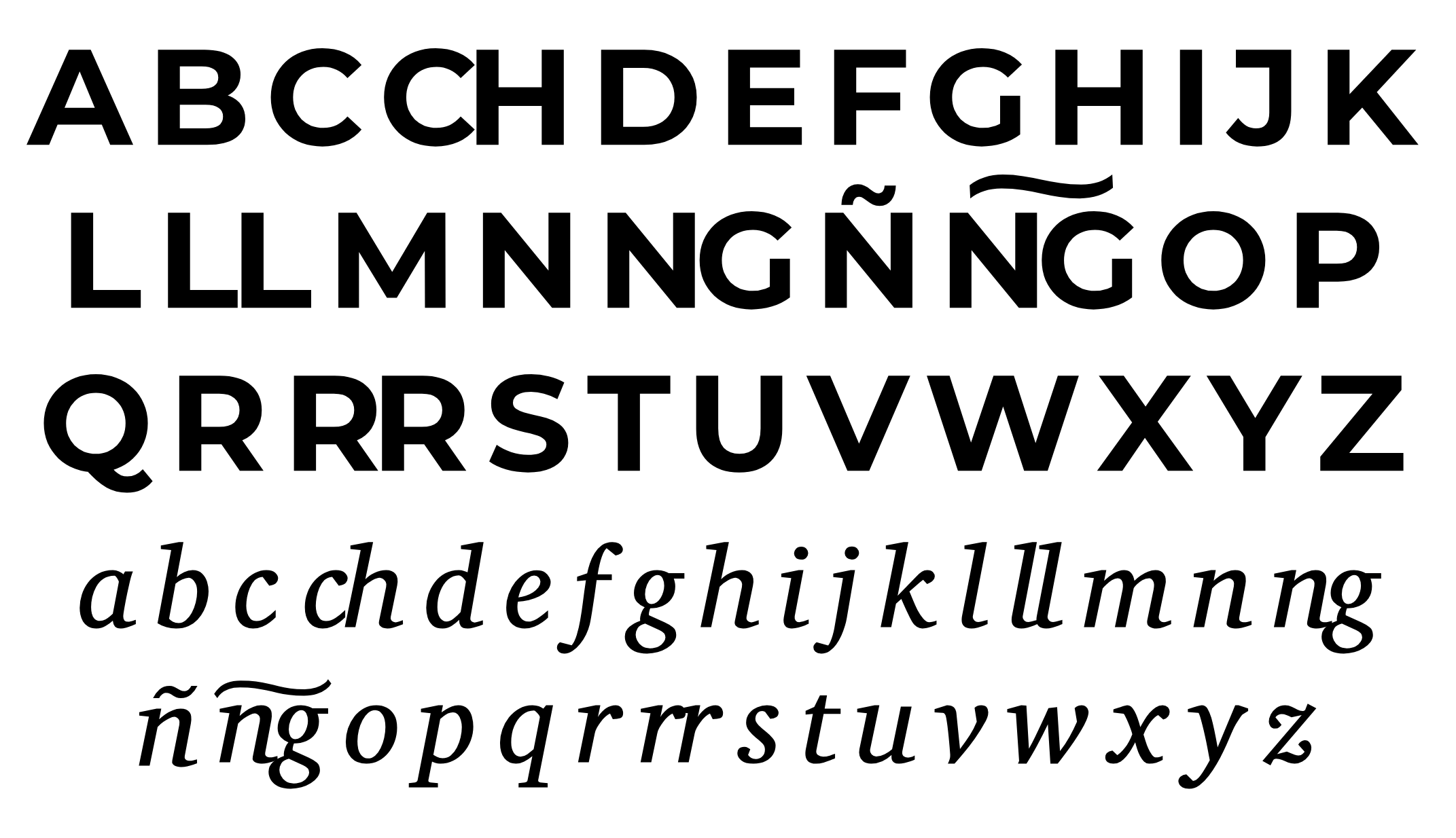
The Abecedario, used from the late 16th century to the early 20th century.

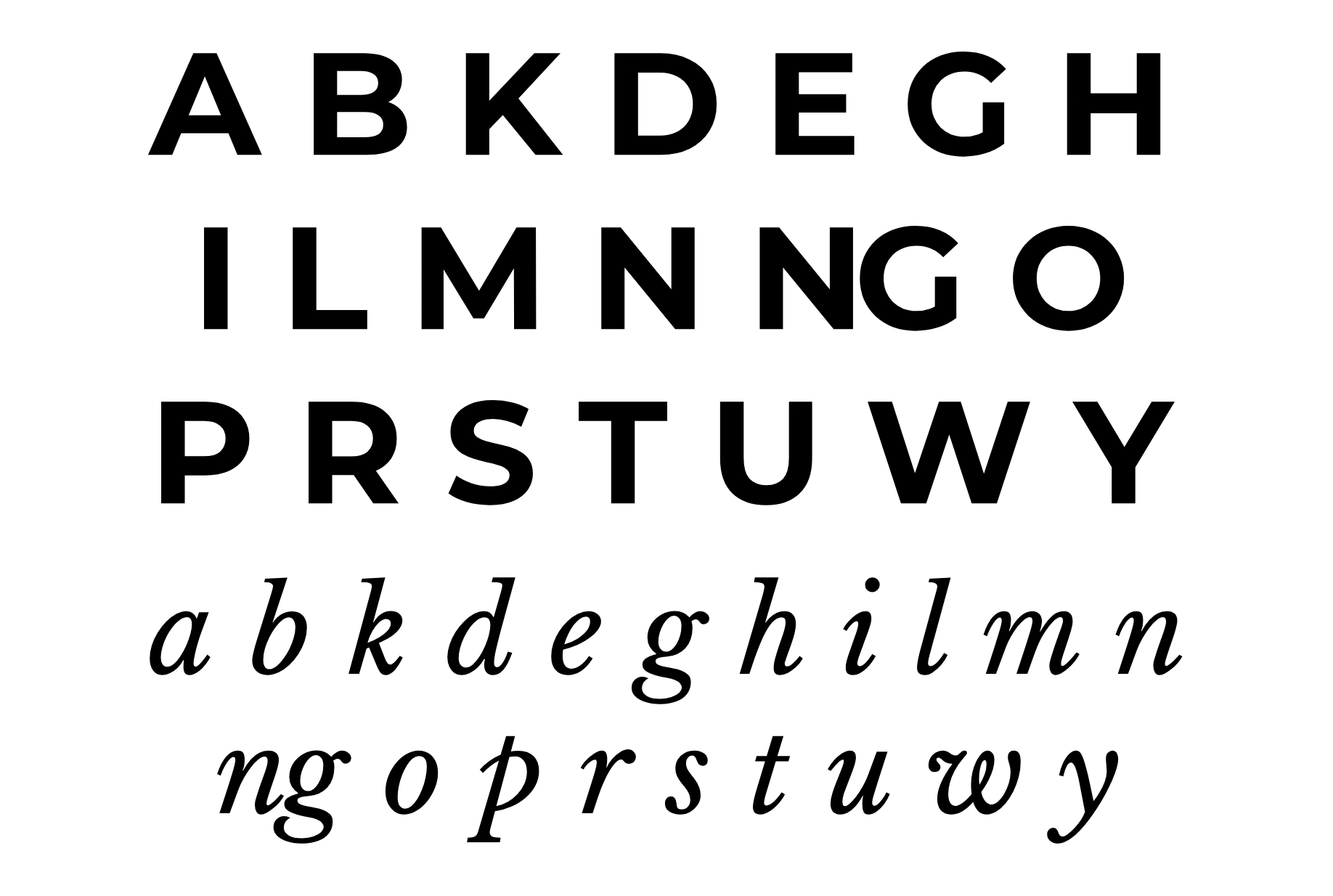
The Abakada, introduced in 1940 and was officially used until 1977.

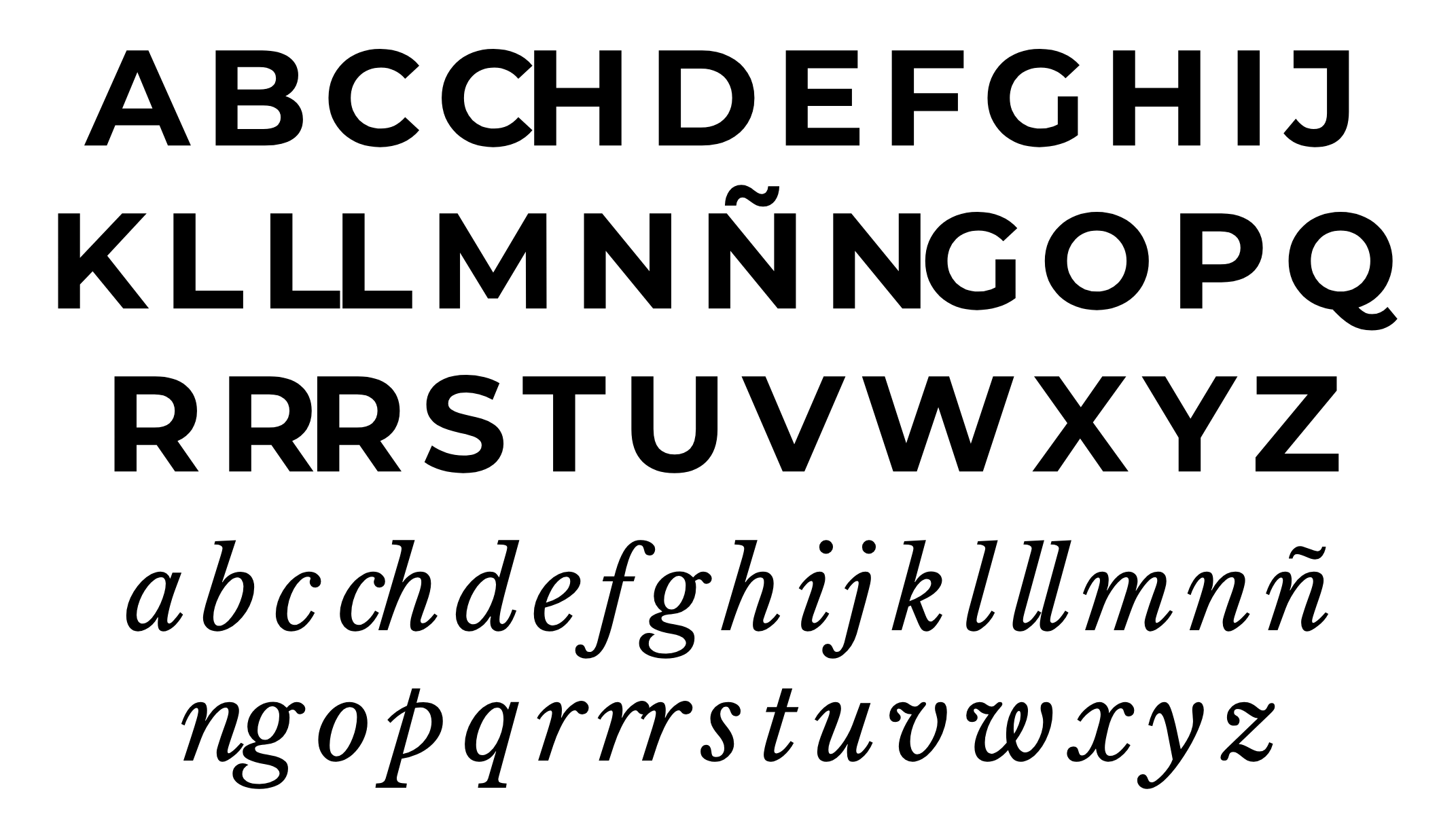
The 31-letter "enriched" Filipino alphabet used between 1977 and 1987.

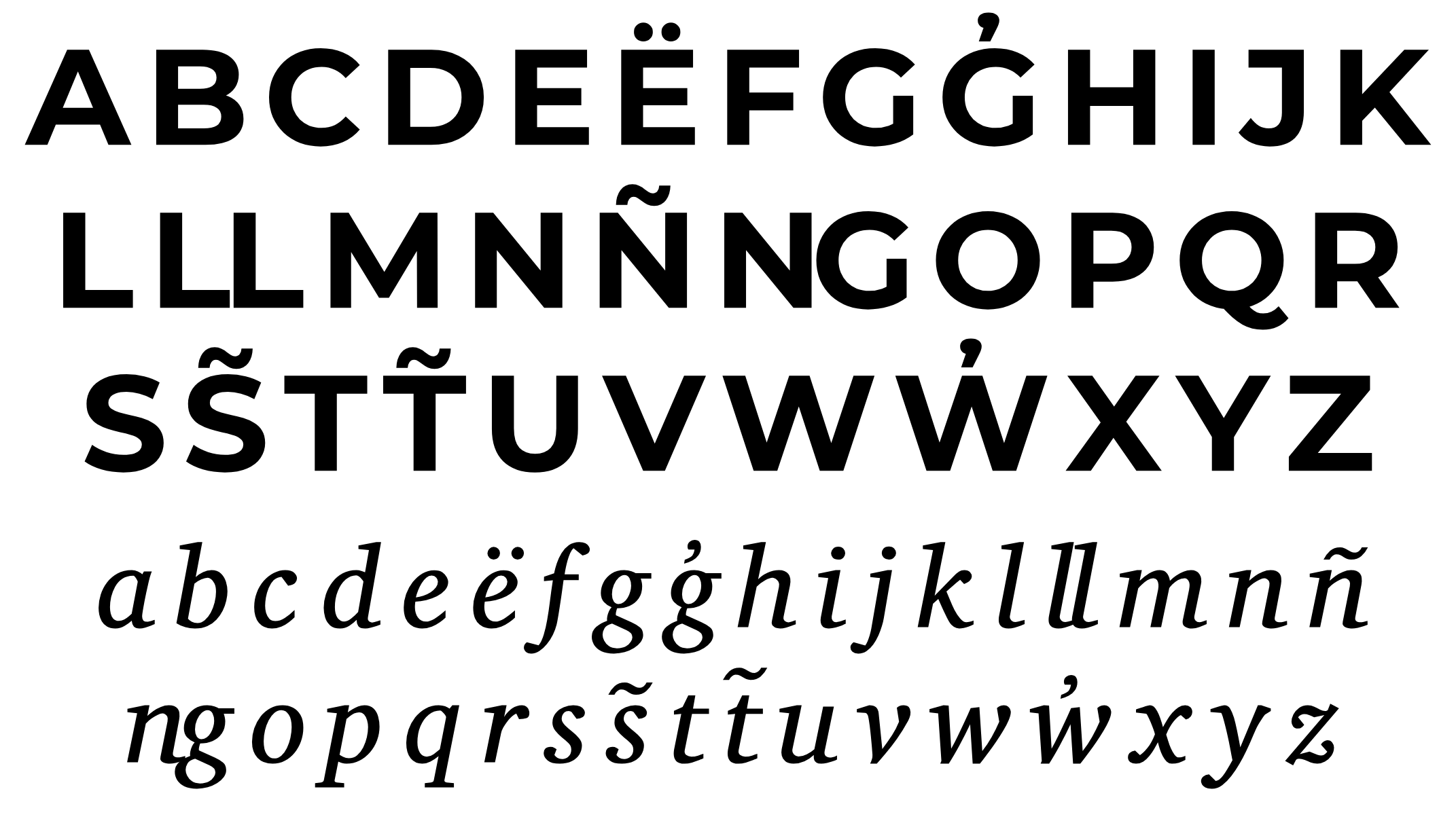
The extended Filipino alphabet as of 2024.

== Character encoding ==
The Filipino alphabet is supported by several character encoding systems for computers. All the letters, whether it is a precomposed character or a decomposed character sequence, reside within the Basic Multilingual Plane of Unicode, and thus are fully compatible with Unicode-based systems such as UTF-8, UTF-16, and UTF-32. ISO/IEC 8859-1 (Latin-1), Windows-1252, and 3GPP 23.038 are also popular systems in the Philippines that largely support the Filipino alphabet.

The graphemes in the Filipino alphabet that are not found in the ISO basic Latin alphabet can be composed using the following HTML character entities and Unicode codepoints:

Majuscule form	Ä	B̓	Ë	Ḟ	G̓	K̇	Ñ	S̃	T̃	W̓
Keyboard shortcut (for Word and Writer)	C4 ↓ Alt + X (Note: The following may also be used: Ctrl + Shift + : then A Alt + 142 (Numeric keypad is required.) Alt + 0196 (Numeric keypad is required.))	BU+313 ↓ Alt + X (Note: The following may also be used: B then Alt + 787 (Numeric keypad is required.))	CB ↓ Alt + X (Note: The following may also be used: Ctrl + Shift + : then E Alt + 0203 (Numeric keypad is required.))	1E1E ↓ Alt + X (Note: The following may also be used: F then Alt + 775 (Numeric keypad is required.))	G313 ↓ Alt + X (Note: The following may also be used: G then Alt + 787 (Numeric keypad is required.))	K307 ↓ Alt + X (Note: The following may also be used: K then Alt + 775 (Numeric keypad is required.))	D1 ↓ Alt + X (Note: The following may also be used: Ctrl + Shift + ~ then N Alt + 165 (Numeric keypad is required.) Alt + 0209 (Numeric keypad is required.))	S303 ↓ Alt + X (Note: The following may also be used: S then Alt + 771 (Numeric keypad is required.))	T303 ↓ Alt + X (Note: The following may also be used: T then Alt + 771 (Numeric keypad is required.))	W313 ↓ Alt + X (Note: The following may also be used: W then Alt + 787 (Numeric keypad is required.))
HTML character code	&Auml; &#196;	B&#787;	&Euml; &#203;	&#7710;	G&#787;	K&#775;	&Ntilde; &#209;	S&#771;	T&#771;	W&#787;
Unicode (hexadecimal)	U+00C4	U+0042 \U+0313	U+00CB	U+1E1E	U+0047 \U+0313	U+004B \U+0307	U+00D1	U+0053 \U+0303	U+0054 \U+0303	U+0057 \U+0313
Unicode (decimal)	196	66 + 787	203	7710	71 + 787	75 + 775	209	83 + 771	84 + 771	87 + 787
Minuscule form	ä	b̓	ë	ḟ	g̓	k̇	ñ	s̃	t̃	w̓
Keyboard shortcut (for Word and Writer)	e4 ↓ Alt + x (Note: The following may also be used: Ctrl + Shift + : then a Alt + 132 (Numeric keypad is required.) Alt + 0228 (Numeric keypad is required.))	bu+313 ↓ Alt + x (Note: The following may also be used: b then Alt + 787 (Numeric keypad is required.))	eb ↓ Alt + x (Note: The following may also be used: Ctrl + Shift + : then e Alt + 137 (Numeric keypad is required.) Alt + 0235 (Numeric keypad is required.))	1e1f ↓ Alt + x (Note: The following may also be used: f then Alt + 775 (Numeric keypad is required.))	g313 ↓ Alt + x (Note: The following may also be used: g then Alt + 787 (Numeric keypad is required.))	k307 ↓ Alt + x (Note: The following may also be used: k then Alt + 775 (Numeric keypad is required.))	f1 ↓ Alt + x (Note: The following may also be used: Ctrl + Shift + ~ then n Alt + 164 (Numeric keypad is required.) Alt + 0241 (Numeric keypad is required.))	s303 ↓ Alt + x (Note: The following may also be used: s then Alt + 771 (Numeric keypad is required.))	t303 ↓ Alt + x (Note: The following may also be used: t then Alt + 771 (Numeric keypad is required.))	w313 ↓ Alt + x (Note: The following may also be used: w then Alt + 787 (Numeric keypad is required.))
HTML character code	&auml; &#228;	b&#787;	&euml; &#235;	&#7711;	g&#787;	k&#775;	&ntilde; &#241;	s&#771;	t&#771;	w&#787;
Unicode (hexadecimal)	U+00E4	U+0062 \U+0313	U+00EB	U+1E1F	U+0067 \U+0313	U+006B \U+0307	U+00F1	U+0073 \U+0303	U+0074 \U+0303	U+0077 \U+0313
Unicode (decimal)	228	98 + 787	235	7711	103 + 787	107 + 775	241	115 + 771	116 + 771	119 + 787

As for the diacritics, the following are their Unicode hexadecimal (and decimal) codepoints: ⟨◌́⟩ U+0301 (769), ⟨◌̀⟩ U+0300 (768), ⟨◌̂⟩ U+0302 (770), ⟨◌̃⟩ U+0303 (771), ⟨◌̈⟩ U+0308 (776), ⟨◌̄⟩ U+0304 (772), ⟨◌̇⟩ U+0307 (775), ⟨◌̓⟩ U+0313 (787), and ⟨◌͡◌⟩ U+0307 (775).

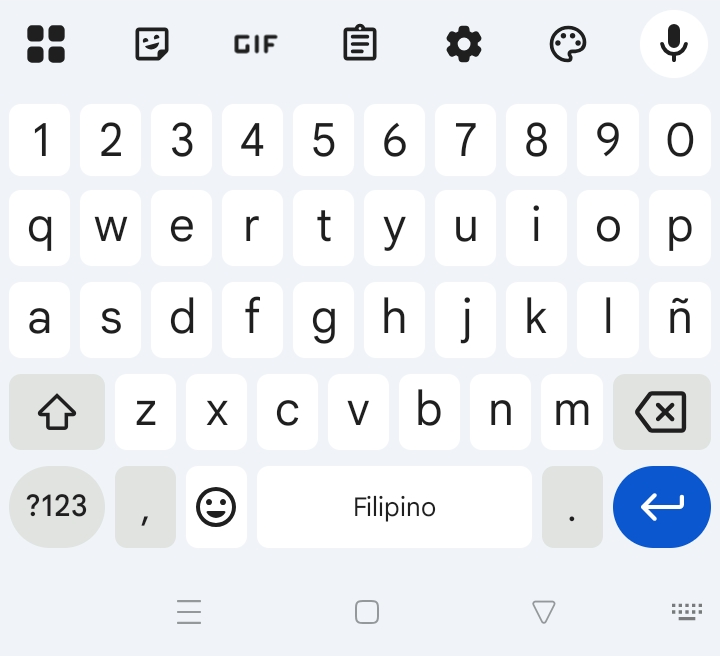
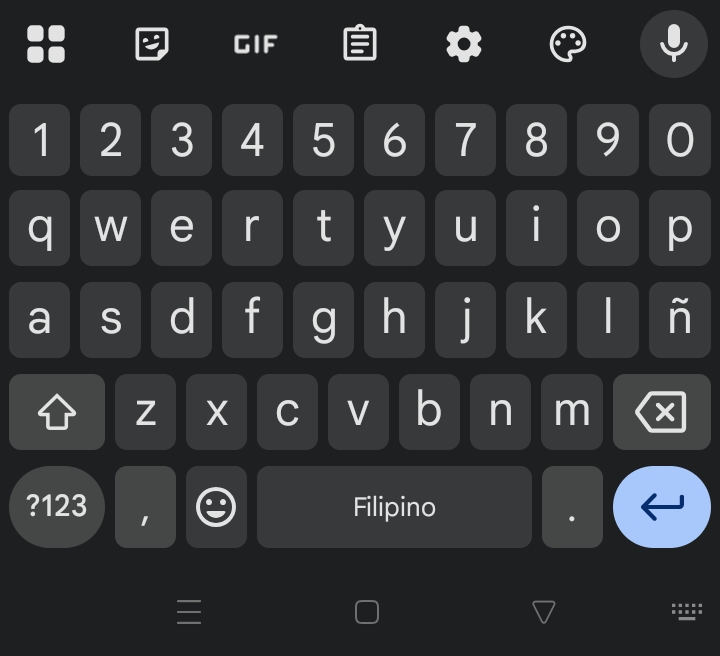
A modified QWERTY keyboard on Android for Filipino, in light and dark modes.

== See also ==
- Filipino orthography
- Comparison of orthographies of Philippine languages
- Philippine scripts
- Tagbanwa script
- Hanunuo script
- Buhid script
- Kawi script
- Eskayan script
- Kulitan script
- Baybayin script
- Filipino braille
- Filipino sign language
