= Kalamian =

Kalamian may refer to:

- Kalamian languages, or Calamian languages, a small cluster of languages spoken in the Philippines:
- Kalamian Tagbanwa, or Calamian Tagbanwa language, a language spoken on Palawan Island in the Philippines
- Rex Kalamian, American basketball coach of Armenian descent

== See also ==
- Kalam (disambiguation)
