= Tagalog grammar =

Grammar of the Tagalog language

Tagalog grammar (Tagalog: Balarilà ng Tagalog) are the rules that describe the structure of expressions in the Tagalog language, one of the languages in the Philippines.

In Tagalog, traditional grammar recognizes nine parts of speech: nouns (pangngalan), pronouns (panghalíp), verbs (pandiwà), adverbs (pang-abay), adjectives (pang-urì), prepositions (pang-ukol), conjunctions (pangatníg), ligatures (pang-angkóp) and particles (pantukoy).

== Overview ==
The grammar of Tagalog is agglutinative, predicate-initial, and organized around the Austronesian alignment system, in which intricate verbal morphology indicates which semantic role is associated with the topic ("ang"-marked) argument.

Tagalog verbs combine a wide array of prefixes, infixes, suffixes, circumfixes, and clitic particles to express voice/"trigger", aspect, mood, and valency changes, resulting in morphologically complex predicate structures.

Tagalog noun morphology is relatively simple compared to its verbal system, though nouns are also productively derived from a range of affixes. Grammatical roles are expressed not by case endings but by a three-way article system (ang, ng, sa) placed directly before the noun clause, distinguishing topic, non-topic, and oblique arguments. Pronouns reflect distinctions in person, number, clusivity, and case.

Word order is typically verb-initial, though SVO may be used in formal contexts. Because the voice/trigger system and article markers indicate grammatical roles, arguments can be freely rearranged to shift focus or emphasize different participants without changing the core meaning.

A defining feature of the language is its productive reduplication system, which includes partial and full reduplication. These patterns perform both grammatical and derivational functions, marking imperfective aspect, intensity, plurality, distributive or repeated action, among other functions.

Another important feature is phonemic stress, wherein the placement of stress is lexically contrastive: identical sequence of sounds can represent distinct words depending on stress and the presence or absence of a glottal stop (e.g., basa “to read” vs. basâ “wet”). Stress interacts with affixation and reduplication in systematic but sometimes nontransparent ways.

== Morphophonology ==
=== Reduplication ===
Reduplication in Tagalog is a complex yet productive process. It may be classified based on the phonological shape of the reduplicant (whether partial or full reduplication), degree of morphological productivity, and associated semantic functions.

==== Morphological productivity ====
Productive reduplication is a regular morphological process that applies to a wide range of lexical items, expresses a predictable derivational meaning, and systematically interacts with grammatical categories such as verbal aspect, plurality, intensity, and distributivity. Because of its clear grammatical function, it is considered the “significant” type of reduplication in Tagalog. This process is synchronically analyzable by speakers and can be freely applied to new or foreign words. Examples:

- puntá "come" → púpuntá “will come”
- magandá "beautiful"→ magágandá “beautiful (plural)”
- kutitap "flicker" → kumúkutíkutitap “flickering intensively, here and there”
- tatló "three" → tatló-tatló “three at time”

Lexicalized reduplicative roots are words that appear reduplicated but are not synchronically analyzable as products of a productive reduplication process. As such, this may also be known as "non-productive" or "non-significant" reduplication. Although many such words may have originated historically through reduplication, modern speakers do not derive them from an independent word base. Examples include:

- babae “woman” (inherited from Proto-Austronesian *ba-bahi, reduplicated form of *bahi)
- tutubí “dragonfly”
- pakpák “wing”
- lupaypáy “exhausted”

Most reduplicated-looking nouns and ideophones fall into this category.

==== Phonological shape of reduplicant ====
Partial reduplication involves the repetition of a syllabic portion of the root or affixed stem. The various types of partial reduplication are as follows:

1. Reduplication of the initial consonant and vowel (CV) of the root or affix. This is the most common type as it is central to aspect marking in verbs, among other functions – making it a highly productive pattern of reduplication.
  Examples: (reduplicant is underlined)
  - susulat "will write" ← sulat "write, letter"
  - makíkikain "will eat at someone else's place" ← makikain ("to eat at someone else's place", from maki- + kain)
  1. In root words beginning with a vowel, the reduplicated consonant corresponds to the glottal stop that inherently precedes word-initial vowels in Tagalog; e.g. íinóm (pronounced /ˌʔiʔiˈnom/, "will drink") from inóm (/ʔiˈnom/, "drinking")
  2. Certain words displaying initial-syllable reduplication (typically nouns) are synchronically unanalyzable as productive reduplication, and are therefore morphologically “non-significant”.
    - For example, babae (“woman”), lalaki (“man”), and gagambá (“spider”) are not derived from independent roots (i.e., there are no such base words as *bae, *laki, or *gamba which they could have been derived from) and function as simple lexical items.
2. Reduplication of the first two syllables in polysyllabic roots, minus the final consonant (coda) of the second syllable if present. This is used productively in polysyllabic roots in place of full reduplication. A hyphen may be orthographically placed between the reduplicant and the base word:
  - baí-baitáng (“gradual”) ← baitáng (“step”); used instead of baitáng-baitáng which is seldom used
  - balí-baligtád ("turned around continually", "all turned inside up") ← baligtád ("reverse"); notice how the coda of the second syllable (i.e., [g]) is not part of the reduplicant, as *balig-baligtad is never used
3. Reduplication of the final syllable; this type is always non-productive:
  - kilala ("known")
  - kulimlím ("overcast"; compare limlím "brooding")
  - bulaklák ("flower"; compare bulak "cotton")
4. Reduplication of the final syllable of a disyllabic word, where the final syllable "copies" the initial consonant of the first syllable and the final vowel-consonant sequence of the second syllable; this is also always non-productive:
  - tagaytáy ("mountain range"; compare taytáy "bridge, mountain range")
  - halakhák (“boisterous laughter”)
  Reduplicated words of this type may have been historically derived from base words affixed with now non-productive infixes such as -al- and -ag-.
5. Combination of partial reduplication types:
  - bábalíbaligtád ("will turn around continually"), from CV- + CVCV- + baligtád
  - makíkilala ("will get to know someone"), from ma- + CV- + kilalá

Full reduplication consists of repeating the entire word base or monosyllabic sequence of sounds. Examples include:

1. Reduplication of an existing root word. This is a productive process, and a hyphen is always used to separate the base and the reduplicant:
  - araw-araw ("every day") ← araw ("day" or "sun")
  - háka-hakà (“rumor”) ← hakà (“idea, suspicion”)
2. Reduplication of a word base that does not exist independently. These forms are lexicalized and are written as a single word, except when a hyphen is required to mark a glottal stop.
  - alaala (“memory”), *ala alone does not exist
  - ilang-ilang (“Cananga odorata”), *ilang alone does not exist
3. Full reduplication with intervening connective (na/-ng, at/-’t, nang); always productive:
  - paskóng-paskó ("truly Christmas, Christmas-Christmas"), from paskó + na + paskó
  - isá’t-isá ("each other"), from isá + at + isá
  - lakad nang lakad ("walking about a lot")
4. Monosyllabic reduplication; [u] is lowered to [o] in final syllables; always lexical:
  - pakpák ("wing")
  - sipsíp ("suck up")
  - tuktók (“summit”)
5. Monosyllabic reduplication with an intervening vowel; always lexical:
  - sagisag ("emblem")
  - patupat ("cigarette holder")
  - hayahay ("freshness")

== Verbs ==
Tagalog verbs are complex and are changed by taking on many affixes reflecting voice/trigger, aspect and mood. Below is a chart of the main verbal affixes, which consist of a variety of prefixes, suffixes, infixes, and circumfixes.

Conventions used in the chart:

- CV~ stands for reduplication of the first syllable of a root word; that is, the first consonant (if any) and the first vowel of the word.
- N stands for a nasal consonant, which are m, n, or ng.
  - m is used when the prefixed word starts with the consonants b or p
  - n is used before the consonants d, t, and l
  - in all other cases, ng /ŋ/ is used
- ∅ means that the verb root is used, therefore no affixes are added.
- Punctuation marks indicate the type of affix a particular bound morpheme is:
  - hyphens mark prefixes if placed after the morpheme (e.g., mag-), or suffixes if placed before it (e.g., -han)
  - ⟨⟩ marks infixes, which is typically placed before the first vowel of the word, and after the first consonant if there is any. Thus, the word "sumulat" (s⟨um⟩ulat) is composed of the root word sulat and the infix ⟨um⟩.
  - ~ is used to separate the reduplicated morpheme (CV), from the root word, such that "susulat" is written as (su~sulat) and "sumusulat" as (s⟨um⟩u~sulat).

	Complete	Progressive	Contemplative	Infinitive	Imperative
Actor trigger I	⟨um⟩ bumasa	C⟨um⟩V~ bumabasa	CV~ babasa	⟨um⟩ bumasa	∅ (verb root) basa
Actor trigger II	nag- nagbasa	nag-CV~ nagbabasa	mag-CV~ magbabasa	mag- magbasa	pag- pagbasa
Actor trigger III	na- nabasa	na-CV~ nababasa	ma-CV~ mababasa	ma- mabasa	∅
Actor trigger IV	naN- (nang-, nam-, nan-) nangbasa (nambasa)	naN-CV~ nangbabasa (nambabasa)	maN-CV~ mangbabasa (mambabasa)	maN- mangbasa (mambasa)	paN- pangbasa (pambasa)
Object trigger I	⟨in⟩ binasa	C⟨in⟩V~ binabasa	CV~ ... -(h)in babasahin	-(h)in basahin	-a (or verb root) basaha
Object trigger II	i⟨in⟩- ibinasa	i-C⟨in⟩V~ ibinabasa	i-CV~ ibabasa	i- ibasa	-(h)an/-(h)in basaan
Object trigger III	⟨in⟩ ... -(h)an binasahan	C⟨in⟩V~ ... -(h)an binabasahan	CV~ ... -(h)an babasahan	-(h)an basahan	-(h)i basahi
Locative trigger	⟨in⟩ ... -(h)an binasahan	C⟨in⟩V~ ... -(h)an binabasahan	CV~ ... -(h)an babasahan	-(h)an basahan	-(h)i basahi
Benefactive trigger	i⟨in⟩- ibinasa	i-C⟨in⟩V~ ibinabasa	i-CV~ ibabasa	i- ibasa	-(h)an basahan
Instrument trigger	ip⟨in⟩aN- ipinambasa	ip⟨in⟩aN-CV~ ipinambabasa	ipaN-CV~ ipambabasa	ipaN- ipambasa	∅
Reason trigger	ik⟨in⟩a- ikinabasa	ik⟨in⟩a-CV~ ikinababasa	ika-CV~ ikababasa	ika- ikabasa	∅

With object-focus verbs in the completed and progressive aspects, the infix -in- frequently becomes the prefix ni- if the root word begins with /l/, /r/, /w/, or /j/; e.g., linalapitan or nilalapitan and inilagáy or ilinagáy.

When suffixing -in and -an to a word that ends in a vowel, an epenthetic h is inserted. This helps to distinguish them from words that have a glottal stop, which is usually not written except when diacritical marks are applied, such that "basa" (to read) becomes "basahin" while "basa" (to be wet, otherwise spelt as "basâ") becomes "basaín" pronounced with a glottal stop.

The imperative affixes are not often used in Manila, but they do exist in other Tagalog speaking provinces.

=== Archaic Forms ===
	Complete	Progressive	Contemplative	Infinitive	Imperative
Archaic Actor trigger I (Unassimilated)	⟨ungm⟩ or ⟨ingm⟩ bungmasa, tingmingin	C⟨ungm⟩V~ or C⟨ingm⟩V~ bungmabasa, tingmitingin	CV~ babasa	⟨um⟩ bumasa	∅
Archaic Actor trigger I (Assimilated)	b/p → n nasa	b/p → n + REDUP nanasa	CV~ babasa	b/p → m masa	∅

In old Tagalog, the complete and progressive aspects of actor trigger I was marked with the affix "-ungm-" or "-ingm-', while "-um-" was used solely as the infinitive form. The rule is that when a verb has an "i" in its initial syllable, the infix used is "-ingm-" like "tingmingin" (looked, complete aspect) and "tingmitingin" (is looking, progressive aspect), otherwise "-ungm-" is used. This is a case called vowel harmony.

Another archaic feature is when a verb starts in a "b" or "p", which becomes an "n" for the complete and progressive aspects, and "m" for infinitive while contemplative is still CV- reduplication. The word "pasok" (to enter) therefore becomes "nasok" (complete), "nanasok" (progressive), "papasok" (contemplative), and "masok" (infinitive). Though these have been lost in the Manila dialect, they are preserved in some Tagalog dialects. The allophones "d" and "r" are still somewhat preserved when it comes to verbs like "dating (to arrive)" but it is sometimes ignored.

=== Trigger ===
The central feature of verbs in Tagalog and other Philippine languages is the trigger system, often called voice or focus. In this system, the thematic relation (agent, patient, or other oblique relations – location, direction, etc.) of the noun marked by the direct-case particle is encoded in the verb.

==== List of triggers and examples ====
The actor trigger marks the direct noun as the agent (doer) of the action:

- Bumilí ng saging ang lalaki sa tindahan para sa unggóy.

The man bought a banana at the store for the monkey.

The object trigger marks the direct noun as the patient (receiver) of the action:

- Binilí ng lalaki ang saging sa tindahan para sa unggóy.

The man bought the banana at the store for the monkey.

The locative trigger marks the direct noun as the location or direction of an action or the area affected by the action.

The man bought a banana at/from the store.

- Binilhán ng lalaki ng saging ang tindahan. (formal/dated form)
- Pinagbilhán ng lalaki ng saging ang tindahan. (colloquial form)

The benefactive trigger marks the direct noun as the person or thing that benefits from the action; i.e., the beneficiary of an action.

The man bought a banana for the monkey.

- Ibinilí ng lalaki ng saging ang unggóy. (formal/dated form)
- Binilhán ng lalaki ng saging ang unggóy. (colloquial form)

The instrumental trigger marks the direct noun as the means by which the action is performed.

- Ipinambilí ng lalaki ng saging ang pera ng asawa niyá.

The man bought a banana with his spouse's money.

The reason trigger marks the direct noun as the cause or reason why an action is performed. It is mostly used exclusively with verbs of emotion.

- Ikinagulat ng lalaki ang pagdatíng ng unggóy.

The man got surprised because of the monkey's arrival.

==== Actor trigger forms ====
Also known as the agent trigger, agent focus, actor focus, or by the abbreviations AT or AF. This verb form triggers a reading of the direct noun (marked by "ang") as the agent of the clause. The main affixes/forms under this trigger are -um-, mag-, ma-, and mang-; while their derivatives (e.g., maka-, ma- -an, magsi-, etc.) may also function as actor focus.

Some verb roots only take one of the main affixes to form the actor trigger of that verb, such as "tingín" (to look) which only uses the -um- conjugation as its actor trigger form. Other root words may take two or more, such as "sulat" (to write) which could take mag- and -um- conjugations. In such instances, the different verb forms may have the same exact meaning, or they may have some slight nuances. In the case of "sulat", "magsulat" is closer to the meaning of physically writing a letter, while "sumulat" is closer to the meaning of sending a letter out. "sayáw" (to dance), on the other hand, has "sumayáw" and "magsayáw" which mean the same thing. Furthermore, there are a few root verbs that derive opposite meanings through these affixes, such as in the case of "bilí" (to buy), where "bumilí" means to buy and "magbilí" is to sell.

The difference between these four actor trigger forms are complicated and there seems to be no consistent rule dictating when one form should be used over another. That said, memorizing what affixes a verb root uses and its corresponding meaning is essential in learning Tagalog.

- ma- is only used with a few roots which are semantically intransitive, for example, matulog (to sleep) and maligò (to bathe). Ma- is not to be confused with ma-, a patient-trigger prefix verb form.

==== Object trigger forms ====
Otherwise known as the patient trigger, patient focus, object focus, or by its initials OT, OF, PT, or PF. This verb form triggers a reading of the direct noun (marked by "ang") as the patient of the clause. There are three main affixes/forms used in this trigger, -in-, i-, and -an:

- -in is the most commonly used patient trigger form. It is generally used with:
  - actions that involve movement towards the agent: kainin (to eat something), bilhín (to buy something).
  - actions that involve permanent change: basagin (to crack something), patayín (to kill something).
  - actions that involve thought: isipin (to think of something), alalahanin (to remember something).
- i- is also a benefactive trigger, but when used as an object trigger, it denotes actions which involve something that is moved away from an agent: ibigáy (to give something), ilagáy (to put something), itaním (to plant something).
- -an can also serve as a locative or benefactive trigger, but as an object trigger, it denotes actions involving a surface change (doing unto something): hugasan (to rinse something), walisán (to sweep something off), sulatan (to write on a surface).

Affixes can also be used in nouns or adjectives: baligtarán (from baligtád, to reverse) (reversible), katamarán (from tamád, lazy) (laziness), kasabihán (from sabi, to say) (proverb), kasagutan (from sagót, answer), bayarín (from bayad, to pay) (payment), bukirín (from bukid, farm), lupaín (from lupà, land), pagkakaroón (from doón/roón, there) (having/appearance), and pagdárasál (from dasál, prayer). Verbs with affixes (mostly suffixes) are also used as nouns, which are differentiated by stress position. Examples are panoórin (to watch or view) and panoorín (materials to be watched or viewed), hangarín (to wish) and hangárin (goal/objective), arálin (to study) and aralín (studies), and bayáran (to pay) and bayarán (someone or something for hire).

=== Aspect ===
The aspect of the verb indicates the progressiveness of the verb. It specifies whether the action happened, is happening, or will happen. Tagalog verbs are conjugated for time using aspect rather than tense, which can be easily expressed with phrases and time prepositions.

Aspect	Use	Example sentence	Meaning
Completed (Perfective)	indicates that the action has been completed	Naglutò ang babae	The woman cooked
Completed (Perfective)	indicates that the action has been completed	Naglutò na ang babae	The woman has/had cooked
Uncompleted (Imperfective)	indicates that the action has started, but not completed and is ongoing; also indicates habitual actions and general facts	Naglulutò ang babae	The woman cooks
Uncompleted (Imperfective)	indicates that the action has started, but not completed and is ongoing; also indicates habitual actions and general facts	Naglulutò na ang babae	The woman is (already) cooking
Uncompleted (Imperfective)	indicates that the action has started, but not completed and is ongoing; also indicates habitual actions and general facts	Naglulutò pa ang babae	The woman is (still) cooking
Unstarted (Contemplative)	indicates that the action has not been started	Maglulutò ang babae	The woman will cook
Unstarted (Contemplative)	indicates that the action has not been started	Maglulutò na ang babae	The woman is going to cook (now)
Unstarted (Contemplative)	indicates that the action has not been started	Maglulutò pa ang babae	The woman is yet to cook
Recently completed	indicates that the action has been completed just before the time of speaking or just before some other specified time	Kalulutò lang ng babae	The woman has just cooked

==== Infinitive (Pawatas) ====
This serves as the base form of the verb, and is not marked by aspect. It is typically used in modal and subjunctive constructions. It is also used in standard Tagalog as the basis for the imperative form of the verb, by adding a second-person pronoun, such as ka/mo (you) and kayó/ninyó (you all), directly after it.

This is formed by affixing a verbal trigger suffix to the root word.

Root Word	Affix	Base Form	Trigger
alís (leave)	-um-	umalís (to leave)	Actor trigger I
kain (eat)	-um-	kumain (to eat)	Actor trigger I
sulat (write)	mag-	magsulát (to write)	Actor trigger II
tulog (sleep)	ma-	matulog (to sleep)	Actor trigger III
hingî (ask/request)	mang-	manghingî (to ask/request)	Actor trigger IV
alís (leave)	-(h)in	alisín (to remove)	Object trigger I
basa (read)	-(h)in	basahin (to read)	Object trigger I
bigáy (give)	i-	ibigáy(to give)	Object trigger II
bilí (buy)	-(h)an	bilhán (to buy from)	Locative trigger
balík (return)	i-	ibalík (to bring back)	Benefactive trigger
hugas (wash)	ipang-	ipanghugas (to use for washing)	Instrumental trigger
galák (joy)	ika-	ikagalák (to bring joy)	Reason trigger

Examples of infinitive use in modal sentences:

Grammatical mood	Example	Meaning
Subjunctive	dapat matulog ka	you should sleep
Optative	sana ibigáy mo	I hope you will give (it)
Necessitative	kailangan niláng kumain	they need to eat
Imperative	basahin mo na	read it now
Prohibitive	huwág kang manghingî ng tawad	don't ask for forgiveness

==== Perfective (Naganáp) ====
Also known as the complete or completed aspect. This implies that the action was done in the past, prior to the time of speaking or some other specified time. This aspect is characterized by:

- the use of the infix -in- in all triggers except the actor trigger
- the alteration of initial m to n in mag-, ma-, and mang- (actor triggers II, III, and IV)
- no change with -um- (actor trigger I)

In the complete aspect of the object trigger -in, that suffix -in (or -hin) is removed. This is in contrast with other triggers where the trigger affix remains.

Root Word	Trigger	Base Form	Affix	Complete Aspect
alís (leave)	Actor trigger I	umalís (to leave)	no change	umalís (left)
kain (eat)	Actor trigger I	kumain (to eat)	no change	kumain (ate)
sulat (write)	Actor trigger II	magsulat (to write)	mag- → nag-	nagsulat (wrote)
tulog (sleep)	Actor trigger III	matulog (to sleep)	ma- → na-	natulog (slept)
hingî (ask/request)	Actor trigger IV	manghingî (to ask/request)	mang- → nang-	nanghingî (asked/requested)
alís (leave)	Object trigger I	alisín (to remove)	remove -in + add -in-	inalís (removed)
basa (read)	Object trigger I	basahin (to read)	remove -hin + add -in-	binasa (read)
bigáy (give)	Object trigger II	ibigáy(to give)	add -in-	ibinigáy (given)
bilí (buy)	Locative trigger	bilhán (to buy from)	add -in-	binilhán (bought from)
balík (return)	Benefactive trigger	ibalík (to bring back)	add -in-	ibinalík (brought back)
hugas (wash)	Instrumental trigger	ipanghugas (to use for washing)	add -in-	ipinanghugas (used for washing)
galák (joy)	Reason trigger	ikagalák (to bring joy)	add -in-	ikinagalák (brought joy)

On its own, the perfective verb may not necessarily imply that the action is completed. Adding the particle na directly after it strengthens the notion that it is in fact completed. Compare this with the difference between English simple past and past perfect tenses.

	Without particle	With particle
Example	pumuntá akó sa Baguio pagdatíng nilá	pumuntá na akó sa Baguio pagdatíng nilá
Meaning	I went to Baguio when they came	I have (already) gone to Baguio when they came

==== Imperfective (Nagaganap) ====
Also known as the progressive or uncompleted aspect. This implies that the action has started, is ongoing, and not yet completed. It is also used with habitual actions, or actions that signify general facts. This aspect is characterized by the reduplication of the first syllable of the root word, followed by application of the same morphological rules as seen with the complete aspect. If the base form of the verb has its stress on the last syllable, a secondary stress usually falls on the reduplicated syllable.

Root Word	Trigger	Base Form	Affix	Uncompleted Aspect
alís (leave)	Actor trigger I	umalís (to leave)	CV reduplication	umáalís (leaving)
kain (eat)	Actor trigger I	kumain (to eat)	CV reduplication	kumakain (eating)
sulat (write)	Actor trigger II	magsulát (to write)	CV reduplication + mag- → nag-	nagsúsulát (writing)
tulog (sleep)	Actor trigger III	matulog (to sleep)	CV reduplication + ma- → na-	natutulog (sleeping)
hingî (ask/request)	Actor trigger IV	manghingî (to ask/request)	CV reduplication + mang- → nang-	nanghíhingì (asking/requesting)
alís (leave)	Object trigger I	alisín (to remove)	CV reduplication + remove -in + add -in-	ináalís (removing)
basa (read)	Object trigger I	basahin (to read)	CV reduplication + remove -hin + add -in-	binabasa (reading)
bigáy (give)	Object trigger II	ibigáy(to give)	CV reduplication + add -in-	ibiníbigáy (giving)
bilí (buy)	Locative trigger	bilhán (to buy from)	CV reduplication + add -in-	biníbilhán (buying from)
balík (return)	Benefactive trigger	ibalík (to bring back)	CV reduplication + add -in-	ibinábalík (bringing back)
hugas (wash)	Instrumental trigger	ipanghugas (to use for washing)	CV reduplication + add -in-	ipinanghuhugas (using for washing)
galák (joy)	Reason trigger	ikagalák (to bring joy)	CV reduplication + add -in-	ikinagágalák (bringing joy)

==== Contemplative (Magaganap) ====
This implies that the action has not yet started but anticipated. This aspect is characterized solely by the reduplication of the first syllable of the root word.

In the contemplative aspect of the actor trigger -um-, that infix -um- is removed.

Root Word	Trigger	Base Form	Affix	Contemplative Aspect
alís (leave)	Actor trigger I	umalís (to leave)	remove -um- + CV reduplication	áalís (will leave)
kain (eat)	Actor trigger I	kumain (to eat)	remove -um- + CV reduplication	kakain (will eat)
sulat (write)	Actor trigger II	magsulat (to write)	CV reduplication	magsúsulát (will write)
tulog (sleep)	Actor trigger III	matulog (to sleep)	CV reduplication	matutulog (will sleep)
hingî (ask/request)	Actor trigger IV	manghingî (to ask/request)	CV reduplication	manghíhingì (will ask/request)
alís (leave)	Object trigger I	alisín (to remove)	CV reduplication	áalisín (will remove)
basa (read)	Object trigger I	basahin (to read)	CV reduplication	bábasahin (will read)
bigáy (give)	Object trigger II	ibigáy(to give)	CV reduplication	ibíbigáy (will give)
bilí (buy)	Locative trigger	bilhán (to buy from)	CV reduplication	bíbilhán (will buy from)
balík (return)	Benefactive trigger	ibalík (to bring back)	CV reduplication	ibábalík (will bring back)
hugas (wash)	Instrumental trigger	ipanghugas (to use for washing)	CV reduplication	ipanghuhugas (will use for washing)
galák (joy)	Reason trigger	ikagalák (to bring joy)	CV reduplication	ikagágalák (will bring joy)

==== Recently Complete (Katatapos) ====
This implies that the action has just been completed before the time of speaking or before a specified time. This aspect is unique in that it does not use the direct case marker ang to mark a focused argument. All nouns bound to a verb in this aspect are only marked by the indirect and oblique markers.

It is often taught that to form this aspect, the first syllable of the word should be reduplicated followed by adding the prefix ka-. In colloquial speech however, the prefix kaka- is used instead without any reduplication. A verb in this aspect is always followed by the particle lang.

Root Word	Formal	Informal
alís (leave)	kaáalís (just left)	kakáalís (just left)
kain (eat)	kakakain (just ate)	
sulat (write)	kasusulat (just wrote)	kakasulat (just wrote)
tulog (sleep)	katutulog (just slept)	kakatulog (just slept)
hingî (ask/request)	kahíhingî (just asked/requested)	kakahingî (just asked/requested)
basa (read)	kababasa (just read)	kakabasa (just read)
bigáy (give)	kabíbigáy (just gave)	kakabigáy (just gave)
bilí (buy)	kabíbilí (just bought)	kakabilí (just bought)
balík (return)	kabábalík (just returned)	kakabalík (just returned)
hugas (wash)	kahuhugas (just washed)	kakahugas (just washed)

=== Mood ===
Tagalog verbs also have affixes expressing grammatical mood; some examples are indicative, potential, social, causative and distributed.

==== Indicative ====
Nagdalá siyá ng liham.
"(S)he brought a letter."

Bumilí kamí ng bigás sa palengke.
"We bought rice in the market."

Kumain akó.
"I ate."

Hindî siyá nagsásalitâ ng Tagalog.
"(S)he does not speak Tagalog."

	Complete	Progressive	Contemplative	Infinitive	Imperative
Actor trigger I	⟨um⟩ bumili	C⟨um⟩V~ bumibili	CV~ bibili	⟨um⟩ bumili	∅ (verb root)bili
Actor trigger II	nag- nagbili	nag-CV~ nagbibili	mag-CV~ magbibili	mag- magbili	pag- pagbili
Actor trigger III	naN- (nang-, nam-, nan-) namili	naN-CV~ namimili	maN-CV~ mamimili	maN- mamili	paN- pamili
Object trigger I	⟨in⟩ binili	C⟨in⟩V~ binibili	CV~ ... -(h)in bibilhin	-(h)in bilhin	-(h)a (or verb root) bilha
Object trigger II	p⟨in⟩ag- pinagbili	p⟨in⟩ag-CV~ pinagbibili	pag-CV~ ... -(h)in pagbibilhin	pag- ... -(h)in pagbilhin	pag- ... -(h)a pagbilha
Object trigger III	p⟨in⟩aN- pinamili	p⟨in⟩aN-CV~ pinamimili	paN-CV~ ... -(h)in pamimilhin	paN- ... -(h)in pamilhin	paN- ... -(h)a pamilha
Locative trigger I	⟨in⟩ ... -(h)an binilhan	C⟨in⟩V~ ... -(h)an binibilhan	CV~ ... -(h)an bibilhan	-(h)an bilhan	-(h)i bilhi
Locative trigger II	p⟨in⟩ag- ... -(h)an pinagbilhan	p⟨in⟩ag-CV~ ... -(h)an pinagbibilhan	pag-CV~ ... -(h)an pagbibilhan	pag- ... -(h)an pagbilhan	pag- ... -(h)i pagbilhi
Locative trigger III	p⟨in⟩aN- ... -(h)an pinamilhan	p⟨in⟩aN-CV~ ... -(h)an pinamimilhan	paN-CV~ ... -(h)an pamimilhan	paN- ... -(h)an pamilhan	paN- ... -(h)i pamilhi
Benefactive trigger I	i⟨in⟩- ibinili	i-C⟨in⟩V~ ibinibili	i-CV~ ibibili	i- ibili	-(h)an bilhan
Benefactive trigger II	ip⟨in⟩ag- ipinagbili	ip⟨in⟩ag-CV~ ipinagbibili	ipag-CV~ ipagbibili	ipag- ipagbili	pag- ... -(h)an pagbilhan
Benefactive trigger III	ip⟨in⟩aN- ipinamili	ip⟨in⟩aN-CV~ ipinamimili	ipaN-CV~ ipamimili	ipaN- ipamili	paN- ... -(h)an pamilhan
Instrumental trigger I	ip⟨in⟩aN- ipinamili	ip⟨in⟩aN-CV~ ipinamimili	ipaN-CV~ ipamimili	ipaN- ipamili	∅
Instrumental trigger I	ip⟨in⟩ampaN- ipinampamili	ip⟨in⟩ampapaN- ipinampapamili	ipampapaN- ipampapamili	ipampaN- ipampamili	∅

==== Causative ====
Nagpadalá siyá ng liham sa kaniyáng iná.
"He sent (literally: caused to be brought) a letter to his mother."

	Complete	Progressive	Contemplative	Infinitive	Imperative
Actor trigger	nagpa- nagpatawad	nagpa-CV~ nagpatatawad	magpa-CV~ magpatatawad	magpa- magpatawad	pagpa- or pa- pagpatawad patawad
Object trigger I	p⟨in⟩a- pinatawad	p⟨in⟩a-CV~ pinatatawad	pa-CV~ ... -(h)in patatawarin	pa- ... -(h)in patawarin	pa- ... -(h)a patawara
Object trigger II	p⟨in⟩agpa- pinagpatawad	p⟨in⟩agpa-CV~ pinagpatatawad	pagpa-CV~ ... -(h)in pagpatatawarin	pagpa- ... -(h)in pagpatawarin	∅
Locative trigger I	p⟨in⟩a- ... -(h)an pinatawaran	p⟨in⟩a-CV~ ... -(h)an pinatatawaran	pa-CV~ ... -(h)an patatawaran	pa- ... -(h)an patawaran	pa- ... -(h)i patawari
Locative trigger II	p⟨in⟩agpa- ... -(h)an pinagpatawaran	p⟨in⟩agpa-CV~ ... -(h)an pinagpatatawaran	pagpa-CV~ ... -(h)an pagpatatawaran	pagpa- ... -(h)an pagpatawaran	∅
Benefactive trigger I	ip⟨in⟩a- ipinatawad	ip⟨in⟩a-CV~ ipinatatawad	ipa-CV~ ipatatawad	ipa- ipatawad	pa- ... -(h)an patawaran
Benefactive trigger II	ip⟨in⟩agpa- ipinagpatawad	ip⟨in⟩agpa-CV~ ipinagpatatawad	ipagpa-CV~ ipagpatatawad	ipagpa- ipagpatawad	∅
Instrumental trigger	ip⟨in⟩ampa- ipinampatawad	ip⟨in⟩ampapa- ipinampapatawad	ipampapa~ ipampapatawad	ipampa- ipampatawad	∅

==== Stative ====
Nagalit ang nanay.
"Mother was angry."

Kinagalitan siya ng maestro niya.
"His teacher reprimanded him."

Ikinalungkot niya ang balita.
"He was saddened by the news."

	Complete	Progressive	Contemplative	Infinitive
Actor trigger I	na- nabuhay	na-CV~ nabubuhay	ma-CV~ mabubuhay	ma- mabuhay
Actor trigger II	nagka- nagkabuhay	nagkaka- nagkakabuhay	magkaka magkakabuhay	magka- magkabuhay
Locative trigger I	k⟨in⟩a- ... -(h)an kinabuhayan	k⟨in⟩a-CV~ ... -(h)an kinabubuhayan	ka-CV~ ... -(h)an kabubuhayan	ka- ... -(h)an kabuhayan
Locative trigger II	p⟨in⟩agka- ... -(h)an pinagkabuhayan	p⟨in⟩agkaka~ ... -(h)an pinagkakabuhayan	pagkaka- ... -(h)an pagkakabuhayan	pagka- ... -(h)an pagkabuhayan
Locative trigger III	k⟨in⟩apaN- ... -(h)an kinapamuhayan	k⟨in⟩apaN~CV ... -(h)an kinapamumuhayan	kapaN-CV~ ... -(h)an kapamumuhayan	kapaN- ... -(h)an kapamuhayan
Reason trigger I	ik⟨in⟩a- ikinabuhay	ik⟨in⟩a~CV ikinabubuhay	ika~CV- ikabubuhay	ika- ikabuhay
Reason trigger II	ip⟨in⟩agka- ipinagkabuhay	ip⟨in⟩agkaka- ipinagkakabuhay	ipagkaka- ipagkakabuhay	ipagka- ipagkabuhay
Reason trigger III	ik⟨in⟩apaN- ikinapamuhay	ik⟨in⟩apaN-CV~ ikinapamumuhay	ikapaN-CV~ ikapamumuhay	ikapaN- ikapamuhay

==== Distributive ====
Distributive verbs is a class of verbs in Tagalog that designates or distributes the action to each of the many actors or objects in the sentence. It is a plural construction but the action is done by each of the individual actors or objects.

Tagalog rarely uses this form now but it is productive in old literature and in the provincial dialects. There are two main distributive categories; manga- and magsi-. Magsi- is much more used today compared to manga-, however, magsi-, or the combined mangagsi-, is mostly used for pag- and mag- affixes while manga- is mostly used for ma-, maka-, maki- affixes.

For manga-, there are no distributive plural forms attested in the undergoer triggers and mostly available for actor triggers - except for potential verbs - while magsi- has attested undergoer pagsi- forms. However, Lope K. Santos in his Balarila ng Wikang Pambansa says that the plural forms in undergoer are mostly the same as pag- -in, ipag-, pagpa- -án but corresponds to -in and pag- -in, i- and ipag-, and pa- and pagpa- -an forms. Also, the root's last syllable will be pronounced in stress even if its original stress is in the penultimate.

Namilí kamí sa palengke.
"We went shopping in the market."

Magsi- and Mangagsi- Class

Indicative	Complete	Progressive	Contemplative	Infinitive
Actor trigger I Type 1	nagsi- nagsibili	nagsisi- nagsisibili	magsisi- magsisibili	magsi- magsibili
Actor trigger I Type 2	nangagsi- nangagsibili	nangagsisi- nangagsisibili	mangagsisi- mangagsisibili	mangagsi- mangagsibili
Actor trigger II Type 1	nagsipag- nagsipagbili	nagsisipag- nagsisipagbili	magsisipag- magsisipagbili	magsipag- magsipagbili
Actor trigger II Type 2	nangagsipag- nangagsipagbili	nangagsisipag- nangagsisipagbili	mangagsisipag- mangagsisipagbili	mangagsipag- mangagsipagbili
Actor trigger III Type 1	nagsipaN- nagsipamili	nagsisipaN- nagsisipamili	magsisipaN- magsisipamili	magsipaN- magsipamili
Actor trigger III Type 2	nangagsipaN- nangagsipamili	nangagsisipaN- nangagsisipamili	mangagsisipaN- mangagsisipamili	mangagsipaN- mangagsipamili
Object trigger	p⟨in⟩agsi- pinagsibili	p⟨in⟩agsisi- pinagsisibili	pagsisi- ... -(h)in pagsisibilhin	pagsi- ... -(h)in pagsibilhin
Locative trigger	p⟨in⟩agsi- ... -(h)an pinagsibilhan	p⟨in⟩agsisi- ... -(h)an pinagsisibilhan	pagsisi- ... -(h)an pagsisibilhan	pagsi- ... -(h)an pagsibilhan
Benefactive trigger	ip⟨in⟩agsi- ipinagsibili	ip⟨in⟩agsisi- ipinagsisibili	ipagsisi- ipagsisibili	ipagsi- ipagsibili

Causative	Complete	Progressive	Contemplative	Infinitive
Actor trigger Type 1	nagsipa- nagsipabili	nagsisipa- nagsisipabili	magsisipa- magsisipabili	magsipa- magsibili
Actor trigger Type 2	nangagsipa- nangagsipabili	nangagsisipa- nangagsisipabili	mangagsisipa- mangagsisipabili	mangagsipa- mangagsipabili
Object trigger	p⟨in⟩agsipa- pinagsipabili	p⟨in⟩agsisipa- pinagsisipabili	pagsisipa- ... -(h)in pagsisipabilhin	pagsipa- ... -(h)in pagsipabilhin
Locative trigger	p⟨in⟩agsipa- ... -(h)an pinagsipabilhan	p⟨in⟩agsisipa- ... -(h)an pinagsisipabilhan	pagsisipa- ... -(h)an pagsisipabilhan	pagsipa- ... -(h)an pagsipabilhan
Benefactive trigger	ip⟨in⟩agsipa- ipinagsipabili	ip⟨in⟩agsisipa- ipinagsisipabili	ipagsisipa- ipagsisipabili	ipagsipa- ipagsipabili

Manga- Class

Indicative	Complete	Progressive	Contemplative	Infinitive
*Actor trigger I	nang- nangbili	nang-CV~ nangbibili	mang-CV~ mangbibili	mang- mangbili
Actor trigger II	nangag- nangagbili	nangag-CV~ nangagbibili	mangag-CV~ mangagbibili	mangag- mangagbili
Actor trigger III	nangaN- nangamili	nangaN-CV~ nangamimili	mangaN-CV~ mangamimili	mangaN- mangamili

Notes:

- Actor trigger I is only used in Marinduque Tagalog.

Causative	Complete	Progressive	Contemplative	Infinitive
Actor trigger II	nangagpa- nangagpabili	nangagpa-CV~ nangagpabibili	mangagpa-CV~ mangagpabibili	mangagpa- mangagpabili

Stative	Complete	Progressive	Contemplative	Infinitive
Actor trigger II	nanga- nangabuhay	nanga-CV~ nangabubuhay	manga-CV~ mangabubuhay	manga- mangabuhay
Actor trigger II	nangagka- nangagkabuhay	nangagkaka- nangagkakabuhay	mangagkaka- mangagkakabuhay	mangagka- mangagkabuhay

Social	Complete	Progressive	Contemplative	Infinitive
Actor trigger I	nangaki- nangakibili	nangakiki- nangakikibili	mangakiki- mangakikibili	mangaki- mangakibili
Actor trigger II	nangakipag- nangakipagbili	nangakikipag- nangakikipagbili	mangakikipag- mangakikipagbili	mangakipag- mangakipagbili
Actor trigger II	nangakipaN- nangakipamili	nangakikipaN- nangakikipamili	mangakikipaN- mangakikipamili	mangakipaN- mangakipamili

Ma- Potential	Complete	Progressive	Contemplative	Infinitive
Object trigger I	nanga- nangabili	nanga-CV~ nangabibili	manga-CV~ mangabibili	manga- mangabili
Object trigger II	nangapag- nangapagbili	nangapag-CV~ nangapagbibili	mangapag-CV~ mangapagbibili	mangapag- mangapagbili
Object trigger III	nangapaN- nangapamili	nangapaN-CV~ nangapamimili	mapaN-CV~ mangapamimili	mangapaN- mangapamili
Locative trigger I	nanga- ... -(h)an nangabilhan	nanga-CV~ ... -(h)an nangabibilhan	manga-CV~ ... -(h)an mangabibilhan	manga- ... -(h)an mangabilhan
Locative trigger II	nangapag- ... -(h)an nangapagbilhan	nangapag-CV~ ... -(h)an nangapagbibilhan	mangapag-CV~ ... -(h)an mangapagbibilhan	mangapag- ... -(h)an mangapagbilhan
Locative trigger III	nangapaN- ... -(h)an nangapamilhan	nangapaN-CV~ ... -(h)an nangapamimilhan	mangapaN-CV~ ... -(h)an mangapamimilhan	mangapaN- ... -(h)an mangapamilhan
Benefactive trigger I	nangai- nangaibili	nangai-CV~ nangaibibili	mangai-CV~ mangaibibili	mangai- mangaibili
Benefactive trigger II	nangaipag- nangaipagbili	nangaipag-CV~ nangaipagbibili	mangaipag-CV~ mangaipagbibili	mangaipag- mangaipagbili
Benefactive trigger III	nangaipaN- nangaipamili	nangaipaN-CV~ nangaipamimili	mangaipaN-CV~ mangaipamimili	mangaipaN- mangaipamili

Maka- Potential	Complete	Progressive	Contemplative	Infinitive
Object trigger I	nangaka- nangakabuhay	nangaka-CV~ nangakabubuhay	mangaka-CV~ mangakabubuhay	mangaka- mangakabuhay
Object trigger II	nangakapag- nangakapagbuhay	nangakapag-CV~ nangakapagbubuhay	mangakapag-CV~ mangakapagbubuhay	mangakapag- mangakapagbuhay
Object trigger III	nangakapaN- nangakapamuhay	nangakapaN-CV~ nangakapamumuhay	mangakapaN-CV~ mangakapamumuhay	mangakapaN- mangakapamuhay
Locative trigger I	nangaka- ... -(h)an nangakabuhayan	nangaka-CV~ ... -(h)an nangakabubuhayan	mangaka-CV~ ... -(h)an mangakakabuhayan	mangaka- ... -(h)an mangakabuhayan
Locative trigger II	nangakapag- ... -(h)an nangakapagbuhayan	nangakapag-CV~ ... -(h)an nangakapagbubuhayan	mangakapag-CV~ ... -(h)an mangakapagbubuhayan	mangakapag- ... -(h)an mangakapagbuhayan
Locative trigger III	nangakapaN- ... -(h)an nangakapamuhayan	nangakapaN-CV~ ... -(h)an nangakapamumuhayan	mangakapaN-CV~ ... -(h)an mangakapamumuhayan	mangakapaN- ... -(h)an mangakapamuhayan

==== Social ====
Nakikain akó sa mga kaibigan ko.
"I ate with my friends."

	Complete	Progressive	Contemplative	Infinitive
Actor trigger I	naki- nakiaral	nakiki- nakikiaral	makiki- makikiaral	maki- makiaral
Actor trigger II	nakipag- nakipag-aral	nakikipag- nakikipag-aral	makikipag- makikipag-aral	makipag- makipag-aral
Actor trigger III	nakipaN- nakipangaral	nakikipaN- nakikipangaral	makikipaN~ makikipangaral	makipaN- makipangaral
Locative trigger I	p⟨in⟩aki- ... -(h)an pinakiaralan	p⟨in⟩akiki- ... -(h)an pinakikiaralan	pakiki- ... -(h)an pakikiaralan	paki- ... -(h)an pakiaralan
Locative trigger II	p⟨in⟩kipag- ... -(h)an pinakipag-aralan	p⟨in⟩kikipag- ... -(h)an pinakikipag-aralan	pagkikipag- ... -(h)an pakikipag-aralan	pakipag- ... -(h)an pakipag-aralan
Locative trigger III	p⟨in⟩kipaN- ... -(h)an pinakipangaralan	p⟨in⟩kikipaN- ... -(h)an pinakikipangaralan	pakikipaN- ... -(h)an pakikipangaralan	pakipaN- ... -(h)an pakipangaralan
Benefactive trigger I	ip⟨in⟩aki- ipinakiaral	ip⟨in⟩akiki~ ipinakikiaral	ipakiki- ipakikiaral	ipaki- ipakiaral
Benefactive trigger II	ip⟨in⟩kipag- ipinakipag-aral	ip⟨in⟩kikipag- ipinakikipag-aral	ipakikipag- ipakikipag-aral	ipakipag- ipakipag-aral
Benefactive trigger III	ip⟨in⟩akipaN- ipinakipangaral	ip⟨in⟩akikipaN- ipinakikipangaral	ipakikipaN- ipakikipangaral	ipakipaN- ipakipangaral

==== Potential ====
Hindî siyá nakapagsásalitâ ng Tagalog.
"(S)he was not able to speak Tagalog."

Ma- Potential Verbs

	Complete	Progressive	Contemplative	Infinitive
Object trigger I	na- nabili	na-CV~ nabibili	ma-CV~ mabibili	ma- mabili
Object trigger II	napag- napagbili	napag-CV~ napagbibili	mapag-CV~ mapagbibili	mapag- mapagbili
Object trigger III	napaN- napamili	napaN-CV~ napamimili	mapaN-CV~ mapamimili	mapaN- mapamili
Locative trigger I	na- ... -(h)an nabilhan	na-CV~ ... -(h)an nabibilhan	ma-CV~ ... -(h)an mabibilhan	ma- ... -(h)an mabilhan
Locative trigger II	napag- ... -(h)an napagbilhan	napag-CV~ ... -(h)an napagbibilhan	mapag-CV~ ... -(h)an mapagbibilhan	mapag- ... -(h)an mapagbilhan
Locative trigger III	napaN- ... -(h)an napamilhan	napaN-CV~ ... -(h)an napamimilhan	mapaN-CV~ ... -(h)an mapamimilhan	mapaN- ... -(h)an mapamilhan
Benefactive trigger I	nai- naibili	nai-CV~ naibibili	mai-CV~ maibibili	mai- maibili
Benefactive trigger II	naipag- naipagbili	naipag-CV~ naipagbibili	maipag-CV~ maipagbibili	maipag- maipagbili
Benefactive trigger III	naipaN- naipamili	naipaN-CV~ naipamimili	maipaN-CV~ maipamimili	maipaN- maipamili
Instrumental trigger I	naipaN- naipambili	naipaN-CV~ naipambibili	maipaN-CV~ maipambibili	maipaN- maipambili
Instrumental trigger II	naipampaN- naipampamili	naipampapaN- naipampapamili	maipampapaN maipampapamili	maipampaN- maipampamili

Maka- Potential Verbs

	Complete	Progressive	Contemplative	Infinitive
Object trigger I	naka- nakabuhay	naka-CV~ nakabubuhay	maka-CV~ makabubuhay	maka- makabuhay
Object trigger II	nakapag- nakapagbuhay	nakapag-CV~ nakapagbubuhay	makapag-CV~ makapagbubuhay	makapag- makapagbuhay
Object trigger III	nakapaN- nakapamuhay	nakapaN-CV~ nakapamumuhay	makapaN-CV~ makapamumuhay	makapaN- makapamuhay
Locative trigger I	naka- ... -(h)an nakabuhayan	naka-CV~ ... -(h)an nakabubuhayan	makaCV~ ... -(h)an makakabuhayan	maka- ... -(h)an makabuhayan
Locative trigger II	nakapag- ... -(h)an nakapagbuhayan	nakapag-CV~ ... -(h)an nakapagbubuhayan	makapag-CV~ ... -(h)an makapagbubuhayan	makapag- ... -(h)an makapagbuhayan
Locative trigger III	nakapaN- ... -(h)an nakapamuhayan	nakapaN-CV~ ... -(h)an nakapamumuhayan	makapaN-CV~ ... -(h)an makapamumuhayan	makapaN- ... -(h)an makapamuhayan
Benefactive trigger I	naika- naikabuhay	naika-CV~ naikabubuhay	maika-CV~ maikabubuhay	maika- maikabuhay
Benefactive trigger II	naikapag- naikapagbuhay	naikapag-CV~ naikapagbubuhay	maikapag-CV~ maikapagbubuhay	maikapag- maikapagbuhay
Benefactive trigger III	naikapaN- naikapamuhay	naikapaN-CV~ naikapamumuhay	maikapaN-CV~ maikapamumuhay	maikapaN- maikapamuhay

=== Other Verb Forms ===
There are other verb forms in Tagalog having unique semantic functions. Many of these are becoming obsolete or rarely used outside literature.

==== Reciprocal ====
Reciprocal verbs are verbs entailing that an action is mutually done or simultaneously done on each other by two or more actors or objects. In Tagalog, aside from the reciprocity function, it could also have a function of plurality.

This is generally marked by mag- -an affix and its other forms.

	Complete	Progressive	Contemplative	Infinitive
Indicative	nag- ... -(h)an naghalikan	nag-CV~ ... -(h)an naghahalikan	mag-CV~ ... -(h)an maghahalikan	mag- ... -(h)an maghalikan
Causative	nagpa- ... -(h)an nagpatawaran	nagpapa- ... -(h)an nagpapatawaran	magpapa- ... -(h)an magpapatawaran	magpa- ... -(h)an magpatawaran
Potential	nagka- ... -(h)an nagkasakitan	nagkaka- ... -(h)an nagkakasakitan	magkaka- ... -(h)an magkakasakitan	magka- ... -(h)an magkasakitan
Social I	naki- ... -(h)an nakitaniman	nakiki- ... -(h)an nakikitaniman	makiki- ... -(h)an makikitaniman	maki- ... -(h)an makitaniman
Social II	nakipag- ... -(h)an nakipaghalikan	nakikipag- ... -(h)an nakikipaghalikan	makikipag- ... -(h)an makikipaghalikan	makipag- ... -(h)an makipaghalikan
Intensive	nag- -um- -(h)an nagsumigawan	nag- -Cu- -(h)an nagsusumigawan	mag- -Cu- -(h)an magsusumigawan	mag- -um- -(h)an magsusumigawan
Frequentative	nag-CV~ ... -(h)an nagtátakbúhan	nag-CVCV~ ... -(h)an nagtátatakbúhan	mag-CVCV~ ... -(h)an magtátatakbúhan	mag-CV~ ... -(h)an magtátakbuhan

Marinduque Tagalog uses a special form of mag- -in- -(h)an similar to some Visayan languages.

==== Translative or Magsa- Verbs ====
This paradigm is the verb form of the oblique noun case article sa. It entails the meaning that an action is moving towards a direction, location, actor or object. Though rarely used today, some forms are used in expressions and is very productive in old literature.

	Complete	Progressive	Contemplative	Infinitive
Actor trigger I	suma- sumalangit	sumasa- sumasalangit	sasa- sasalangit	suma- sumalangit
Actor trigger II	nagsa- nagsagawa	nagsasa- nagsasagawa	magsasa- magsasagawa	magsa- magsagawa
Object trigger I	sina- sinakastila	sinasa- sinasakastila	sasa- ... -(h)in sasakastilain	sa- ... -(h)in sakastilain
Object trigger II	pinagsa- pinagsagawa	pinagsasa- pinagsasagawa	pagsasa- ... -(h)in pagsasagawain	pagsa- ... -(h)in pagsagawain
Locative trigger I	sina- ... -(h)an sinagawaan	sinasa- ... -(h)an sinasagawaan	sasa- ... -(h)an sasagawaan	sa- ... -(h)an sagawaan
Locative trigger II	pinagsa- ... -(h)an pinagsagawaan	pinagsasa- ... -(h)an pinagsasagawaan	pagsasa- ... -(h)an pagsasagawaan	pagsa- ... -(h)an pagsagawaan
Benefactive trigger I	isina- isinagawa	isinasa- isinasagawa	isasa- isasagawa	isa- isagawa
Benefactive trigger II	ipinagsa- ipinagsagawa	ipinagsasa- ipinagsasagawa	ipagsasa- ipagsasagawa	ipagsa- ipagsagawa

==== Intensive ====
This construction is a good example of stacking in Tagalog. The actor trigger infix -um- can be inserted in a root that already took mag-, resulting in a meaning wherein the action is more "intense" in its execution.

	Complete	Progressive	Contemplative	Infinitive
Actor trigger	nag- -um- nagsumikap	nag- -Cu- nagsusumikap	mag- -Cu- magsusumikap	mag- -um- magsumikap
Object trigger	pinag- -um- pinagsumikap	pinag- -Cu- pinagsusumikap	pag- -Cu- -(h)in pagsusumikapin	pag- -um- -(h)in pagsumikapin
Locative trigger	pinag- -um- -(h)an pinagsumikapan	pinag- -Cu- -(h)an pinagsusumikapan	pag- -Cu -(h)an pagsusumikapan	pag- -um- -(h)an pagsumikapan
Benefactive trigger	ipinag- -um- ipinagsumikap	ipinag- -Cu- ipinagsusumikap	ipag- -Cu- ipagsusumikap	ipag- -um- ipagsumikap

== Nouns ==
While Tagalog nouns are not inflected, they are usually preceded by case-marking particles. These follow an Austronesian alignment, also known as a trigger system, which is a distinct feature of Austronesian languages. There are three basic cases: direct (ang/si); indirect (ng/ni); and oblique (sa/kay).

The direct case marks the noun which has a special relation to the verb in the clause. Here, it is the verb's trigger that determines what semantic role (agent, patient, etc.) the noun is in. The indirect case marks the agent or patient, or both, that isn't marked with the direct case in the clause. The oblique case marks the location, beneficiary, instrument, and any other oblique argument that isn't marked with the direct case.

In clauses using the actor trigger, the direct case would mark the agent of the verb (corresponding to the subject in the English active voice), the indirect would mark the patient (direct object), while any other argument would be marked by the oblique case. In the object trigger, the reverse occurs, wherein the direct would mark the patient and the indirect marking the agent. When other verb triggers are used (i.e., locative, beneficiary, instrumental, causal triggers), both agent and patient would be marked by the indirect case, the focused oblique argument marked with the direct case, and any other argument by the oblique case.

One of the functions of trigger in Tagalog is to code definiteness, analogous to the use of definite and indefinite articles (i.e., the & a) in English. That said, an argument marked with the direct case is always definite. Whereas, when a patient argument is marked with the indirect case, it is generally indefinite, but an agent argument marked with the same indirect case would be understood as definite. To make it indefinite, the numeral isá (one) is used.

	Sentence 1 (AF)	Sentence 2 (OF)	Sentence 3 (OF)	Sentence 4 (OF)	Sentence 5 (AF)
Tagalog	kumain ang pusà ng isdâ	kinain ng pusa ang isdâ	kinain ng isáng pusà ang isdâ	kinain ng isáng pusà ang isáng isdâ	kumain ang isáng pusà ng isáng isdâ
English	the cat ate a fish	the cat ate the fish	a cat ate the fish	a cat ate a fish	a cat ate a fish

The indirect particle is also used as a genitive marker. It is for this reason that Tagalog lean more towards a VOS word order, as an indirect (ng/ni) argument directly following a direct (ang/si) argument might be misinterpreted as a possessive construction. For instance with the sentence above, kumain ang pusà ng isdâ may be read as "the cat of the fish ate".

The oblique particle and the locative derived from it are similar to prepositions in English, marking things such as location and direction.

The case particles fall into two classes: one used with names of people (proper) and one for everything else (common).

The common indirect marker is spelled ng and pronounced [naŋ]. Mgá, pronounced [maˈŋa], marks the common plural.

Tagalog has associative plural in addition to additive plural.

=== Cases ===
		Direct (ang)	Indirect (ng)	Oblique (sa)
Common	singular	ang, 'yung (iyong)	ng, nu'ng (niyong)	sa
Common	plural	ang mgá, 'yung mgá (iyong mgá)	ng mgá, nu'ng mgá (niyong mgá)	sa mgá
Personal	singular	si	ni	kay
Personal	plural	sina	nina	kina

=== Common noun affixes ===
ka-	indicating a companion or colleague
ka- -(h)an	collective or abstract noun
pan-, pam-, pang-	denoting instrumental use of the noun

=== Examples ===
Dumatíng ang lalaki.
{(has) arrived} the man
"The man arrived."

Nakita {ni Juan} {si María.}
saw {by (the) Juan} {(the) María}
"Juan saw María."

Note that in Tagalog, even proper nouns require a case marker.

Pupunta siná Elena at Roberto sa bahay ni Miguel.
{will go} PL.NOM.ART Elena and Roberto at house of Miguel
"Elena and Roberto will go to Miguel's house."

Nasaan {ang mga} libró?
Where the.PL book
"Where are the books?"

{Na kay} Tatay ang susì.
{Is with} Father the key
"Father has the key."

Malusóg ang sanggól niyó.
Healthy (the) baby your(plural)
"Your baby is healthy."

Para kina Luis ang handaan..
For the.PL Luis the party
"The party is for Luis and the others."
CC BY 4.0 WALS

== Pronouns ==
Like nouns, personal pronouns are categorized by case. As above, the indirect forms also function as the genitive.

			Direct (ang)	Indirect (ng)	Oblique (sa)
1st person	singular		akó	ko (nakin)	akin
1st person	dual		kitá/kata	nita/nata (ta)	kanitá/kanata (ata)
1st person	plural	inclusive	tayo	natin	atin
1st person	plural	exclusive	kamí	namin	amin
2nd person	singular		ikáw (ka)	mo (niyo)	iyó
2nd person	plural		kayó	ninyó	inyó
3rd person	singular		siyá	niyá	kaniyá
3rd person	plural		silá	nilá	kanilá

	Direct second person (ang) with Indirect (ng) first person
(to) you by/from me	kitá

Pronoun sequences are ko ikáw (kitá), ko kayó, ko siyá, and ko silá.

Examples:
Sumulat akó.
"I wrote."

Sinulatan akó ng liham.
"He/She/They wrote me a letter."
Note: If "ng liham" is removed from the sentence, it becomes "I was written on"

Ibíbigay ko ito sa kaniyá.
"I will give this to him/her/them."

Genitive pronouns follow the word they modify. Oblique pronouns can take the place of the genitive pronoun but they precede the word they modify.

Ang bahay ko.
Ang aking bahay.
"My house."

The inclusive dual pronoun kata/kitá has largely disappeared from the Manila Dialect. It survives in other Tagalog dialects, particularly those spoken in the rural areas. However kitá is used to replace the pronoun sequence [verb] ko ikaw, (I [verb] you).

The 1st–2nd dual pronoun "kata/kitá" referring to "you and I" is traditionally used as follows:

Mágkaibigan kitá. (Manila Dialect: Mágkaibigan tayo.)
"You and I are friends." (Manila Dialect: "We are friends.")

Examples:

Mágkásintahan kitá.(We are lovers.)

Maayós áng bahay nita. (Our house is fixed.)

Magagandá áng mgá paróroonan sá kanitá. (The destinations are beautiful at ours.)

As previously mentioned, the pronoun sequence [verb] ko ikáw, (I [verb] you) may be replaced by kitá.

Mahál kitá.
"I love you."

Bíbigyan kitá ng pera.
"I will give you money."

Nakità kitá sa tindahan kahapon.
"I saw you at the store yesterday."

Kaibigan kitá.
"You are my friend."

The inclusive pronoun tayo refers to the first and second persons. It may also refer to a third person(s).

The exclusive pronoun kamí refers to the first and third persons but excludes the second.

Walâ tayong bigás.
"We (you and me) have no rice."

Walâ kaming bigás.
"We (someone else and me, but not you) have no rice."

The second person singular has two forms. Ikáw is the non-enclitic form while ka is the enclitic which never begins a sentence. The plural form kayó is also used politely in the singular, similar to French vous.

Native nouns are genderless, hence siyá means he, she, or they (singular).

=== Polite or formal usage ===
Tagalog, like many languages, marks the T–V distinction: when addressing a single person in polite/formal/respectful settings, pronouns from either the 2nd person plural or the 3rd person plural group are used instead of the singular 2nd person pronoun. They can be used with, or in lieu of, the pô/hô iterations without losing any degree of politeness, formality, or respect:

- ikáw or ka ("you" sgl.) becomes kayó ("you" pl.) or silá ("they")
- mo (post-substantive "your") becomes niyó or ninyó (more polite), (post-substantive "your" pl.) or nilá (post-substantive "their")
- iyó(ng) ("yours" sgl. or pre-substantive "your" sgl.) becomes inyó(ng) ("yours" pl. or pre-substantive "your" pl.) or kanilá(ng) ("theirs" or pre-substantive "their")

Example:
English: "What's your name?"
Casual: Anó'ng pangalan mo?
Respectful: Anó'ng pangalan ninyo? or Anó'ng pangalan nilá?

Using such pluralized pronouns is quite sufficient for expressing politeness, formality or respect, particularly when an affirmative (or negative) pô/hô iteration isn't necessary.

Additionally, the formal second-person pronouns Ikáw (Ka), Kayó, Mo, and Ninyó, third-person forms Niyá and Siyá, and their oblique forms Inyó, Iyó, and Kaniyá are, by custom, reverentially capitalized in religious contexts. Purists frame this capitalization as nonstandard and inconsistent and do not apply it in written form.

=== Demonstrative pronouns ===
Tagalog's demonstrative pronouns are as follows.

	Direct (ang)	Indirect (ng)	Oblique (sa)	Locative (nasa)	Existential	Manner (gaya)
Nearest to speaker (this, here)*	irí, arí	mirí	dini/rini	nandini(andini)/nárini	eré	ganirí
Near speaker and addressee (this, here)	itó	nitó	díto/ríto	nandíto(andíto)/nárito	éto/héto	ganitó
Nearest addressee (that, there)	iyán	niyán	diyán/riyán	nandiyán(andíyan)/náriyan	ayán/hayán	ganiyán
Remote (that, there)	iyón, yaón	niyón	doón/roón	nandoón(andoón)/nároon	ayón/hayón	ganoón (gayón/ganó'n)/ garoón

Notes:

- * Although irí/arí and itó both mean "this" and dini/rini and dito/rito are "here" , their difference is the first one pertains to the speaker only while the second one includes the addressee. This distinction is lost in standard Tagalog, where itó and dito is used in all cases, but survives in provincial dialects like Batangas Tagalog. The same goes for their respective locative, existential, and manner forms.
- Yaón is an archaic word which means that. The modern word is iyón.
- The oblique are verbs and locative are pseudo-verbs; for instance, dumito, dumirito, and dirito for oblique; and narito, naririto, and nandito for oblique. However, some of these are considered archaic in standard Tagalog.
- Words like pariní, paritó, pariyan, and paroón are combined with pa-(oblique word). Some of these are considered archaic in standard Tagalog but remains in use in dialects.
- The contractions are: 're, 'to, 'yan, 'yun, n'yan, gan'to, gan'yan, gan're, gano'n (gayon)

Examples:

Anó itó?
"What's this?"

Sino ang lalaking iyón?
"Who is that man?"

Gáling kay Pedro ang liham na itó.
"This letter is from Pedro."

Nandito akó.
"I am here."

Kakain silá roón.
"They will eat there."

Saán ka man naróroon.
"Wherever you are."

Kumain niyán ang batà.
"The child ate some of that."

Ayón palá ang salamín mo!
"So that's where your glasses are!"

Heto isáng regalo para sa iyó.
"Here's a gift for you."

== Adjectives ==
Just like English adjectives, Tagalog adjectives modify a noun or a pronoun.

=== Forms ===
==== Simple (Payák) ====
These consist of only the root word.

Examples: hinóg (ripe), sabog (exploded), ganda (beautiful)

==== Affixed (Maylapì) ====
These consist of the root word and one or more affixes.

Examples: tinanóng (questioned), kumakain (eating), nagmámahál (loving)

==== Repeating (Inuulit) ====
These are formed by the repetition of the whole or part of the root word.

Examples: puláng-pulá (really red), putíng-putî (really white), araw-araw (every day), gabí-gabí (every night)

==== Compound (Tambalan) ====
These are compound words.

Examples: ngiting-aso (literally: "dog smile", meaning: "big smile"), balát-sibuyas (literally: "onion-skinned", meaning: "crybaby")

=== Types ===
==== Descriptive (Panlarawan) ====
This states the size, color, form, smell, sound, texture, taste, and shape.

Examples: muntî (little), biluhabà (oval), matamis (sweet), malubhâ (serious)

==== Proper (Pantangì) ====
This states a specific noun. This consists of a common noun and a proper noun. The proper noun (that starts with a capital letter) is modifying the type of common noun.

Examples: wikang Ingles (English language), kulturang Espanyol (Spanish culture), pagkaing Iloko (Ilokano food)

==== Pamilang ====
This states the number, how many, or a position in order. This has multiple types.

- Sequence (Panunurán) – This states the position in an order. Examples: ikatló (third), una (first), pangalawá (second)
- Quantitative (Patakarán) – This states the actual number. Examples: isa (one), apat (four), limang libo (five thousand)
- Fraction (Pamahagì) – This states a part of a whole. Examples: kalahatì (half), limáng-kawaló (five-eights), sangkapat (fourth)
- Monetary (Pahalagá) – This states a price (equivalent to money) of a thing or any bought item. Examples: piso (one peso), limampung sentimo (fifty centavos), sandaang piso (one hundred pesos)
- Collective (Palansák) – This states a group of people or things. This identifies the number that forms that group. Examples: dalawahan (by two), sampú-sampû (by ten), animan (by six)
- Patakdâ – This states the exact and actual number. This cannot be added or subtracted. Examples: iisa (only one), dadalawa (only two), lilima (only five)

=== Degrees of Comparison ===
Just like English adjectives, Tagalog adjectives have 3 degrees of comparison.

==== Positive (Lantáy) ====
This only compares one noun/pronoun.

Example: maliít (small), kupas (peeled), matabâ (fat)

==== Comparative (Pahambíng) ====
This is used when 2 nouns/pronouns are being compared. This has multiple types.

- Similar (Magkatulad) – This is the comparison when the traits compared are fair. Usually, the prefixes ga-, sing-/kasíng-, and magsing-/magkasíng- are used.
- Dissimilar (Di-magkatulad) – This is the comparison if it shows the idea of disallowance, rejection or opposition.
  - Palamáng – the thing that is being compared has a positive trait. The words "higít", "lalo", "mas", "di-hamak" and others are used.
  - Pasahol – the thing that is being compared has a negative trait. The words "di-gaano", "di-gasino", "di-masyado" and others are used.

==== Superlative (Pasukdól) ====
This is the highest degree of comparison. This can be positive or negative. The prefix "pinaká" and the words "sobra", "ubod", "tunay", "talaga", "saksakan", and "hari ng ___" are used, as well as the repetition of the adjective.

Positive (Lantay)	Comparative (Pahambing)			Superlative (Pasukdol)
Positive (Lantay)	Similar (Magkatulad)	Dissimilar (Di-magkatulad)		Superlative (Pasukdol)
Positive (Lantay)	Similar (Magkatulad)	Palamáng	Pasahol	Superlative (Pasukdol)
pangit (ugly)	kasíng-pangit (as ugly as)	higít na pangit (uglier)	di-gaanong pangit (not that ugly)	pinakapangit (ugliest)
magandá (beautiful)	singgandá (as beautiful as)	mas magandá (more beautiful)	di-masyadong magandá (not that beautiful)	ubod ng gandá (most beautiful)
mabangó (fragrant)	magkasíng-bangó (as fragrant as)	lalong mabangó (more fragrant)	di-gasinong mabangó (not that fragrant)	tunay na mabangó (most fragrant)

=== Degrees of Description ===
These degrees have no comparison.

==== Lantáy ====
This is when the simple/plain form of the adjective is being used for description.

Examples: matalino (smart), palatawá (risible)

==== Katamtaman ====
This is when the adjective is accompanied by the words "medyo", "nang kauntî", "nang bahagyâ" or the repetition of the root word or the first two syllables of the root word.

Examples: medyo matabâ (somewhat fat), malakás nang bahagyâ (slightly strong), malakás-lakás (somewhat strong), matabáng nang kauntî (a little bit insipid)

==== Masidhî ====
This is when the adjective is accompanied by the words "napaka", "ubod ng", "saksakan ng", "talagáng", "sobrang", "masyadong" or the repetition of the whole adjective. The description in this degree is intense.

Examples: napakalakas (so strong), ubod ng baít (really kind), talagáng mabangó (truly fragrant), sobrang makinis (oversmooth)

=== Number ===
There are rules that are followed when forming adjectives that use the prefix "ma-".

==== Singular (Isahan) ====
When the adjective is describing only one noun/pronoun, "ma-" and the root word is used.

Examples: masayá (happy), malungkót (sad)

==== Plural (Maramihan) ====
When the adjective is describing two or more noun/pronoun, "ma-" is used and the first syllable or first two letters of the root word is repeated.

Examples: maliliít (small), magagandá (beautiful)

The word "mgá" is not needed if the noun/pronoun is right next to the adjective.

Example: Ang magagandáng damít ay kasya kiná Erica at Bel. (The beautiful clothes can fit to Erica and Bel.)

== Ligature ==
The ligature (pang-angkóp) connects, or links, modifiers (like adjectives and adverbs) to the words that they are modifying. It has two allomorphs:

na

This is used if the preceding word ends with a consonant other than n. It is not combined with the preceding word but separated, appearing between the modifier and the word it modifies.

Example: mapágmahál na tao ("loving person")

-ng

This suffixed allomorph is used if the preceding word ends with a vowel or n; in the latter case, the final n is lost and replaced by the suffix:

Examples: mabuting nilaláng ng Diyos ("good creation of God"); huwarang mamámayán (huwaran + mamámayán) ("ideal citizen")

== Conjunctions ==
Tagalog uses numerous conjunctions, and may belong to one of these possible functions:

1. separate non-contrasting ideas (e.g. at "and")
2. separate contrasting ideas (e.g. ngunit "but")
3. give explanations (e.g. kung "if")
4. provide circumstances (e.g. kapág "when")
5. indicate similarities (e.g. kung saán "where")
6. provide reasons (e.g. dahil "because")
7. indicate endings (e.g. upang "[in order] to")

== Modifiers ==
Modifiers alter, qualify, clarify, or limit other elements in a sentence structure. They are optional grammatical elements but they change the meaning of the element they are modifying in particular ways. Examples of modifiers are adjectives (modifies nouns), adjectival clauses, adverbs (modifies verbs), and adverbial clauses. Nouns can also modify other nouns. In Tagalog, word categories are fluid: A word can sometimes be an adverb or an adjective depending on the word it modifies. If the word being modified is a noun, then the modifier is an adjective, if the word being modified is a verb, then it is an adverb. For example, the word 'mabilís' means 'fast' in English. The Tagalog word 'mabilís' can be used to describe nouns like 'kuneho' ('rabbit') in 'kunehong mabilís' ('quick rabbit'). In that phrase, 'mabilís' was used as an adjective. The same word can be used to describe verbs, one can say 'tumakbo nang mabilís' which means 'quickly ran'. In that phrase, 'mabilis' was used as an adverb. The Tagalog word for 'rabbit' is 'kuneho' and 'ran' is 'tumakbo' but they showed up in the phrases as 'kuneho-ng' and 'tumakbó nang'. Tagalog uses something called a "linker" that always surfaces in the context of modification. Modification only occurs when a linker is present. Tagalog has the linkers -ng and na. In the examples mentioned, the linker -ng was used because the word before the linker ends in a vowel. The second linker, na is used everywhere else (the na used in modification is not the same as the adverb na which means 'now' or 'already'). Seeing the enclitics -ng and na are good indications that there is modification in the clause. These linkers can appear before or after the modifier.

The following table summarizes the distribution of the linker:

Required	Prohibited
Attributive Adjective	Predicative Adjective
Adverbial modifier	Predicative Adverbial
Nominal Modifier	Predicative Nominal
Relative Clause	Matrix Clause

=== Sequence of modifiers in a noun phrase ===
The following tables show a possible word order of a noun phrase containing a modifier. Since word order is flexible in Tagalog, there are other possible ways in which one could say these phrases. To read more on Tagalog word order, head to the Word Order section.

	Marker	Possessive	Quantity	Verbal Phrase	Adjectives	Noun	Head Noun
Example	ang	kaniyáng	apat na	piniritong	mahabang	Vigang	lumpiâ
Gloss	the	her	four	fried	long	Vegan	spring roll
Translation	her four fried, long Vegan spring rolls						
Example	iyáng	inyóng	limáng kahóng	binasag ng batang	putíng	Intsík na	pinggán
Gloss	those	your	five boxes	that the children broke	white	Chinese	plates
Translation	those five boxes of yours of white Chinese plates that the children broke						

== Enclitic particles ==
Tagalog has enclitic particles that have important information conveying different nuances in meaning. Below is a list of Tagalog's enclitic particles.

1. na and pa
  - na: now, already
  - pa: still, else, in addition, yet
2. man, kahit: even, even if, even though
3. bagamán: although
4. ngâ: indeed; used to affirm or to emphasise. Also softens imperatives.
5. din (after a vowel: rin): too, also
6. lamang (contracted as lang): limiting particle; only or just
7. daw (after a vowel: raw): a reporting particle that indicates the preceding information as secondhand; they say, he said, reportedly, supposedly, etc.
8. pô (less respectful form: hô): marker indicating politeness.
9. ba: used to end yes-and-no questions and optionally in other types of questions, similar to Japanese -ka and Chinese ma (嗎), but not entirely.
10. muna: for now, for a minute, and yet (when answering in the negative).
11. namán: used in making contrasts; softens requests; emphasis
12. kasí: expresses cause; because
13. kayâ: expresses wonder; I wonder; perhaps (we should do something); also optionally used in yes-and-no questions and other forms of questions
14. palá: expresses that the speaker has realized or suddenly remembered something; realization particle; apparently
15. yatà (contracted as/informal: atà): expresses uncertainty; probably, perhaps, seems
16. tulóy: used in cause and effect; as a result
17. sana: expresses hope, unrealized condition (with the verb in completed aspect), used in conditional sentences.

The order listed above is the order in which the particles follow if they are used in conjunction with each other. A more concise list of the orders of monosyllabic particles from Rubino (2002) is given below.

1. na / pa
2. ngâ
3. din ~ rin
4. daw ~ raw
5. pô / hô
6. ba

The particles na and pa cannot be used in conjunction with each other as well as pô and hô.

- Dumatíng na raw palá ang lola mo.

"Oh yes, your grandmother has apparently arrived."

- Palitán mo na rin.

"Do change it as well."

Note for "daw/raw and rin/din": If the preceding letter is a consonant except y and w, the letter d is used in any word, vice versa for r e.g., pagdárasal, instead of pagdádasal

Although in everyday speech, this rule is often ignored.

- Walâ pa yatang asawa ang kapatíd niyá.

"Perhaps his brother still hasn’t a wife."

- Itó lang kayâ ang ibibigáy nilá sa amin?

"I wonder, is the only thing that they'll be giving us?"

- Nag-aral ka na ba ng wikang Kastilà?

"Have you already studied the Spanish language?"

- Batà pa kasí.

"He's still young, is why."

- Pakisulat mo ngâ muna ang iyóng pangalan dito.

"Please, do write your name here first."

The words daw and raw, which mean “he said”/“she said”/“they said”, are sometimes joined to the real translations of “he said”/”she said”, which is sabi niyá, and “they said”, which is sabi nilá. They are also joined to the Tagalog of “you said”, which is sabi mo. But this time, both daw and raw mean “supposedly/reportedly”.

- Sabi raw niyá. / Sabi daw niyá.

"He/she supposedly said."

- Sabi raw nilá. / Sabi daw nilá.

"They supposedly said."

- Sabi mo raw. / Sabi mo daw.

"You supposedly said."

Although the word kasí is a native Tagalog word for “because” and not slang, it is still not used in formal writing. The Tagalog word for this is sapagká’t or sapagkát. Thus, the formal form of Batà pa kasí is Sapagká’t batà pa or Sapagkát batà pa. This is sometimes shortened to pagká’t or pagkát, so Sapagká’t batà pa is also written as Pagká’t batà pa or Pagkát batà pa. In both formal and everyday writing and speech, dahil sa (the oblique form of kasí; thus, its exact translation is “because of”) is also synonymous to sapagká’t (sapagkát), so the substitute of Sapagká’t batà pa for Batà pa kasí is Dahil sa batà pa. Most of the time in speech and writing (mostly every day and sometimes formal), dahil sa as the Tagalog of “because” is reduced to dahil, so Dahil sa batà pa is spoken simply as Dahil batà pa.

== Word order ==
Tagalog has a flexible word order compared to English. While the verb always remains in the initial position, the order of noun phrase complements that follows is flexible. An example provided by Schacter and Otanes can be seen in (1).

Nagbigáy ng=libró sa=babae ang=lalaki
gave GEN=book DAT=woman NOM=man
The man gave the woman a book.

The flexibility of Tagalog word order can be seen in (2). There are six different ways of saying 'The man gave the woman a book.' in Tagalog. The following five sentences, along with the sentence from (1), include the same grammatical components and are all grammatical and identical in meaning but have different orders.

English: The man gave the woman a book.
(2) (Kroeger, 1991: 136 (2))	Nagbigáy ng=libró ang=lalaki sa=babae gave GEN=book NOM=man DAT=woman Nagbigáy sa=babae ng=libró ang=lalaki gave DAT=woman GEN=book NOM=man Nagbigáy sa=babae ang=lalaki ng=libró gave DAT=woman NOM=man GEN=book Nagbigáy ang=lalaki sa=babae ng=libró gave NOM=man DAT=woman GEN=book Nagbigáy ang=lalaki ng=libró sa=babae gave NOM=man GEN=book DAT=woman

The principles in (3) help to determine the ordering of possible noun phrase complements. In a basic clause where the patient takes the nominative case, principles (i) and (ii) requires the actor to precede the patient. In example (4a), the patient, 'liham' (letter) takes the nominative case and satisfies principles (i) and (ii). The example in (4b) shows that the opposite ordering of the agent and patient does not result in an ungrammatical sentence but rather an unnatural one in Tagalog.

(3) (Kroeger, 1991: 137 (3))	(i) Actor phrase tends to precede all other arguments
(3) (Kroeger, 1991: 137 (3))	(ii) Noun phrase which bears nominative case tends to follow all other arguments
(3) (Kroeger, 1991: 137 (3))	(iii) "Heavier" noun phrases tend to follow "lighter" noun phrases

Sinulat ni=Juan ang=liham.
PERF=write GEN=John NOM=letter
John wrote the letter.

?Sinulat ang=liham ni=Juan
PERF=write NOM=letter GEN=John
John wrote the letter.

In example (5), the verb, 'binihag', (captivated) is marked for active voice and results in the actor ('Kuya Louis') to take the nominative case. Example (5) doesn't satisfy principles (i) and (ii). That is, principle (i) requires the actor ('Kuya Louis') to precede all other arguments. However, since the actor also takes the nominative case, principle (ii) requires the phrase 'Kuya Louis' to come last. The preferred order of agent and patient in Tagalog active clauses is still being debated. Therefore, we can assume that there are two "unmarked" word orders: VSO or VOS.

Binihag {si=Kuya Luis} ng=kagandahan ni=Emma
PERF-capture-OV {NOM=big brother Luis} GEN=beauty GEN=Emma
Big brother Luis was captivated by Emma's beauty.

A change in word order and trigger generally corresponds to a change in definiteness ("the" vs "a") in English. Example (6) shows a change in word order, triggered by the indirect, "ng." Example (7) shows a change in word order, triggered by the direct, "ang."

B(in)asa ng tao ang libró.
P=read INDIR person DIR book
A person read the book.

B(um)asa ang tao ng libró
A=read DIR person INDIR book
The person read a book.

Word order may be inverted (referred to in Tagalog grammar as kabalikáng anyô) by way of the inversion marker 'ay ' (which may be contracted into ’y after vowels, diphthongs ending in W or Y or the consonant N in informal speech, literature and song lyrics). Contrary to popular belief, this is not the copula 'to be' as 'ay' does not behave as an existential marker in an SVO structure and an inverted form VSO does not require 'ay' since the existentiality is denoted by case marking. A slight, but optional, pause in speech or a comma in writing may replace the inversion marker. This construction is often viewed by native speakers as formal or literary; such usage is widely used in journalistic writing such as in newspaper or broadcast news headlines.

In this construction (ay-inversion), the 'ay' appears between the fronted constituent and the remainder of the clause. The fronted constituent in the construction includes locations and adverbs. Example (8)- (11) shows the inverted form of the sentences in the previous examples above.

Ang batà ay kumakantá
DIR child ay singing
The child is singing.

Ang serbesa 'y iniinom nila
DIR beer ay drinking them
They are drinking the beer.

Ang mga=dalaga 'y magagandá.
DIR PL=girls ay beautiful
The girls are beautiful.

Ang ulán ay malakás
DIR rain ay strong
The rain is strong.

In (8) and (11), the fronted constituent is the subject. On the other hand, in (9), the fronted constituent is the object. Another example of a fronted constituent in Tagalog is, wh-phrases. Wh-phrases include interrogative questions that begin with: who, what, where, when, why, and how. In Tagalog, wh-phrases occur to the left of the clause. For example, in the sentence, 'Who are you?', which translates to, 'Sino ka?' occurs to the left of the clause. The syntactic tree of this sentence is found in (12a). As we can see in (12a), the complementizer position is null. However, in the case where an overt complementizer is present, Sabbagh (2014) proposes that the wh-phrase lowers from Spec, CP, and adjoins to TP when C is overt (12b). The operation in (12b) is known as, WhP lowering.

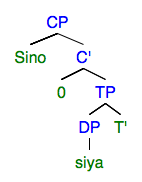
(12a) Syntax tree, made with http://mshang.ca/syntree/

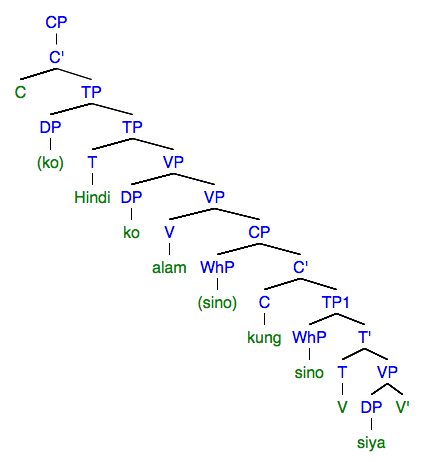
(12a), Syntax tree adapted from Sabbagh (2014), example 62, made with http://mshang.ca/syntree/

This operation of lowering can also be applied in sentences to account for the verb-initial word order in Tagalog. The subject-lowering analysis states that "the subject lowers from Spec, TP and adjoins to a projection dominated by TP.". If we use the example from (2), Nagbigáy ang lalaki ng libró sa babae. and applied subject lowering, we would see the syntax tree in (13a).If we lowered the subject, ang lalaki, to an intermediate position within VP, we would be able to achieve a VOS word order and still satisfy subject lowering. This can be seen in (13b).

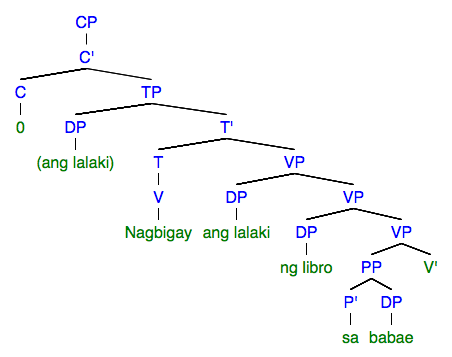
(13a) Syntax tree, adapted from Sabbagh (2014), 70 (55), made with http://mshang.ca/syntree/

Lowering is motivated by a prosodic constraint called, WeakStart. This constraint is largely based on the phonological hierarchy. This constraint requires the first phonological element within a phonological domain to be lower on the prosodic hierarchy than elements that follow it, within the same domain.

== Negation ==
There are three negation words: hindî, walâ, and huwág.

Hindî negates verbs and equations. It is sometimes contracted to ‘dî.

- Hindî akó magtatrabaho bukas.

"I will not work tomorrow."

- Hindî mayaman ang babae.

"The woman is not rich."

Walâ is the opposite of may and mayroón ("there is").

- Walâ akóng pera.
- Akó ay waláng pera.

"I do not have money."

- Waláng libró sa loób ng bahay niyá.

"There are no books in his house."

Huwág is used in expressing negative commands. It can be used for the infinitive and the future aspect. It is contracted as ‘wag.

- Huwág kang umiyák.

"Do not cry."

- Huwág kayóng tumakbó rito.

"Do not run here."

There are two (or more) special negative forms for common verbs:

- Gustó/Ibig/Nais ko nang kumain.

"I would like to eat now." (Positive)

- Ayaw ko pang kumain.

"I don't want to eat yet." (Negative)

== Interrogative words ==
Tagalog's interrogative words are: alín, anó, bákit, gaáno, gaálin, makáilan, ilán, kailán, kaníno, kumustá, magkáno, nakaníno, nasaán, níno, paáno, pasaán, saán, tagasaán, and síno. With the exceptions of bakit, kamustá(maáno), and nasaán, all of the interrogative words have optional plural forms which are formed by reduplication. They are used when the person who is asking the question anticipates a plural answer and can be called wh-phrases. The syntactic position of these types of phrases can be seen in (12a).

Alíng palda ang gustó mo?
Which skirt DEF like you
Which skirt do you like?

Anó ang ginagawâ mo?
What DEF doing you?
What are you doing?

Bakit nasa Barcelona sila?
Why in Barcelona they
Why are they in Barcelona?

Kailán uuwì si-=Victor
When {go home} Victor
When will Victor go home?

Nasaán si=Antonia?
Where Antonia
Where is Antonia?

Gaano (from ga- + anó) means how but is used in inquiring about the quality of an adjective or an adverb. The root word of the modifier is prefixed with ga- in this construction (16a).Ilán means how many (16b). Kumustá is used to inquire how something is (are).(16c) It is frequently used as a greeting meaning How are you? It is derived from the Spanish ¿cómo está?. Magkano (from mag- + gaano) means how much and is usually used in inquiring the price of something (16d). Paano (from pa- + anó) is used in asking how something is done or happened (16e).

Gaano ka katagál sa Montreal?
How you long in Montreal?
How long will you be in Montreal?

Iláng taón ka na?
{How many} year you now?
How old are you?

Kumusta ka?
How you?
How are you?

Magkano ang kotseng iyón?
{How much} DEF car that
How much is that car?

Paano mo gagawin?
How you do
How will you do this?

Gaalin galíng dito hanggang doon?
{How long} from here to there
How long does it take from here to there?

Nino (from ni + anó) means who, whose, and whom (18a). It is the indirect and genitive form of sino. Sino (from si + anó) means who and whom and it is in the direct form (18b). Kanino (from kay + anó) means whom or whose (18c). It is the oblique form of sino (who).

Ginawâ nino?
PAST=do Who
Who did it?

Sino siyá
Who she/he
Who is he/she?

Kanino itó
Whose this
Whose is this?

== See also ==
- Abakada alphabet
- Commission on the Filipino Language
- Filipino alphabet
- Filipino orthography
- Tagalog phonology
- Old Tagalog

== Bibliography ==
- Kroeger, P. R. (1991). Phrase structure and grammatical relations in Tagalog
- Ramos, T. (1971). Tagalog Structures. Honolulu, HI: University of Hawaii Press. p. 126.
- Rubino, C. (2002). Tagalog-English, English-Tagalog dictionary / Taláhuluganang Pilipino-Ingglés, Ingglés-Pilipino Taláhuluganang. Conshohocken, PA: Hippocrene Books.
- Sabbagh, J. (2014). Word order and Prosodic‐Structure constraints in Tagalog. Syntax, 17(1), 40–89. doi:10.1111/synt.12012
- Sabbagh, J. (2011). Adjectival passives and the structure of VP in Tagalog. Lingua, 121, 1424–1452. doi:10.1016/j.lingua.2011.03.006
- Scontras, G. & Nicolae A. (2014). Saturating syntax: Linkers and modification in Tagalog. Lingua, 149, 17–33. doi:10.1016/j.lingua.2014.05.005
- Baybayin: Paglalayag sa Wika at Panitikan 8 by Remedios Infantado ISBN 978-971-23-7030-4 pp. 133–134, 169
- Bagong Likha: Wika at Pagbasa 4, by Ester V. Raflores ISBN 978-971-655-331-4, pp. 239, 252–253, 267–268, 283, 326–327, 341–342
- Pinagyamang Pluma 9, by Ailene G. Baisa-Julian, Mary Grace G. del Rosario, Nestor S. Lontoc ISBN 978-971-06-3652-5, p. 86, 383
- mga-uri-ng-pang-uri.pdf. samutsamot.files.wordpress.com. Retrieved 19 June 2019.
- Baybayin: Paglalayag sa Wika at Panitikan 7 by Ramilito Correa ISBN 978-971-23-7028-1 p. 19
