= Agutaynen language =

Austronesian language spoken in the Philippines

Agutaynen
- Native to: Philippines
- Region: Mimaropa
- Native speakers: 19,608 (2010)
- Language family: Austronesian: Malayo-Polynesian; Philippine; Kalamian; Agutaynen

Language codes
- ISO 639-3: agn
- Glottolog: agut1237

The Agutaynen language is spoken on Agutaya Island in the province of Palawan in the Philippines.

== Distribution ==
Caabay & Melvin (2014: 1-2) note that Agutaynen is spoken by about 15,000 people on Agutaya Island and six of the smaller of the smaller Cuyo Islands, namely Diit, Maracañao, Matarawis, Algeciras, Concepcion, and Quiniluban. After World War II, Agutaynen speakers were also moved to San Vicente, Roxas, Brooke’s Point, Balabac, Linapacan, and Puerto Princesa City municipalities on Palawan Island.

== Phonology ==
=== Consonants ===
		Labial	Alveolar	Palatal	Velar	Glottal
Plosive	voiceless	p	t		k	ʔ
Plosive	voiced	b	d		ɡ	
Nasal		m	n		ŋ	
Fricative			s			h
Rhotic			r ~ ɾ			
Lateral			l			
Approximant		w		j		

=== Vowels ===
	Front	Central	Back
Close	i	ɨ	o ~ u
Mid			o ~ u
Open		a	

- /o/ can fluctuate to sounds of [o], [ʊ], [u].

== Grammar ==
=== Pronouns ===
The following set of pronouns are the pronouns found in the Agutaynen language. Note: the direct/nominative case is divided between full and short forms.

Agutaynen pronouns
	Direct/Nominative	Indirect/Genitive	Oblique
1st person singular	yo (o)	o	yɨn
2nd person singular	yawa (a)	mo	nio
3rd person singular	tanandia	na	nandia
1st person plural inclusive	ita	ta	yatɨn
1st person plural exclusive	yami (ami)	amɨn	yamɨn
2nd person plural	yamo (amo)	mi	nindio
3rd person plural	tanira	nira	nira

== Bibliography ==
- Quakenbush, J. Stephen, comp. 1999. "Agutaynen texts. Studies in Agutaynen, Part I". In: Studies in Philippine Languages and Cultures 11 (1): 7–88. available online from SIL
