= Kalamian languages =

Subgroup of the Austronesian language family

Kalamian
- Geographic distribution: islands between Mindoro and Palawan
- Linguistic classification: Austronesian: Malayo-Polynesian; Philippine; Kalamian

Language codes
- ISO 639-3: –
- Glottolog: kala1389

The Kalamian languages are a small cluster of languages spoken in the Philippines: Calamian Tagbanwa and Agutaynen. Other languages called Tagbanwa, the Aborlan Tagbanwa language and Central Tagbanwa language are members of the Palawanic languages.

These are among the few languages of the Philippines which continue to be written in indigenous scripts, though mostly for poetry.

== Classification ==
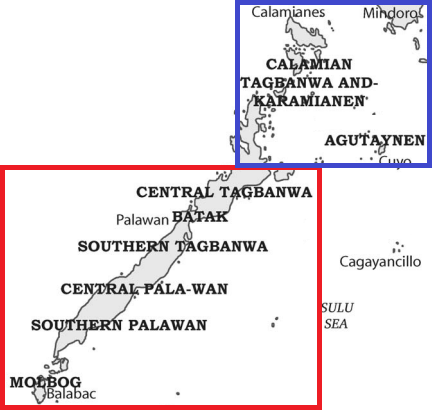
Kalamian [blue] languages of Palawan

The Kalamian languages are a primary branch of the Philippine language family, notable for reflecting Proto-Malayo-Polynesian *q as k and *R as l, while reducing original *k to zero.

== See also ==
- Tagbanwa script
