= Calamian Tagbanwa language =

Austronesian language spoken in the Philippines

Calamian Tagbanwa
- ᝦᝲᝨᝪᝯ, Tinagbanwa
- Native to: Philippines
- Region: Calamian Islands
- Ethnicity: Tagbanwa people
- Native speakers: 10,000 (2007)
- Language family: Austronesian: Malayo-Polynesian; Philippine; Kalamian; Calamian Tagbanwa
- Writing system: Tagbanwa alphabet

Language codes
- ISO 639-3: tbk
- Glottolog: cala1258

Calamian Tagbanwa is spoken in the Calamian Islands just north of Palawan Island, Philippines. It is not mutually intelligible with the other languages of the Tagbanwa people. Ethnologue reports that it is spoken in Busuanga, Coron, Culion, and Linapacan municipalities (Calamian and Linapacan island groups).

== Dialects ==
Himes (2006) considers there to be two distinct dialects.

- Karamiananen: spoken on Busuanga Island and Dipalengged Island. The speakers on Dipalengged Island refer to their language as Tagbanwa.
- Tagbanwa of Coron: spoken on Coron Island, and also in Baras, Palawan Island located just opposite of Dumaran Island.

== Phonology ==
=== Consonants ===
Calamian Tagbanwa consonants
		Labial	Alveolar	Palatal	Velar	Glottal
Nasal		m	n		ŋ	
Plosive	voiceless	p	t		k	ʔ
Plosive	voiced	b	d		ɡ	
Fricative		β	s		ɣ	
Lateral			l			
Rhotic			ɾ~r			
Approximant		w		j		

=== Vowels ===
Calamian Tagbanwa vowels
	Front	Central	Back
Close	i	ɨ	u
Open		a	

== Grammar ==
=== Pronouns ===
The following set of pronouns are the pronouns found in the Calamian Tagbanwa language. Note: the direct/nominative case is divided between full and short forms.

Calamian Tagbanwa pronouns
	Direct/Nominative	Indirect/Genitive	Oblique
1st person singular	yuu/yaku (aw)	u	yɨɨn/yakɨn
2nd person singular	yawa (a)	mu	nuyu
3rd person singular	tanya	na	anya
1st person plural inclusive	ita	ta	yatɨn
1st person plural exclusive	yami (ami)	yamɨn	yamɨn
2nd person plural	yamu (amu)	mi	numyu
3rd person plural	tanira	nira	nira
