= Old Tagalog =

Language spoken in 10th century AD

- ᜆᜄᜎᜓ
- Pronunciation: [t̪ɐ̞gal̪og]
- Region: Philippines, particularly the present-day regions of Calabarzon and Mimaropa
- Era: 10th century AD (developed into Classical Tagalog in c. 16th century; continued as modern Southern Tagalog dialects spoken in Aurora, Calabarzon, and Mimaropa, most popular is the Batangas dialect.)
- Language family: Austronesian: Malayo-Polynesian; Philippine; Greater Central Philippine; Central Philippine; Old Tagalog
- Writing system: Baybayin; Luzon Kawi (before c. 1300)

Language codes
- ISO 639-3: –

Old Tagalog (Tagalog: Lumang Tagalog; Baybayin: pre-virama: ᜎᜓᜋ ᜆᜄᜎᜓ, post-virama [krus kudlit]: ᜎᜓᜋᜅ᜔ ᜆᜄᜎᜓᜄ᜔; post-virama [pamudpod]: ᜎᜓᜋᜅ᜕ ᜆᜄᜎᜓᜄ᜕) refers to the unattested, pre-Hispanic stage of the Tagalog language. The language originated from the Proto-Philippine language and evolved to Classical Tagalog spoken during Spanish occupation, which was the basis for Modern Tagalog. Old Tagalog sparsely used Baybayin, one of the scripts indigenous to the Philippines.

No manuscripts, inscriptions, or written records in Tagalog are known from the pre-colonial period.

== History ==
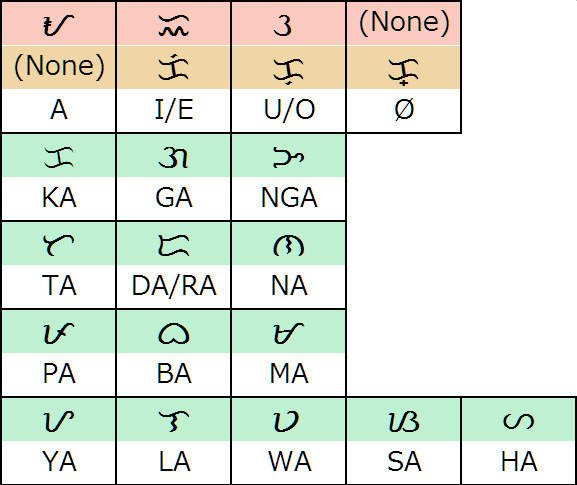
The Baybayin script, used to write in Tagalog prior to the arrival of the Spanish in 16th century.

Old Tagalog is one of the Central Philippine languages, which evolved from the Proto-Philippine language, which comes from the Austronesian peoples who settled in the Philippines around 2200 BC.

The early history of the Tagalog language remains relatively obscure, and a number of theories exist as to the exact origins of the Tagalog peoples and their language. Scholars such as Robert Blust suggest that the Tagalogs originated in northeastern Mindanao or the eastern Visayas. Possible words of Old Tagalog origin are attested in the Laguna Copperplate Inscription from the 10th century, which is largely written in Old Malay.

The question has been raised about the origin of some words in the various languages of the Philippines and their possible connection to ancient Buddhist and Hindu culture in the region, as the language is influenced by Sanskrit, Malay, Tamil and Chinese.

== Phonology ==
Old Tagalog vowels
	Front	Central	Back
Close	i		u
Open		a	

Consonant phonemes of Old Tagalog
	Labial	Dental/ Alveolar	Dorsal	Glottal
Nasal	m	n	ŋ	
Stop	p b	t d	k ɡ	ʔ
Fricative		s		h
Approximant	w	l	j	h

== Writing system ==
Old Tagalog was written in Baybayin, a writing system formerly used in the Philippines which belongs to the Brahmic family of scripts.

The italicized letters are foreign.

vowels
	᜔
a	ᜀ
i e	ᜁ
u o	ᜂ

b
/b/	ᜊ᜔
ba	ᜊ
bi be	ᜊᜒ
bu bo	ᜊᜓ

k
/k/	ᜃ᜔
ka	ᜃ
ki ke	ᜃᜒ
ku ko	ᜃᜓᜓ

d/r
/d/ /r/	ᜇ᜔
da/ra	ᜇ
di/ri de/re	ᜇᜒ
du/ru do/ro	ᜇᜓ

g
/g/	ᜄ᜔
ga	ᜄ
gi ge	ᜄᜒ
gu go	ᜄᜓ

h
/h/	ᜑ᜔
ha	ᜑ
hi he	ᜑᜒ
hu ho	ᜑᜓ

l
/l/	ᜎ᜔
la	ᜎ
li le	ᜎᜒ
lu lo	ᜎᜓ

m
/m/	ᜋ᜔
ma	ᜋ
mi me	ᜋᜒ
mu mo	ᜋᜓ

n
/n/	ᜈ᜔
na	ᜈ
ni ne	ᜈᜒ
nu no	ᜈᜓ

ng
/ŋ/	ᜅ᜔
nga	ᜅ
ngi nge	ᜅᜒ
ngu ngo	ᜅᜓ

p
/p/	ᜉ᜔
pa	ᜉ
pi pe	ᜉᜒ
pu po	ᜉᜓ

s
/s/	ᜐ᜔
sa	ᜐ
si se	ᜐᜒ
su so	ᜐᜓ

t
/t/	ᜆ᜔
ta	ᜆ
ti te	ᜆᜒ
tu to	ᜆᜓ

w
/w/	ᜏ᜔
wa	ᜏ
wi we	ᜏᜒ
wu wo	ᜏᜓ

y
/j/	ᜌ᜔
ya	ᜌ
yi ye	ᜌᜒ
yu yo	ᜌᜓ

== See also ==
- Proto-Philippine language
- Filipino language
- Dambana
- Baybayin
- Filipino alphabet
- Languages of the Philippines
- Suyat
- Laguna Copperplate Inscription (LCI)
