= Tagalog language =

Austronesian language spoken in the Philippines

Tagalog
- Wikang Tagalog ᜏᜒᜃᜅ᜔ ᜆᜄᜎᜓᜄ᜔
- Pronunciation: [tɐˈɡaːloɡ]
- Native to: Philippines
- Region: Metro Manila, parts of Central Luzon, most of Calabarzon, parts of Mimaropa, northwestern Bicol Region, and Ilocos Region (southeast Pangasinan)
- Ethnicity: Tagalog
- Speakers: L1: 33 million (2023); L2: 54 million (2020); Total: 87 million (2020–2023)
- Language family: Austronesian: Malayo-Polynesian; Philippine; Greater Central Philippine; Central Philippine; Kasiguranin–Tagalog; Tagalog
- Early forms: Proto-Austronesian: Proto-Malayo-Polynesian; Proto-Philippine; Proto-Greater Central Philippine; Proto-Central Philippine; Old Tagalog
- Standard forms: Filipino (Manila dialect)
- Dialects: Bataan; Batangas; Bulacan; Lubang; Marinduque; Puray; Tanay–Paete (Eastern Rizal-Northern Laguna); Tayabas
- Writing system: Latin script (Filipino alphabet, Abakada alphabet); Philippine Braille; Baybayin (revitalizing); Jawi script (historically)

Official status
- Official language in: Philippines (as Filipino)
- Recognised minority language in: Philippines (as a regional language and an auxiliary official language in the predominantly Tagalog-speaking areas of the Philippines)
- Regulated by: Komisyon sa Wikang Filipino

Language codes
- ISO 639-1: tl
- ISO 639-2: tgl
- ISO 639-3: tgl
- Glottolog: taga1280 Tagalogic taga1269 Tagalog-Filipino taga1270 Tagalog
- Linguasphere: 31-CKA
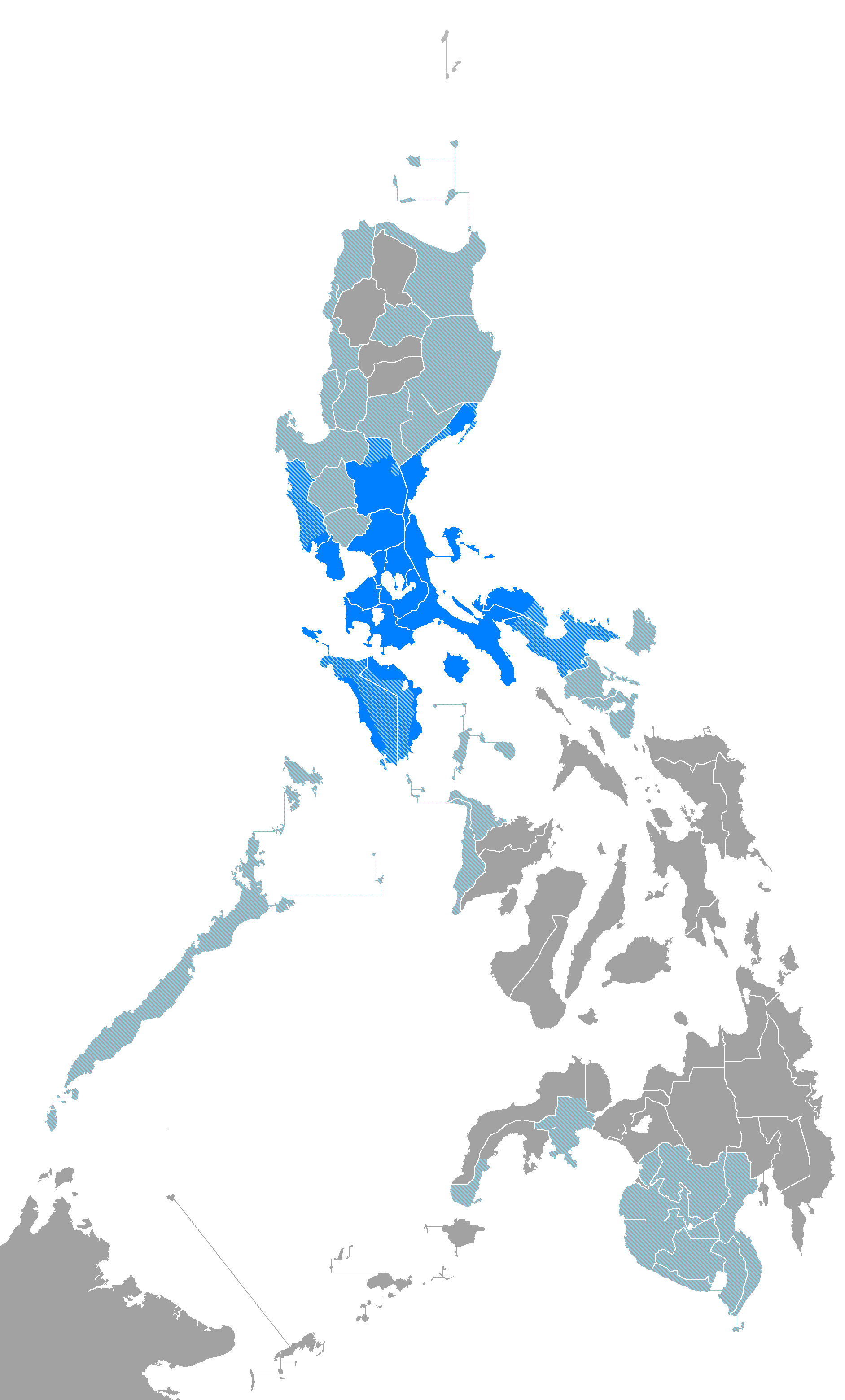
- Predominantly Tagalog-speaking regions in the Philippines

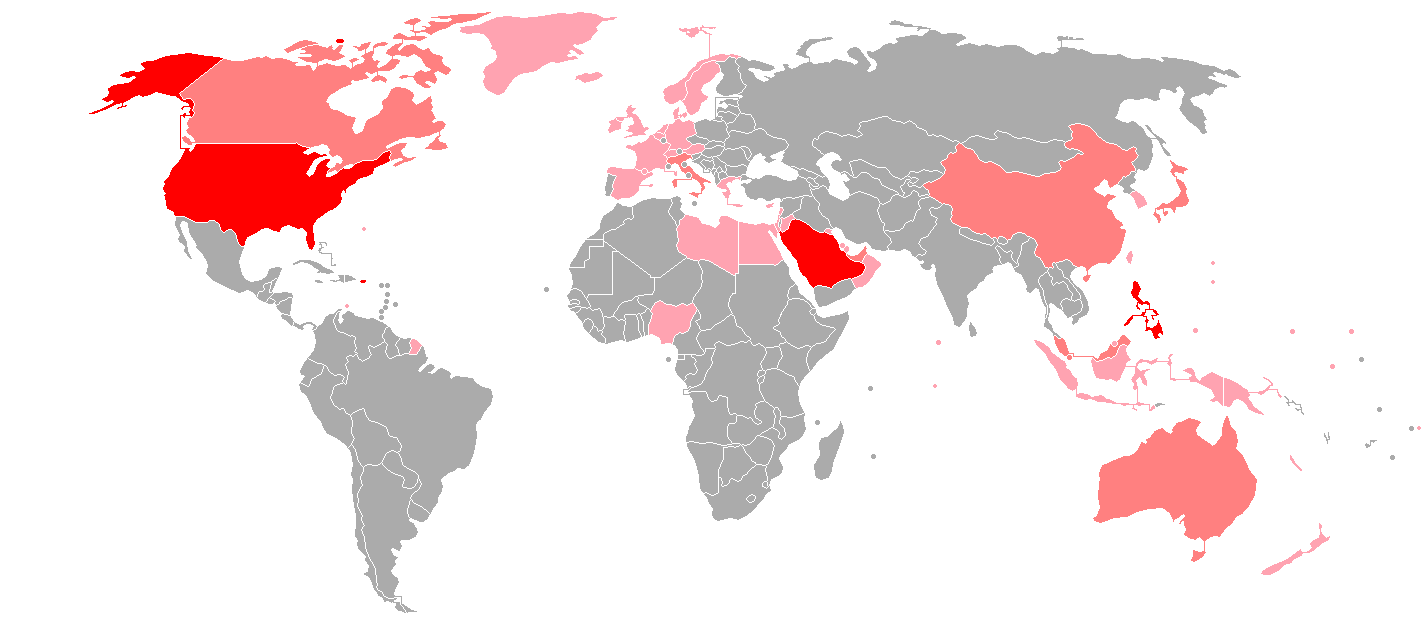
- Global distribution of Tagalog speakers. Countries with more than 500,000 speakers Countries with between 100,000–500,000 speakers Countries where it is spoken by minor communities

A Tagalog speaker, recorded in South Africa.

Tagalog (/təˈɡɑːlɒɡ/ tə-GAH-log; native pronunciation: [tɐˈɡaːloɡ]; Baybayin: ᜆᜄᜎᜓᜄ᜔) is an Austronesian language spoken as a first language by the ethnic Tagalog people, who make up a quarter of the population of the Philippines, and as a second language by the majority. Its standardized and codified form, Filipino, is the national language of the Philippines, and is one language of the nation's two official languages, alongside English.

Tagalog, like other Austronesian languages, commonly uses verb-subject-object order, but can also use subject-verb-object order. Tagalog follows the trigger system of morphosyntactic alignment that is common among Philippine languages. It has head-initial directionality. It is an agglutinative language but can also display inflection. It is not a tonal language and can be considered a pitch-accent language and a syllable-timed language. It has nine basic parts of speech.

Tagalog is closely related to other Philippine languages, such as the Bikol languages, the Bisayan languages, Ilocano, Kapampangan, and Pangasinan, and more distantly to other Austronesian languages, such as the Formosan languages of Taiwan, Indonesian, Malay, Hawaiian, Māori, Malagasy, and many more.

== Classification ==
Tagalog is a Central Philippine language within the Austronesian language family. Being Malayo-Polynesian, it is related to other Austronesian languages, such as Malagasy, Javanese, Indonesian, Malay, Tetum (of Timor), and Yami (of Taiwan). It is closely related to the languages spoken in the Bicol Region and the Visayas islands, such as the Bikol group and the Visayan group, including Waray, Hiligaynon and Cebuano.

Tagalog differs from other Central Philippine languages with its treatment of the Proto-Philippine schwa vowel *ə. In most Bikol and Visayan languages, this sound merged with /u/ and [o]. In Tagalog, it has merged with /i/. For example, Proto-Philippine *dəkət (adhere, stick) is Tagalog dikít and Visayan and Bikol dukót.

Proto-Philippine *r, *j, and *z merged with /d/ but is /l/ between vowels. Proto-Philippine *ŋajan (name) and *hajək (kiss) became Tagalog ngalan and halík. Adjacent to an affix, however, it becomes /r/ instead: bayád (paid) → bayaran (to pay).

== History ==
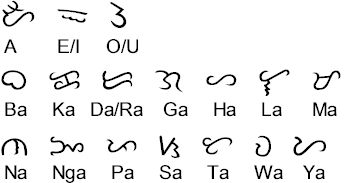
The base consonants and vowels of the Baybayin script, the original writing system of Tagalog

The word Tagalog is possibly derived from the endonym taga-ilog ("river dweller"), composed of tagá- ("native of" or "from") and ilog ("river"), or alternatively, taga-alog deriving from alog ("pool of water in the lowlands"; "rice or vegetable plantation"). Linguists such as David Zorc and Robert Blust speculate that the Tagalogs and other Central Philippine ethno-linguistic groups originated in Northeastern Mindanao or the Eastern Visayas.

Possible words of Old Tagalog origin are attested in the Laguna Copperplate Inscription from the tenth century, which is largely written in Old Malay. The first known complete book to be written in Tagalog is the Doctrina Christiana (Christian Doctrine), printed in 1593. The Doctrina was written in Spanish and two transcriptions of Tagalog; one in the ancient, then-current Baybayin script and the other in an early Spanish attempt at a Latin orthography for the language.

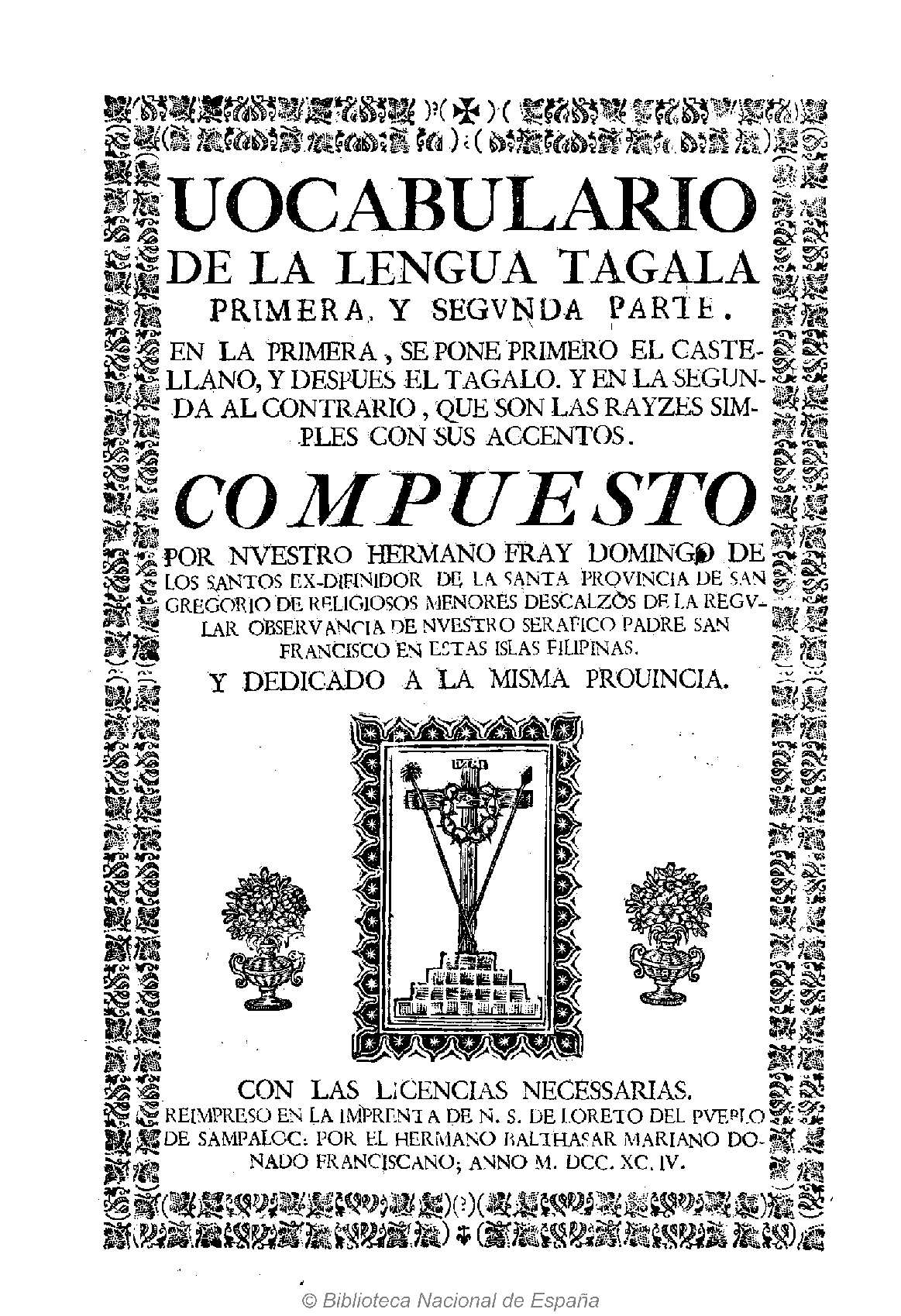
Vocabulario de la lengua tagala, 1794.

Throughout the 333 years of Spanish rule, various grammars and dictionaries were written by Spanish clergymen. In 1610, the Dominican priest Francisco Blancas de San José published the Arte y reglas de la lengua tagala (which was subsequently revised with two editions in 1752 and 1832) in Bataan. In 1613, the Franciscan priest Pedro de San Buenaventura published the first Tagalog dictionary, his Vocabulario de la lengua tagala in Pila, Laguna.

The first substantial dictionary of the Tagalog language was written by the Czech Jesuit missionary Pablo Clain in the beginning of the 18th century. Clain spoke Tagalog and used it actively in several of his books. He prepared the dictionary, which he later passed over to Francisco Jansens and José Hernandez. Further compilation of his substantial work was prepared by P. Juan de Noceda and P. Pedro de Sanlucar and published as Vocabulario de la lengua tagala in Manila in 1754 and then repeatedly reedited, with the last edition being in 2013 in Manila.

Among others, Arte de la lengua tagala y manual tagalog para la administración de los Santos Sacramentos (1850) in addition to early studies of the language.

The indigenous poet Francisco Balagtas (1788–1862) is known as the foremost Tagalog writer, his most notable work being the 19th-century epic Florante at Laura.

=== Official status ===
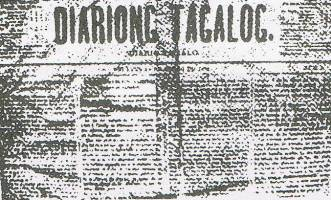
Diariong Tagalog (Tagalog Newspaper), the first bilingual newspaper in the Philippines founded in 1882 written in both Tagalog and Spanish.

Tagalog was declared the official language by the first revolutionary constitution in the Philippines, the Constitution of Biak-na-Bato in 1897.

In 1935, the Philippine constitution designated English and Spanish as official languages, but mandated the development and adoption of a common national language based on one of the existing native languages. After study and deliberation, the National Language Institute, a committee composed of seven members who represented various regions in the Philippines, chose Tagalog as the basis for the evolution and adoption of the national language of the Philippines. President Manuel L. Quezon then, on December 30, 1937, proclaimed the selection of the Tagalog language to be used as the basis for the evolution and adoption of the national language of the Philippines. In 1939, President Quezon designated the proposed Tagalog-based national language as the Wikang Pambansâ (national language). Quezon himself was born and raised in Baler, Aurora, which is a native Tagalog-speaking area.

Upon the country gaining independence on July 4, 1946, Commonwealth Act No. 570, which was approved in June 7, 1940, officially declared it an official language.

Under the Japanese puppet government during World War II, Tagalog as a national language was strongly promoted; the 1943 Constitution specifying: "The government shall take steps toward the development and propagation of Tagalog as the national language."

In 1959, The language was named Pilipino.. The national language has had official status under the 1973 constitution (as "Pilipino") and the 1987 constitution (as "Filipino").

=== Controversy ===
The selection of the Philippine national language in 1937 based on Tagalog generated much geopolitical and linguistic controversy.

Members of the non-Tagalog speaking community, mainly people who speak the Cebuano and Ilocano languages, regarded the decision as a cultural imposition that ignored their languages.

To reduce such tensions between the regions and cultivate a feeling of unity, the government chose to adopt a policy of not referring to regions. President Manuel L. Quezon signed Executive Order No. 263 in 1939, where he designated the language as the Wikang Pambansâ ("National Language").

Twenty years later, in 1959, it was named by then Secretary of Education, José E. Romero, as Pilipino to give it a national rather than ethnic label and connotation. The changing of the name did not, however, result in acceptance among non-Tagalogs, especially Cebuanos who had not accepted the selection.

The national language issue was revived once more during the 1971 Constitutional Convention. The majority of the delegates were in favor of scrapping the idea of a "national language" altogether. A compromise solution was worked out—a "universalist" approach to the national language, to be called Filipino rather than Pilipino. The 1973 constitution makes no mention of Tagalog. When a new constitution was drawn up in 1987, it named Filipino as the national language. The constitution specified that as the Filipino language evolves, it shall be further developed and enriched on the basis of existing Philippine and other languages. Filipino and Tagalog are varieties of the same language, sharing a big bulk of common lexical items and having the same grammar.

=== Use in education ===
Upon the issuance of Executive Order No. 134, Tagalog was declared as basis of the National Language. On April 12, 1940, Executive Order No. 263 was issued ordering the teaching of the national language in all public and private schools in the country.

Article XIV, Section 6 of the 1987 Constitution of the Philippines specifies, in part:

Subject to provisions of law and as the Congress may deem appropriate, the Government shall take steps to initiate and sustain the use of Filipino as a medium of official communication and as language of instruction in the educational system.

Under Section 7, however:

The regional languages are the auxiliary official languages in the regions and shall serve as auxiliary media of instruction therein.

In 2009, the Department of Education promulgated an order institutionalizing a system of mother-tongue based multilingual education ("MLE"), wherein instruction is conducted primarily in a student's mother tongue (one of the various regional Philippine languages) until at least grade three, with additional languages such as Filipino and English being introduced as separate subjects no earlier than grade two. In secondary school, Filipino and English become the primary languages of instruction, with the learner's first language taking on an auxiliary role. After pilot tests in selected schools, the MLE program was implemented nationwide from School Year (SY) 2012–2013.

Tagalog is the first language of a quarter of the population of the Philippines (particularly in Central and Southern Luzon) and the second language for the majority.

== Geographic distribution ==
=== In the Philippines ===
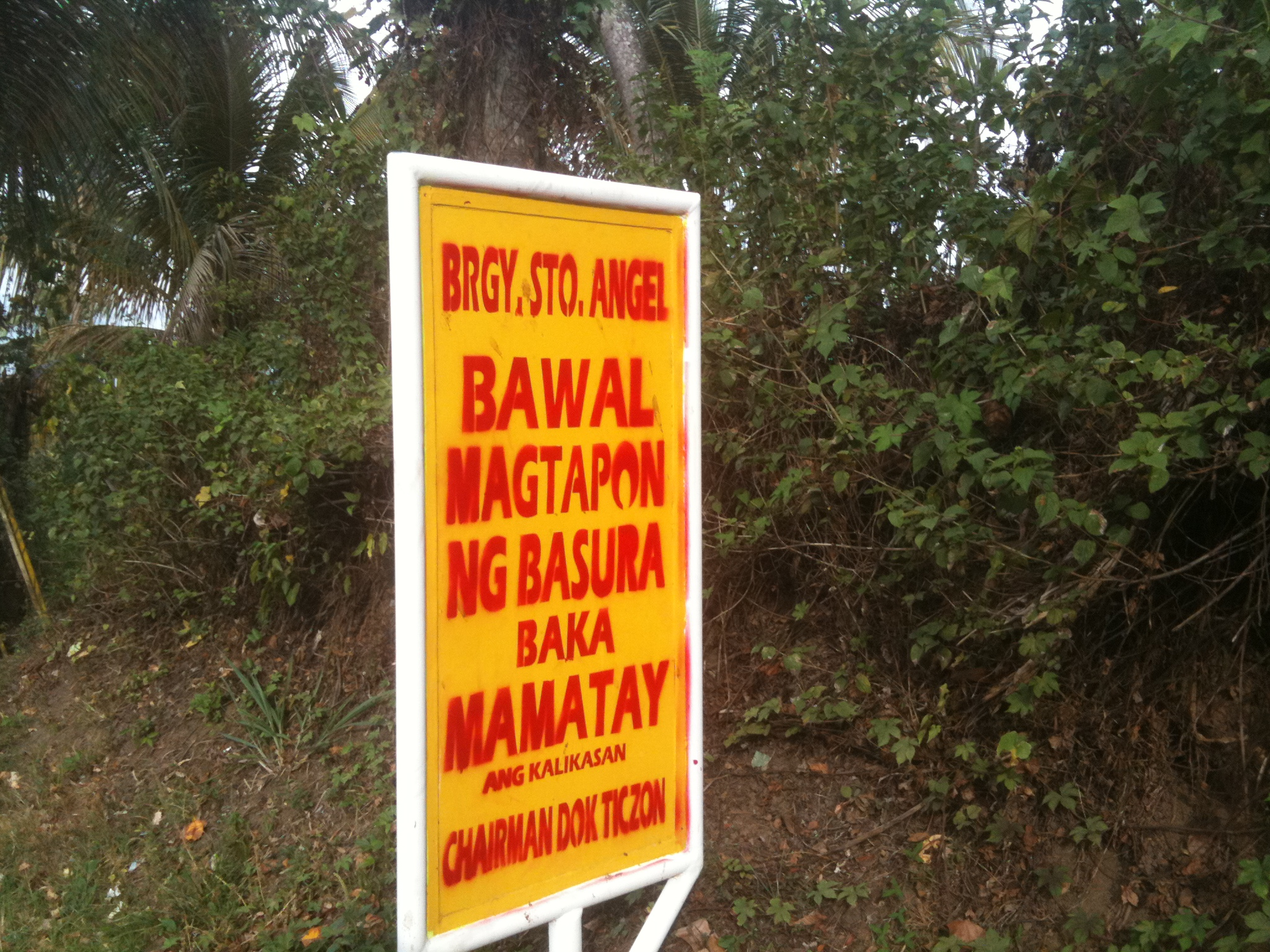
No dumping sign along the highway in the Laguna province, Philippines.

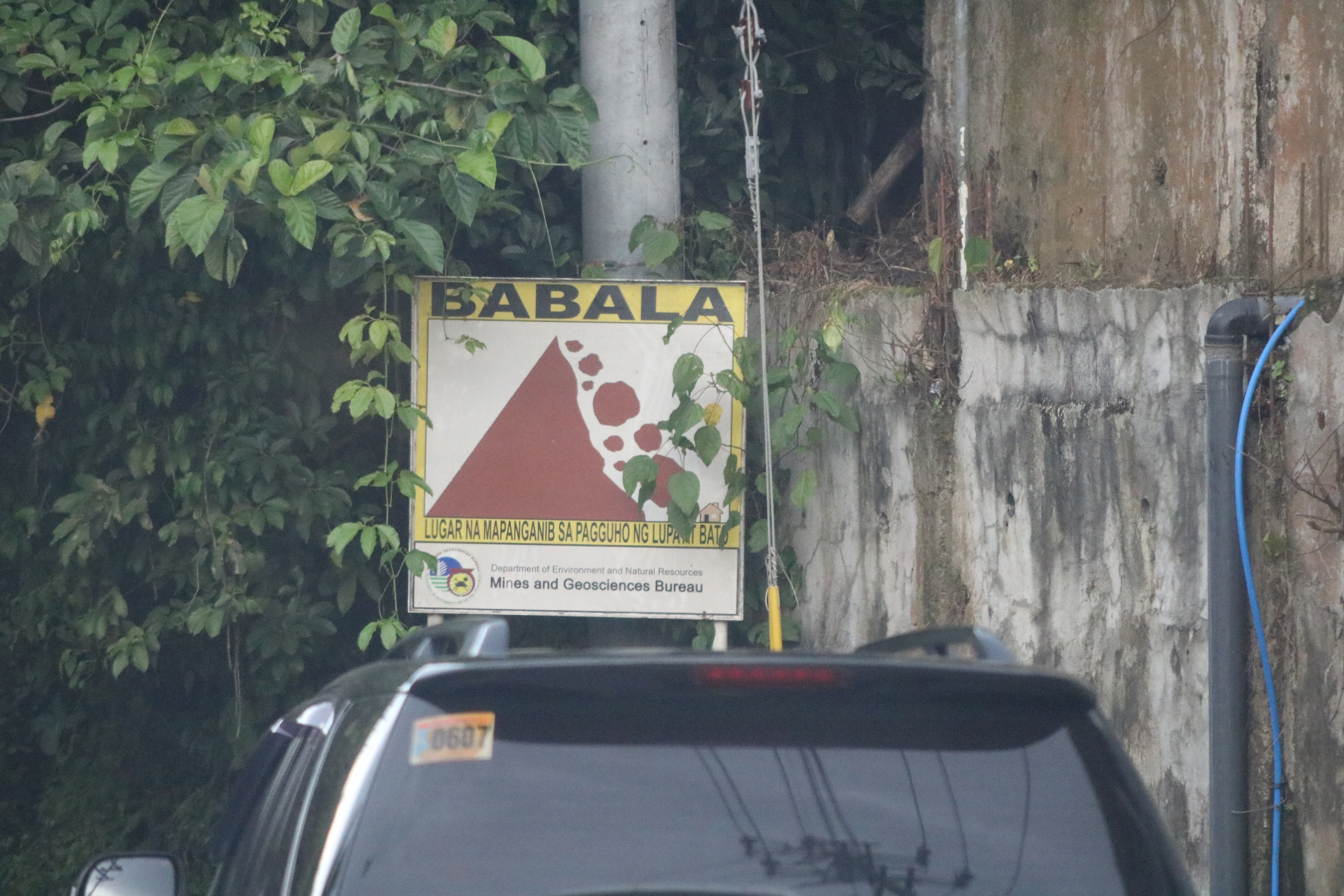
A landslide and rockslide-prone area sign at Indang, Cavite.

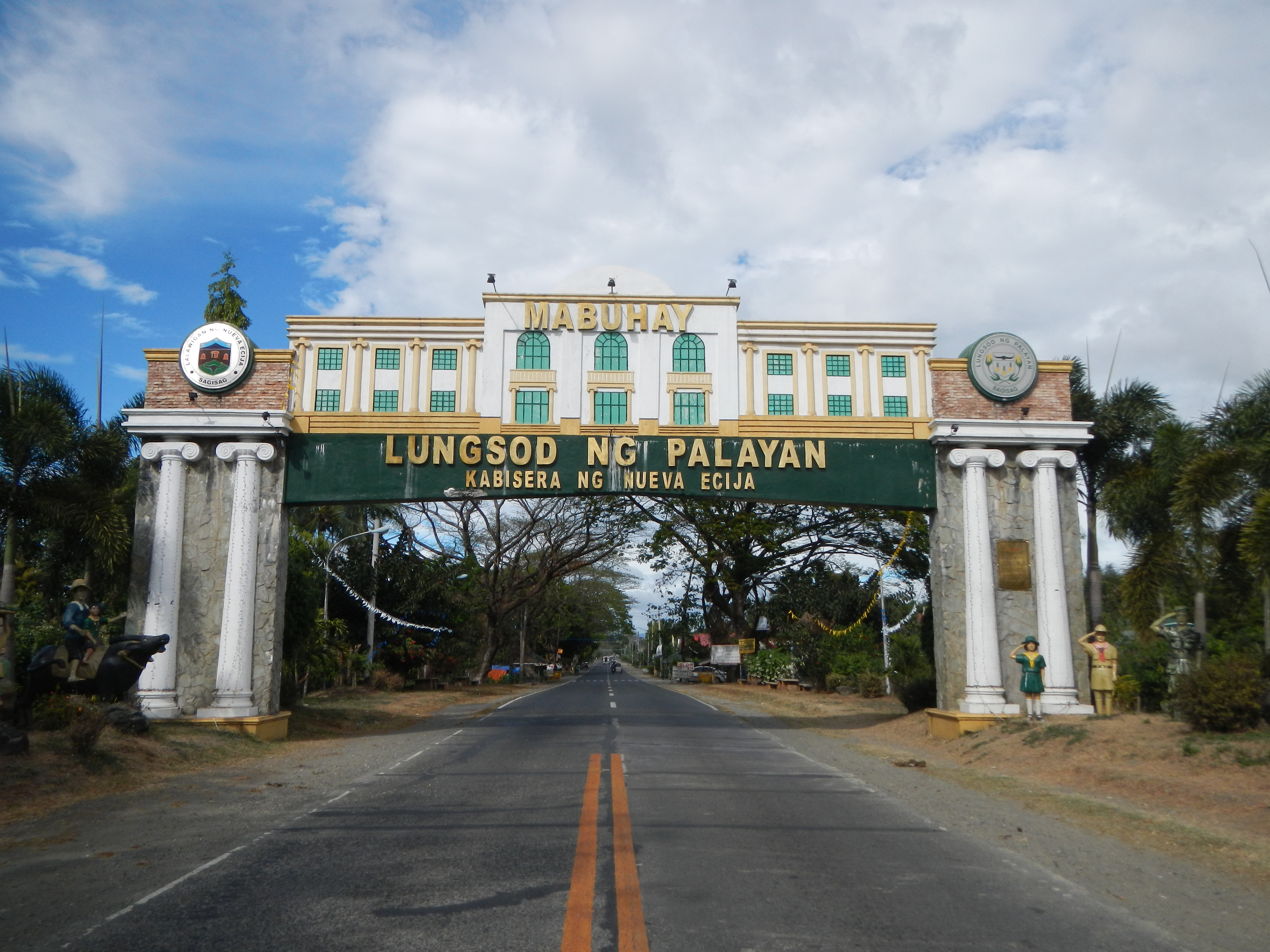
Welcome arch to Palayan, Nueva Ecija.

According to the 2020 census, 109 million people were living in the Philippines. The vast majority have some basic level of understanding of Filipino. The Tagalog homeland, Katagalugan, covers much of the central to southern parts of the island Luzon — particularly in Aurora, Bataan, Batangas, Bulacan, Cavite, Laguna, Metro Manila, Nueva Ecija, Quezon, and Rizal. Tagalog is also spoken natively by inhabitants living on the islands of Marinduque and Mindoro, as well as Palawan to a lesser extent. Significant minorities of Filipino speakers are found in the other Central Luzon provinces of Pampanga and Tarlac, Camarines Norte and Camarines Sur in Bicol Region, the Cordillera city of Baguio, southeast Pangasinan in Ilocos Region, and various parts of Mindanao especially in the island's urban areas. Filipino is also the predominant language of Cotabato City in Mindanao, making it the only place outside of Luzon with a Filipino-speaking majority. It is also the main lingua franca in Bangsamoro Autonomous Region in Muslim Mindanao.

According to the 2000 Philippine Census, approximately 96% of the household population who were able to attend school could speak Filipino; and about 28% of the total population spoke it natively.

The following regions and provinces of the Philippines are majority Tagalog-speaking, overlapping with Filipino-speaking (from north to south):

- Cordillera Administrative Region
  - Baguio (While the regional language Ilocano and indigenous languages Ibaloi and Kankanaey are the native languages of Baguio, a provincial dialect of Filipino, is the majority language.)
- Central Luzon Region
  - Aurora
  - Bataan
  - Bulacan
  - Nueva Ecija
  - Zambales
- Metro Manila (National Capital Region)
- Southern Luzon
  - Southern Tagalog (Calabarzon and Mimaropa)
    - Batangas
    - Cavite
    - Laguna
    - Rizal
    - Quezon
    - Marinduque
    - Occidental Mindoro
    - Oriental Mindoro
    - Romblon (While Romblomanon, Onhan, and Asi are the native languages of the province, a provincial dialect of Filipino, is the lingua franca between the various language groups.)
    - Palawan (Historically a non-Tagalog-speaking province, waves of cross-migration from various other regions, especially Calabarzon, has resulted in a dialect of Filipino, becoming the main spoken language.)
  - Bicol Region (While the Bikol languages have traditionally been the majority languages in the following provinces, heavy Tagalog influence and migration has resulted in its significant presence in these provinces and in many communities, Tagalog succeeded it as the majority language.)
    - Camarines Norte
    - Camarines Sur
- Bangsamoro
  - Maguindanao del Norte and Maguindanao del Sur (While Maguindanao has traditionally been the majority language of these provinces, Tagalog, or especially or more accurately and specifically as, through or in the form of a dialect of Filipino, succeeded it as the main language of "mother tongue" primary education (but here as the local and regional auxiliary official Tagalog language, rather than or instead of the national and official Filipino language) in the province, the majority language in the regional center of Cotabato City (either or both Tagalog or Filipino), and the lingua franca of the Bangsamoro Autonomous Region in Muslim Mindanao or BARMM (predominantly Filipino).)
- Davao Region
  - Metro Davao (While Cebuano is the majority language of the region, a linguistic phenomenon has developed whereby local residents have either shifted to Tagalog or Filipino, or significantly mix Tagalog terms and grammar into their Cebuano speech, or a regional metropolitan variety of Filipino, because older generations speak Tagalog/Filipino in home settings, and Cebuano is spoken in everyday settings, making Tagalog/Filipino the secondary lingua franca. Additionally, migrations from Tagalog-speaking provinces to the area are a contributing factor.)
- Soccsksargen
  - Cotabato, South Cotabato and Sultan Kudarat (Despite Hiligaynon being the regional main lingua franca, migrations from Luzon and Visayas (including influx of migrants from Tagalog-speaking regions) to Cotabato, South Cotabato and Sultan Kudarat has made a dialect of Filipino the secondary lingua franca between various ethnolinguistic groups on everyday basis, especially those not fluent in Hiligaynon. Signages in the region are typically written in Filipino or Tagalog. Filipino is also used in administrative functions by local government, in education and in local media.)

=== Outside the Philippines ===
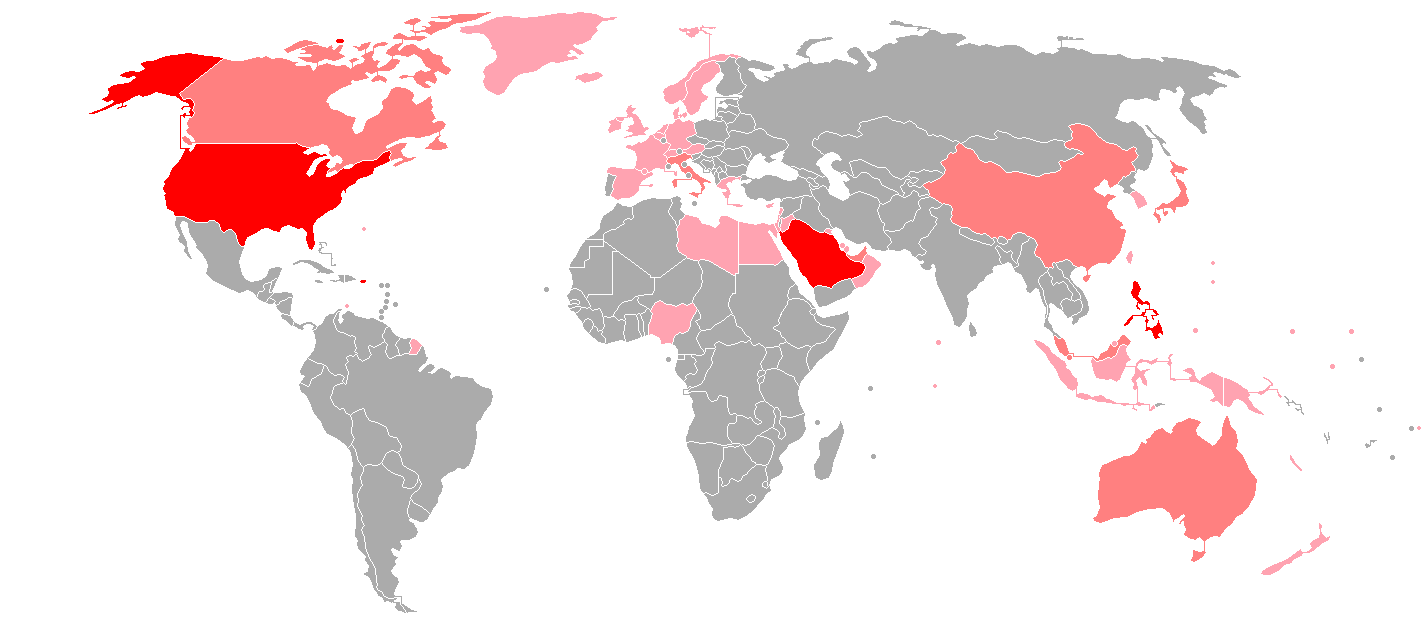
Countries with more than 500,000 speakers Countries with between 100,000–500,000 speakers Countries where it is spoken by minor communities

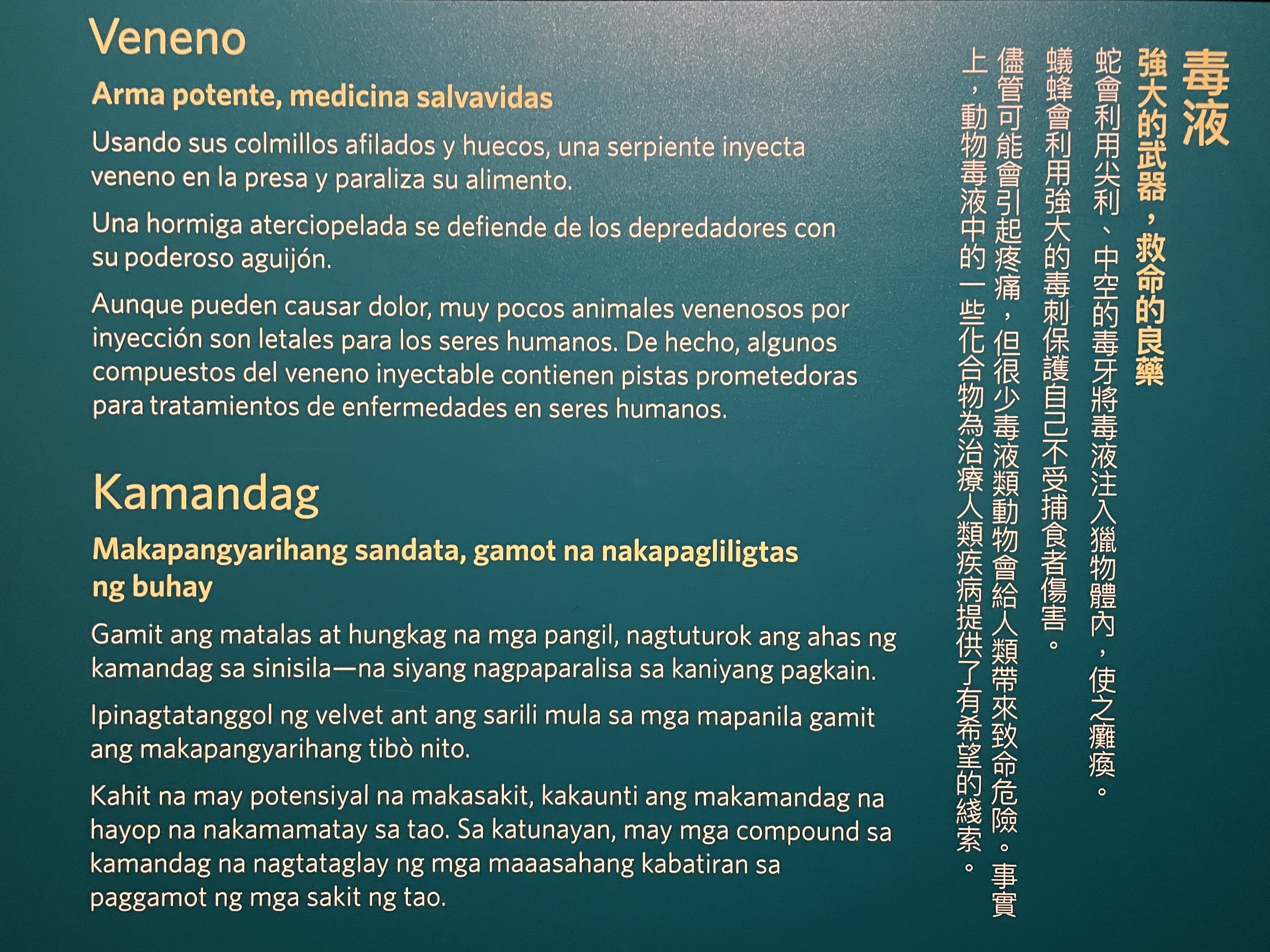
The Tagalog caption (bottom-left) about venom at the California Academy of Sciences in San Francisco includes words that are uncommonly used in Metro Manila such as "hungkag" (hollow), "sinisila" (prey), "mapanila" (predator), "tibò" (stinger), and "kabatiran" (clue/knowledge/discernment).

Tagalog serves as the common language among Overseas Filipinos, though its use overseas is usually limited to communication among Filipino ethnic groups. The largest concentration of Tagalog speakers outside the Philippines is found in the United States, where the 2020 census reported (based on data collected in 2018) that it was the fourth most-spoken non-English language at home with over 1.7 million speakers, behind Spanish, French, and Chinese (with figures for Cantonese and Mandarin combined).

A study based on data from the United States Census Bureau's 2015 American Consumer Survey shows that Tagalog is the most commonly spoken non-English language after Spanish in California, Nevada, and Washington states.

Tagalog is one of three recognized languages in San Francisco, California, along with Spanish and Chinese, making all essential city services be communicated using these languages along with English. In Hawaii, state-funded entities are required to provide oral and written translations for everything in Tagalog and Ilocano. Nevada provides Tagalog Election ballots.

Other countries with significant concentrations of overseas Filipinos and Tagalog speakers include Saudi Arabia with 938,490, Canada with 676,775, Japan with 313,588, United Arab Emirates with 541,593, Kuwait with 187,067, and Malaysia with 620,043.

== Dialects ==
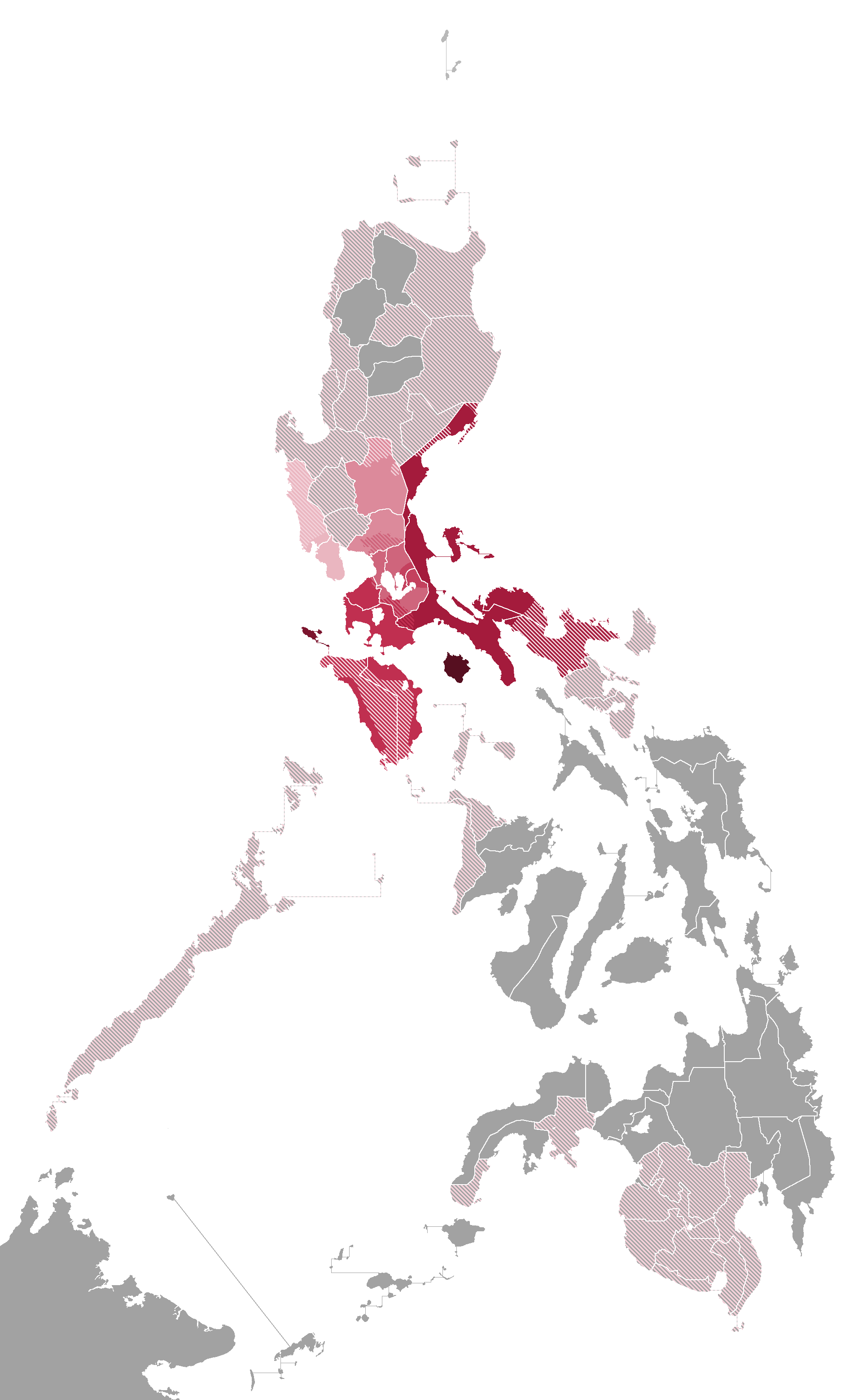
Distribution of Tagalog dialects in the Philippines. The color-schemes represent the four dialect zones of the language: Northern, Central, Southern and Marinduque. While the majority of residents in Camarines Norte and Camarines Sur traditionally speak Bikol as their first language, these provinces nonetheless have significant Tagalog minorities. In addition, Tagalog is used as a second language throughout the country. Northern Tagalog dialects: Bataan (Bataan and Zambales) and Bulacan (Bulacan and Nueva Ecija) Central Tagalog dialects: Manila/Standard Tagalog or Filipino (Metro Manila), and Tanay-Paete (Rizal and Laguna). Southern Tagalog dialects: Batangas (Batangas, Cavite, and Oriental Mindoro), Lubang (Occidental Mindoro), Tayabas (Quezon), and Aurora. Marinduque dialects (Marinduque). Source:

As of 2024, no comprehensive dialectology has been done in the Tagalog-speaking regions, though there have been descriptions in the form of dictionaries and grammars of various Tagalog dialects. Ethnologue lists Manila, Lubang, Marinduque, Bataan (Western Central Luzon), Batangas, Bulacan (Eastern Central Luzon), Tanay-Paete (Rizal-Laguna), and Tayabas (Quezon) as dialects of Tagalog; however, there appear to be four main dialects, of which the aforementioned are a part: Northern (exemplified by the Bulacan dialect), Central (including Manila), Southern (exemplified by Batangas), and Marinduque.

Some example of dialectal differences are:

- Many Tagalog dialects, particularly those in the south, preserve the glottal stop found after consonants and before vowels. This has been lost in Standard Tagalog, probably influenced by Spanish, where the glottal stop doesn't exist. For example, standard Tagalog ngayón (now, today), sinigáng (broth stew), gabí (night), matamís (sweet), are pronounced and written ngay-on, sinig-ang, gab-i, and matam-is in other dialects.
- In Teresian-Morong Tagalog, [ɾ] alternates with [d]. For example, bundók (mountain), dagat (sea), dingdíng (wall), isdâ (fish), and litid (joints) become bunrók, ragat, ringríng, isrâ, and litir, e.g. "sandók sa dingdíng" ("ladle on a wall" or "ladle on the wall", depending on the sentence) becoming "sanrók sa ringríng". However, exceptions are newer loanwords, and if the next consonant after a [d] is an [ɾ] (durog) or an [l] (dilà).
- In many southern dialects, the progressive aspect infix of -um- verbs is na-. For example, standard Tagalog kumakain (eating) is nákáin in Aurora, Quezon, and Batangas Tagalog. This is the butt of some jokes by other Tagalog speakers, for should a Southern Tagalog ask nákáin ka ba ng patíng? ("Do you eat shark?"), he would be understood as saying "Has a shark eaten you?" by speakers of the Manila Dialect.
- Some dialects have interjections which are considered a regional trademark. For example, the interjection ala e! usually identifies someone from Batangas as does hane?! in Rizal and Quezon provinces and akkaw in Aurora.

Perhaps the most divergent Tagalog dialects are those spoken in Marinduque. Linguist Rosa Soberano identifies two dialects, western and eastern, with the former being closer to the Tagalog dialects spoken in the provinces of Batangas and Quezon.

One example is the verb conjugation paradigms. While some of the affixes are different, Marinduque also preserves the imperative affixes, also found in Visayan and Bikol languages, that have mostly disappeared from most Tagalog early 20th century; they have since merged with the infinitive.

Manileño Tagalog	Marinduqueño Tagalog	English
Susulat siná María at Esperanza kay Juan.	Másúlat da María at Esperanza kay Juan.	"María and Esperanza will write to Juan."
Mag-aaral siya sa Maynilà.	Gaaral siya sa Maynilà.	"[He/She] will study in Manila."
Maglutò ka na.	Paglutò.	"Cook now."
Kainin mo iyán.	Kaina yaan.	"Eat it."
Tinatawag tayo ni Tatay.	Inatawag nganì kitá ni Tatay.	"Father is calling us."
Tútulungan ba kayó ni Hilario?	Atulungan ga kamo ni Hilario?	"Is Hilario going to help you?"

Outside of Luzon, a variety of Tagalog called Soccsksargen Tagalog (Sox-Tagalog, also called Kabacan Tagalog) is spoken in Soccsksargen, a southwestern region in Mindanao, as well as Cotabato City. This "hybrid" Tagalog dialect is a blend of Tagalog (including its dialects) with other languages where they are widely spoken and varyingly heard such as Hiligaynon (a regional lingua franca), Ilocano, Cebuano as well as Maguindanaon and other indigenous languages native to region, as a result of migration from Panay, Negros, Cebu, Bohol, Siquijor, Ilocandia, Cagayan Valley, Cordillera Administrative Region, Central Luzon, Calabarzon, Mindoro and Marinduque since the turn of 20th century, therefore making the region a melting pot of cultures and languages.

== Phonology ==
Tagalog has 21 phonemes: 16 are consonants and 5 are vowels. Native Tagalog words follow CV(C) syllable structure, though more complex consonant clusters are permitted in loanwords.

=== Vowels ===
Tagalog has five vowels and four diphthongs. Tagalog originally had three vowel phonemes, /a/, /i/, and /u/, but changed to have five vowel phonemes following the introduction of two marginal phonemes from Spanish, /o/ and /e/.

Table of the five general Tagalog vowel phonemes
	Front	Central	Back
Close	i ⟨i⟩		u ⟨u⟩
Mid	ɛ ⟨e⟩		o̞ ⟨o⟩
Open		a ⟨a⟩	

- /a/ an open central unrounded vowel roughly similar to English "f**a**ther"; in the middle of a word, a near-open central vowel similar to Received Pronunciation "c**u**p"; or an open front unrounded vowel similar to Received Pronunciation or California English "h**a**t"
- /ɛ/ an open-mid front unrounded vowel similar to General American English "b**e**d"
- /i/ a close front unrounded vowel similar to English "mach**i**ne"
- /o̞/ a mid back rounded vowel similar to General American English "s**o**ul" or Philippine English "f**o**rty"
- /u/ a close back rounded vowel similar to English "fl**u**te"

Nevertheless, simplification of pairs [o ~ u] and [ɛ ~ i] is likely to take place, especially in some Tagalog as second language, remote location and working class registers.

The four diphthongs are /aj/, /uj/, /aw/, and /iw/. Long vowels are not written apart from pedagogical texts, where an acute accent is used: á é í ó ú.

Table of all possible realizations of Tagalog vowels
	Front	Central	Back
Close	**i** ⟨i⟩		**u** ⟨u⟩
Near-close	ɪ ⟨i⟩		ʊ ⟨u⟩
Close-mid	e ⟨e/i⟩		o ⟨o/u⟩
Mid	ɛ̝ ⟨e⟩		**o̞** ⟨o⟩
Open-mid	**ɛ** ⟨e⟩		ɔ ⟨o⟩
Near-open		ɐ ⟨a⟩	
Open	a ⟨a⟩	**ä** ⟨a⟩	

The table above shows all the possible realizations for each of the five vowel sounds depending on the speaker's origin or proficiency. The five general vowels are in bold.

=== Consonants ===
Below is a chart of Tagalog consonants. All the stops are unaspirated. The velar nasal occurs in all positions including at the beginning of a word. Loanword variants using these phonemes are italicized inside the angle brackets.

Tagalog consonant phonemes
		Bilabial	Alv./Dental	Post-alv./ Palatal	Velar	Glottal
Nasal		m	n		ŋ ⟨ng⟩	
Stop	voiceless	p	t		k	ʔ
Stop	voiced	b	d		ɡ	
Affricate	voiceless		(ts)	(tʃ) ⟨ts, tiy, ty⟩		
Affricate	voiced		(dz)	(dʒ) ⟨dz, diy, dy⟩		
Fricative			s	(ʃ) ⟨siy, sy, sh⟩		h ⟨h⟩
Approximant			l	j ⟨y⟩	w	
Rhotic			ɾ ⟨r⟩			

- /ɾ/ and /d/ were once allophones, and they still vary grammatically, with initial /d/ becoming intervocalic /ɾ/ in many words.
- A glottal stop that occurs in pausa (before a pause) is omitted when it is in the middle of a phrase, especially in the Metro Manila area. The vowel it follows is then lengthened. However, it is preserved in many other dialects.
- The /ɾ/ phoneme is an alveolar rhotic that has a free variation between a trill, a flap and an approximant ([r~ɾ~ɹ]).
- The /dʒ/ phoneme may become a consonant cluster [dd͡ʒ] in between vowels such as sadyâ [sɐdˈd͡ʒäʔ].

Glottal stop is not indicated. Glottal stops are most likely to occur when:

- the word starts with a vowel, like **a**so (dog)
- the word includes a dash followed by a vowel, like mag-**a**ral (study)
- the word has two vowels next to each other, like pa**a**no (how)
- the word starts with a prefix followed by a verb that starts with a vowel, like mag-aayos ([will] fix)

=== Stress and final glottal stop ===
Stress is a distinctive feature in Tagalog. Primary stress occurs on either the final or the penultimate syllable of a word. Vowel lengthening accompanies primary or secondary stress except when stress occurs at the end of a word.

Tagalog words are often distinguished from one another by the position of the stress or the presence of a final glottal stop. In formal or academic settings, stress placement and the glottal stop are indicated by a diacritic (tuldík) above the final vowel. The penultimate primary stress position (malumay) is the default stress type and so is left unwritten except in dictionaries.

Phonetic comparison of Tagalog homographs based on stress and final glottal stop
Common spelling	Stressed non-ultimate syllable no diacritic	Stressed ultimate syllable acute accent (´)	Unstressed ultimate syllable with glottal stop grave accent (`)	Stressed ultimate syllable with glottal stop circumflex accent (^)
baba	[ˈbaba] baba ('father')	[baˈba] babá ('piggy back')	[ˈbabaʔ] babà ('chin')	[bɐˈbaʔ] babâ ('descend [imperative]')
baka	[ˈbaka] baka ('cow')	[bɐˈka] baká ('possible')		
bata	[ˈbata] bata ('bath robe')	[bɐˈta] batá ('persevere')	[ˈbataʔ] batà ('child')	
bayaran	[bɐˈjaran] bayaran ('pay [imperative]')	[bɐjɐˈran] bayarán ('for hire')		
labi			[ˈlabɛʔ]/[ˈlabiʔ] labì ('lips')	[lɐˈbɛʔ]/[lɐˈbiʔ] labî ('remains')
pito	[ˈpito] pito ('whistle')	[pɪˈto] pitó ('seven')		
sala	[ˈsala] sala ('living room')	[saˈla] salá ('interweaving [of bamboo slats]')	[ˈsalaʔ] salà ('sin')	[sɐˈlaʔ] salâ ('filtered')

== Grammar ==
The grammar of Tagalog is agglutinative, predicate-initial, and organized around the Austronesian alignment system, in which intricate verbal morphology indicates which semantic role is associated with the topic ("ang"-marked) argument.

Tagalog verbs combine a wide array of prefixes, infixes, suffixes, circumfixes, and clitic particles to express voice/"trigger", aspect, mood, and valency changes, resulting in morphologically complex predicate structures.

Tagalog noun morphology is relatively simple compared to its verbal system, though nouns are also productively derived from a range of affixes. Grammatical roles are expressed not by case endings but by a three-way article system (ang, ng, sa) placed directly before the noun clause, distinguishing topic, non-topic, and oblique arguments. Pronouns reflect distinctions in person, number, clusivity, and case.

Word order is typically verb-initial, though SVO may be used in formal contexts. Because the voice/trigger system and article markers indicate grammatical roles, arguments can be freely rearranged to shift focus or emphasize different participants without changing the core meaning.

A defining feature of the language is its productive reduplication system, which includes partial and full reduplication. These patterns perform both grammatical and derivational functions, marking imperfective aspect, intensity, plurality, distributive or repeated action, among other functions.

Another important feature is phonemic stress, wherein the placement of stress is lexically contrastive: identical sequence of sounds can represent distinct words depending on stress (e.g., arálin "to study" vs. aralín "lesson"), and the presence or absence of a glottal stop. Stress interacts with affixation and reduplication in systematic but sometimes nontransparent ways.

== Writing system ==
Tagalog, like other Philippines languages, is written using the Latin alphabet. Prior to the arrival of the Spanish in 1521 and the beginning of their colonization in 1565, Tagalog was written in an abugida—or alphasyllabary—called Baybayin. This system of writing gradually gave way to the use and propagation of the Latin alphabet as introduced by the Spanish. As the Spanish began to record and create grammars and dictionaries for the various languages of the Philippine archipelago, they adopted systems of writing closely following the orthographic customs of the Spanish language and were refined over the years. Until the first half of the 20th century, most Philippine languages were widely written in a variety of ways based on Spanish orthography.

In the late 19th century, a number of educated Filipinos began proposing for revising the spelling system used for Tagalog at the time. In 1884, Filipino doctor and student of languages Trinidad Pardo de Tavera published his study on the ancient Tagalog script Contribucion para el Estudio de los Antiguos Alfabetos Filipinos and in 1887, published his essay El Sanscrito en la lengua Tagalog which made use of a new writing system developed by him. Meanwhile, Jose Rizal, inspired by Pardo de Tavera's 1884 work, also began developing a new system of orthography (unaware at first of Pardo de Tavera's own orthography). A major noticeable change in these proposed orthographies was the use of the letter ⟨k⟩ rather than ⟨c⟩ and ⟨q⟩ to represent the phoneme /k/.

In 1889, the new bilingual Spanish-Tagalog La España Oriental newspaper, of which Isabelo de los Reyes was an editor, began publishing using the new orthography stating in a footnote that it would "use the orthography recently introduced by ... learned Orientalis". This new orthography, while having its supporters, was also not initially accepted by several writers. Soon after the first issue of La España, Pascual H. Poblete's Revista Católica de Filipina began a series of articles attacking the new orthography and its proponents. A fellow writer, Pablo Tecson was also critical. Among the attacks was the use of the letters "k" and "w" as they were deemed to be of German origin and thus its proponents were deemed as "unpatriotic". The publishers of these two papers would eventually merge as La Lectura Popular in January 1890 and would eventually make use of both spelling systems in its articles. Pedro Laktaw, a schoolteacher, published the first Spanish-Tagalog dictionary using the new orthography in 1890.

In April 1890, Jose Rizal authored an article Sobre la Nueva Ortografia de la Lengua Tagalog in the Madrid-based periodical La Solidaridad. In it, he addressed the criticisms of the new writing system by writers like Pobrete and Tecson and the simplicity, in his opinion, of the new orthography. Rizal described the orthography promoted by Pardo de Tavera as "more perfect" than what he himself had developed. The new orthography was, however, not broadly adopted initially and was used inconsistently in the bilingual periodicals of Manila until the early 20th century. The revolutionary society Kataás-taasan, Kagalang-galang Katipunan ng̃ mg̃á Anak ng̃ Bayan or Katipunan made use of the k-orthography and the letter k featured prominently on many of its flags and insignias.

In 1937, Tagalog was selected to serve as basis for the country's national language. In 1940, the Balarilâ ng Wikang Pambansâ (English: Grammar of the National Language) of grammarian Lope K. Santos introduced the Abakada alphabet. This alphabet consists of 20 letters and became the standard alphabet of the national language. The orthography as used by Tagalog would eventually influence and spread to the systems of writing used by other Philippine languages (which had been using variants of the Spanish-based system of writing). In 1987, the Abakada was dropped and replaced by the expanded 28-letter Filipino alphabet.

=== Baybayin ===
Tagalog was written in an abugida (alphasyllabary) called Baybayin prior to the Spanish colonial period in the Philippines, in the 16th century. This particular writing system was composed of symbols representing three vowels and 14 consonants. Belonging to the Brahmic family of scripts, it shares similarities with the Old Kawi script of Java and is believed to be descended from the script used by the Bugis in Sulawesi.

Although it enjoyed a relatively high level of use, Baybayin gradually fell into disuse in favor of the Latin alphabet taught by the Spaniards during their rule.

There has been confusion of how to use Baybayin, which is actually an abugida, or an alphasyllabary, rather than an alphabet. Not every letter in the Latin alphabet is represented with one of those in the Baybayin alphasyllabary. Rather than letters being put together to make sounds as in Western languages, Baybayin uses symbols to represent syllables.

A "kudlít" resembling an apostrophe is used above or below a symbol to change the vowel sound after its consonant. If the kudlit is used above, the vowel is an "E" or "I" sound. If the kudlit is used below, the vowel is an "O" or "U" sound. A special kudlit was later added by Spanish missionaries in which a cross placed below the symbol to get rid of the vowel sound all together, leaving a consonant. Previously, the consonant without a following vowel was simply left out (for example, bundók being rendered as budo), forcing the reader to use context when reading such words.

Example:

vowels
	᜔
a	ᜀ
i e	ᜁ
u o	ᜂ

b
b	ᜊ᜔
ba	ᜊ
bi be	ᜊᜒ
bu bo	ᜊᜓ

k
k	ᜃ᜔
ka	ᜃ
ki ke	ᜃᜒ
ku ko	ᜃᜓᜓ

d/r
d/r	ᜇ᜔
da/ra	ᜇ
di/ri de/re	ᜇᜒ
du/ru do/ro	ᜇᜓ

g
g	ᜄ᜔
ga	ᜄ
gi ge	ᜄᜒ
gu go	ᜄᜓ

h
h	ᜑ᜔
ha	ᜑ
hi he	ᜑᜒ
hu ho	ᜑᜓ

l
l	ᜎ᜔
la	ᜎ
li le	ᜎᜒ
lu lo	ᜎᜓ

m
m	ᜋ᜔
ma	ᜋ
mi me	ᜋᜒ
mu mo	ᜋᜓ

n
n	ᜈ᜔
na	ᜈ
ni ne	ᜈᜒ
nu no	ᜈᜓ

ng
ng	ᜅ᜔
nga	ᜅ
ngi nge	ᜅᜒ
ngu ngo	ᜅᜓ

p
p	ᜉ᜔
pa	ᜉ
pi pe	ᜉᜒ
pu po	ᜉᜓ

s
s	ᜐ᜔
sa	ᜐ
si se	ᜐᜒ
su so	ᜐᜓ

t
t	ᜆ᜔
ta	ᜆ
ti te	ᜆᜒ
tu to	ᜆᜓ

w
w	ᜏ᜔
wa	ᜏ
wi we	ᜏᜒ
wu wo	ᜏᜓ

y
y	ᜌ᜔
ya	ᜌ
yi ye	ᜌᜒ
yu yo	ᜌᜓ

=== Latin alphabet ===
==== Abecedario ====
Until the first half of the 20th century, Tagalog was widely written in a variety of ways based on Spanish orthography consisting of 32 letters called 'ABECEDARIO' (Spanish for "alphabet"). The additional letters beyond the 26-letter English alphabet are: ch, ll, ng, ñ, n͠g / ñg, and rr.

Majuscule	Minuscule	Majuscule	Minuscule
A	a	Ng	ng
B	b	Ñ	ñ
C	c	N͠g / Ñg	n͠g / ñg
Ch	ch	O	o
D	d	P	p
E	e	Q	q
F	f	R	r
G	g	Rr	rr
H	h	S	s
I	i	T	t
J	j	U	u
K	k	V	v
L	l	W	w
Ll	ll	X	x
M	m	Y	y
N	n	Z	z

==== Abakada ====
In 1940, after it was decided that the national language would be Tagalog-based, the grammarian Lope K. Santos introduced a new alphabet consisting of 20 letters called Abakada in school grammar books called balarilâ. The only letter not in the English alphabet is ng.

Majuscule	Minuscule	Majuscule	Minuscule
A	a	N	n
B	b	Ng	ng
K	k	O	o
D	d	P	p
E	e	R	r
G	g	S	s
H	h	T	t
I	i	U	u
L	l	W	w
M	m	Y	y

==== "Enriched" alphabet ====
In 1971, the alphabet was expanded to make room for loans, especially family names from Spanish and English.

Majuscule	Minuscule	Majuscule	Minuscule
A	a	Ng	ng
B	b	Ñ	ñ
C	c	O	o
Ch	ch	P	p
D	d	Q	q
E	e	R	r
F	f	Rr	rr
G	g	S	s
H	h	T	t
I	i	U	u
J	j	V	v
K	k	W	w
L	l	X	x
Ll	ll	Y	y
M	m	Z	z
N	n		

==== Revised alphabet ====
In 1987, the Department of Education, Culture and Sports issued a memo stating that the Philippine alphabet had changed from the 1971 version to a new 28-letter alphabet. The Spanish digraphs ch, ll, and rr were deleted, since they can be made from the existing letters, but the digraph ng, needed for native Tagalog words, was retained in the alphabet. The additional letters beyond the 26-letter English alphabet are: ñ, ng.

Majuscule	Minuscule	Majuscule	Minuscule
A	a	Ñ	ñ
B	b	Ng	ng
C	c	O	o
D	d	P	p
E	e	Q	q
F	f	R	r
G	g	S	s
H	h	T	t
I	i	U	u
J	j	V	v
K	k	W	w
L	l	X	x
M	m	Y	y
N	n	Z	z

==== ng and mga ====
The genitive marker ng and the plural marker mga (e.g. Iyan ang mga damít ko. (Those are my clothes)) are abbreviations that are pronounced nang [naŋ] and mangá [mɐˈŋa]. Ng, in most cases, roughly translates to "of" (ex. Siyá ay kapatíd ng nanay ko. She is the sibling of my mother) while nang usually means "when" or can describe how something is done or to what extent (equivalent to the suffix -ly in English adverbs), among other uses.

- Nang si Hudas ay nadulás.—When Judas slipped.
- Gumising siya nang maaga.—He woke up early.
- Gumalíng nang todo si Juan dahil nag-ensayo siyá.—Juan greatly improved because he practiced.

In the first example, nang is used in lieu of the word noong (when; Noong si Hudas ay madulás). In the second, nang describes that the person woke up (gumising) early (maaga); gumising nang maaga. In the third, nang described up to what extent that Juan improved (gumalíng), which is "greatly" (nang todo). In the latter two examples, the ligature na and its variants -ng and -g may also be used (Gumising na maaga/Maagang gumising; Gumalíng na todo/Todong gumalíng).

The longer nang may also have other uses, such as a ligature that joins a repeated word:

- Naghintáy sila nang naghintáy.—They kept on waiting" (a closer calque: "They were waiting and waiting.")

=== pô/hô and opò/ohò ===
The words pô/hô originated from the word "Panginoon." and "Poon." ("Lord."). When combined with the basic affirmative Oo "yes" (from Proto-Malayo-Polynesian *heqe), the resulting forms are opò and ohò.

"Pô" and "opò" are specifically used to denote a high level of respect when addressing older persons of close affinity like parents, relatives, teachers and family friends. "Hô" and "ohò" are generally used to politely address older neighbours, strangers, public officials, bosses and nannies, and may suggest a distance in societal relationship and respect determined by the addressee's social rank and not their age. However, "pô" and "opò" can be used in any case in order to express an elevation of respect.

- Example: "Pakitapon namán pô/hô yung basura." ("Please throw away the trash.")

Used in the affirmative:

- Ex: "Gutóm ka na ba?" "Opò/Ohò". ("Are you hungry yet?" "Yes.")

Pô/Hô may also be used in negation.

- Ex: "Hindi ko pô/hô alám 'yan." ("I don't know that.")

== Vocabulary and borrowed words ==
Tagalog vocabulary is mostly of native Austronesian or Tagalog origin, such as most of the words that end with the diphthong -iw, (e.g. giliw) and words that exhibit reduplication (e.g. halo-halo, patpat, etc.). Besides inherited cognates, this also accounts for innovations in Tagalog vocabulary, especially traditional ones within its dialects. Tagalog has also incorporated many Spanish and English loanwords; the necessity of which increases in more technical parlance.

In precolonial times, Trade Malay was widely known and spoken throughout Maritime Southeast Asia, contributing a significant number of Malay vocabulary into the Tagalog language. Malay loanwords, identifiable or not, may often already be considered native as these have existed in the language before colonisation.

Tagalog also includes loanwords from Indian languages (Sanskrit and Tamil, mostly through Malay), Chinese languages (mostly Hokkien, followed by Cantonese, Mandarin, etc.), Japanese, Arabic and Persian.

English has borrowed some words from Tagalog, such as abaca, barong, balisong, boondocks, jeepney, Manila hemp, pancit, ylang-ylang, and yaya. Some of these loanwords are more often used in Philippine English.

Other examples of Tagalog words used in English
Example	Definition
boondocks	meaning "rural" or "back country", borrowed through American soldiers stationed in the Philippines in the Philippine–American War as a corruption of the Tagalog word bundok, which means "mountain"
cogon	a type of grass, used for thatching, came from the Tagalog word kugon (a species of tall grass)
ylang-ylang	a tree whose fragrant flowers are used in perfumes
abacá	a type of hemp fiber made from a plant in the banana family, came from the Tagalog word abaká
Manila hemp	a light brown cardboard material used for folders and paper, usually made from abaca hemp, from Manila, the capital of the Philippines
capiz	a type of marine mollusc also known as a "windowpane oyster" used to make windows

Tagalog has contributed several words to Philippine Spanish, like barangay (from balan͠gay, meaning barrio), the abacá, cogon, palay, dalaga etc.

== Taglish (Englog) ==
Taglish and Englog are names given to a mix of English and Tagalog. The amount of English vs. Tagalog varies from the occasional use of English loan words to changing language in mid-sentence. Such code-switching is prevalent throughout the Philippines and in various languages of the Philippines other than Tagalog.

Code-mixing also entails the use of foreign words that are "Filipinized" by reforming them using Filipino rules, such as verb conjugations. Users typically use Filipino or English words, whichever comes to mind first or whichever is easier to use.

Magshoshopping kami sa mall. Sino ba ang magdadrive sa shopping center?

Translation:

We will go shopping at the mall. Who will drive to the shopping center?

Urbanites are the most likely to speak like this.

The practice is common in television, radio, and print media as well. Advertisements from companies like Wells Fargo, Wal-Mart, Albertsons, McDonald's and Western Union have contained Taglish.

=== Cognates with other Philippine languages ===
Tagalog word	Meaning	Language of cognate	Spelling
bakit	why (from bakin + at)	Kapampangan	obakit
akyát	climb/step up	Kapampangan	ukyát/mukyát
bundók	mountain	Kapampangan	bunduk
at	and	Kapampangan; Pangasinan	at tan
aso	dog	Kapampangan and Maguindanaon; Pangasinan, Ilocano, and Maranao	asu aso
huwág	don't	Pangasinan	ag
tayo	we (inc.)	Pangasinan; Ilocano; Kapampangan; Tausug; Maguindanao; Maranao; Ivatan; Ibanag; Yogad; Gaddang; Tboli	sikatayo datayo ikatamu kitaniyu tanu tano yaten sittam sikitam ikkanetam tekuy
itó, nitó	this, its	Ilocano; Bicolano	to iyó/ini
ng	of	Cebuano; Hiligaynon; Waray; Kapampangan; Pangasinan; Bicolano; Ilocano	sa/og sang/sing han/hin/san/sin ning na kan/nin a
araw	sun; day	Visayan languages Kapampangan; Pangasinan; Bicolano (Central/East Miraya) and Ilocano; Rinconada Bikol; Ivatan; Ibanag; Yogad; Gaddang; Tboli	adlaw aldo agew aldaw aldəw araw aggaw agaw aw kdaw
ang	definite article	Visayan languages (except Waray); Bicolano and Waray	ang an

== Comparisons with Austronesian languages ==
Below is a chart of Tagalog and a number of other Austronesian languages comparing thirteen words.

Tagalog	isá	dalawá	tatló	apat	tao	bahay	aso	niyóg	araw	bago	táyo	anó	apóy
Tombulu (Minahasa)	esa	zua/rua	telu	epat	tou	walé	asu	po'po'	endo	weru	kai/kita	apa	api
Central Bikol	sarô	duwa	tulo	apat	tawo	harong	ayam	niyog	aldaw	bâgo	kita	ano	kalayo
East Miraya Bikol	əsad	duwa	tulo	əpat	taw	balay	ayam/ido	nuyog	aldaw	bâgo	kita	unu/uno	kalayō
Rinconada Bikol	əsad	darwā	tolō	əpat	tawō	baləy	ayam	noyog	aldəw	bāgo	kitā	onō	kalayō
Hiligaynon	isá	duhá	tatló	apat	tawo	baláy	ido	lubí	adlaw	bag-o	kitá	anó	kalayo
Cebuano	usá	duhá	tuló	upát	tawo	baláy	iro	lubí	adlaw	bag-o	kitá	unsa/kinsa	kalayo
Waray	usá	duhá	tuló	upát	tawo	baláy	ayám	lubí	adlaw	bag-o	kitá	anó/anyá/nano	kalayo
Kinaray-a	sara	darwa	tuló	upát	tawo	baláy	ayam	niyog	adlaw	bag-o	kitá	anó	kalayo
Akeanon	isaea/sambilog	daywa	tuló	ap-at	tawo	baeay	ayam	niyog	adlaw	bag-o	kitá	anó	kaeayo
Tausug	isa/hambuuk	duwa	tu	upat	tau	bay	iru'	niyug	adlaw	ba-gu	kitaniyu	unu	kayu
Maguindanao	isa	dua	telu	pat	tau	walay	asu	niyug	gay	bagu	tanu	ngin	apuy
Maranao	isa	dowa	t'lo	phat	taw	walay	aso	neyog	gawi'e	bago	tano	tonaa	apoy
Kapampangan	isa/metung	adwa	atlu	apat	tau	bale	asu	ngungut	aldo	bayu	ikatamu	nanu	api
Pangasinan	sakey	dua/duara	talo/talora	apat/apatira	too	abong	aso	niyog	ageo/agew	balo	sikatayo	anto	pool
Ilocano	maysa	dua	tallo	uppat	tao	balay	aso	niog	aldaw	baro	datayo	ania	apoy
Ivatan	asa	dadowa	tatdo	apat	tao	vahay	chito	niyoy	araw	va-yo	yaten	ango	apoy
Ibanag	tadday	dua	tallu	appa'	tolay	balay	kitu	niuk	aggaw	bagu	sittam	anni	afi
Yogad	tata	addu	tallu	appat	tolay	binalay	atu	iyyog	agaw	bagu	sikitam	gani	afuy
Gaddang	antet	addwa	tallo	appat	tolay	balay	atu	ayog	aw	bawu	ikkanetam	sanenay	afuy
Tboli	sotu	lewu	tlu	fat	tau	gunu	ohu	lefo	kdaw	lomi	tekuy	tedu	ofih
Kadazan	iso	duvo	tohu	apat	tuhun	hamin	tasu	piasau	tadau	vagu	tokou	onu	tapui
Indonesian/Malay	satu	dua	tiga	empat	orang	rumah/balai	anjing	kelapa/nyiur	hari	baru/baharu	kita	apa	api
Javanese	siji	loro	telu	papat	uwong	omah/bale	asu	klapa/kambil	hari/dina/dinten	anyar/enggal	kita	apa/anu	geni
Acehnese	sa	duwa	lhèë	peuët	ureuëng	rumoh/balèë	asèë	u	uroë	barô	(geu)tanyoë	peuë	apuy
Lampung	sai	khua	telu	pak	jelema	lamban	asu	nyiwi	khani	baru	kham	api	apui
Buginese	se'di	dua	tellu	eppa'	tau	bola	asu	kaluku	esso	baru	idi'	aga	api
Batak	sada	dua	tolu	opat	halak	jabu	biang	harambiri	ari	baru	hita	aha	api
Minangkabau	ciek	duo	tigo	ampek	urang	rumah	anjiang	karambia	ari	baru	kito	apo	api
Tetum	ida	rua	tolu	haat	ema	uma	asu	nuu	loron	foun	ita	saida	ahi
Māori	tahi	rua	toru	wha	tangata	whare	kuri	kokonati	ra	hou	taua	aha	ahi
Tuvaluan	tasi	lua	tolu	fá	toko	fale	kuri	moku	aso	fou	tāua	ā	afi
Hawaiian	kahi	lua	kolu	hā	kanaka	hale	'īlio	niu	ao	hou	kākou	aha	ahi
Banjarese	asa	dua	talu	ampat	urang	rumah	hadupan	kalapa	hari	hanyar	kita	apa	api
Malagasy	isa	roa	telo	efatra	olona	trano	alika	voanio	andro	vaovao	isika	inona	afo
Dusun	iso	duo	tolu	apat	tulun	walai	tasu	piasau	tadau	wagu	tokou	onu/nu	tapui
Iban	sa/san	duan	dangku	dangkan	orang	rumah	ukui/uduk	nyiur	hari	baru	kitai	nama	api
Melanau	satu	dua	telou	empat	apah	lebok	asou	nyior	lau	baew	teleu	nama	apui

== Religious literature ==
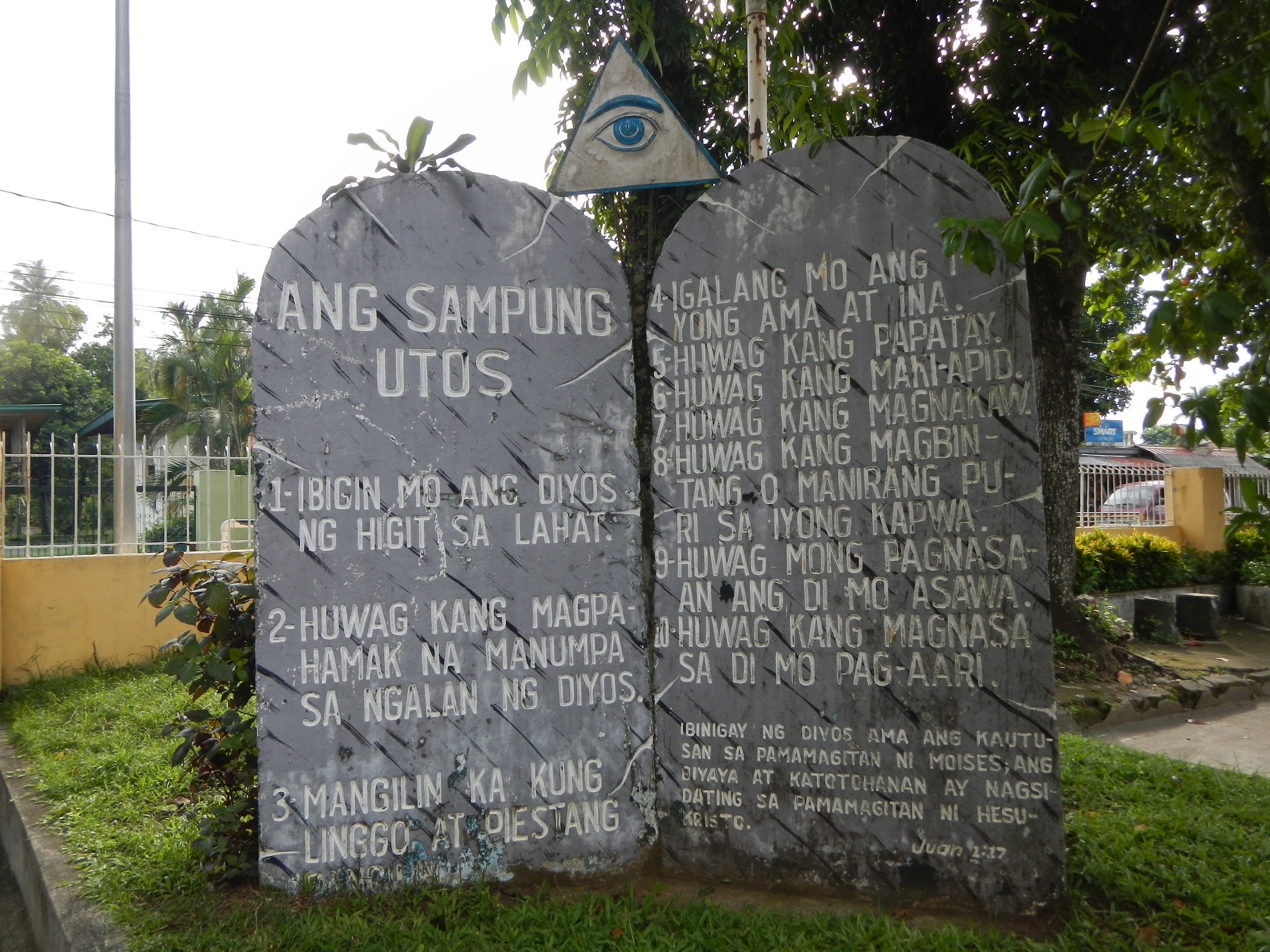
The Ten Commandments in Tagalog.

Religious literature remains one of the most dynamic components to Tagalog literature. The first Bible in Tagalog, then called Ang Biblia ("the Bible"), afterwards called Ang Dating Biblia ("the Old Bible"), was published in 1905. In 1970, the Philippine Bible Society translated the Bible into modern Tagalog. Even before the Second Vatican Council, devotional materials in Tagalog had been in circulation. There are at least four widely-circulating Tagalog translations of the Bible:

- Magandang Balita Biblia (a parallel translation of the Good News Bible), an ecumenical version used liturgically by the Philippine Catholic Church;
- Bibliya ng Sambayanang Pilipino
- 1905 Ang Biblia, more popular with Protestants
- Bagong Sanlibutang Salin ng Banal na Kasulatan (New World Translation of the Holy Scriptures), exclusive to the Jehovah's Witnesses

When the Second Vatican Council, (specifically the Sacrosanctum Concilium) permitted the universal prayers to be translated into vernacular languages, the Catholic Bishops' Conference of the Philippines was one of the first to translate the Roman Missal into Tagalog. The Roman Missal in Tagalog was published as early as 1982. In 2012, the Catholic Bishops' Conference of the Philippines revised the 41-year-old liturgy with an English version of the Roman Missal, and later translated it in the vernacular to several native languages in the Philippines. For instance, in 2024, the Roman Catholic Diocese of Malolos uses the Tagalog translation of the Roman Missal entitled "Ang Aklat ng Mabuting Balita."

Jehovah's Witnesses were printing Tagalog literature at least as early as 1941, and The Watchtower (the primary magazine of Jehovah's Witnesses) has been published in Tagalog since September 1947. As of 2014,new releases are regularly released simultaneously in a number of languages, including Tagalog, while the official website JW.org also has Tagalog publications available. The revised bible edition, the New World Translation of the Holy Scriptures, was released in Tagalog in 2019 and is distributed without charge in both printed and online versions.

Tagalog is quite a stable language, and very few revisions have been made to Catholic Bible translations. Also, as Protestantism in the Philippines is newer, liturgical prayers tend to be more ecumenical.

== Example texts ==
=== Lord's Prayer ===
In Tagalog, the Lord's Prayer is known by its incipit, Amá Namin (literally, "Our Father").

Amá namin, sumasalangit Ka,
Sambahín ang ngalan Mo.
Mapasaamin ang kaharián Mo.
Sundín ang loób Mo,
Dito sa lupà, gaya nang sa langit.
Bigyán Mo kamí ngayón ng aming kakanin sa araw-araw,
At patawarin Mo kamí sa aming mga salà,
Para nang pagpápatawad namin,
Sa nagkakasalà sa amin;
At huwág Mo kamíng ipahintulot sa tuksô,
At iadyâ Mo kamí sa lahát ng masamâ.
[Sapagkát sa Inyó ang kaharián, at ang kapangyarihan,
At ang kaluwálhatian, ngayón, at magpakailanman.]
Amen.

The same text, in Baybayin script, is as follows.

ᜀᜋ ᜈᜋᜒᜈ᜔᜵ ᜐᜓᜋᜐᜎᜅᜒᜆ᜔ ᜃ᜵
ᜐᜋ᜔ᜊᜑᜒᜈ᜔ ᜀᜅ᜔ ᜅᜎᜈ᜔ ᜋᜓ᜶
ᜋᜉᜐᜀᜋᜒᜈ᜔ ᜀᜅ᜔ ᜃᜑᜇᜒᜀᜈ᜔ ᜋᜓ᜶
ᜐᜓᜈ᜔ᜇᜒᜈ᜔ ᜀᜅ᜔ ᜎᜓᜂᜊ᜔ ᜋᜓ᜶
ᜇᜒᜆᜓ ᜐ ᜎᜓᜉ᜵ ᜄᜌ ᜈᜅ᜔ ᜐ ᜎᜅᜒᜆ᜔᜶
ᜊᜒᜄ᜔ᜌᜈ᜔ ᜋᜓ ᜃᜋᜒ ᜈᜅ᜔ ᜀᜋᜒᜅ᜔ ᜃᜃᜈᜒᜈ᜔ ᜐ ᜀᜇᜏ᜔ᜀᜇᜏ᜔᜵
ᜀᜆ᜔ ᜉᜆᜏᜇᜒᜈ᜔ ᜋᜓ ᜃᜋᜒ ᜐ ᜀᜋᜒᜅ᜔ ᜋᜅ ᜐᜎ᜵
ᜉᜇ ᜈᜅ᜔ ᜉᜄ᜔ᜉᜉᜆᜏᜇ᜔ ᜈᜋᜒᜈ᜔᜵
ᜐ ᜈᜄ᜔ᜃᜃᜐᜎ ᜐ ᜀᜋᜒᜈ᜔;
ᜀᜆ᜔ ᜑᜓᜏᜄ᜔ ᜋᜓ ᜃᜋᜒᜅ᜔ ᜁᜉᜑᜒᜈ᜔ᜆᜓᜎᜓᜆ᜔ ᜐ ᜆᜓᜃ᜔ᜐᜓ᜵
ᜀᜆ᜔ ᜁᜀᜇ᜔ᜌ ᜋᜓ ᜃᜋᜒ ᜐ ᜎᜑᜆ᜔ ᜈᜅ᜔ ᜋᜐᜋ᜶
[ᜐᜉᜄ᜔ᜃᜆ᜔ ᜐ ᜁᜈ᜔ᜌᜓ ᜀᜅ᜔ ᜃᜑᜇᜒᜀᜈ᜔᜵ ᜀᜆ᜔ ᜀᜅ᜔ ᜃᜉᜅ᜔ᜌᜇᜒᜑᜈ᜔᜵
ᜀᜆ᜔ ᜀᜅ᜔ ᜃᜎᜓᜏᜎ᜔ᜑᜆᜒᜀᜈ᜔᜵ ᜅᜌᜓᜈ᜔᜵ ᜀᜆ᜔ ᜋᜄ᜔ᜉᜃᜁᜎᜈ᜔ᜋᜈ᜔᜶]
ᜀᜋᜒᜈ᜔᜶

=== Universal Declaration of Human Rights ===
This is Article 1 of the Universal Declaration of Human Rights (Pangkalahatáng Pagpapahayág ng Karapatáng Pantao)

Tagalog (Latin)

Bawat tao'y isinilang na may layà at magkakapantáy ang tagláy na dangál at karapatán. Silá'y pinagkalooban ng pangangatwiran at budhî, at dapat magpálagayan ang isá't-isá sa diwà ng pagkákapatiran.

Tagalog (Baybayin)

ᜊᜏᜆ᜔ ᜆᜂᜌ᜔ ᜁᜐᜒᜈᜒᜎᜅ᜔ ᜈ ᜋᜌ᜔ ᜎᜌ ᜀᜆ᜔ ᜋᜄ᜔ᜃᜃᜉᜈ᜔ᜆᜌ᜔ ᜀᜅ᜔ ᜆᜄ᜔ᜎᜌ᜔ ᜈ ᜇᜅᜎ᜔ ᜀᜆ᜔ ᜃᜇᜉᜆᜈ᜔᜶ ᜐᜒᜎᜌ᜔ ᜉᜒᜈᜄ᜔ᜃᜎᜓᜂᜊᜈ᜔ ᜈᜅ᜔ ᜃᜆ᜔ᜏᜒᜇᜈ᜔ ᜀᜆ᜔ ᜊᜓᜇᜑᜒ᜵ ᜀᜆ᜔ ᜇᜉᜆ᜔ ᜋᜄ᜔ᜉᜎᜄᜌᜈ᜔ ᜀᜅ᜔ ᜁᜐᜆ᜔ ᜁᜐ ᜐ ᜇᜒᜏ ᜈᜅ᜔ ᜉᜄ᜔ᜃᜃᜉᜆᜒᜇᜈ᜔᜶

English

All human beings are born free and equal in dignity and rights. They are endowed with reason and conscience and should act towards one another in a spirit of brotherhood.

=== Numbers ===
Numbers (mga bilang/mga numero) in Tagalog follow two systems. The first consists of native Tagalog words and the other are Spanish-derived. (This may be compared to other East Asian languages, except with the second set of numbers borrowed from Spanish instead of Chinese.) For example, when a person refers to the number "seven", it can be translated into Tagalog as "pitó" or "siyete" (Spanish: siete).

Number	Cardinal	Spanish-derived (Original Spanish)	Ordinal
0	sero / walâ (lit. 'null')	sero (cero)	–
1	isá	uno (uno)	una
2	dalawá [dalaua]	dos (dos)	pangalawá / ikalawá
3	tatló	tres (tres)	pangatló / ikatló
4	apat	kuwatro (cuatro)	pang-apat / ikaapat (In standard Filipino orthography, "ika" and the number-word are never hyphenated.)
5	limá	singko (cinco)	panlimá / ikalimá
6	anim	seis (seis)	pang-anim / ikaanim
7	pitó	siyete (siete)	pampitó / ikapitó
8	waló	otso (ocho)	pangwaló / ikawaló
9	siyám	nuwebe (nueve)	pansiyám / ikasiyám
10	sampû / pû (archaic) [sang puwo]	diyés (diez)	pansampû / ikasampû (or ikapû in some literary compositions)
11	labíng-isá	onse (once)	panlabíng-isá / pang-onse / ikalabíng-isá
12	labíndalawá	dose (doce)	panlabíndalawá / pandose / ikalabíndalawá
13	labíntatló	trese (trece)	panlabíntatló / pantrese / ikalabíntatló
14	labíng-apat	katorse (catorce)	panlabíng-apat / pangkatorse / ikalabíng-apat
15	labínlimá	kinse (quince)	panlabínlimá / pangkinse / ikalabínlimá
16	labíng-anim	disisais (dieciséis)	panlabíng-anim / pandyes-sais / ikalabíng-anim
17	labímpitó	disisiyete (diecisiete)	panlabímpitó / pandyes-syete / ikalabímpitó
18	labíngwaló	disiotso (dieciocho)	panlabíngwaló / pandyes-otso / ikalabíngwaló
19	labinsiyám / labins'yam / labingsiyam	disinuwebe (diecinueve)	panlabinsiyám / pandyes-nwebe / ikalabinsiyám
20	dalawampû	beynte (veinte)	pandalawampû / ikadalawampû (rare literary variant: ikalawampû)
21	dalawampú't isá	beynte y uno / beynte'y uno (veintiuno)	pang-dalawampú't isá / ikalawamapú't isá
30	tatlumpû	treynta (treinta)	pantatlumpû / ikatatlumpû (rare literary variant: ikatlumpû)
40	apatnapû	kuwarenta (cuarenta)	pang-apatnapû / ikaapatnapû
50	limampû	singkuwenta (cincuenta)	panlimampû / ikalimampû
60	animnapû	sesenta (sesenta)	pang-animnapû / ikaanimnapû
70	pitumpû	setenta (setenta)	pampitumpû / ikapitumpû
80	walumpû	otsenta (ochenta)	pangwalumpû / ikawalumpû
90	siyamnapû	nobenta (noventa)	pansiyamnapû / ikasiyamnapû
100	sándaán / daán	siyen (cien)	pan(g)-(i)sándaán / ikasándaán (rare literary variant: ikaisándaán)
200	dalawandaán	dosyentos (doscientos)	pandalawándaán / ikadalawandaan (rare literary variant: ikalawándaán)
300	tatlóndaán	tresyentos (trescientos)	pantatlóndaán / ikatatlondaan (rare literary variant: ikatlóndaán)
400	apat na raán	kuwatrosyentos (cuatrocientos)	pang-apat na raán / ikaapat na raán
500	limándaán	kinyentos (quinientos)	panlimándaán / ikalimándaán
600	anim na raán	seissiyentos (seiscientos)	pang-anim na raán / ikaanim na raán
700	pitondaán	setesyentos (setecientos)	pampitóndaán / ikapitóndaán (or ikapitóng raán)
800	walóndaán	otsosyentos (ochocientos)	pangwalóndaán / ikawalóndaán (or ikawalóng raán)
900	siyám na raán	nobesyentos (novecientos)	pansiyám na raán / ikasiyám na raán
1,000	sánlibo / libo	mil / uno mil (mil)	pan(g)-(i)sánlibo / ikasánlibo
2,000	dalawánlibo	dos mil (dos mil)	pangalawáng libo / ikalawánlibo
10,000	sánlaksâ / sampúng libo	diyes mil (diez mil)	pansampúng libo / ikasampúng libo
20,000	dalawanlaksâ / dalawampúng libo	beynte mil (veinte mil)	pangalawampúng libo / ikalawampúng libo
100,000	sangyutá / sandaáng libo	siyento mil (cien mil)	
200,000	dalawangyutá / dalawandaáng libo	dosyentos mil (doscientos mil)	
1,000,000	sang-angaw / sangmilyón	milyón (un millón)	
2,000,000	dalawang-angaw / dalawang milyón	dos milyónes (dos millones)	
10,000,000	sangkatì / sampung milyón	diyes milyónes (diez millones)	
100,000,000	sambahalà / sampúngkatì / sandaáng milyón	siyen milyónes (cien millones)	
1,000,000,000	sanggatós / sang-atós / sambilyón	bilyón / mil milyón (un billón (US), mil millones, millardo)	
1,000,000,000,000	sang-ipaw / santrilyón	trilyón / bilyón (un trillón (US), un billón)	

Number	English	Spanish	Ordinal / Fraction / Cardinal
1st	first	primer, primero, primera	una / ikaisá
2nd	second	segundo/a	ikalawá
3rd	third	tercero/a	ikatló
4th	fourth	cuarto/a	ikaapat
5th	fifth	quinto/a	ikalimá
6th	sixth	sexto/a	ikaanim
7th	seventh	séptimo/a	ikapitó
8th	eighth	octavo/a	ikawaló
9th	ninth	noveno/a	ikasiyám
10th	tenth	décimo/a	ikasampû
1/2	half	medio/a, mitad	kalahatì
1/4	one quarter	cuarto	kapat
3/5	three fifths	tres quintas partes	tatlóng-kalimá
2/3	two thirds	dos tercios	dalawáng-katló
1 1/2	one and a half	uno y medio	isá't kalahatì
2 2/3	two and two thirds	dos y dos tercios	dalawá't dalawáng-katló
0.5	zero point five	cero punto cinco, cero coma cinco, cero con cinco	salapî / limá hinatì sa sampû
0.05	zero point zero five	cero punto cero cinco, cero coma cero cinco, cero con cero cinco	bagól / limá hinatì sa sandaán
0.005	zero point zero zero five	cero punto cero cero cinco, cero coma cero cero cinco, cero con cero cero cinco	limá hinatì sa sanlibo
1.25	one point two five	uno punto veinticinco, uno coma veinticinco, uno con veinticinco	isá't dalawampú't limá hinatì sa sampû
2.025	two point zero two five	dos punto cero veinticinco, dos coma cero veinticinco, dos con cero veinticinco	dalawá't dalawampú't limá hinatì sa sanlibo
25%	twenty-five percent	veinticinco por ciento	dalawampú't-limáng bahagdán
50%	fifty percent	cincuenta por ciento	limampúng bahagdán
75%	seventy-five percent	setenta y cinco por ciento	pitumpú't-limáng bahagdán

=== Months and days ===
Months and days in Tagalog are also localised forms of Spanish months and days. "Month" in Tagalog is buwán (also the word for moon) and "day" is araw (the word also means sun). Unlike Spanish, however, months and days in Tagalog are always capitalised.

Month	Original Spanish	Tagalog (abbreviation)
January	enero	Enero (Ene.)
February	febrero	Pebrero (Peb.)
March	marzo	Marso (Mar.)
April	abril	Abríl (Abr.)
May	mayo	Mayo (Mayo)
June	junio	Hunyo (Hun.)
July	julio	Hulyo (Hul.)
August	agosto	Agosto (Ago.)
September	septiembre	Setyembre (Set.)
October	octubre	Oktubre (Okt.)
November	noviembre	Nobyembre (Nob.)
December	diciembre	Disyembre (Dis.)

Day	Original Spanish	Tagalog
Sunday	domingo	Linggó
Monday	lunes	Lunes
Tuesday	martes	Martes
Wednesday	miércoles	Miyérkules / Myérkules
Thursday	jueves	Huwebes / Hwebes
Friday	viernes	Biyernes / Byernes
Saturday	sábado	Sábado

=== Time ===
Time expressions in Tagalog are also Tagalized forms of the corresponding Spanish. "Time" in Tagalog is panahón or oras.

Time	English	Original Spanish	Tagalog
1 hour	one hour	una hora	Isáng oras
2 min	two minutes	dos minutos	Dalawáng sandalî/minuto
3 sec	three seconds	tres segundos	Tatlóng saglít/segundo
	morning	mañana	Umaga
	afternoon	tarde	Hápon
	evening/night	noche	Gabí
	noon	mediodía	Tanghalì
	midnight	medianoche	Hatinggabí
1:00 am	one in the morning	una de la mañana	Ika-isá ng umaga
7:00 pm	seven at night	siete de la noche	Ikapitó ng gabí
1:15	quarter past one one-fifteen	una y cuarto	Kapat makalipas ika-isá Labínlimá makalipas ika-isá Apatnapú't-limá bago mag-ikalawá Tatlong-kapat bago mag-ikalawá
2:30	half past two two-thirty half-way to/of three	dos y media	Kalahatì makalipas ikalawá Tatlumpû makalipas ikalawá Tatlumpû bago mag-ikatló Kalahatì bago mag-ikatló
3:45	three-forty-five quarter to/of four	tres y cuarenta y cinco cuatro menos cuarto	Tatlóng-kapat makalipas ikatló Apatnapú't-limá makalipas ikatló Labínlimá bago mag-ikaapat Kapat bago mag-ikaapat
4:25	four-twenty-five twenty-five past four	cuatro y veinticinco	Dalawampú't-limá makalipas ikaapat Tatlumpú't-limá bago mag-ikaapat
5:35	five-thirty-five twenty-five to/of six	cinco y treinta y cinco seis menos veinticinco	Tatlumpú't-limá makalipas ikalimá Dalawampú't-limá bago mag-ikaanim

== Common phrases ==
English	Tagalog (with Pronunciation)
Filipino	Pilipino [pɪlɪˈpino]
English	Inglés [ʔɪŋˈɡlɛs]
Tagalog	Tagálog [tɐˈɡaloɡ]
Spanish	Espanyol/Español/Kastila [ʔɛspɐnˈjol]
What is your name?	Anó ang pangálan ninyó/nilá*? (plural or polite) [ʔɐˈno: ʔaŋ pɐˈŋalan nɪnˈjo], Anó ang pangálan mo? (singular) [ʔɐˈno: ʔaŋ pɐˈŋalan mo]
How are you?	Kumustá [kʊmʊsˈta] (modern), Anó pô ang lagáy ninyó/nilá? (old use) [ʔɐˈno poː ʔɐŋ lɐˈgaɪ̯ nɪnˈjo]
Knock knock	Tao pô [ˈtɐʔo poʔ]
Good day!	Magandáng araw! [mɐɡɐnˈdaŋ ˈʔɐɾaʊ̯]
Good morning!	Magandáng umaga! [mɐɡɐnˈdaŋ ʔʊˈmaɡɐ]
Good noontime! (from 11 a.m. to 1 p.m.)	Magandáng tanghalì! [mɐɡɐnˈdaŋ tɐŋˈhalɛʔ]
Good afternoon! (from 1 p.m. to 6:00 p.m.)	Magandáng hapon! [mɐɡɐnˈdaŋ ˈhɐpon]
Good evening!	Magandáng gabí! [mɐɡɐnˈdaŋ ɡɐˈbɛ]
Good-bye	Paálam [pɐˈʔalɐm]
Please	Depending on the nature of the verb, either pakí- [pɐˈki] or makí- [mɐˈki] is attached as a prefix to a verb. Ngâ [ŋaʔ] is optionally added after the verb to increase politeness. (e.g. Pakipasa ngâ ang tinapay. ("Can you pass the bread, please?"))
Thank you	Salamat [sɐˈlamɐt]
This one	Itó [ʔɪˈto], sometimes pronounced [ʔɛˈto] (literally—"it", "this")
That one (close to addressee)	Iyán [ʔɪˈjan]
That one (far from speaker and addressee)	Iyón [ʔɪˈjon]
Here	Dito ['dito], heto ['hɛto], simplified to eto [ˈʔɛto] ("Here it is")
Right there	Diyán [dʒan], (h)ayán [(h)ɐˈjan], diyaán [dʒɐʔˈan] ("There it is")
Over there	Doón [doˈʔon], ayón [ɐˈjon] ("There it is")
How much?	Magkano? [mɐɡˈkano]
How many?	Ilán? [ʔɪˈlan]
Yes	Oo [ˈʔoʔo] Opò [ˈʔopoʔ] or ohò [ˈʔohoʔ] (formal/polite form)
No	Hindî [hɪnˈdɛʔ] (at the end of a pause or sentence), often shortened to dî [dɛʔ] Hindî pô [hɪnˈdiː poʔ] (formal/polite form)
I don't know	Hindî ko alám [hɪnˈdiː ko ʔɐˈlam] Very informal: Ewan [ˈʔɛwɐn], archaic aywan [ʔaɪ̯ˈwan] (closest English equivalent: colloquial dismissive 'Whatever' or 'Dunno')
Sorry	Pasénsiya pô [pɐˈsɛnʃɐ poʔ] (literally from the word "patience") or paumanhín pô [pɐʔʊmɐnˈhin poʔ], patawad pô [pɐˈtawɐd poʔ] (literally—"asking your forgiveness")
Because	Kasí [kɐˈsɛ] or dahil ['dahɛl]
Hurry!	Dalî! [dɐˈliʔ], Bilís! [bɪˈlis]
Again	Mulî [mʊˈˈliʔ], ulít [ʔʊˈlɛt]
I don't understand	Hindî ko naíintindihán [hɪnˈdiː ko nɐˌʔiʔɪntɪndɪˈhan] or Hindî ko naúunawáan [hɪnˈdiː ko nɐˌʔuʔʊnɐˈwaʔan]
What?	Anó? [ʔɐˈno]
Where?	Saán? [sɐˈʔan], Nasaán? [ˌnɐsɐˈʔan] (literally – "Where at?")
Why?	Bakit? [ˈbakɛt]
When?	Kailán? [kaɪ̯ˈlan], [kɐʔɪˈlan], or [ˈkɛlan] (literally—"In what order?/"At what count?")
How?	Paánó? [pɐˈʔano] (literally—"By what?")
Where's the bathroom?	Nasaán ang banyo? [ˌnɐsɐˈʔan ʔɐŋ ˈbanjo]
Generic toast	Mabuhay! [mɐˈbuhaɪ̯] (literally—"long live")
Do you speak English?	Marunong ka bang magsalitâ ng Inglés? [mɐˈɾunoŋ kɐ baŋ mɐɡsɐlɪˈtaː nɐŋ ʔɪŋˈɡlɛs] Marunong pô ba kayóng magsalitâ ng Inglés? [mɐˈɾunoŋ poː ba kɐˈjoŋ mɐɡsɐlɪˈtaː nɐŋ ʔɪŋˈɡlɛs] (polite version for elders and strangers); Marunong ka bang mag-Inglés? [mɐˈɾunoŋ kɐ baŋ mɐɡʔɪŋˈɡlɛs] (short form); Marunong pô ba kayóng mag-Inglés? [mɐˈɾunoŋ poː ba kɐˈjoŋ mɐɡʔɪŋˈɡlɛs] (short form, polite version for elders and strangers)
It is fun to live.	Masayá ang mabuhay! [mɐsɐˈja ʔɐŋ mɐˈbuhaɪ̯] or Masaya'ng mabuhay (contracted version)

*Pronouns such as niyó (2nd person plural) and nilá (3rd person plural) are used on a single 2nd person in polite or formal language. See Tagalog grammar.

=== Proverbs ===
Ang hindî marunong lumingón sa pinánggalingan ay hindî makaráratíng sa paroroonan.

(— José Rizal)

One who knows not how to look back to whence he came will never get to where he is going.

Unang kagát, tinapay pa rin.
First bite, still bread.
All fluff, no substance.

Tao ka nang humaráp, bilang tao kitáng haharapin.
You reach me as a human, I will treat you as a human and never act as a traitor.
(A proverb in Southern Tagalog that has made people aware of the significance of sincerity in Tagalog communities.)

Hulí man daw (raw) at magalíng, nakáhahábol pa rin.
If one is behind but capable, one will still be able to catch up.

Magbirô ka na sa lasíng, huwág lang sa bagong gising.
Make fun of someone drunk, if you must, but never one who has just awakened.

Aanhín pa ang damó kung patáy na ang kabayò?
What use is the grass if the horse is already dead?

Ang sakít ng kalingkingan, damdám ng buóng katawán.
The pain in the pinkie is felt by the whole body.
In a group, if one goes down, the rest follow.

Nasa hulí ang pagsisisi.
Regret is always in the end.

Pagkáhabà-habà man ng prusisyón, sa simbahan pa rin ang tulóy.
The procession may stretch on and on, but it still ends up at the church.
(In romance: refers to how certain people are destined to be married. In general: refers to how some things are inevitable, no matter how long you try to postpone it.)

Kung 'dî mádaán sa santóng dasalan, daanin sa santóng paspasan.
If it cannot be got through holy prayer, get it through blessed force.
(In romance and courting: santóng paspasan literally means 'holy speeding' and is a euphemism for sexual intercourse. It refers to the two styles of courting by Filipino boys: one is the traditional, protracted, restrained manner favored by older generations, which often featured serenades and manual labor for the girl's family; the other is upfront seduction, which may lead to a slap on the face or a pregnancy out of wedlock. The second conclusion is known as pikot or what Western cultures would call a 'shotgun marriage'. This proverb is also applied in terms of diplomacy and negotiation.)

== See also ==
- Filipino language
  - Filipino alphabet
  - Filipino orthography
  - Komisyon sa Wikang Filipino
- Abakada alphabet
- Old Tagalog
- Taglish
- Tagalog Wikipedia
- Languages of the Philippines
