= Batangas Tagalog =

Dialect of Tagalog

- Batangueño Tagalog ᜊᜆᜅ᜔ᜄᜐ᜔ ᜆᜎᜄᜓᜎ᜔
- Native to: Philippines
- Region: Batangas
- Language family: Austronesian: Malayo-Polynesian; Philippine?; Greater Central Philippine; Central Philippine; Kasiguranin–Tagalog; Tagalog; Batangas Tagalog
- Writing system: Latin (Abakada alphabet; Historically Baybayin

Language codes
- ISO 639-3: –
- Glottolog: bata1300
- Places where Batangas Tagalog is generally spoken

Batangas Tagalog (also known as Batangan or Batangueño Tagalog; Baybayin: ᜊᜆᜅ᜔ᜄᜐ᜔ ᜆᜎᜄᜓᜎ᜔) is a regional variety of Tagalog spoken primarily in the province of Batangas and adjoining areas of Cavite, Laguna, Quezon, and Mindoro in the Philippines. It is characterized by a strong accent and a vocabulary and grammar closely related to Old Tagalog.

== Grammar ==
The most obvious difference is the use of the passive imperfect in place of the present progressive tense. In common Tagalog, this is done by inserting the infix -um- after the first syllable and repeating the first syllable. In the Batangan Tagalog dialect, this form is created by adding the prefix na- to the word.

This conjugation also serves as the passive past for commonly spoken Tagalog. The answer to "Nasaan si Pedro?" (Where is Pedro?) is "Nakain ng isda!" (He's eating a fish!). To those unfamiliar with this usage, the statement might mean "He was eaten by a fish!"; however, a Batangas Tagalog user can distinguish between the two apparently-identical forms by determining the stress in the words (nákain is eating and nakáin is eaten).

Batangas Tagalog continues to maintains distinct demonstratives and locative adverbs referring to objects or locations near to speaker but not to addressee, such as irí or arí (this) and rini or dini (here). This distinction has been lost in most other Tagalog dialects (including the standard) where those used with objects or locations near to both speaker and addressee (i.e. itó and dito) are used in both cases.

== Morphology ==
Another difference between Batangan Tagalog and commonly spoken Tagalog is the use of the verb ending -i instead of -an mo, especially in the imperative. This only occurs when the verb stands alone in a sentence or is the last word in the phrase. When another word follows, Batangueños would not use the -an form.

Example 1

- Person A: Mayroon pong nakatok sa pintô (Someone is knocking at the door.)
- Person B: Abá'y!, bukse! (Then open it!)

However,

- Person A: Mayroon pong kumakatok sa pintô (Someone is knocking at the door.)
- Person B: Abá'y, buksán mo! (Then you go open it!)

This uses the absolute degree of an adjective, not heard elsewhere. It is the rough equivalent to -issimo or -issima in Italian, and is missing from other Tagalog dialects. This is done with the prefix pagka-:

Example 1

- Pagkaganda palá ng anák ng mag-asawang aré, ah! (Pagkaganda palá ng anák ng mag-asawang iré, ah! The child of this couple is indeed beautiful!)

Example 2

- Pagkatagal mo ga. (You took so long.)

== Plural pronouns ==
=== Second-person plural ===
Another notable characteristic of the Batangan dialect is the dual-number pronouns, referring to two things (as opposed to plural, which can be two or more). Although it has not disappeared in some other areas, this form is not used in standard Tagalog.

Example 1

- Batangan Tagalog: Ta'na! (Let's go!)
- Common Tagalog: Tayo na! (Let's go! Literally, "Let us...")

Example 2

- Batangan Tagalog: Buksé mo nga iyáng telebisyón nata. (Please turn our television on.)
- Common Tagalog: Buksán mo nga ang TV natin.

Intonation tends to rise, particularly in the expression of deep emotion.

=== Majestic plural ===
The plural is not limited to those of lower ranks; those in authority are also expected to use this pluralization with the first-person plural inclusive Tayo, which acts as the majestic plural. The Batangueños use the inclusive pronoun, commonly for government officials or those with authority over a territory (such as a priest or bishop).

This form is used by doctors or nurses when talking to patients. A doctor from the province will rarely ask someone how he is feeling; rather, he will ask "How are we feeling?".

Although pô and opò show respect, Batangueños replace these with hô and ohò (a typical Batangueño morphophonemic change). However, Batangueños understand the use of pô and opò (the more-common variant in other Tagalog-speaking regions).

== Phonology ==
Another notable difference is the closed syllable connected by glottal stop, which is not used in standard Tagalog, probably influenced by Spanish, where glottal stops don't exist. The City of Tanauan is pronounced tan-'a-wan, although it would be pronounced ta-'na-wan by other Tagalog speakers. This is also true of words such as matamis (pronounced matam-is). Because Batangan Tagalog is more closely related to ancient Tagalog, the merger of the phonemes e and i and the phonemes o and u are prevalent; e and o are allophones of i and u, respectively, in Tagalog.

Prevalent in Batangan but missing from other dialects are the sounds ey and ow. Unlike their English counterparts, these diphthongs are sounded primarily on the first vowel and only rapidly on the second; this is similar to the e in the Spanish word educación and the first o in the Italian word Antonio.

== Vocabulary ==
Vocabulary is also divergent. Batangas Tagalog has several translations of the word "fall", depending on how a person falls. They may have nagdagasâ (slipped), nagtingkuró (lost their balance) or nagsungabâ (fallen on their face.)

To the confusion of other Tagalog speakers, Batangueños use the phrase Hindî pô akó nagyayabang! to mean "I am not telling a lie!"; common Tagalog speakers would say Hindî pô akó nagsisinungaling! To them, the former statement means "I am not bragging (or boasting)!"

A panday is a handyman in Batangas and a smith in Manila. An apáw is "mute" ("overflow" in common Tagalog [ápaw]; "mute" is pipi). An exclamation of disbelief is anlaah!, roughly a shorter translation of walâ iyán ("that's nothing" or "false") in common Tagalog.

The Batangas dialect is also known for the particle eh. While it is used throughout the province, some variations exist (such as ala eh). This particle has no intrinsic meaning; its closest equivalent in English is in the conversational context of "Well,...". In other cases, it can show that the preceding word is the cause of something, much as kasi would be used. The particle eh is also spoken in other native Tagalog-speaking areas and by second-language speakers w/ the same closest English translation mentioned above w/out its variants like ala eh.

Batangas dialect is known for the term laang, translated as "only" or "just", their version of lang in Manila and their own shortened version of lámang.

=== Other terms ===
Batangas Tagalog	Common Tagalog	Meaning	Example usage
asbág	yabang	egoism	Ika'y 'wag aasbag-asbag dine sa pamamahay ko.
bilót	tutà	puppy	
huntahan	kuwentuhan	storytelling	Ta' muna sa amin at doon tayo maghuntahan.
kaunin	sunduín	to fetch	Ako laang ay aalis muna at may kakaunin ako sa paaralan.
bang-áw	ulól	stupid	
buol	tulog	sleep	
sumbî	suntók	punch	
taluti	daldál	talkativeness	
guyam	langgám	ant	
tarangkahan	geyt	gate	
kahanggán	kapitbahay	neighbor	
atungal	iyák	cry	
mabaak	mahatì	to sever	Lumindol sa amin at kita na nabaak ng bahay.
dagasâ	bulusok	sudden fall of	Nahulog sa hagdan aba'y dagasa na eh.
dini	dito	here (near to speaker)	
barino	galít	angry	
sura	inís	annoyed	
gahaman	takaw	gluttony	Magtira ka naman, ang gahaman mo sa pagkain eh.
susót	yamót	exasperated	Ayaw ko na sa bahay nakakasusot mga kapatid ko.
harót	landî	flirting	Ika'y bata palang ay napakaharot na agad.
litár (Note: [ɾ], written as "r", in syllable-final position in native Tagalog words was influenced by Spanish.)	pasyál	to stroll	
gurà	sombrero	hat	
landáng	lagnát	fever	
kapulong	kausap	talking	
bumarik	maglasing	to drink alcohol	Ta' muna sa amen at tayo'y bumarik ng saglit.
sumuray	lumikô	to swerve	Lasing ata eh at susuray-suray ng lakad.
tubal	marumíng damít	soiled clothing	Maglaba ka naman ng iyong tubal at inaamag na.
timò	tigil	stop; staying in one place	
takín	tahól	bark (of a dog)	
mamay	lolo	grandfather	Ika'y magmano muna sa mamay bago umalis.
hiso	sepilyo	to swerve	
asbár (Note: [ɾ], written as "r", in syllable-final position in native Tagalog words was influenced by Spanish.)	talì	lace	
magpabulak	magpakulô	to boil	
masukal	malagô	grown-over	Iyong lupa namin doon sa bundok ang sukal na ng mga damo.
mag-imis	maglinis	to clean	Ang dumi ng lamesa ika'y mag-imis muna.
umis	ngiti	smile; grin	
umungkót	umupô	to sit	
pangkál	tamád, batugan	lazy	Wala niya, wala kapang nagagawa napakapangkal mo naman.
maas, ulagâ, malág	tangá, ulól	fool; foolish	
hawot	tuyô	dried fish	Itlog at hawot ang ulam namin noong umaga.
bangì	ihaw	grilling	
balatong	munggó	mung bean	Tuwing Biyernes ay balatong ang ulam namin.
salop	salok	ganta (unit)	Pabili nga ho ako ng isang salop ng bigas.
sakól	pagkakamay, pagkáin gamit ang kamáy	eating by hand	
patikad	dali-dalì	hurried	Madami ka pa atang pupuntahan eh patikad ka na maglakad.
sampigâ	sampál	slap	Huwag kang papakita talaga sa akin at sampiga ang abot mo.
mihâ-mihâ	malamyâ	prudish	
palanyág	pasikat, hambóg	boastful	
dag-im (standard dagim)	maitím na kaulapan	rain cloud	Tingni, ang langit ay dagim, mukhang uulan.
asbók	singáw, apáw, usok	sudden gust of smoke	Asbok na ang iyong sinasaing na kanin.

== Geographic distribution ==
Apart from the province proper of Batangas, Batangan Tagalog is spoken in surrounding areas of Calabarzon and Mimaropa regions.

=== Batangas Tagalog dialect surrounding within area ===
Outside Batangas borders

- Alaminos, Laguna
- Alfonso, Cavite
- Amadeo, Cavite
- Calamba, Laguna
- Candelaria, Quezon
- Los Baños, Laguna
- Magallanes, Cavite
- San Antonio, Quezon
- San Pablo, Laguna
- Calauan, Laguna
- Tagaytay, Cavite
- Ternate, Cavite
- Tiaong, Quezon
- Dolores, Quezon
- Cavite City, Cavite
- Bailen, Cavite
- Maragondon, Cavite
- Rest of Cavite (except Bacoor)
- Southern parts of Laguna
- Rest of Oriental Mindoro (except Bulalacao)
- Rest of Occidental Mindoro
- Scattered parts of Metro Manila, Palawan and Mindanao especially in urban areas where Batangueños and their descendants had settled, to varying degrees within these areas.
