= Cecilio =

Cecilio is a given name. Notable people with the name include:

- Cecilio Apostol (1877–1938), Filipino poet
- Cecilio Báez (1862–1941), provisional President of Paraguay 1905–1906
- Cecilio Guante (born 1960), professional Major League Baseball player
- Cecilio Lastra (1951–2025), Spanish professional boxer
- Ronaldo Cecilio Leiva, Guatemalan military officer, Minister of Defence from 2006 to 2008
- Cecilio Lopes (born 1979), Cape Verdean international football player
- Cecilio Pérez Bordón, Paraguayan Minister of Public Works under President Fernando Lugo
- Cecilio Plá (1860–1934), Spanish painter
- Cecilio Putong, Filipino educator, writer, Boy Scout leader, UNESCO fellow, author, pensionado and Philippine Secretary of Education
- Cecilio Romaña (1899–1997), Argentinian physician remembered for describing Romaña's sign
- José Cecilio del Valle (1780–1834), first president of United Provinces of Central America
- Cecilio Waterman (born 1991), Panamanian professional association football striker
- Cecilio Zubillaga Perera (1887–1948), Venezuelan journalist

== See also ==
- Aguada Cecilio, village and municipality in Río Negro Province in Argentina
- Cecilio & Kapono, pop music duo from Hawaii formed in 1973 by Henry Kapono Ka’aihue and Cecilio David Rodriguez
- Doctor Cecilio Báez, town in the Caaguazú department of Paraguay
- Dr. Cecilio Putong National High School, originally the Bohol National High School
- Nadie oyó gritar a Cecilio Fuentes, 1965 Argentine film
- Universidad José Cecilio del Valle, private higher education institution in Honduras
