= Philippine scripts =

Indigenous scripts in the Philippines

Baybayin, its variants, and other Philippine scripts

Indigenous Philippine scripts are various writing systems that developed and flourished in the Philippines around 300 BC. These scripts are related to other Southeast Asian writing system that developed from South Indian Brahmi scripts. These were used in Asoka Inscriptions and Pallava Grantha, a type of writing used in the writing of palm leaf books called Grantha script around the ascendancy of the Pallava dynasty about the 5th century, and Arabic scripts that have been used in Southeast Asian countries.
In the 21st century, some cultural organizations have proposed the collective name of suyat for Philippine scripts.

== Historical Philippine Indic scripts ==
=== Kawi ===
The Kawi script originated in Java and was used across much of Maritime Southeast Asia. It is hypothesized to be an ancestor of Baybayin.

The presence of Kawi script in the Philippines is evidenced in the Laguna Copperplate Inscription, the earliest known written document found in the Philippines. It is a legal document with the inscribed date of Shaka era 822, corresponding to April 21, 900 CE. It was written in the Kawi script in a variety of Old Malay containing numerous loanwords from Sanskrit and a few non-Malay vocabulary elements whose origin is ambiguous between Kawi and Old Tagalog. A second example of Kawi script can be seen on the Butuan Ivory Seal, found in the 1970s and dated between the 9th and 12th centuries. It is an ancient seal made of ivory that was found in an archaeological site in Butuan. The seal is inscribed with the word Butwan in stylized Kawi. Declared as a National Cultural Treasure, the Butuan Ivory Seal is now housed at the National Museum of the Philippines.

=== Baybayin ===
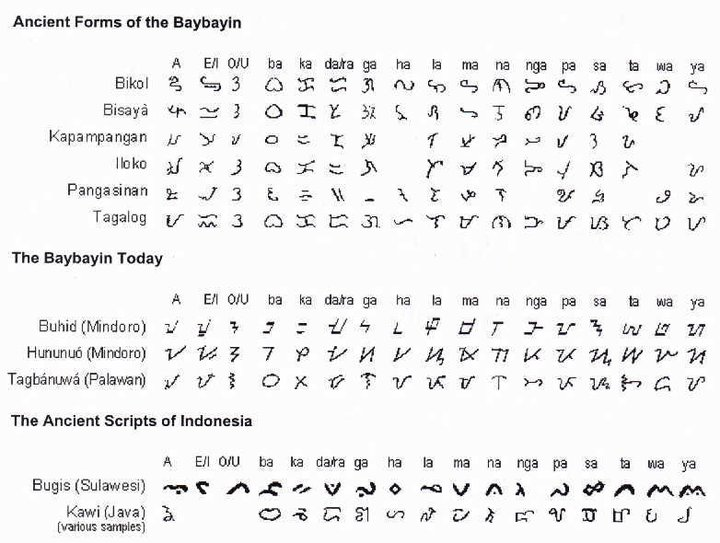
Different variants (styles) of Baybayin, and abugidas in other Southeast Asian countries.

Baybayin is a script that has historically been widely used in traditional Tagalog domains and in other parts of Luzon and Visayas in the Philippines prior to and during the 16th and 17th centuries. Baybayin is an abugida which uses diacritics to associate vowels with consonant symbols. The name Baybayin is Tagalog in origin and is used as an umbrella term that encompasses other Philippine variants known under other names in a number of other major Philippine ethnolinguistic domains, such as Badlit (in the Visayas), Kur-itan (in the Ilocandia), Basahan (in the Bicolandia), and Kulitan (in Pampanga). Baybayin script continued to be used during the early part of the Spanish colonization of the Philippines until largely being replaced by usage of the Latin alphabet.

An earthenware burial jar found in Batangas, called the "Calatagan Pot," is inscribed with characters strikingly similar to Baybayin, and is claimed to have been inscribed ca. 1300 AD. However, its authenticity has not yet been proven. The University of Santo Tomas Archives in Manila, one of the largest archives in the Philippines, currently possesses the most extant collections of ancient variants of Baybayin script in the world.

The use of the Baybayin was widespread during the 15th century. By the end of 17th century, its use was almost non-existent and its use in public life eventually disappeared by the 18th century. The inability of the script to record the new sounds introduced by the Spaniards, the rapid acquisition of literacy in the Latin script with its concomitant social and material benefits, and the disruption of traditional family activities were the main culprits for the loss of Baybayin script. Buhid, Hanunóo, and Tagbanwa are the only surviving descendants of Baybayin, however their use is confined to poetry and other literary pursuits among their writers.

== Arabic ==
The Arabic alphabet (Arabic: أَلْأَبْجَدِيَّة ٱلْعَرَبِيَّة, al-ʾabjadīyaḧ l-ʿarabīyah or أَلْحُرُوف ٱلْعَرَبِيَّة, al-ḥurūf l-ʿarabīyaḧ), or Arabic abjad, is the Arabic script as it is codified for writing Arabic. It is written from right to left in a cursive style and includes 28 letters. Most letters have contextual letterforms.

The word for the Arabic language (العربية, al-`Arabiyya).

Unlike Baybayin (which is an abugida) and Eskayan (which is a syllabary), the Arabic script is considered an abjad, meaning it only uses consonants. Specifically, it is considered an "impure abjad". As with other impure abjads, such as the Hebrew alphabet, scribes devised means of indicating vowel sounds by separate vowel diacritics later on in the development of the script.

=== Jawi ===
Jawi script (Jawi: جاوي) is an Arabic script for writing Tausūg, Malay, Acehnese, Banjarese, Minangkabau, and several other languages in Southeast Asia.

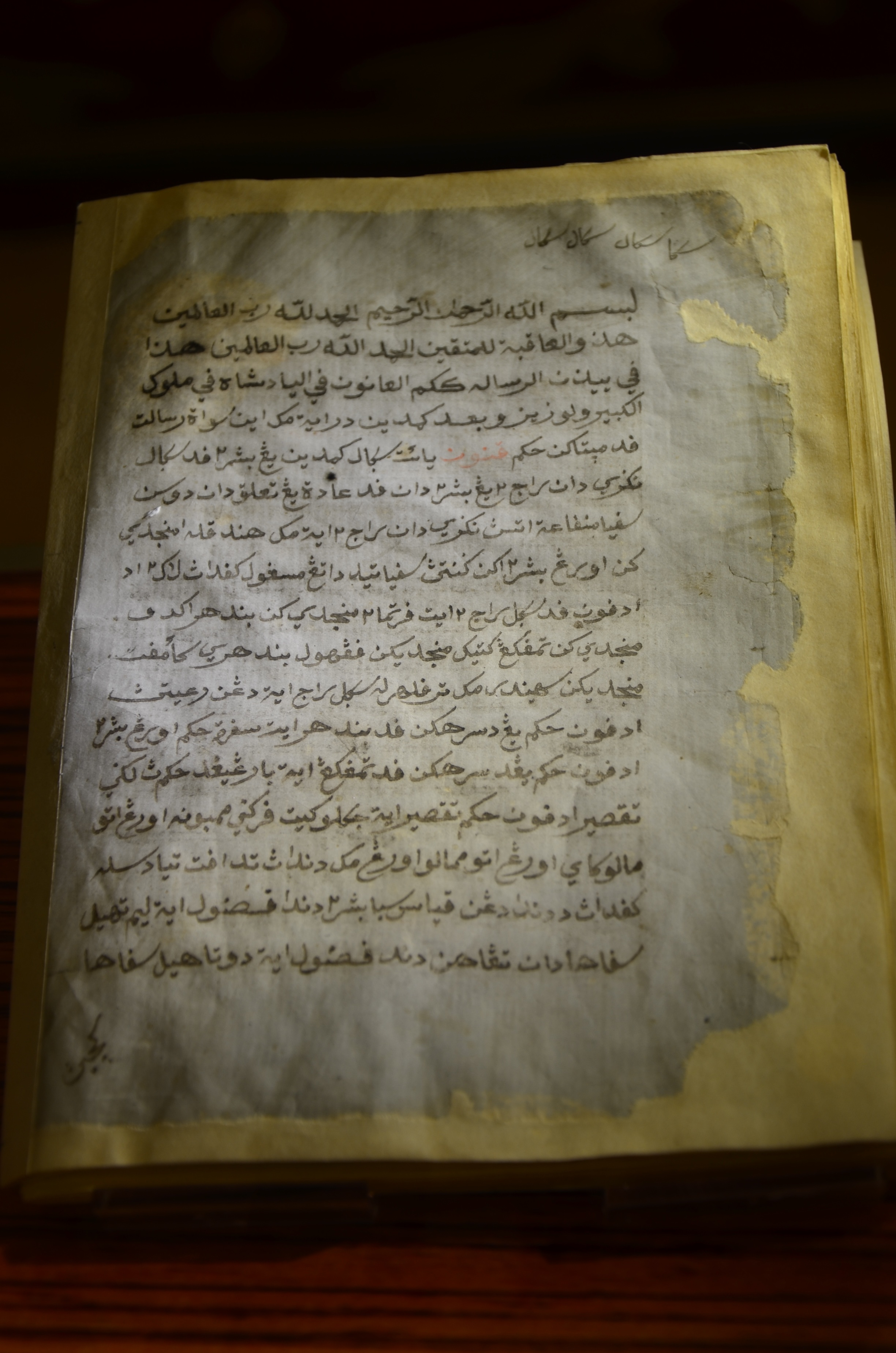
A copy of Undang-Undang Melaka ('Laws of Malacca').

The script became prominent with the spread of Islam, supplanting the earlier writing systems. The Tausugs, Malays, and other groups that use it hold the script in high esteem as a gateway to understanding Islam and its Holy Book, the Quran. The use of Jawi script was a key factor driving the emergence of Malay as the lingua franca of the region, alongside the spread of Islam. It was widely used in Sultanate of Malacca, Sultanate of Johor, Sultanate of Brunei, Sultanate of Sulu, Sultanate of Maguindanao, Sultanate of Pattani, the Sultanate of Aceh to the Sultanate of Ternate in the east as early as the 15th century.

== Contemporary Philippine scripts ==
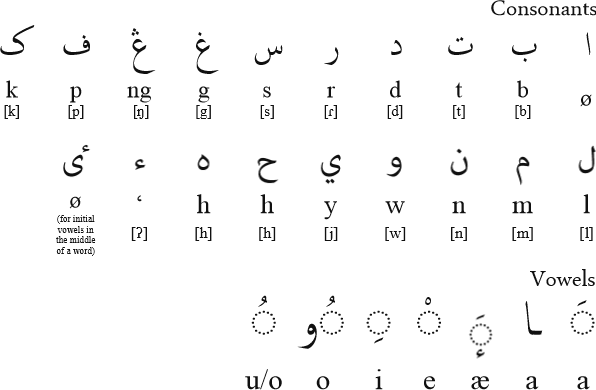
Kirim script

Contemporary Philippine scripts include the modern Kulitan of the Kapampangan people, variants of reformed Baybayin, the Iniskaya script of the Eskaya people, the Jawi script, and the Kirim script. While suyat is sometimes used as an umbrella term for these indigenous scripts, this terminology is non-standard and still considered a proposal among script advocates.

=== Contemporary Philippine Indic scripts ===
In 1999, four Philippine scripts were inscribed in the UNESCO Memory of the World International Register, under the name Philippine Paleographs (Hanunoo, Buid, Tagbanua and Pala’wan). The four scripts, Hanunó'o/Hanunoo, Buhid/Buid, Tagbanwa, and Ibalnan scripts, were recognized by UNESCO as the only existing suyat scripts. UNESCO also recognized. The ambahan poetry made with the Hanunó'o/Hanunoo script was also cited. The inscription of the four suyat scripts was the first documentary heritage of the Philippines to be inscribed in the Memory of the World Programme. Computer fonts for these three living scripts are available for IBM and Macintosh platforms, and come into two styles based on actual historical and stylistic samples. PostScript and TrueType fonts as well a concise manual that gives a background of these ancient scripts and a short tutorial on how to write with them are included in each package.

Modern Indic scripts
Script	Region	Sample
Ibalnan Baybayin	Palawan	
Hanunó'o script	Mindoro	
Buhid script	Mindoro	
Tagbanwa script	Central and Northern Palawan	

=== Eskayan ===
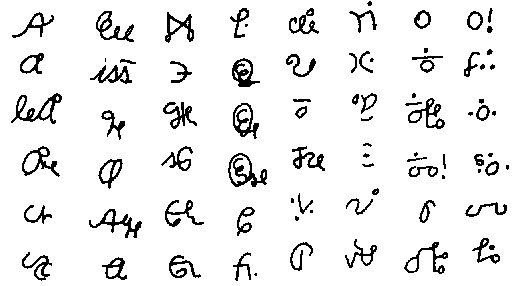
The Eskayan script

The Eskayan script is the constructed script of the auxiliary Eskayan language of the island of Bohol in the Philippines. Like Yugtun and Fox script, it is based on cursive Latin. The script was developed approximately 1920–1937. "Although the script is used for representing Visayan (Cebuano)—a widely used language of the southern Philippines—its privileged role is in the written reproduction of a constructed utopian language, referred to as Eskayan or Bisayan Declarado...the Eskayan language and its script are used by approximately 550 people for restricted purposes in the southeast of the island of Bohol."

=== Jawi ===
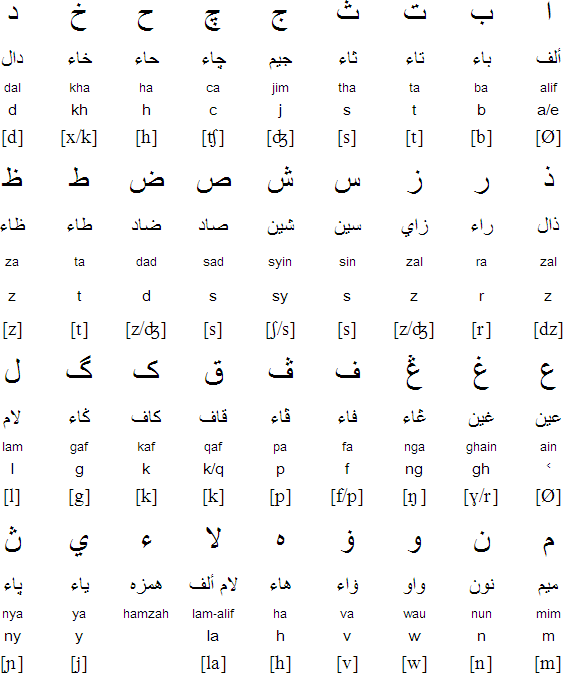
The Jawi script

The Tausūg language was previously written with the Arabic alphabet, inspired by the use of Jawi in writing the Malay language. The script used to write Tausūg differs in some aspects from Standard Arabic and Jawi, such as the way word-initial vowels are written. In Arabic, /in/ is (إن) and in Jawi it is (ان), but in Tausūg, it is (ئِن). The Tausūg Arabic script utilises the letter yā' with a hamza (ئ) to represent a short vowel. If a kasra (ئِ) is added, it becomes an 'i' sound; a fatha (ئَ) makes it is an 'a' sound, while a damma (ئُ) makes it a 'u' sound.

An example of the Arabic alphabet for written Tausūg:

- Latin script – Wayruun tuhan malaingkan Allāh, hi Muhammad ing rasūl sin Allāh
- Arabic script – وَيْـرُٷنْ تُـهَـنْ مَـلَـيِـڠْـكَـن هَالله، هِـمُـحَـمَّـدْ ئِـڠ رَسُـولْ سِـڠ الله
- English translation – There is no god but Allah, Muhammad is the Messenger of Allah

Tausug Alphabet – Arabic Script
Character	Isolated	Initial	Medial	Final	Name
ا	ﺍ			ﺎ	alip
ب	ﺏ	ﺑ	ـﺒ	ـﺐ	bā'
ت	ﺕ	ﺗ	ـﺘ	ـﺖ	tā'
ج	ﺝ	ﺟ	ـﺠ	ـﺞ	jīm
د	د			ـد	dāl
ر	ﺭ			ـر	rā'
س	ﺱ	ﺳ	ـﺴ	ـﺲ	sīn
غ	ﻍ	ﻏ	ـﻐـ	ـﻎ	gayn
ڠ	ڠ	ڠـ	ـڠـ	ـڠ	ngā'
ف	ﻑ	ﻓ	ـﻔ	ـﻒ	pā'
ک	ک	ﻛ	ـﻜ	ـک	kāp
گ	گ	ﮔ	ـﮕـ	ـﮓ	gāp
ل	ﻝ	ﻟ	ـﻠ	ـﻞ	lām
م	ﻡ	ﻣ	ـﻤ	ـﻢ	mīm
ن	ﻥ	ﻧ	ـﻨ	ﻦ	nūn
و	ﻭ			ـو	wāw
ه	ﻩ	ﻫ	ـﻬ	ﻪ	hā'
ي	ﻱ	ﻳ	ـﻴـ	ﻲ	yā'
ء	ء			ء	hamja
أ	أ			ـأ	alip with hamja above
ﺅ	ﺅ			ـﺆ	wāw with hamja above
ئ	ئ	ئـ	ــئـ	ـئ	yā' with hamja above
لا	لا	لا	ــلا	ــلا	lām alip

== National writing system ==
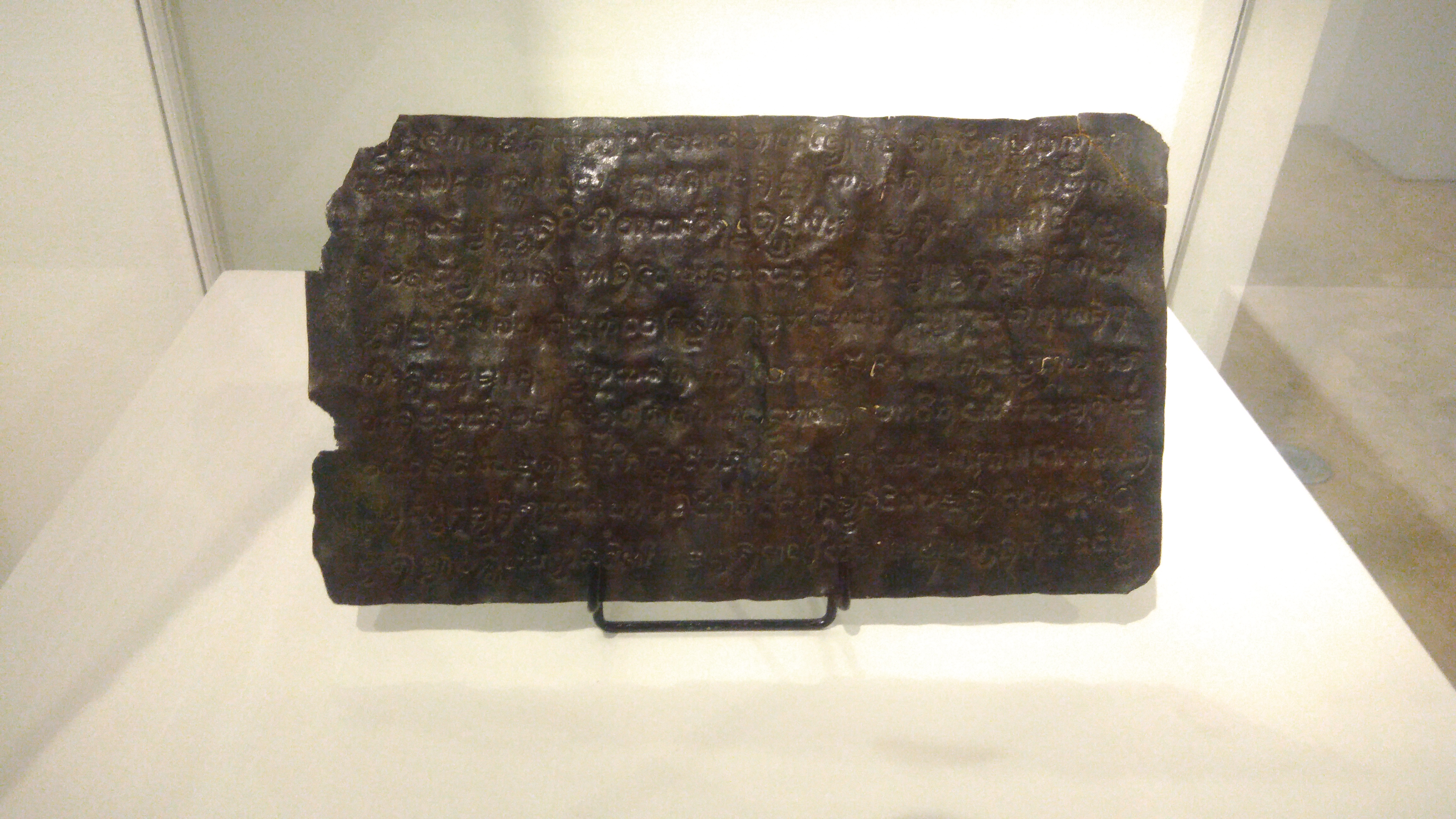
The actual image of the Laguna Copperplate Inscription found in Lumbang River, the oldest known artifact to have a suyat writing on it.

The "National Script Act" went before the House of Representatives of the Republic of the Philippines in 2011. The bill calls for the protection and conservation of Baybayin as the national script of the Philippines. Among its strategies, it aims to promote the Baybayin script by having it inscribed on all Philippine-produced or processed food products.

Due to lack of congressional and senatorial sessions and support, the bill did not pass into law in the 16th Congress. It was refiled in 2016 under the 17th Congress, with little political support.

The Act came before the House again in 2018. According to a press release from the House, the bill "declares there is a need to promote, protect, preserve and conserve "Baybayin" as the National Writing System of the Philippines, using it as a tool for cultural and economic development to create a consciousness, respect and pride for the legacies of Filipino cultural history, heritage and the country's authentic identity."

== Calligraphy ==
The diversity of Philippine scripts has also established various calligraphy techniques and styles in the Philippines. Each Philippine script has its own calligraphy, although all of them are collectively referred to as Filipino calligraphy.

Kulitan calligraphy

Baybayin calligraphy

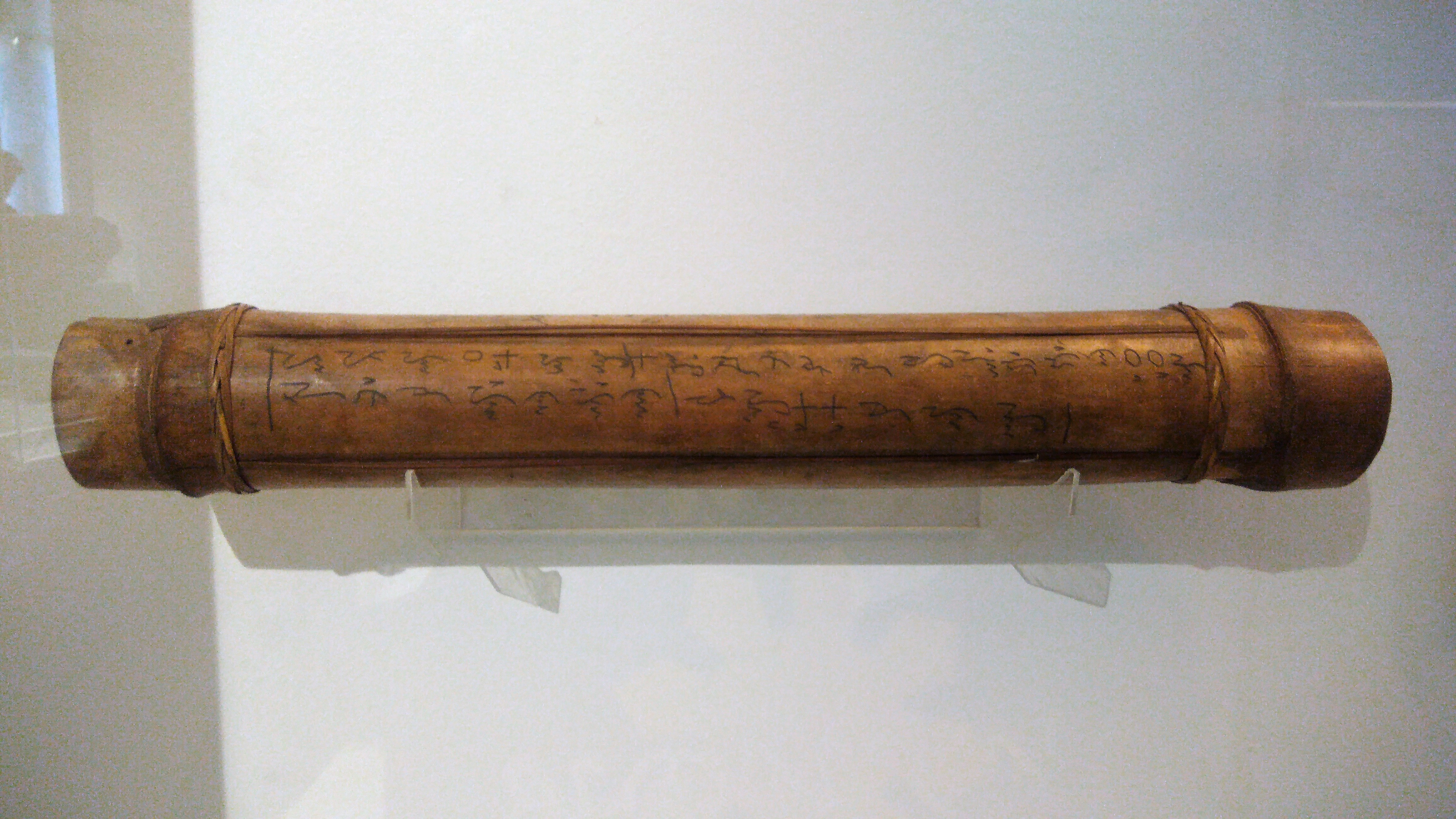
Tagbanwa musical instrument (tube zither) with Tagbanwa calligraphy

Buhid calligraphy

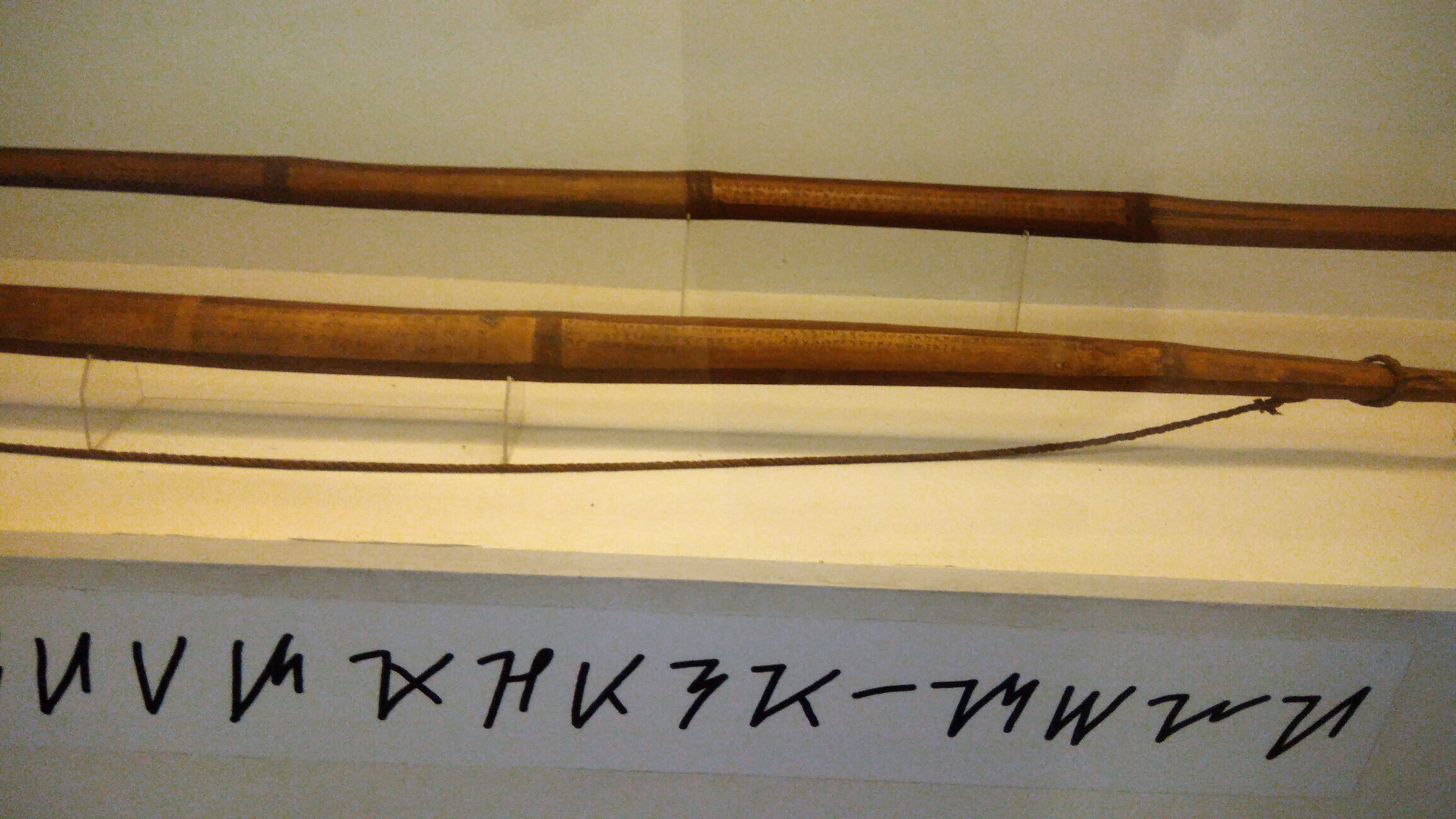
Bow with Hanunó'o calligraphy

== See also ==
- Brahmi script
- Kawi script
- Dambana
- Culture of the Philippines
- Art of the Philippines
- Hinduism in the Philippines
- Indosphere
- Greater India
- Calligraphy
- List of writing systems of Indonesia
- List of India-related topics in the Philippines
- List of Memory of the World Documentary Heritage in the Philippines
