= List of Cultural Properties of the Philippines in Tagbilaran =

The list of Cultural Properties of the Philippines in Naujan, Oriental Mindoro contains relevant cultural buildings in the Philippine municipality of Tagbilaran.

Cultural Property wmph identifier (Note: wmph is an internal identifier used by Wikimedia Philippines to identify the monument. This is not an official identifier, and only shown temporarily in the templates until the government creates an updated complete list.)	Site name	Description	Province	City or municipality	Address	Coordinates	Image
	St. Joseph the Worker Cathedral (a.k.a. Tagbilaran Cathedral)		Bohol	Tagbilaran			Upload file
	Bohol Museum		Bohol	Tagbilaran			Upload file
	Bohol Provincial Capitol		Bohol	Tagbilaran			Upload file
	Dr. Cecilio Putong National High School	Gabaldon building, established in 1905	Bohol	Tagbilaran	CPG Avenue, Poblacion II		Upload Photo
	Rocha- Suarez Ancestral House	built around 1840	Bohol	Tagbilaran			Upload Photo
	Rocha Ancestral House	built in 1831 as inscribed in the kitchen wing of the house	Bohol	Tagbilaran			Upload Photo
	Hontanosas Ancestral House		Bohol	Tagbilaran			Upload Photo
	Beldia Ancestral House	built in 1858	Bohol	Tagbilaran			Upload Photo
	Yap Ancestral House	built in early to mid-19th century	Bohol	Tagbilaran			Upload Photo
	Butalid Ancestral House	built in 1820, demolished in 2002	Bohol	Tagbilaran			Upload Photo
	Jalap Ancestral House	built around 1920	Bohol	Tagbilaran			Upload Photo
	Reyes Ancestral House (a.k.a. Tandoc House)	built in the late 19th century	Bohol	Tagbilaran			Upload Photo
	Fuentes Ancestral House	built in 1925	Bohol	Tagbilaran			Upload Photo
	Leano Ancestral House	built around 1920	Bohol	Tagbilaran			Upload Photo
	Torralba Ancestral House	built in the late 1930s	Bohol	Tagbilaran			Upload Photo
	Armachuelo Ancestral House	built in 1916	Bohol	Tagbilaran	Marapao St. cor. Rocha St.		Upload Photo
	Camacho Ancestral House	built in the 1930s	Bohol	Tagbilaran			Upload Photo
	Escalera Ancestral House	built in 1935 (based on inscription on air vent gable)	Bohol	Tagbilaran			Upload Photo
	Carlos P. Garcia Ancestral House	built in 1956	Bohol	Tagbilaran	Hontanosas St.		Upload Photo
	Ogan Mansion	built in the 1930s	Bohol	Tagbilaran	Rocha St. cor. Hontanosas St.		Upload Photo
	Sarabia Ancestral House	built around 1930s (based on inscription in foundation)	Bohol	Tagbilaran			Upload Photo
	Unknown House	built around 1950	Bohol	Tagbilaran	Jacinto St.		Upload Photo
	De la Serna Ancestral House	built around 1920	Bohol	Tagbilaran	Torralba St.		Upload Photo
	Caseñas Mansion	built in 1937	Bohol	Tagbilaran			Upload file
	Yap House	built in 1930	Bohol	Tagbilaran			Upload Photo
	Lim Ancestral House	built in 1930	Bohol	Tagbilaran			Upload Photo
	Ruiz Ancestral House		Bohol	Tagbilaran			Upload Photo
	Maceren Ancestral House	built in the 1920s	Bohol	Tagbilaran	Garcia Ave. cor. Borja St.		Upload Photo
	Lumayag Ancestral House		Bohol	Tagbilaran			Upload Photo
	Balili Ancestral House	built around 1934	Bohol	Tagbilaran			Upload Photo
	Cabalit Ancestral House	built in 1920 (based on inscription), partially demolished in 1996	Bohol	Tagbilaran			Upload Photo
	Cabalit Ancestral House	built in 1931	Bohol	Tagbilaran			Upload Photo
	Jumamil Mansion	built in 1926	Bohol	Tagbilaran			Upload Photo
	Matuod Mansion	built on July 14, 1928 (based on inscription on a post), demolished in 2003	Bohol	Tagbilaran			Upload Photo
	Sapong House		Bohol	Tagbilaran			Upload Photo
	Paunat Ancestral House	built on June 24, 1936 (based on inscription on the staircase)	Bohol	Tagbilaran			Upload Photo
	Ramirez Ancestral House (a.k.a.Villa Alzhun)		Bohol	Tagbilaran			Upload Photo
	Quibir Ancestral House	built before World War II	Bohol	Tagbilaran			Upload Photo
	Unknown Ancestral House	demolished in 2010	Bohol	Tagbilaran			Upload Photo
