= Eskaya people =

Cultural minority found in Bohol, Philippines,

Eskaya
Total population
- 2,285

Regions with significant populations
- Philippines: Bohol

Languages
- Cebuano (Boholano dialect); auxiliary use of Eskayan

Religion
- Philippine Independent Church

Related ethnic groups
- Boholano, Cebuano

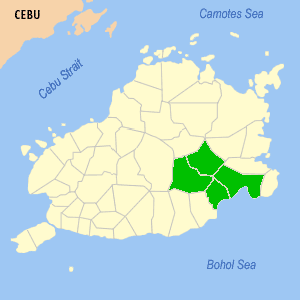
locator map of Eskaya in Bohol

The Eskaya, less commonly known as the Visayan-Eskaya, is the collective name for the members of a cultural minority found in Bohol, Philippines, which is distinguished by its cultural heritage, particularly its literature, language, dress and religious observances. After the Eskaya first came to public attention in 1980, these cultural practices were the subject of intense speculation on the part of local journalists and amateur historians who made diverse claims about the ethnolinguistic status of the Eskaya people. The unique Eskayan language and writing system in particular has been a source of fascination and controversy. Some journalists argued that the Eskaya were historically displaced from the Middle East, while others suggested that the community was a cult speaking an invented language. According to Eskaya mythology, the language and script was created through divine inspiration by the ancestor Pinay who based it on the human body. Suppressed by the Spanish colonists, Pinay's language was said to have resurfaced under the leadership of Mariano Datahan (ca. 1875-January 17, 1949), a veteran of Bohol's republican army. Although the historical existence of Pinay cannot be confirmed, more recent studies that combined linguistic analysis with oral history and genealogical research provide evidence that the Eskaya language was most likely created and disseminated within a generation by a charismatic individual. Today, the Eskaya are officially classified as an Indigenous Cultural Community under The Indigenous Peoples' Rights Act of 1997 (Republic Act No. 8371). A number of reports have suggested that Eskaya linguistic and cultural education has been in steady decline since the mid-1980s, although promising revitalisation efforts have also been documented.

== Area ==
Most members of the Eskaya community inhabit a mountainous area that intersects the municipalities of Duero, Guindulman, Pilar and Sierra Bullones in the once-forested region of Bohol's southeast interior. The original Eskaya settlement in Biabas (Guindulman), was established in 1902. In 1951, the second township of Taytay (municipality of Duero) was founded by Fabian Baja in accordance with Datahan's directions. Significant Eskaya populations are now also found in the nearby townships of Canta-ub, Lundag, Tambongan, Cadapdapan, and Fatimah. In 1996, the Eskaya community was awarded a certificate of Ancestral Domain Claim by President Fidel Ramos. An official census of the Eskaya population has not yet been made. One report estimates that in 1991 there were 130 Eskaya families living in Bohol.

== Language and script ==
The Eskayas speak a Boholano dialect of Cebuano in daily life. Boholano Cebuano is the dominantly used language among the languages spoken by the members of the Eskayan tribe. This variety is used in their close familial interactions, in their conversations with their neighbors in the community, in their transactions in the barangay, school meetings, social gatherings, church rituals and in the trade and commerce. However, they are better known for their auxiliary language, known as Eskayan, or Ineskaya, which is used for prayers, songs, and formal speeches. Lexically, Eskayan shows no clear relationship with any known language (however, considered to be an encryption of Cebuano) although there is strong but inconsistent Spanish influence. A striking feature of the language is its unusual phonotactics.

The Eskayan writing system takes the form of a syllabary of over 1,000 characters, all modeled on parts of the human body including internal organs. This unique script has been compared variously to Phoenician, Etruscan, Hebrew, and even the undeciphered script of the Butuan paleograph. While there are no mother-tongue speakers of Eskayan, it is taught to both adults and children in volunteer-run cultural schools. The Eskayan language and script has been the object of ongoing controversy.

== Religion ==
Under the direction of Mariano Datahan, the group converted en masse to the nascent Philippine Independent Church in about 1902. Community members revere the entity Suno which is conflated with the Santo Niño, and in addition to weekly church services they are served by appointed spiritual leaders known as biki and beriki. The biki, or bishop, is responsible for performing harvest ceremonies and other rituals such as house blessing. Before a house can be constructed, a ritual is performed in which a spiritual leader asks the permission of the spirits. If permission is not granted, the builder must select a new site. The Eskaya also retain spiritual traditions once widespread in lowland Boholano rural communities. (Note: For discussion of lowland Boholano customs, see Putong 1965.)

== Eskaya society ==
The teaching of Eskayan in the volunteer schools is one of the few remaining cultural practices of the Eskaya community.

Formerly, Eskaya men would wear shirts made of piña raffia with a Chinese-style collar, black breeches, and cotton berets. Women wore piña dresses with bulging sleeves similar to the Spanish-influenced Boholano style (mostly in Biabas) and covered their hair with cotton habits (mostly in Taytay). Traditionally, women were not permitted to cut their hair short nor wear trousers, and drinking and dancing were universally prohibited. For the most part these customs have been discontinued, however traditional dress is sometimes worn on Sundays and special occasions.

At weddings the parents of the bride offer the couple a glass of water and a comb. The comb is dipped in the water and run through the hair of both bride and groom. Rice is then showered on the couple, connoting plenty.

Until recently, the Eskaya practised a form of communal farming in which a portion of land was tilled for the benefit of the whole community.

== Literature and mythology ==
Eskaya literature was first dictated for transcription by Mariano Datahan whose words were recorded by personal scribes. These texts – which comprise local oral history and regional folklore – have sometimes been referred to by journalists as the karaang mga libro or "old books". The transcribed oral literature is mostly written in both Cebuano and Eskayan; one is reported to be in Spanish. The Eskaya stories are fundamental to the community's understanding of itself, particularly its origins, belief systems, and practices. One legend tells of how the group first arrived in Bohol from Sumatra. Their first leader, Dangko, had twelve children who settled near Antequera before moving east. Various other Eskayan legends recount the stories of Boholano kings and heroes; a few of these stories even make reference to actual historical figures such as Jesus Christ, Datu Sikatuna, Ferdinand Magellan, and Francisco "Dagohoy" Sendrijas. As part of their cultural education, students must transcribe five of these texts into lined textbooks at the Eskaya schools.

The Eskaya writings mentioned by researchers are as follows: Abedeja, Ang Alpabeto sa Katsila, Ang Damgo ni Hurayhaber, Ang Lingganay na Ugís, Ang mga hiyas ug Caague ni Mariano Datahan, Ang pagtulun-an sa Bisayas, Aritmetica, Askormos Meneme, Atekeses, Bisayan Declarado, Daylinda, Grinada, Kwadra, Pamatasan, Pinay, Pinulungan, Rangnan, Simplet, Suno, Tumao and Unang Tao sa Bisaya sa Bohol. Identical texts sometimes go by different names and larger texts may subsume smaller ones. Brenda Abregana, a former curator of the Bohol Museum, has mentioned a folded book of esoteric knowledge written in Spanish but its existence has not been established.

== History ==
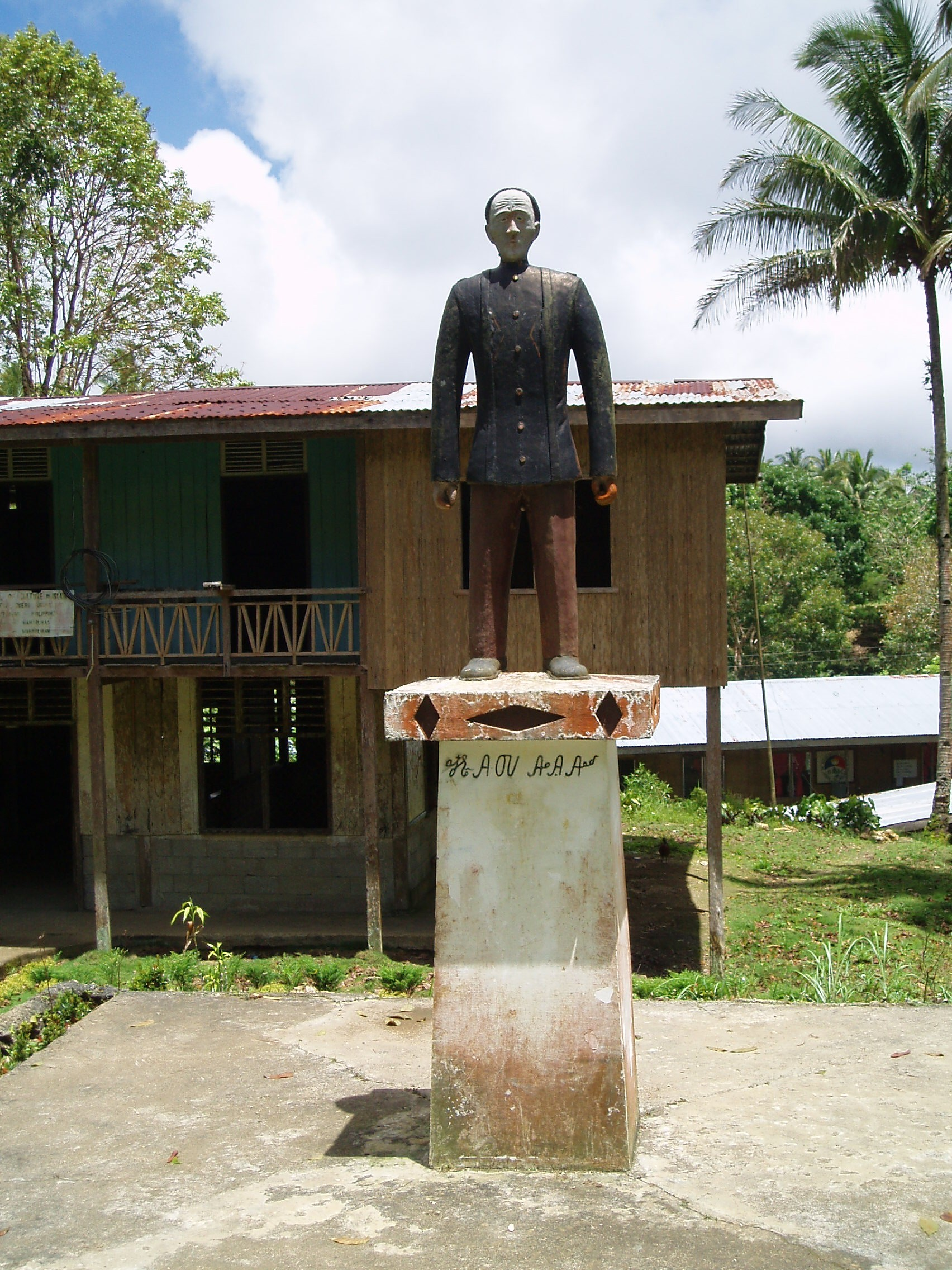
Statue of Mariano Datahan outside the Eskaya cultural school, Taytay

Although the Eskaya had been known to people living in the vicinity of Bohol's southeast highlands prior to World War II, it was only in the early 1980s that they came to wider public attention when government agricultural advisers toured the province to introduce Green Revolution policies. Local journalists and researchers have since suggested various theories on the origins of the Eskaya but there is still no broad consensus on the subject.

As far as documented evidence is concerned, genealogies attest that many of the predecessors of those living in the communities today originally came from the town of Loon on Bohol's western coast; Mariano Datahan is reported to have arrived at the site of present-day Biabas at the turn of the twentieth century; The Philippine Independent Church in Biabas was established in 1902; Datahan wrote a letter to President Manuel Quezon in 1937; and the resistance hero Col. Esteban Bernido records a meeting with Datahan in Biabas in 1944. Piers Kelly has written a history of the Eskaya community via the Eskayan language, entitled The Last Language on Earth, published by Oxford University Press in 2022.

== Theories and controversies ==
The Eskaya community has been the object of ongoing controversy, particularly with regards to its status as an indigenous group and the classification of the Eskayan language. Intense speculation in the 1980s and 1990s on the part of journalists and lay historians generated a number of theories that continue to be elaborated without resolution.

It has been argued variously that the Eskaya are a remnant of the original indigenous settlers on Bohol; that they migrated to Bohol from Sumatra in the seventh century A.D.; that they are descendants of the resistance groups that fought under Francisco Dagohoy; that they are a cult or secret society; or that they are a conscious reconstruction of an imagined pre-colonial society.

Some of the more unusual proposals are that the Eskaya people are a Semitic proto-Christian tribe; that they possess the lost book of Enoch; that they are descended from the builders of King Solomon's temple; that their existence proves the imminence of a second Messiah in Bohol; or that they guard esoteric secrets.

Likewise, the Eskayan speech variety has been associated with languages as disparate as Hebrew, Greek, and Etruscan. Recent studies have revealed that the syntax of Eskayan is virtually identical to that of Boholano Cebuano, lending weight to the theory that Eskayan is actually an auxiliary variety of this language.

== Popular culture ==
In an article written by Nickie Wang for the Manila Standard Today on 25 March 2009, Boholano actor Cesar Montano mentioned that he was interested in producing a feature film on the Eskaya. The following month, Montano announced a working title for his project, Eskaya: The Quick Brown Fox, and discussed his casting preferences which included the possibility of A-list Hollywood actors like Brad Pitt and Tom Cruise, with Manny Pacquiao in the lead role. The story concerns a wealthy, influential American who is wrongfully implicated in a crime. To prove his innocence he tracks the only witness to the crime into the forests of Bohol where he encounters the Eskaya tribe.

== Sources ==
- Abregana, B. S. (1984). "Eskaya: The Living Fossil Language in Bohol". Focus Philippines: 13–14.
- Kelly, Piers (2006). "Classification of the Eskaya language of Bohol". The Australian Journal of Anthropology. 23 (3): 357–378. doi:10.1111/taja.12005. hdl:1885/9723. Archived from the original on 2011-01-17.
- Kelly, Piers (2012a). "Your word against mine: How a rebel language and script of the Philippines was created, suppressed, recovered and contested". The Australian Journal of Anthropology. 23 (3): 357–378. doi:10.1111/taja.12005. hdl:1885/9723.
- Kelly, Piers (2012). Ponsonnet, M.; Dao, L.; Bowler, M. (eds.). The morphosyntax of a created language of the Philippines: Folk linguistic effects and the limits of relexification. The 42nd Australian Linguistic Society Conference Proceedings – 2011 (Canberra, 2-4 Dec 2011). Canberra: ANU Research Repository. pp. 180–222. hdl:1885/9401.
- Logarta, Margarita Torralba (5 September 1981). "The Eskaya Cult: Children of a Lost Language". Who: 22–27.
- Martinez, M^{a} Cristina J. (1993). Gahum Ug Gubat: A Study Of Eskayan Texts, Symbolic Subversion And Cultural Constructivity (Thesis). Unpublished manuscript.
- Manila Standard, Nickie Wang (25 March 2009). "Cesar Montano: Intertwined life in the movies and politics". Archived from the original on 17 November 2009.
- Orcullo, Proceso L. (2004). The Eskaya Communities of Taytay, Duero Bohol: A Study of Change and Continuity (PhD thesis). Davao City: Ateneo de Davao University.
- Putong, Cecilio (1965). Bohol and Its People. Manila.
- Santos, Hector (1997). "The Eskaya Script". A Philippine Leaf. Archived from the original on 27 March 2017.
- Tirol, Jes B. (1990a). "Bohol and Its System of Writing". UB Update (July–September): 4, 7.
- Tirol, Jes B. (1990b). "Butuan paleograph deciphered using the Eskaya script". UB Update (October–December): 6, 14.
- Tirol, Jes B. (1991). "Eskaya of Bohol: Traces of Hebrew Influence Paving the Way For Easy Christianization of Bohol". Bohol's Pride: 50–51, 53.
- Tubac, Angelo (2013). Lexical Retrieval in L1, L2, L3, and L4 of the Bilingual Eskayan Tribe in Taytay, Duero, Bohol (Thesis). Cebu: Unpublished. University of San Carlos.
