= Eskayan script =

Writing system

- Script type: syllabary
- Creator: Mariano Datahan; Attributed to Pinay, ancestor of the Eskaya clan
- Time period: early 1900s to present
- Direction: Left-to-right
- Languages: Eskayan

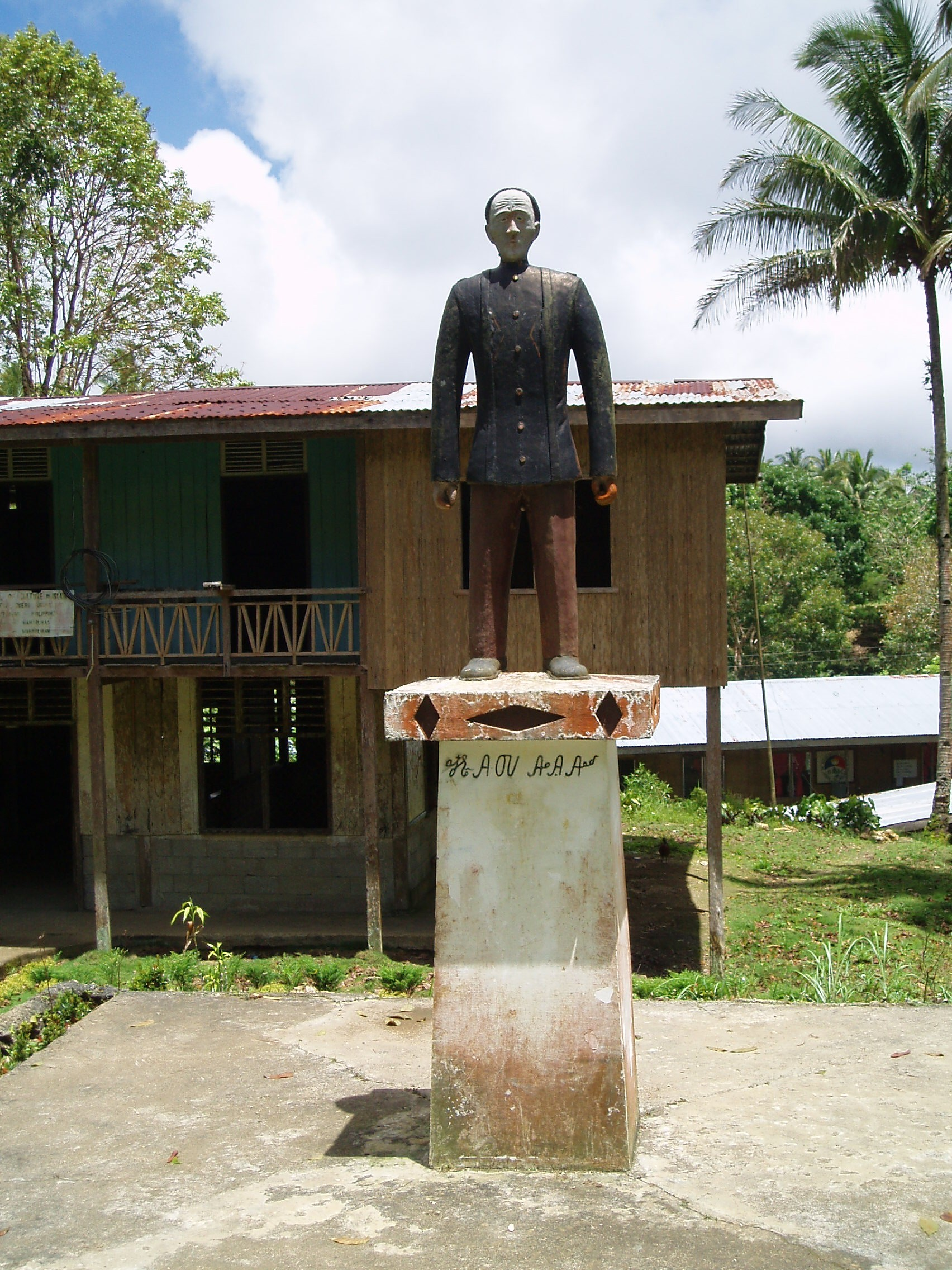
Statue of Mariano Datahan, inscribed with Eskayan script

Eskayan is the constructed script of the auxiliary Eskayan language of the island of Bohol in the Philippines. Like Yugtun and Fox script, it is based on cursive Latin. The script was developed approximately 1920–1937. "Although the script is used for representing Visayan (Cebuano)—a widely used language of the southern Philippines—its privileged role is in the written reproduction of a constructed utopian language, referred to as Eskayan or Bisayan Declarado... the Eskayan language and its script are used by approximately 550 people for restricted purposes in the southeast of the island of Bohol."

Eskayan has letters for V, CV, VC, and CCV syllables (where CCV is either CrV or ClV). For CVC, the final consonant is written with a subscript character. A basic subset of the script, the 46-character abidiha, is mixed alphabetic/syllabic; the first 25 letters are alphabetic or function as either a consonant or a syllable ending in /i/ (the Spanish name of the letter). The full syllabary, or simplit, comprises about 1,065 characters, the precise number depending on the text, with some rendering syllables which do not actually occur in the language.

== Relevant literature ==
- Sheeryn T, Bojos, Pacaña Niña Mea S, and Ramos Charmen D. 2018. "Demystifying the Magic of Eskaya Writing System in Duero, Bohol, Philippines." Asia Pacific Journal of Multidiclipinary Research 4.1:60-71.
