= Cecilio Zubillaga Perera =

Venezuelan journalist (1887–1948)

Cecilio Zubillaga Perera, better known as Chío Zubillaga, was a journalist from Venezuela. He was born in Carora (Lara state) on February 1, 1887, and died there on July 25, 1948.

== Biography ==
Although Zubillaga had little formal education and was largely self-taught, he wrote numerous articles on history and social issues for newspapers in Carora, Barquisimeto and Caracas. He was also a member of the Venezuelan National Academy of History.

=== Mentions ===
Historian Guillermo Morón published a collection of his newspaper articles and other writings under the title La Voz del Común. Writers Rafael Montes de Oca Martínez and Juan Páez Ávila discussed his life in books entitled Biografía de un Genio Popular and Chío Zubillaga, Caroreño Universal.
