= Eskayan language =

Artificial auxiliary language of the Philippines

Eskayan
- Bisaya; Iniskaya; Eskayano
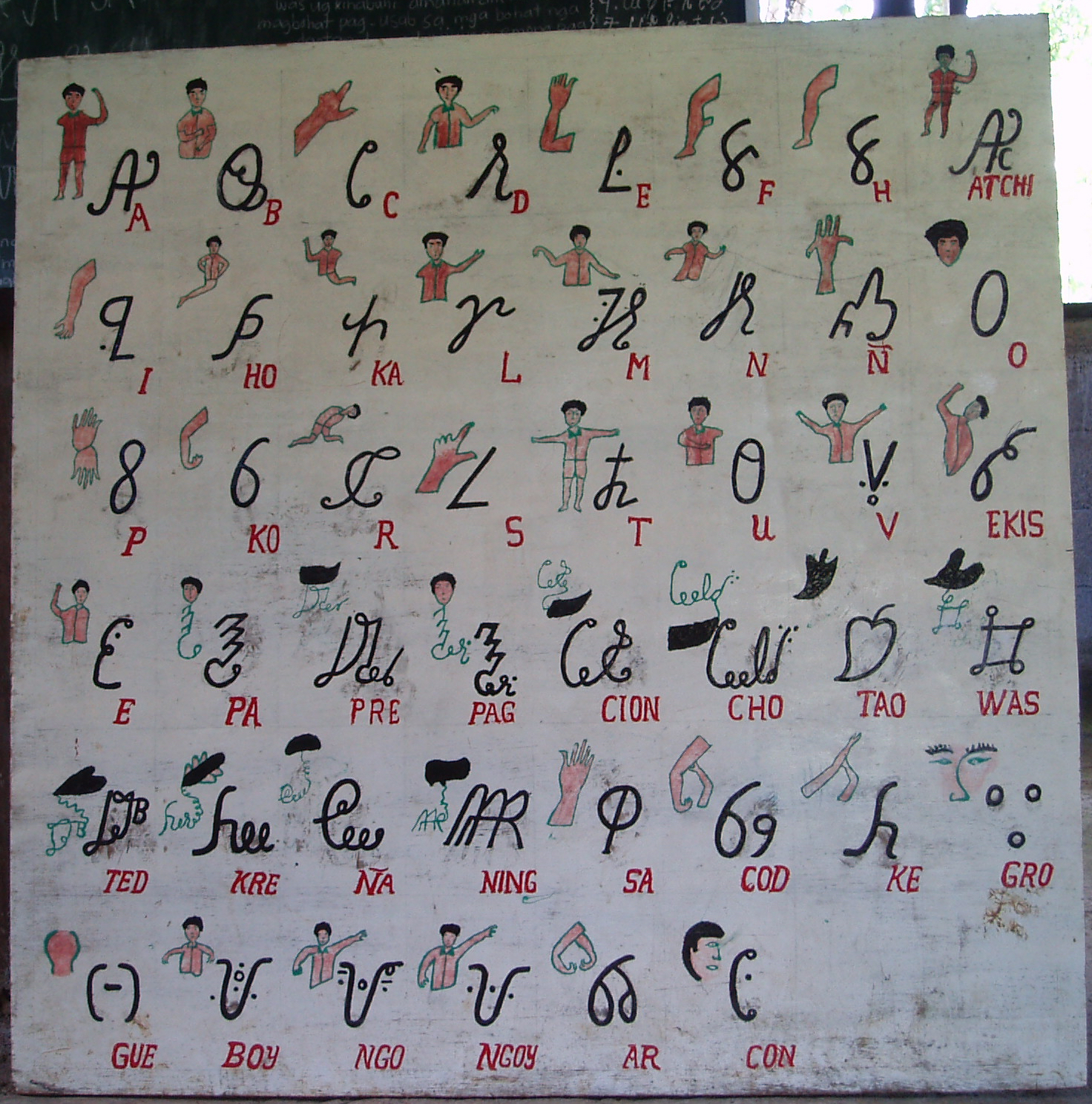
- Created by: Mariano Datahan; Attributed to Pinay, ancestor of the Eskaya people
- Date: ca. 1920–1940
- Setting and usage: Song, prayer, teaching, reproduction of traditional literature. Intended to establish a distinct indigenous culture on the island of Bohol in the Philippines.
- Ethnicity: 3,000 (2013)
- Users: 550 (2013)
- Purpose: Cultural auxiliary language
- Writing system: Eskayan script (syllabary)
- Sources: Encryption of Cebuano, with lexical influence from Spanish and English

Language codes
- ISO 639-3: esy
- Glottolog: eska1234
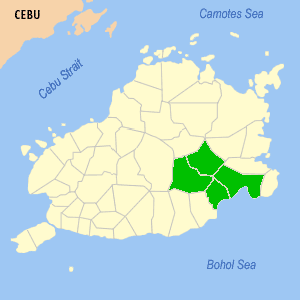

Eskayan is an artificial auxiliary language of the Eskaya people of Bohol, an island province of the Philippines. Its grammar is structurally similar to Visayan-Boholano, the native language of Bohol, with a lexicon that shows little relationship to any Philippine languages. While Eskayan has no mother-tongue speakers, it is taught by volunteers in at least three cultural schools in the southeast interior of the province.

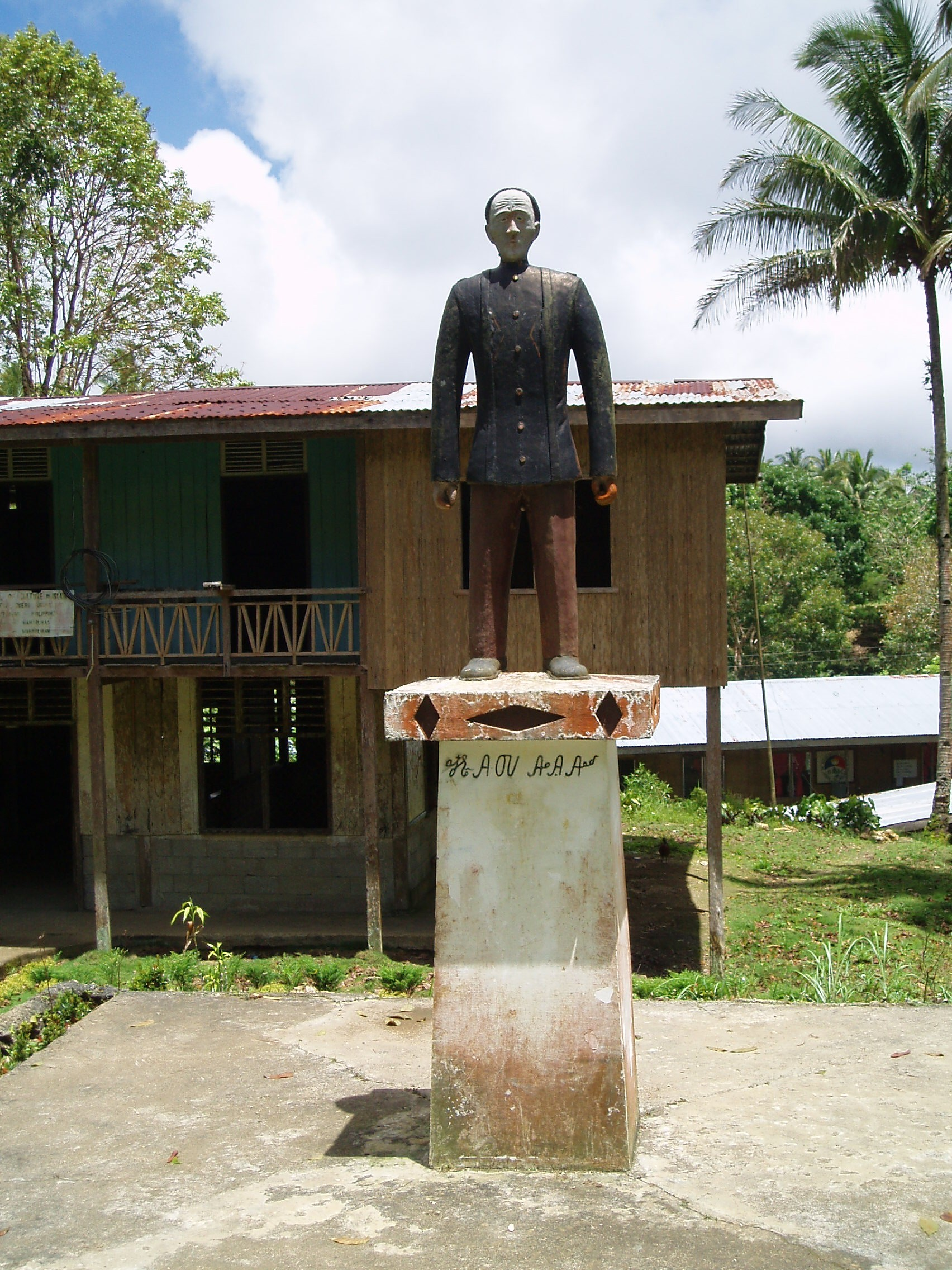
Statue of Mariano Datahan, inscribed with Eskayan script

Eskayan has a number of idiosyncrasies that have attracted wide interest. One of its most immediately remarkable features is its unique writing system of over 1,000 syllabic characters, said to be modeled on parts of the human body, and its non-Philippine lexicon.

The earliest attested document in Eskayan provisionally dates from 1908, and was on display at the Bohol Museum until September 2006.

== History ==
According to speakers, the Eskaya language and script were creations of Pinay, the ancestor of the Eskaya people, who was inspired by human anatomy. The Eskayan language was "rediscovered" in the early 20th century by Mariano Datahan (born Mariano Sumatra, ca. 1875–1949), a Messianic rebel soldier who transmitted it to his followers. Datahan had founded a utopian community in southeast Bohol in the aftermath of the Philippine–American War, in order to resist imperial claims and establish an indigenous nation in Bohol, and the Eskayan language and script were seen as the embodiment of this incipient national culture.

The Last Language on Earth, written by Piers Kelly in 2022, applies a systematic analysis of the Eskayan language and script to trace the history of its speakers, their folklore and religion. Kelly argues that lexical, grammatical and graphical peculiarities all lend support the traditional Eskaya belief that the language and script were created by a charismatic ancestor.

This research further suggests that the Eskayan language emerged in the period after Spanish contact but prior to the full introduction of English after the Philippine–American War. Partial evidence of this includes the presence of "native" terms (i.e., not borrowed or calqued) for post-contact cultural categories such as pope and aeroplane. Further, the language makes semantic distinctions that are made in Spanish and English but not in Visayan (such as between moon and month). Other evidence for this can be found in Eskayan syllable structures that align with Spanish and English. It is circumstantially plausible that some Eskayan vocabulary was created by taking parallel Spanish-English-Visayan wordlists from textbooks, and replacing the Visayan layer with new vocabulary. Finally, the Eskayan script is influenced by the Roman alphabet and bears strong similarities to 19th-century Copperplate handwriting.

Indigenous constructed languages with accompanying creation myths are attested elsewhere in the world. One notable case is the Damin ceremonial language of the Gulf of Carpentaria which is said to have been the creation of the ancestor Kalthad; another are the Pandanus languages of the Medan region of Papua New Guinea.

== Classification ==
Eskayan is a "sophisticated encryption" of the Cebuano language. It shows no lexical similarity to any of the indigenous languages of the Philippines, apart from a very few Cebuano words. Grammatically, however, it is Cebuano. Most of the words were invented, though with inspiration from Spanish and English vocabulary and phonotactics. Some Spanish words had their meanings changed, such as astro 'sun' (from 'star') and tre 'two' (from 'three').

Linguist Ernesto Constantino (Professor of the Linguistics Department of the University of the Philippines) argued that the Visayan-Eskaya ethnolanguage is only a constructed language, whose phonology, grammar, and/or vocabulary have been consciously devised by an individual or group, instead of having evolved naturally. This ethnolanguage would then be comparable to Esperanto and Ido in origin, though not in purpose.

== Writing system ==
The Eskayan script has both alphabetic and syllabic components. A basic 'alphabet' of 46 characters accounts for most of the common sounds and syllables used in Eskayan while a broader subset totalling over 1000 is used to represent the remaining syllables. The unusual diversity of consonant and vowel clusters accounts for this relatively large number of composite characters, which even includes superfluous symbols. The symbols are said to be based on parts of the human anatomy, though many are clearly based on the cursive Roman alphabet.

== Romanised orthography ==
A romanised form of Eskayan is used in the cultural schools for the purpose of exposition. Although not strictly standardised, this orthography has elements in common with the Spanish system once used for transliterating Cebuano. E.g., the letters ⟨i⟩ and ⟨e⟩ are interchangeable symbols representing the sound /ɪ/; the 'll' combination is pronounced /lj/ and the letter ⟨c⟩ will be pronounced /s/ when it precedes a front vowel, as in Spanish. A notable innovation in Eskayan romanised orthography is the letter combination 'chd' which represents the sound /d͡ʒ/.

== Phonology and phonotactics ==
Eskayan shares all the same phonemes as Visayan-Boholano (the particular variety of Cebuano spoken on Bohol) and even includes the distinctive Boholano voiced palatal affricate /d͡ʒ/ that appears in Visayan words such as maayo [maʔad͡ʒo] ('good'). With the exception of this phoneme, Eskayan shares the same basic phonology as Visayan-Cebuano, Tagalog and many other Philippine languages.

The phonotactics of Eskayan, on the other hand, are quite different from those of Visayan-Boholano and Philippine languages generally. This can be seen in Eskayan words such as bosdipir [bosdɪpɪr] ('eel'), guinposlan [ɡɪnposlan] ('face'), ilcdo [ɪlkdo] ('knee') and estrapirado [ɪstrapɪrado] ('flower') that contain consonant sequences like /sd/, /np/, /sl/, /lkd/ and /str/ which do not feature in Philippine languages. Furthermore, a significant number of Eskayan words have phonemic sequences that are common in Spanish or in Spanish loans into Visayan-Boholano but appear rarely, if ever, in non-borrowed words.

== Case system ==
Eskayan conforms to the same syntactic and morphological structure as Cebuano. Accordingly, Eskayan nouns are uninflected but may be marked for case with one of several preceding case markers.

The table below shows the basic case system of Eskayan, with Cebuano equivalents in brackets.

Personal name marker		Non-personal name marker	
nominative	ye or e (si)	Specific (article)	esto (ang)
possessive	kon (ni)	Oblique specific	ya (sa)
dative	puy (kang)	Oblique non-specific	chda (ug)

Kon and esto parallel Spanish con 'with' and esto 'that', approximate Spanish glosses for Cebuano ni and ang.

Eskayan and Cebuano texts, which are always written face-to-face in the bilingual Eskayan books, generally have a one-to-one correspondence. For example:

Eskayan: Yi Omanad aripirna huntun kun Jomabad.
Cebuano: Si Omanad sundalu ubus ni Jomabad.
{} SPEC (name) soldier under GEN (name)
Omanad was a soldier under the command of Jomabad.

== Pronouns ==
Eskayan personal pronouns are also marked by case. In the table below, the Cebuano equivalents are indicated in brackets. (These pronouns are drawn from a limited corpus; omissions are indicated by [] and uncertainties with an asterisk.)

	Absolutive	Genitive₁ (Preposed)	Genitive₂ (Postposed)	Oblique
1st person singular	naren (ako, ko)	damo (akong)	tompoy (nako, ko)	tompoy (kanako, nako)
2nd person singular	samo (ikaw, ka)	gona (imong)	nistro (nimo, mo)	nistro (kanimo, nimo)
3rd person singular	atcil (siya)	chdel (iyang)	kon chdil (niya)	mininos* (kaniya, niya)
1st person plural inclusive	arhitika (kita, ta)	chdaro (atong)	[] (nato)	[] (kanato, nato)
1st person plural exclusive	kim (kami, mi)	gramyu (among)	[] (namo)	[] (kanamo, namo)
2nd person plural	chdicto (kamo, mo)	[] (inyong)	[] (ninyo)	[] (kaninyo, ninyo)
3rd person plural	[] (sila)	persiyan (ilang)	[] (nila)	[] (kanila, nila)

== Lexicon ==
=== Cebuano influences ===
Despite its structural equivalence to Eskayan, Cebuano has had a very limited lexical influence on the language. In a comparison of core Swadesh vocabulary, there are eight identifiable cognates.

English	Eskayan	Cebuano
at	ya	sa
that	cano	ka'na
we (inclusive/exclusive)	arhitika/kim	kita/kami
who	kinya	kinsa
four	pat	upat
six	nom	un'um
eight	wal	walo'
nine	sem	siam

Eskayan words have a one-to-one correspondence with Cebuano, so that when two words are homophones in Cebuano, they are homophones in Eskayan as well. However, the verbal morphology is quite different: Cebuano has twenty-four verbal affixes which indicate grammatical aspect and other feature, whereas Eskayan has just five (muy-, dil-, pur-, yu-, yi-), each of which can substitute for any of the Cebuano affixes. This often makes Eskayan grammar ambiguous, and dependent on the parallel Cebuano text. In addition, some Eskayan verbs are equivalent to specific inflections of Cebuano verbs despite not having any morphology. For example, Eskayan imprus 'was taken on', which is basic root, translates Cebuano gipuslan, where gi- indicates that the action is completed and performed on the grammatical agent. This is likely because the prototype for many Eskayan words was an early English–Spanish–Visayan trilingual, with the Visayan (Cebuano) glosses crossed out and replaced with Eskayan.

=== Spanish influences ===
Although the Eskayan lexicon bears a marked Spanish influence, the loan-patterns are hard to map. Some Spanish words appear to have been directly borrowed into Eskayan with virtually no semantic or phonetic alterations. E.g., the Eskayan word merido, meaning 'husband', is evidently borrowed from the Spanish marido, also meaning 'husband'. Others retain only a few of the semantic properties of the original. E.g., the word astro means 'sun' in Eskayan but 'star; celebrity' in Spanish. In some interesting cases, Eskayan lexical items appear to be borrowed but are assigned new meanings entirely. E.g., the Eskayan memorya ('sky') does not coincide semantically with the Spanish memoria ('memory'). One of the most intriguing examples of such an 'interrupted loan' is that of the Eskayan tre ('two') seemingly derived from the Spanish tres ('three'). Here the semantic property of 'number' was retained but the actual quantity it represented was reassigned.

== Text ==
Eskaya

Samnat yo bantelar,
Datong con Bathala,
Ya abeya cloper meboy secwes
Nemte ya chdid loning
Ya moy beresa gui
Samnat eclabolto
Gona yonoy dokerkedo
Bentod ya hondog yel moy sebar
Chda a chdiam yel keman pay

Edlac esto mesesabla
Lo-ya bac Lobor,
Chdire esto ebetangke chda loreker
Parong esto topete
Ya droser, ya secwes
Do-o moy sam
Tewergoyo asado chda carna
Ya lacyo booy.

Boholano

Yuta kong minahal,
Hatag ni Bathala;
Sa adlaw'g gabi-i,
Taknang tanan
Dinasig sa kinaiyahan
Sa mga bayaning yutawhan
Imong kalinaw gi-ampingan
Lungsod sa bungtod nga matunhay
Ug matam-is nga kinampay

Puti ang kabaybayunan
Walog sa suba binisbisan
Bahandi sa dagat ug kapatagan
Gugma ang tuburan
Sa kagawasan sa tanan
Panalanginan ka
Ihalad ko lawas ug kalag
Sa mutya kong Bohol.

English

This is the land I love,
The land God gave to me,
Caressed by the sun,
Bathed by the sea,
And kissed by the cool breeze
Night and day.
Here's where the early heroes lived,
Here's where they wrought peace and here they bled,
Here rise the marvelous cone-shaped hills,
Here's sweet kinampay grows.

Blessed with white sandy beaches,
Rivers that water valleys,
Seas teem with fishes and cows graze on the plains,
In ev'ry home love reigns,
God keep my homeland always free,
Let her forever be,
I pledge my strength, my heart and soul,
To my dear home, Bohol.

== Theories and controversies ==
In the 1980s and 1990s, the Eskaya community attracted the interest of local mystics who promoted the notion that their language was of exotic origin. Today, the few linguists who have examined Eskayan generally concur that it is structurally Cebuano but lexically innovative, suggesting that Eskayan is an auxiliary language or a highly sophisticated form of disguised speech encoded from Cebuano.
