= Universidad José Cecilio del Valle =

Educational institution in Tegucigalpa, Honduras

Coordinates: 14.0815°N 87.2005°W

UJCV

The Universidad José Cecilio del Valle (UJCV) is a private higher education institution in Honduras. It was established in 1978 through the Asociación Hondureña para el Fomento de la Educación Superior (AHFES). UJCV offers associate's degrees, as well as 4-to-5-year bachelor's degrees along with some master's programs.

== Campus ==
UJCV has two campuses - Tegucigalpa Campus and Comayagua Campus. Comayagua is located in a more suburban environment, in contrast to Tegucigalpa in a more urban environment.

== History ==
The history of the José Cecilio del Valle University (UJCV) began in 1976, when the Honduran Association for the Promotion of Higher Education (AHFES), sought to establish a new center for higher studies, a private university based in Tegucigalpa. On July 9, 1977, the UNAH authorities agreed to the request presented to found the UJCV, in accordance with Constitutional Article 157. On July 20, 1977, the Council of Ministers agreed with the UNAH criteria. On December 1, the José Cecilio del Valle University began its operations. The new university offers Honduran youth an educational offer of three careers: Architecture, Agronomy and Administration of Agricultural Companies. On May 8, 1978, authorization was given for the establishment of the José Cecilio del Valle University, granted by the Government of Honduras by Decree 1605-EP of the Ministry of Public Education.

In 1981, the University signed an international agreement with Tecnológico de Monterrey. Later in 1981, the first class graduated from the University - this represented the first time that any Honduran citizens were able to graduate from a domestic university with an Architecture degrees. In 1982, the University began to offer a Computer Systems Engineering class - also the first in Honduras. In 1986, students that had joined the Computer Systems Engineering program were able to graduate for the first time.

In 1988, the UJCV joined the Inter-American University Organization. In 1990, the UJCV led the newly-created Association of Private Universities of Central America and Panama(Asociación de Universidades Privadas de Centroamérica y Panamá), or AUPRICA. In 1997, they gained accreditation from the AUPRICA.

In 1998, the Comayagua Campus was founded.

In 2008, the first virtual learning platform in Central America was created at the UJCV. In 2011, the Tegucigalpa campus had its newest building constructed. In 2013, the university created its first master's program in Senior Project Management. In 2014, the university created its second master's program in Urban Design and Planning. In 2016, the university opened its third master's program in Labor Law and Social Protection. In 2019, the Senior Project Management master's program was split into four separate programs - Business, Marketing, Finance, and Human Talent. In that same year, the university opened up their latest master's program as of 2024 - "Development Management with a Psychosocial approach".
