= Cecilio Pérez Bordón =

Paraguayan politician

Cecilio Perez Bordon served as the Paraguayan Minister of Public Works under President Fernando Lugo since August 2010 until 2012. Prior to this, he served as Minister of Defense.

== Awards ==
Order of Military Merit (Officer; Brazil)
