= Aguada Cecilio =

Coordinates: 40°51′S 65°51′W

- Municipality and village
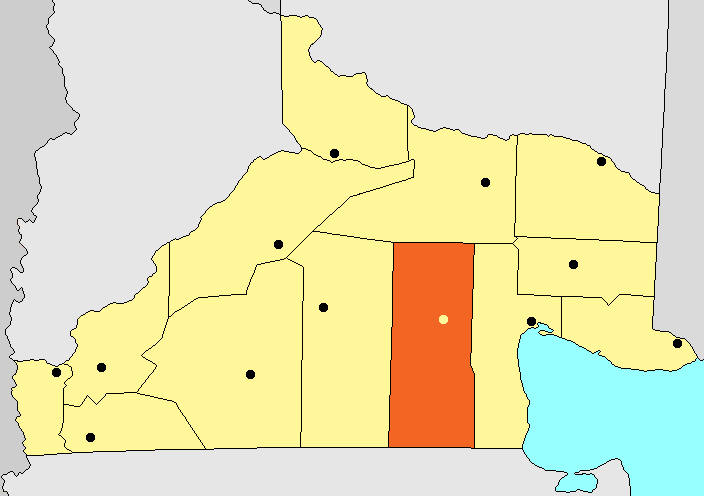
- Country: Argentina
- Province: Río Negro Province
- Department: Valcheta Department
- Elevation: 833 ft (254 m)

Population (2001)
  - Total: 119
- Time zone: UTC−3 (ART)
- Postal code: R8534
- Area code: 02934
- Climate: BSk

Aguada Cecilio is a village and municipality in the Valcheta Department in Río Negro Province, located in the Patagonian region of Argentina.

== Services ==
With a small population of 119 inhabitants (INDEC, 2001), the town is dedicated to raising sheep, goats, cows and horses, politically driven by a development commission. There is general insurance business. It has no gas station.

== Access ==
Aguada Cecilio is to the side of National Route 23 at some 35 km from Valcheta.

== Facilities ==
Aguada Cecilio has, in addition to public buildings, a clinic, a police station and a primary school (still without a permanent residence) attended by children of the area.
