= Dr. Cecilio Putong National High School =

Public high school in Bohol, Philippines

- Bohol High School

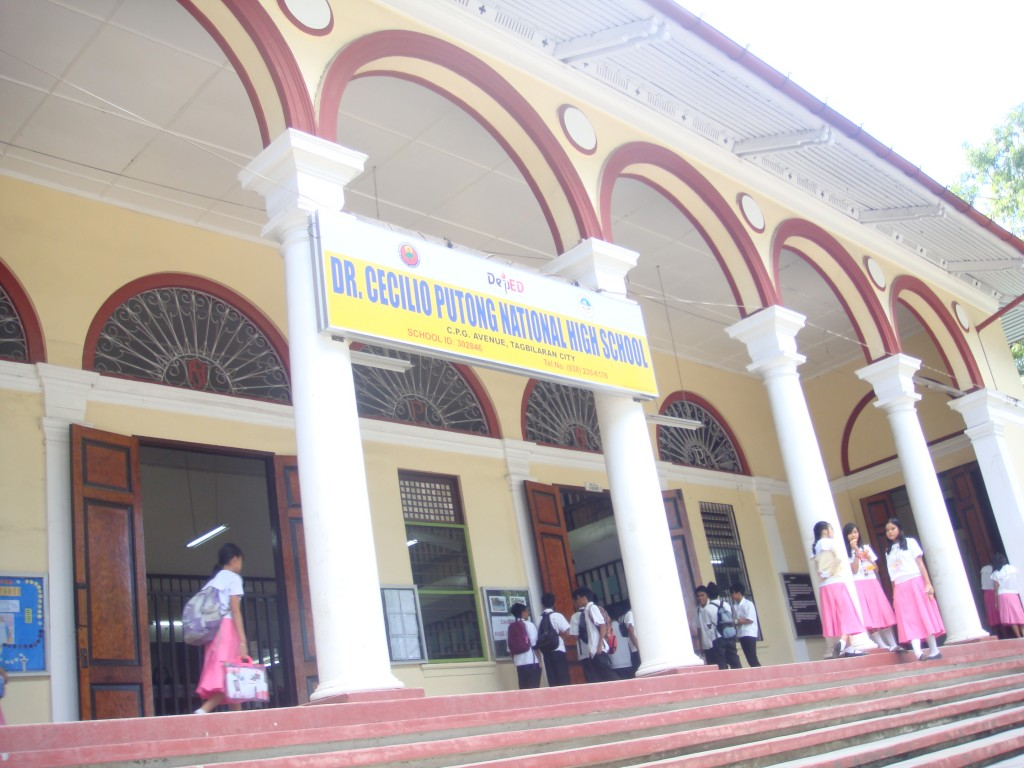
- Dr. Cecilio Putong National High School

Location
- CPG Avenue, Poblacion II; Tagbilaran City, Bohol 6300; Philippines
- 9°38′57.45″N 123°51′20.52″E

Information
- School type: Government Funded, Secondary
- Motto: DISIPLINADO AKO!
- Established: 1905
- School district: 1st District of Bohol
- Principal: MS. MAURINE C. CASTAÑO
- Grades: 7 to 12
- Campus: 21,674 sq. meters
- Colors: Pink and White
- Newspaper: The Boholenian
- Affiliation: DepEd - City of Tagbilaran Division

The Dr. Cecilio Putong National High School, originally the Bohol National High School or BNHS; also Bohol High, is a public, secondary educational institution at Tagbilaran City, Bohol, Philippines. It is located along Carlos P. Garcia or CPG Avenue.

DCPNHS is a landmark of history and tourism of Tagbilaran City and Bohol. Having been a learning institution for 118 years, it is home to affluent leaders nationwide and currently boasts of a student populace of 4,542 and a strong teaching workforce and administrative staff which totals to 320.

== History ==
The school was founded in 1905 by the Thomasites right in the heart and main thoroughfare of the city, the Carlos P. Garcia Avenue. With its Main Gabaldon Building distinct of illustrious white rounded columns and long wide front steps, DCPNHS is a raw replica of heritage and singular Boholano legacy through generations.

In the beginning, it was originally known as Provincial High School and later, Bohol High School. Through Presidential Decree No. 1050, it became Bohol National High School in 1977. It was finally renamed to what it is known today with the Republic Act No. 8016 on May 25, 1995 - as a tribute to a famous alumnus, Dr. Cecilio K. Putong, who became a Secretary of Education in the country.

== Achievements ==
A Department of Education (DepEd) division and regional leader school, this academe is a consistent pilot implementer of educational programs. The school pioneers the Special Program in the Arts (SPA), which was implemented in SY 2000 - 2001. This special arts four year curriculum offers eight courses in varied arts intelligence in Dance, Theatre, Vocal and Instrumental Music, Creative Writing (English), Photography and Media Arts, Visual Arts, and Malikhaing Pagsulat (Filipino). The only one in Central Visayas (Region VII), the DCPNHS - SPA just recently celebrated its 10th Mid - Year Recital, showcasing a repertoire of dances, stage acting, literacy, arts gallery and powerpoint presentations - laudable outputs of its arts majors.

Furthermore, this learning institution is consistently recognized and adjudged Best Implementer of leading DepEd innovative programs like the Alternative Learning System (ALS) for out - of - school adults, Project STRIVE, Brigada Eskwela, among others.
