= Cecilio Putong =

Filipino educator

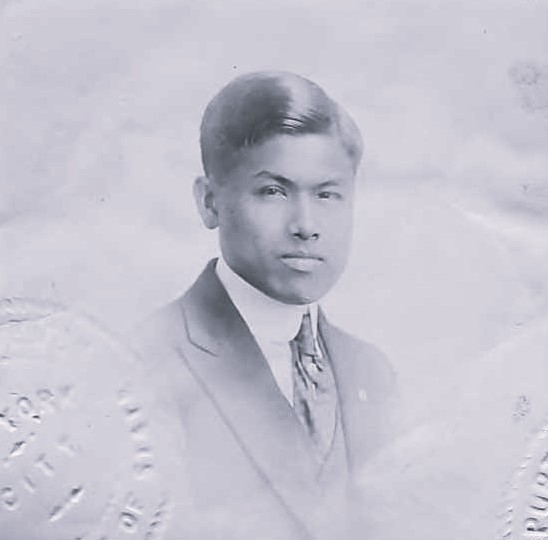
- Putong on his U.S. passport application in 1921

27th Secretary of Education
- In office April 18, 1952 – January 13, 1954
- President: Elpidio Quirino (1952–1953); Ramon Magsaysay (1953–1954)
- Preceded by: Teodoro Evangelista
- Succeeded by: Pastor Endencia

Personal details
- Born: February 1, 1891; Tagbilaran, Bohol, Captaincy General of the Philippines
- Died: January 26, 1980 (aged 88); Quezon City, Philippines
- Spouse: Felicidad Balerong Bautista
- Children: Cecilio Putong Jr. Paul Putong; Orlando Putong; Romeo Putong; Pacita Putong-Sison
- Occupation: Educator and writer
- Nickname: Celio

Cecilio Kapirig Putong (February 1, 1891 – January 26, 1980) was a Filipino scholar, educator, writer, UNESCO fellow, author. In 1952, he became the Secretary of Education of the Philippines. He was one of the most brilliant minds from Bohol having a reported IQ of 138 (Very Superior) based on Otis Intelligence Scale Test.

== Early life ==
His parents were Apolinario Putong and Gregoria Kapirig, both from Tagbilaran, Bohol. His father was an assistant band conductor. His mother was a housewife who, upon the death of her husband at an early age, had to be a vendor to raise two children, Cirilo and Cecilio.

== Education ==
Putong's first formal teacher was Maestro Andoy who happened to be the future Bohol Governor Fernando Gorraiz Rocha. The school was then the old stone building at the corner of J.A. Clarin Street and CPG Avenue, where a PNB branch still stands today.

Later, he studied at the Bohol High School established by the Thomasites, the first American teachers in the Philippines. In March 1906, after passing corresponding examinations, he obtained the primary course in March 1906 and the intermediate course certificate in June 1906.

=== As a scholar ===
- Diploma for Normal Course, Philippine Normal School, Manila, graduated as Class Valedictorian (1908–12)
- Diploma, University of the Philippines, 1914–15, 1917–18
- BSE - Western Illinois State Teachers College, 1920
- M. A. - Columbia University, NYC, 1921
- University of Minnesota, spring of 1928
- Cornell University, summer of 1928
- Ph.D. - University of Chicago, Illinois, 1937

== Career highlights ==
- Primary School Teacher, Tagbilaran, Bohol, 1912-14
- Intermediate School Principal, Dimiao, Bohol, 1912
- Teacher, Bohol High School, 1915–17
- Division Academic Supervisor, Iloilo Province, 1921–22.
- High School Principal, Provinces of Abra and La Union, 1922–24
- Superintendent of Schools in Various provinces, 1924–27, 1929–31
- Chief, Curriculum Department, Bureau of Education, 1931–38
- Superintendent of City Schools, Manila, 1938–45.
- Professional Lecturer on Education, University of the Philippines, 1940–41 and 1946
- Chief, Elementary Education, Department of Instruction, 1945–46
- Assistant Director of Public Schools, 1946–48
- Director of Public Schools, 1948–49
- Undersecretary of Education, 1949–52
- Secretary of Education, 1952-1954

== Writings ==
- Editor, "Visayan Planters", UP College of Agriculture, 1915
- Editor, "Western Courier", Western Illinois State Teachers College, 1919
- Author, "Bohol and Its People" (Manila, 1965)
- Co-Author with Lydia Abad-Santos, "Philippine Community Life for First Year High School" (G. Miranda & Sons, 1963)
- Co-Author with C. de la Pena and I. Fajardo, "Livingin Our Country, Grade 5" and "Living in Our World, Grade 6" (Bookman, Inc., 1964 & 1968)
- Editorials in the "Filipino Teacher" (1956–1961)
- Writer of various articles and speeches on education, boy scout movement, and related topics

== Awards and citations ==
- At the age of 13 when he joined a contest in composition writing. His piece, "The Province of Bohol" won him first prize, receiving five pesos from Judge Charles H. Burritt and two pesos more from Governor Salustiano Borja.
- First Prize, Composition Writing Contest on "The Province of Bohol" held on Nov 28, 1904 (prize of P5 from Judge Charles Buritt and P2 from Bohol Governor Salustiano Borja)
- First Prize, Folklore Writing Contest conducted by the Philippine Education Company in 1910 (prize: any course offered by the Int'l. Correspondence School based in USA)
- Rizal "Pro Patria" Award for Education in Nationalism- given by President Carlos P. Garcia during the first centenary of Dr. Jose Rizal's birthday (June 19, 1961)
- Received the honorary degree of Doctor of Humanities, honoris causa, by the University of Bohol (May 15, 1975)
- Citation as Outstanding Alumnus of the Philippine Normal College (formerly Phil. Normal School) during its Golden Jubilee (Sept.2, 1951)
- Citation for Faithful and Inspired Service to the Philippine Educational System from Classroom Teacher to Undersecretary of Education --- given during its Golden Jubilee on December 16, 1951
- Award for Distinguished Service to the Philippine School System --- given by the Philippine Association of School Superintendents in 1956
- Bronze Usa, Silver Usa and Bronze Tamaraw (various Dates); Silver Tamaraw (1954); Gold Medal of Merit (1958); Special Plaque for Distinguished Service (1960); and Certificate of Recognition (1961) --- all from the Boy Scouts of the Philippines
- Certificate of Appreciation --- from the Jose Rizal National Centennial Commission (1961)
- Citation for Services Rendered as Ex-chairman of the board of Regents --- given by the University of the Philippines (1963)
- Award of Merit for Outstanding Service in the field of Education --- given by the Bohol Association, Inc. in Manila (1959)
- Citation as Educator of the Year --- given by the Lions Club of Tagbilaran

== Membership ==
- Member, Radio Control Board
- Member, Board of Textbooks
- Chairman, Committee on Study and Training in the US
- Member, Board of Directors, United States Educational Foundation in the Philippines
- Member, Commission on Educational, Scientific, and Educational Matters
- Member, National Executive Board, Boy Scouts of the Philippines
- Kappa Delta Pi

== Honors and recognition ==
- Dr. Cecilio Putong National High School - formerly the Bohol National High School (BNHS), a public secondary educational institution in Tagbilaran City named after him through Republic Act No. 8016 sponsored by Congressman Isidro Zarraga Jr enacted on May 25, 1995. It is located along Carlos P. Garcia Avenue.
- Putong Street - formerly Ma. Clara Street, a street in downtown Tagbilaran City.

== Sources ==
- Jose Marianito Luspo, Holy Name University
